= Martinj Vrh, Žiri =

Martinj Vrh
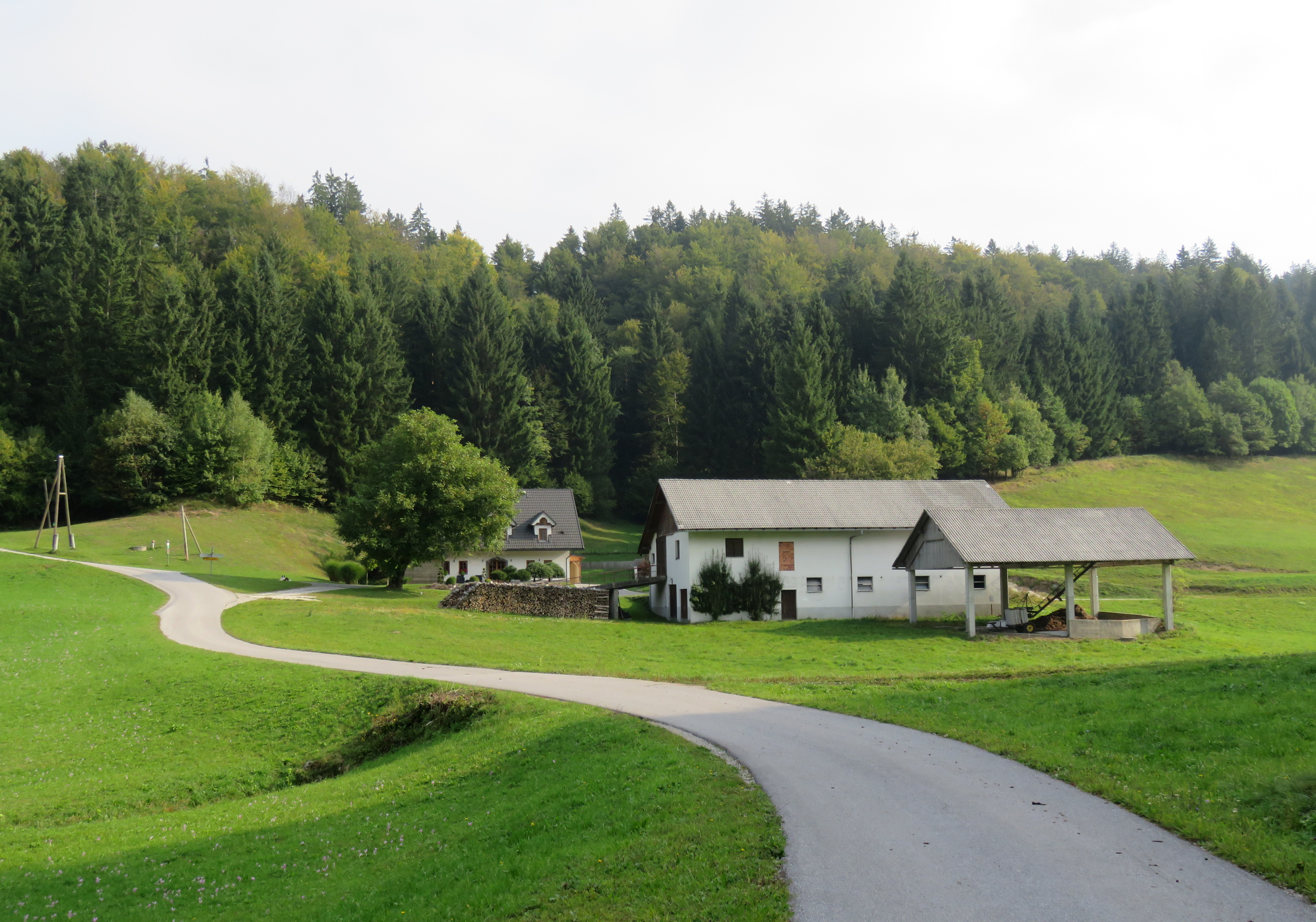

- Location in Slovenia
- Coordinates: 46°01′15″N 14°08′35″E
- Country: Slovenia
- Traditional region: Upper Carniola
- Statistical region: Upper Carniola
- Municipality: Žiri
- Elevation: 689 m (2,260 ft)

Martinj Vrh (pronounced [maɾˈtiːn ˈʋəɾx], in older sources Martinjvrh, Martinji Vrh, or Martinvrh) is a former village in northwestern Slovenia in the Municipality of Žiri. It is now part of the village of Opale. It is part of the traditional region of Upper Carniola and is now included in the Upper Carniola Statistical Region.

== Geography ==
Martinj Vrh stands at a crossroads in the middle of the territory of Opale. The road connections lead to Goropeke to the north, Vrh Svetih Treh Kraljev to the southeast, and Brekovice to the west. Martinj Creek (Slovene: Martinjska grapa) has its source northwest of the settlement and flows through a ravine to the west, where it empties into the Poljane Sora River in Brekovice.

== Name ==
Martinj Vrh was attested in historical sources as Martingenpotoch in 1291 and 1318, and as Martinvrch in 1500.

== History ==
Martinj Vrh was deemed annexed by the village of Opale in 1953, ending any existence it had as an independent settlement.
