= Koprivnik, Žiri =

Koprivnik
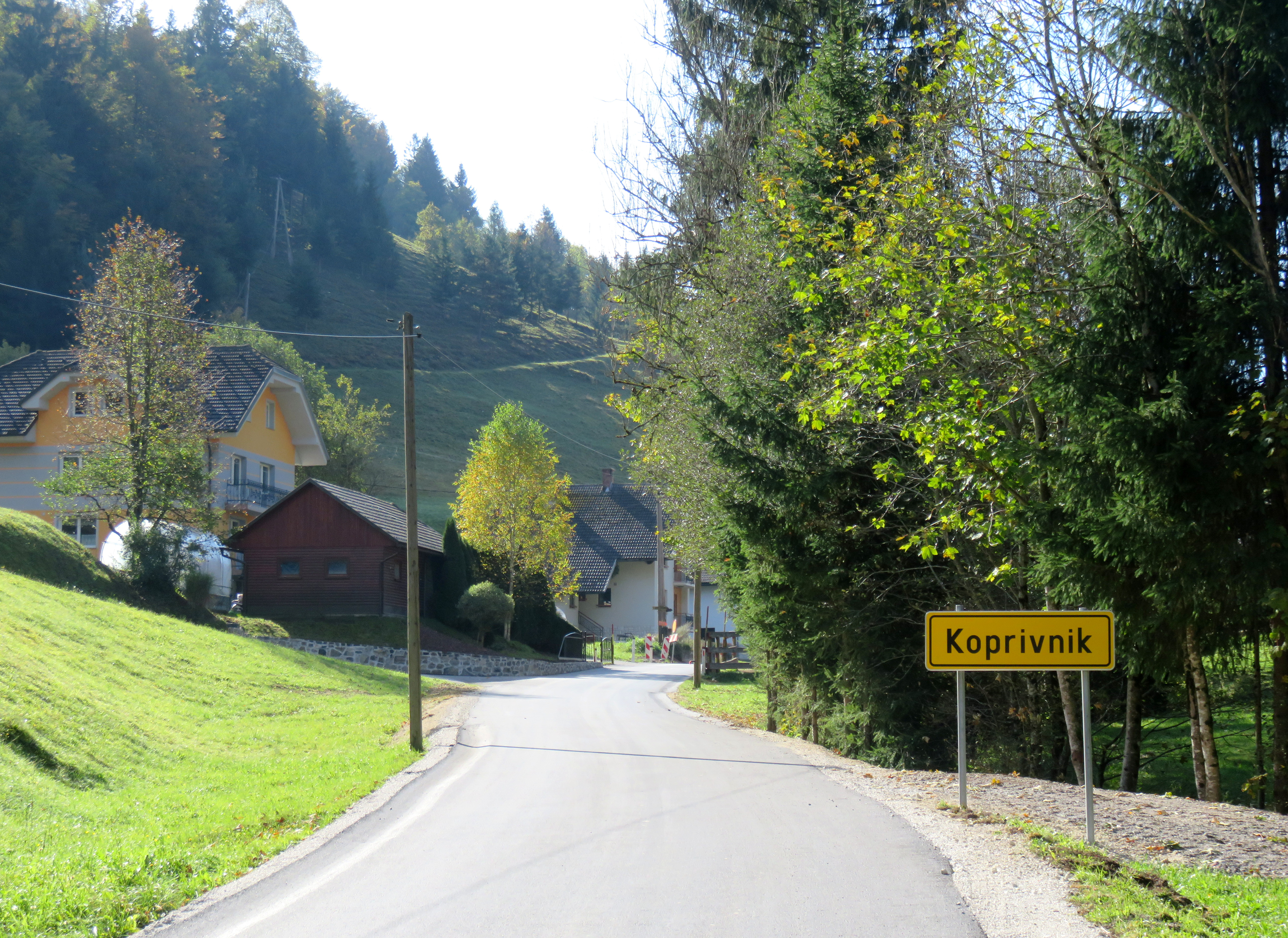

- Location in Slovenia
- Coordinates: 46°4′38.48″N 14°3′37.42″E
- Country: Slovenia
- Traditional region: Upper Carniola
- Statistical region: Upper Carniola
- Municipality: Žiri

Area
  - Total: 5.8 km^{2} (2.2 sq mi)
- Elevation: 662.5 m (2,174 ft)

Population (2012)
  - Total: 103

Koprivnik (Slovene pronunciation: [kɔˈpɾíːwnik]; German: Kopriunik) is a small dispersed settlement northwest of Žiri in the Upper Carniola region of Slovenia. It consists of isolated farms in the hills above the right bank of Sovodenjščica Creek (a.k.a. Hobovščica Creek), extending from the Javorščica Gorge to the hills above Fužine. The territory of the settlement ranges between 515 and 810 m in elevation.
