= Podklanec, Žiri =

Podklanec
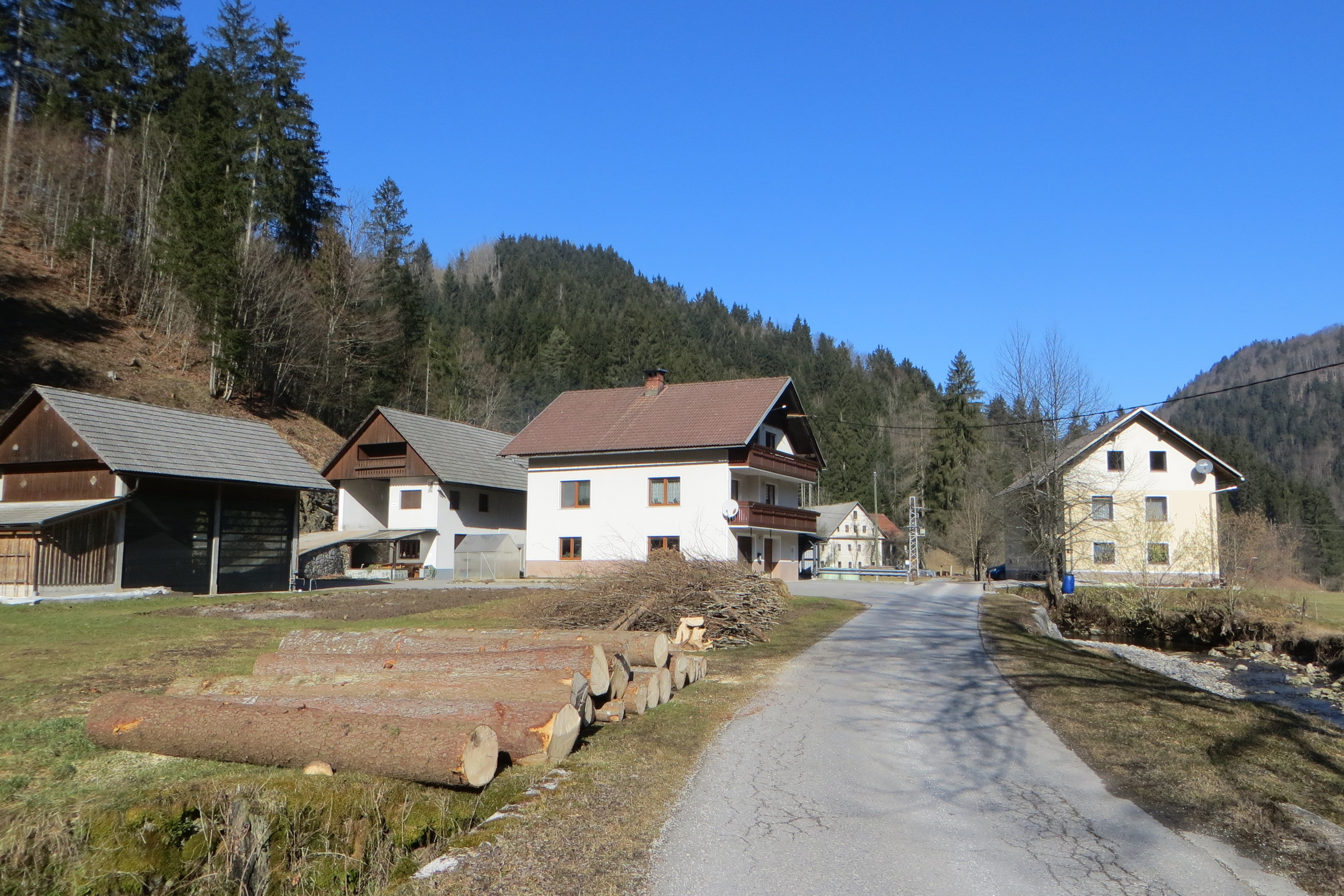

- Location in Slovenia
- Coordinates: 46°0′33.55″N 14°7′42.18″E
- Country: Slovenia
- Traditional region: Upper Carniola
- Statistical region: Upper Carniola
- Municipality: Žiri

Area
  - Total: 0.68 km^{2} (0.26 sq mi)
- Elevation: 498.2 m (1,635 ft)

Population (2002)
  - Total: 14

Podklanec (pronounced [pɔtˈklaːnəts]; German: Podklanz) is a small settlement south of Žiri in the Upper Carniola region of Slovenia. It lies at the end of a valley where Black Creek (Slovene: Črna) and Sovra Creek meet to become the Poljane Sora River (Slovene: Poljanska Sora).
