= Osojnica, Slovenia =

Osojnica
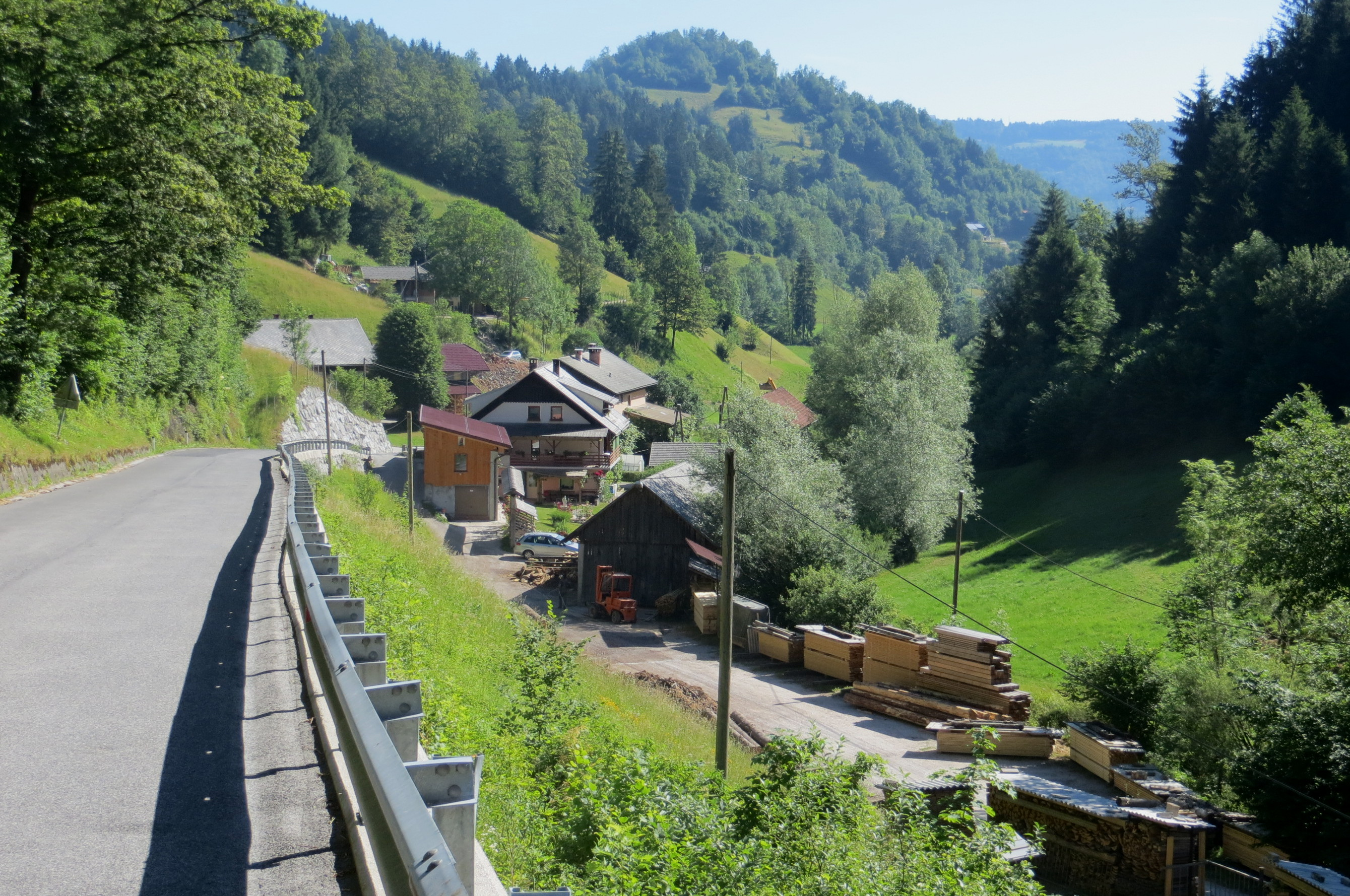

- Location in Slovenia
- Coordinates: 46°2′10.79″N 14°5′20.15″E
- Country: Slovenia
- Traditional region: Upper Carniola
- Statistical region: Upper Carniola
- Municipality: Žiri

Area
  - Total: 0.91 km^{2} (0.35 sq mi)
- Elevation: 512.6 m (1,682 ft)

Population (2002)
  - Total: 26

Osojnica (pronounced [ɔˈsoːi̯nitsa], German: Ossoinitz) is a small settlement on a stream with the same name, a tributary of the Poljane Sora (Slovene: Poljanska Sora), in the hills southwest of Žiri in the Upper Carniola region of Slovenia.

== Name ==
The name Osojnica is derived from the Slovene common noun osoje 'shady side (of a slope)'. Related names in Slovene ethnic territory include Osojnik, Ossiach (in Austria), and Oseacco (in the Resia Valley in Italy).

== History ==
Before the Second World War, Osojnica and the surrounding area were part of the Kingdom of Italy. The Italians built a small barracks in the settlement. After the war, the building was converted for residential use.
