= Račeva =

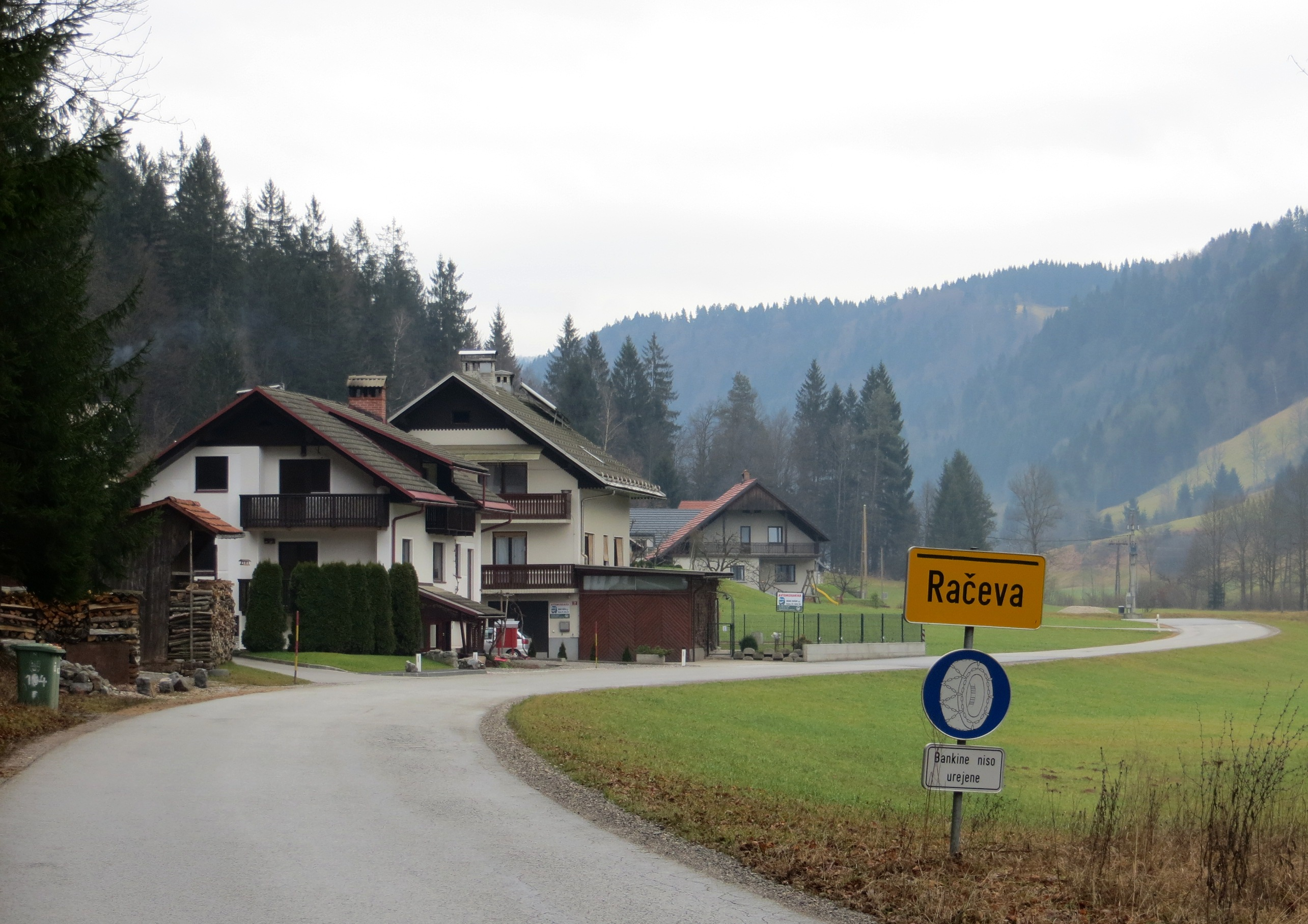

- Location in Slovenia
- Coordinates: 46°2′0.26″N 14°8′29.14″E
- Country: Slovenia
- Traditional region: Upper Carniola
- Statistical region: Upper Carniola
- Municipality: Žiri

Area
  - Total: 3.22 km^{2} (1.24 sq mi)
- Elevation: 528.8 m (1,735 ft)

Population (2002)
  - Total: 159

Račeva (pronounced [ˈɾaːtʃɛʋa]) is a dispersed settlement in a valley of the same name southeast of Žiri in the Upper Carniola region of Slovenia. Račeva Creek runs along the valley and is a tributary of the Poljane Sora River (Slovene: Poljanska Sora).

== History ==
During the Second World War, the border between territory annexed to Nazi Germany and Fascist Italy ran along Račeva Creek. In 1941, the Germans demolished the water-powered Debenc Mill during demarcation of the border.
