= Opale =

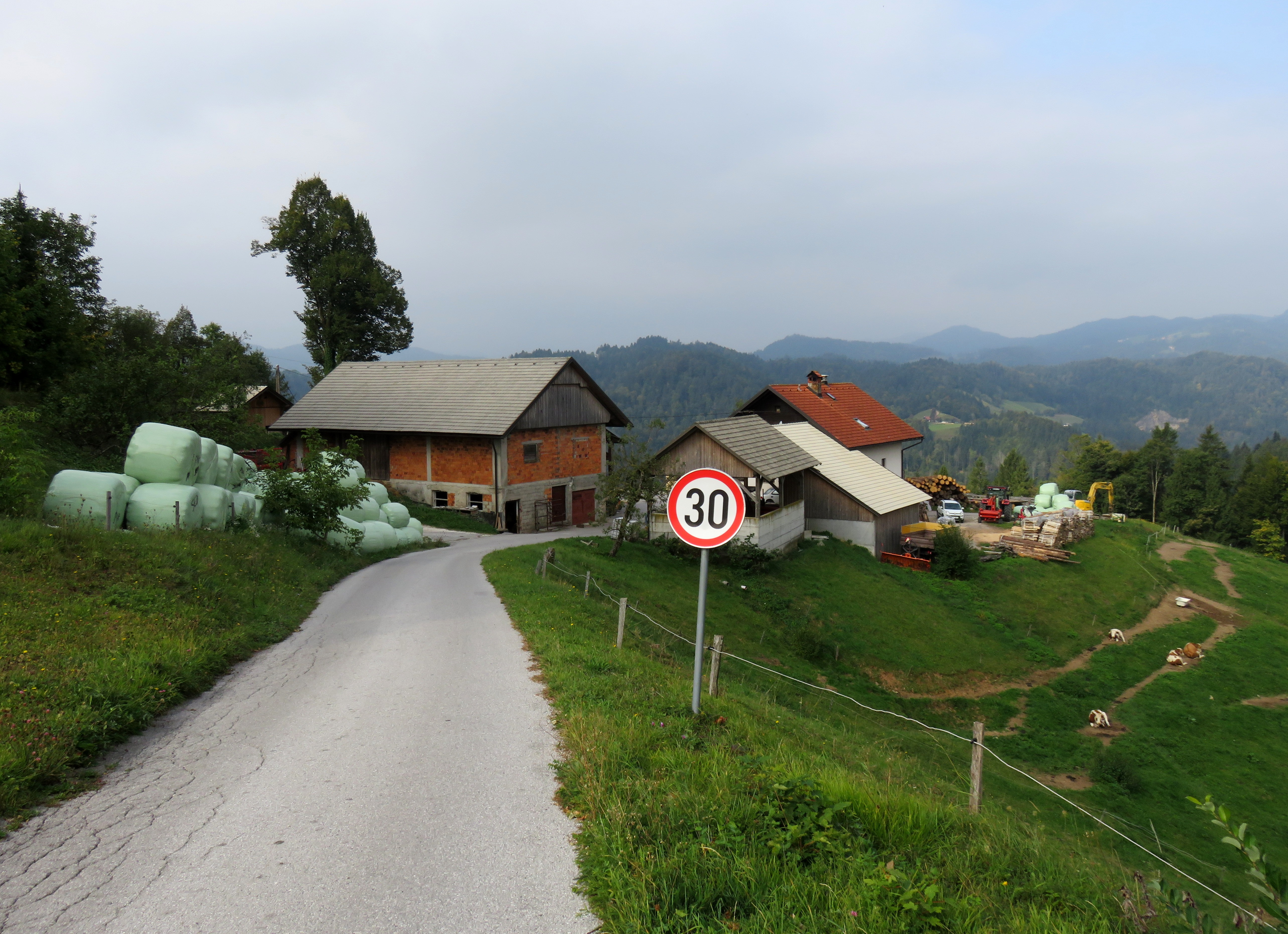
- The hamlet of Laznar in Opale

- Location in Slovenia
- Coordinates: 46°1′10.15″N 14°7′59.23″E
- Country: Slovenia
- Traditional region: Upper Carniola
- Statistical region: Upper Carniola
- Municipality: Žiri

Area
  - Total: 2.87 km^{2} (1.11 sq mi)
- Elevation: 762.1 m (2,500 ft)

Population (2002)
  - Total: 26

Opale (pronounced [ˈoːpalɛ]) is a small settlement in the hills southeast of Žiri in the Upper Carniola region of Slovenia.

== Geography ==
Opale is made up of the hamlet of Martinj Vrh at the crossroads in the center of the village's territory plus the hamlets of Log to the north, and Opale and Laznar to the west, as well as individual farms.

== Name ==
Opale was attested in historical sources as Goreniissgori (i.e., Gorenje Izgorje 'upper Izgorje') in 1500.
