= Jarčja Dolina =

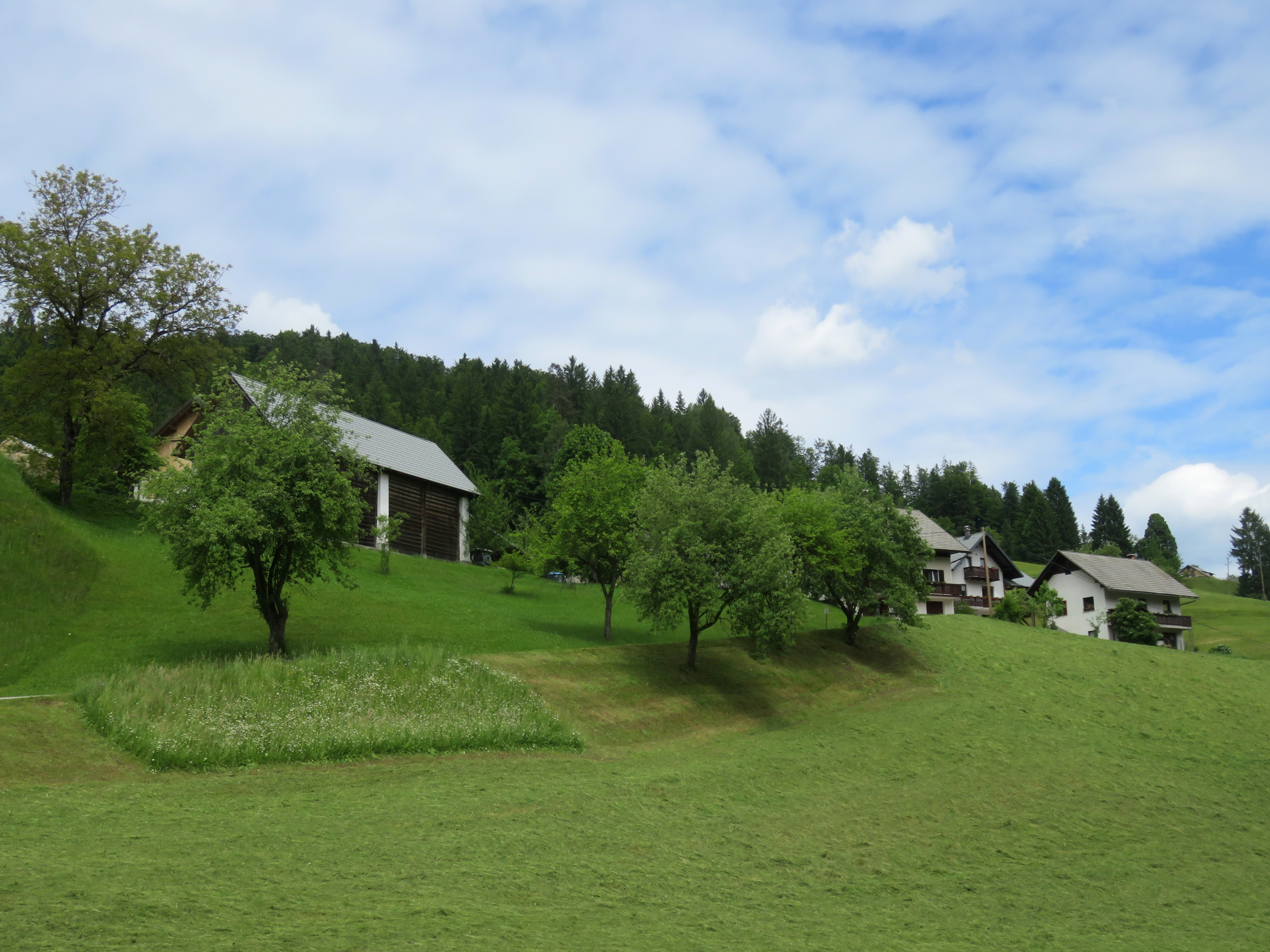

- Location in Slovenia
- Coordinates: 46°3′53.08″N 14°4′31.47″E
- Country: Slovenia
- Traditional region: Upper Carniola
- Statistical region: Upper Carniola
- Municipality: Žiri

Area
  - Total: 2.46 km^{2} (0.95 sq mi)
- Elevation: 687 m (2,254 ft)

Population (2002)
  - Total: 72

Jarčja Dolina (pronounced [ˈjaːɾtʃa dɔˈliːna]) is a dispersed settlement in a small valley west of Selo in the Municipality of Žiri in the Upper Carniola region of Slovenia. Rupe, in the eastern part of the settlement, was formerly an independent settlement known as Rupe pri Selu.

== Name ==
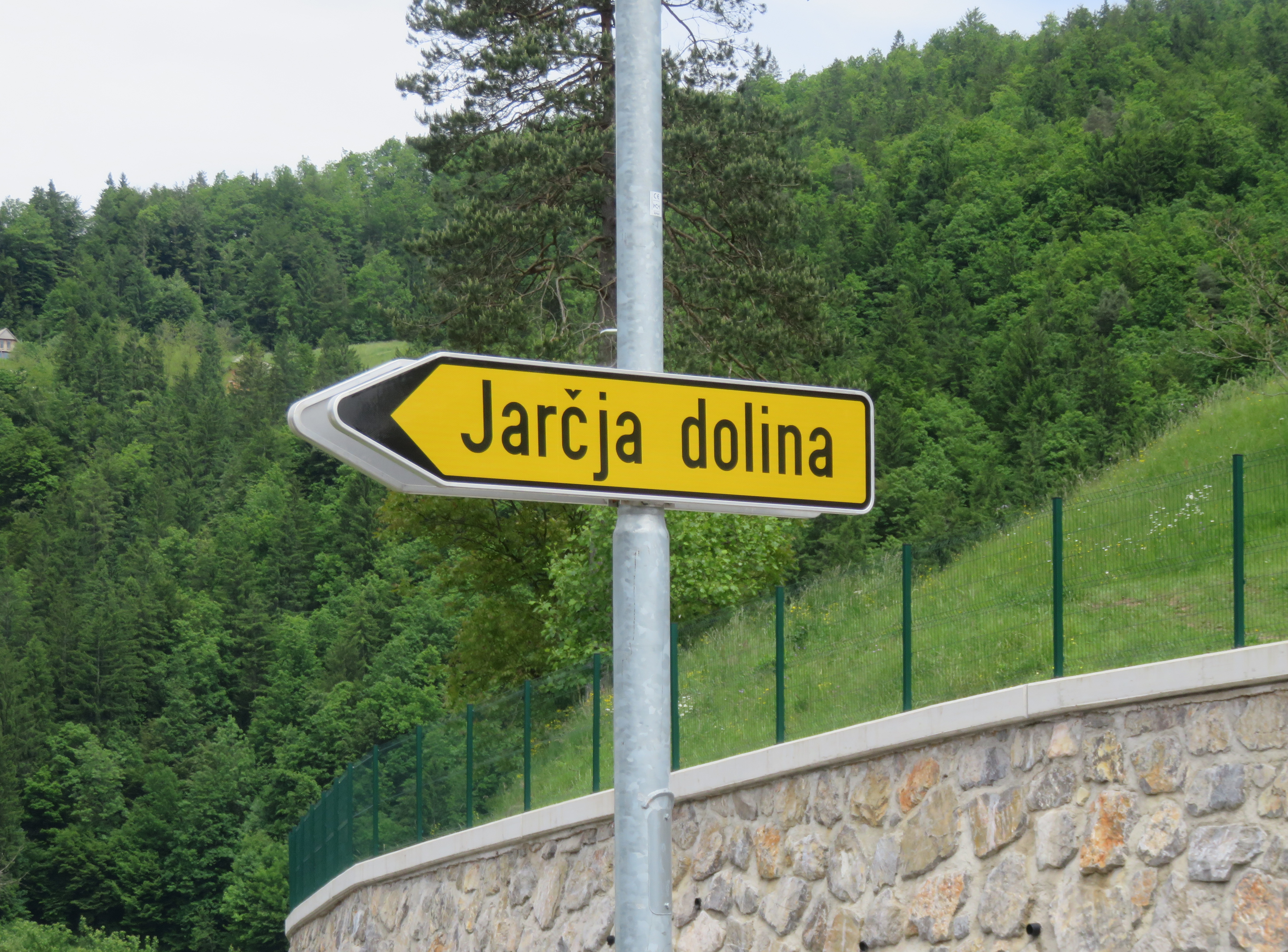
Road sign for Jarčja Dolina

The dialect adjective jarčji means 'sheep', and so the name Jarčja Dolina literally means 'sheep valley'. For similar names, see Jarčje Brdo and Jarčji Vrh.
