= Sovra =

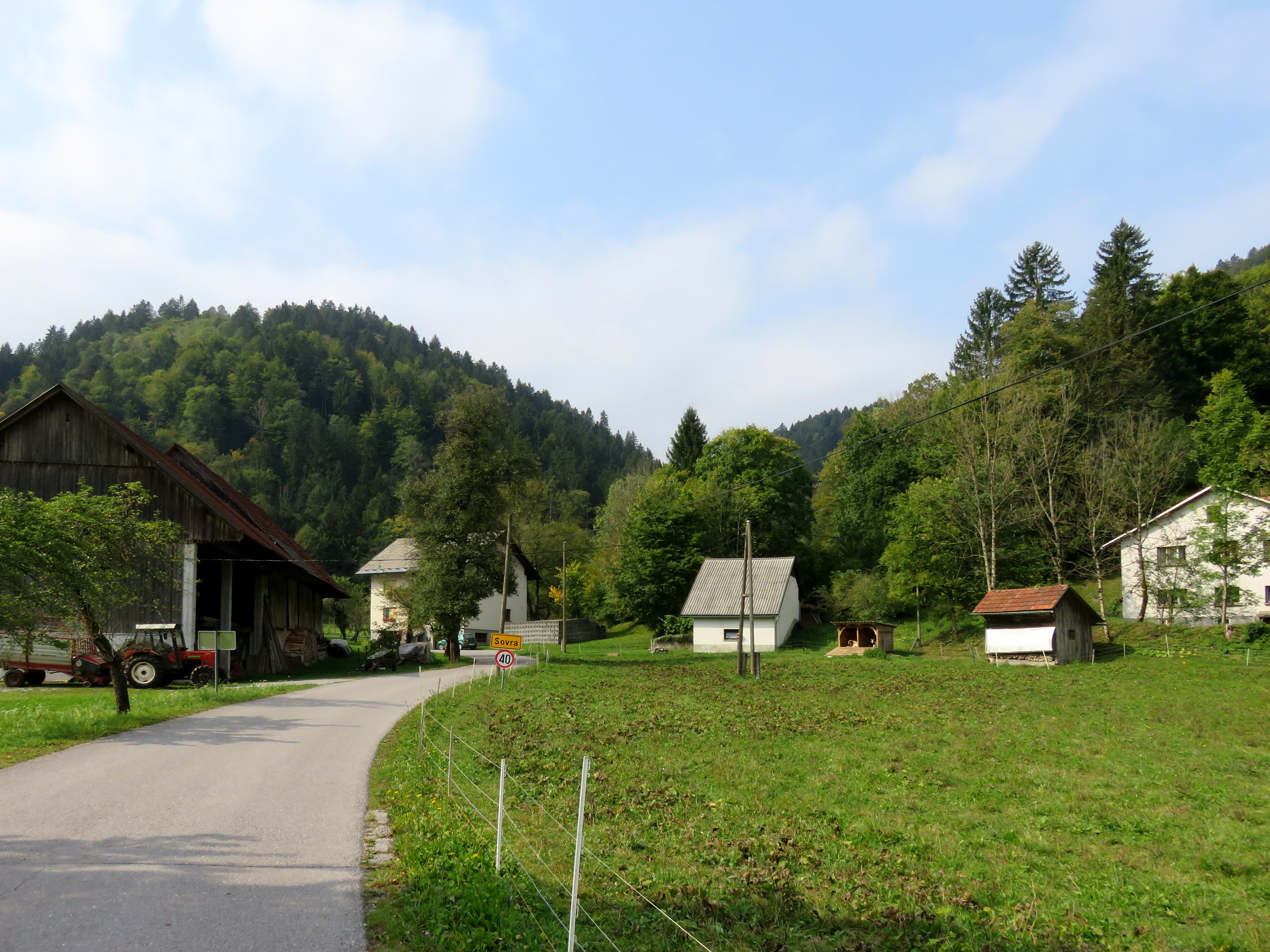

- Location in Slovenia
- Coordinates: 46°1′9″N 14°6′48″E
- Country: Slovenia
- Traditional region: Upper Carniola
- Statistical region: Upper Carniola
- Municipality: Žiri

Area
  - Total: 1.48 km^{2} (0.57 sq mi)
- Elevation: 497.7 m (1,633 ft)

Population (2002)
  - Total: 13

Sovra (pronounced [ˈsoːu̯ɾa]) is a small settlement in the Municipality of Žiri in the Upper Carniola region of Slovenia. It lies in the valley of Žirovnica Creek, a tributary of the Poljane Sora, south of the town of Žiri.

== Name ==
Sovra was attested in written sources as Zaevr in 1318, Sewre in 1453, and Soure in 1500, among other spellings. The name of the village is originally a hydronym, sharing its name with the Sovra River, as the Poljane Sora is known in its upper course. The name is derived from the common noun *ső̜vьra with the original meaning 'flashy stream' or 'confluence'.
