= Breznica pri Žireh =

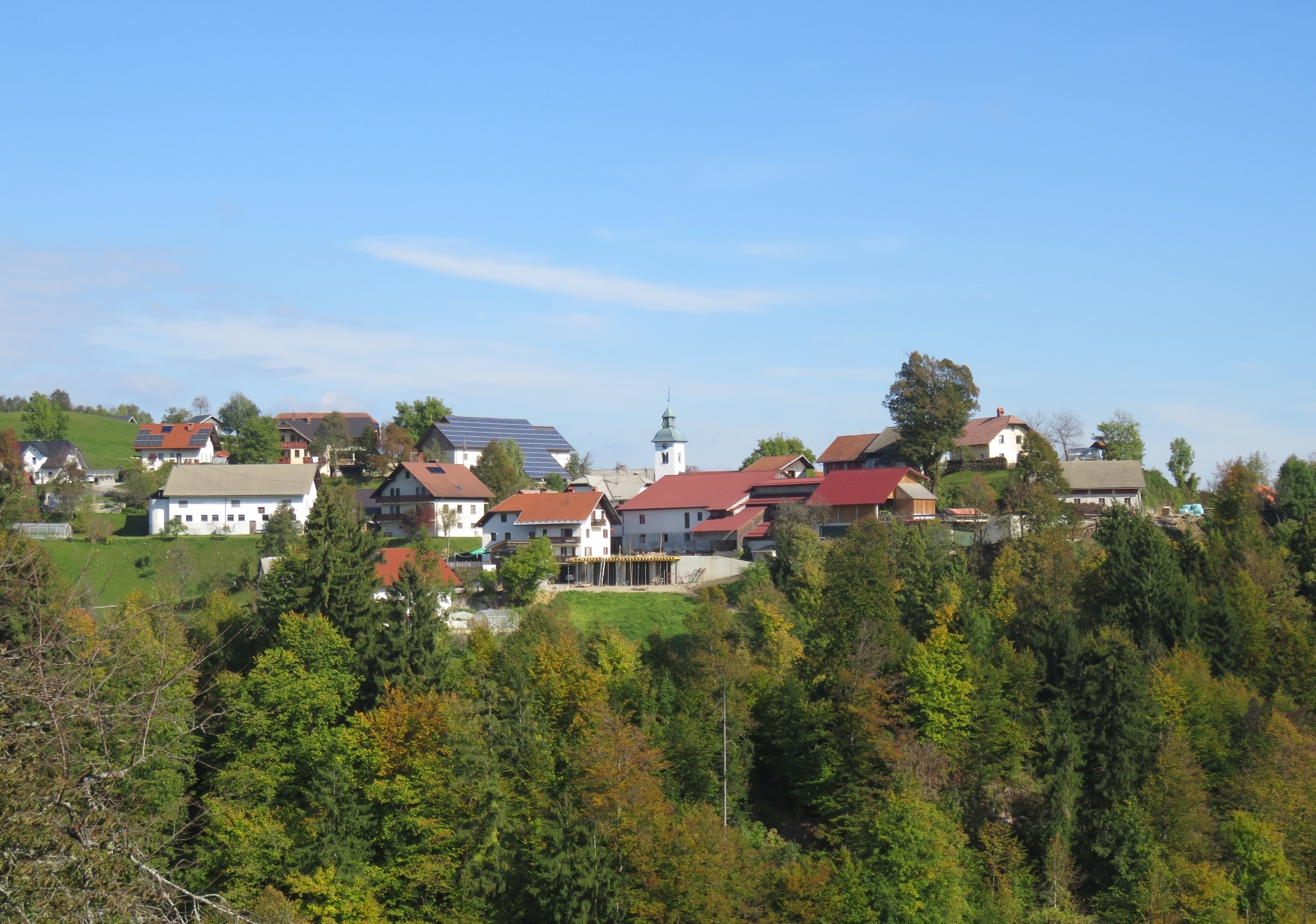

- Location in Slovenia
- Coordinates: 46°2′37.63″N 14°5′15.06″E
- Country: Slovenia
- Traditional region: Upper Carniola
- Statistical region: Upper Carniola
- Municipality: Žiri

Area
  - Total: 0.94 km^{2} (0.36 sq mi)
- Elevation: 755.2 m (2,478 ft)

Population (2002)
  - Total: 42

Breznica pri Žireh (pronounced [ˈbɾeːznitsa pɾi ʒiˈɾeːx], German: Bresnik) is a small settlement in the hills west of Žiri in the Upper Carniola region of Slovenia.

== Name ==
Breznica pri Žireh was attested in written sources as Brieznitz in 1291, Nabresnitzi in 1453, and Wresnitzi in 1500. The name of the settlement was changed from Breznica to Breznica pri Žireh in 1955. The name is derived from the common noun breza 'birch'. Like similar toponyms in Slovenia (e.g., Brezova, Brezovec, Brezovci), it originally referred to the local vegetation.

== Church ==
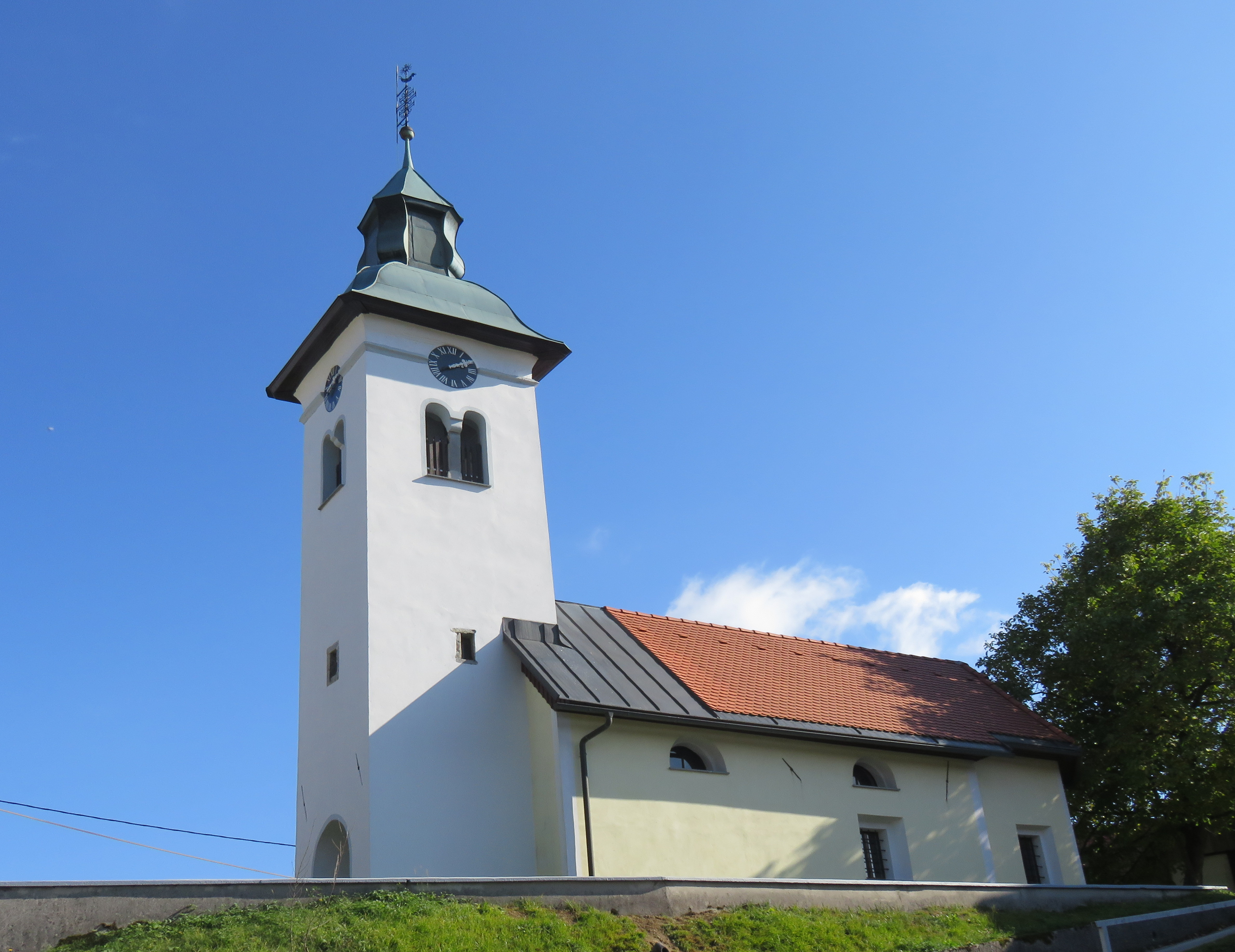
Saint Cantius's Church

The small church in the centre of the settlement is a late 15th- to early 16th-century building. It is dedicated to Saint Cantius and belongs to the Parish of Žiri.
