= Ravne pri Žireh =

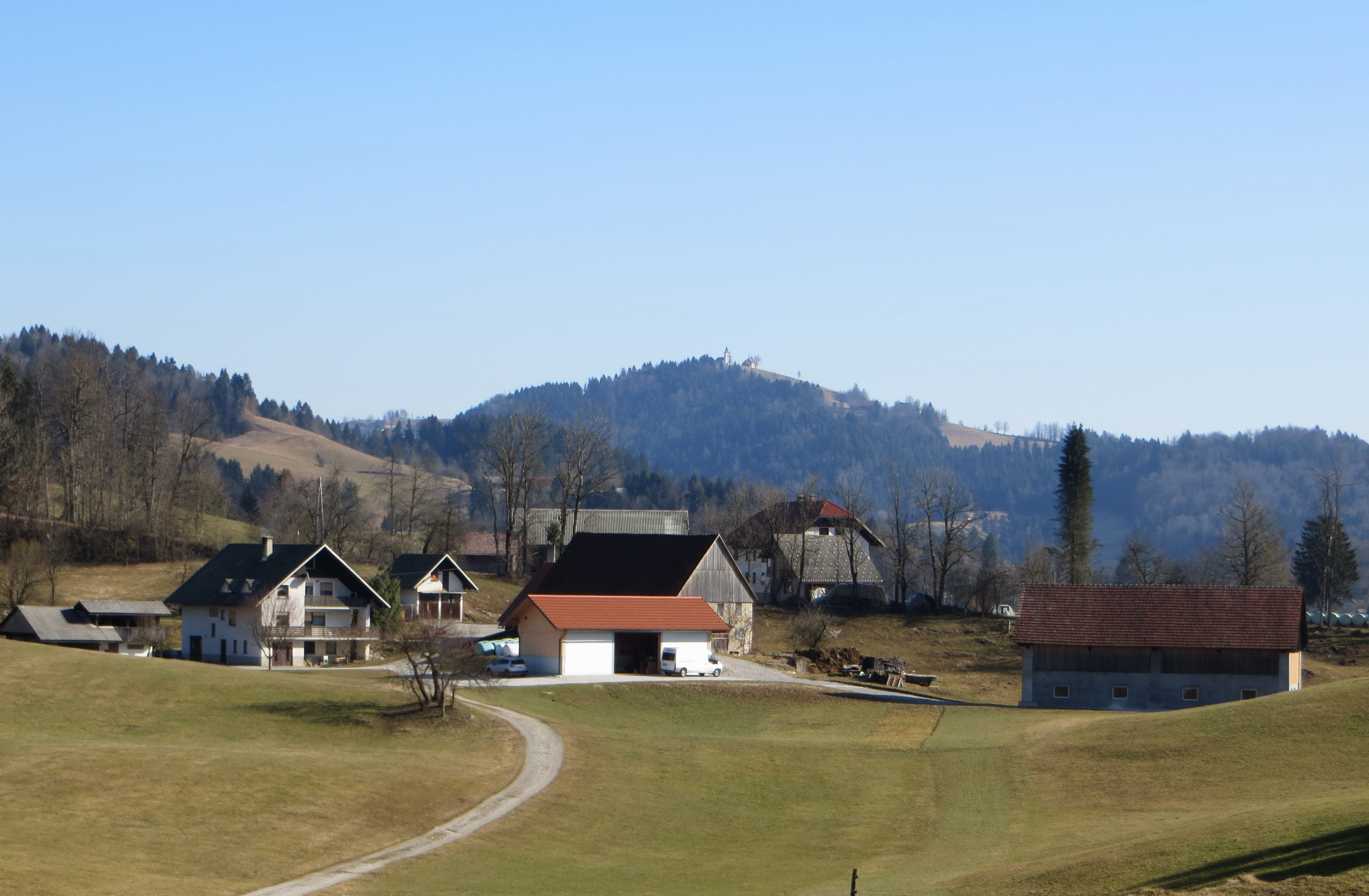

- Location in Slovenia
- Coordinates: 46°0′40.24″N 14°7′2.05″E
- Country: Slovenia
- Traditional region: Upper Carniola
- Statistical region: Upper Carniola
- Municipality: Žiri

Area
  - Total: 0.83 km^{2} (0.32 sq mi)
- Elevation: 628.1 m (2,061 ft)

Population (2020)
  - Total: 20
  - Density: 24/km^{2} (62/sq mi)

Ravne pri Žireh (pronounced [ˈɾáːu̯nɛ pɾi ʒiˈɾeːx]) is a small settlement in the hills south of Žiri in the Upper Carniola region of Slovenia.

== Name ==
The name of the settlement was changed from Ravne to Ravne pri Žireh in 1953.
