= Ledinica =

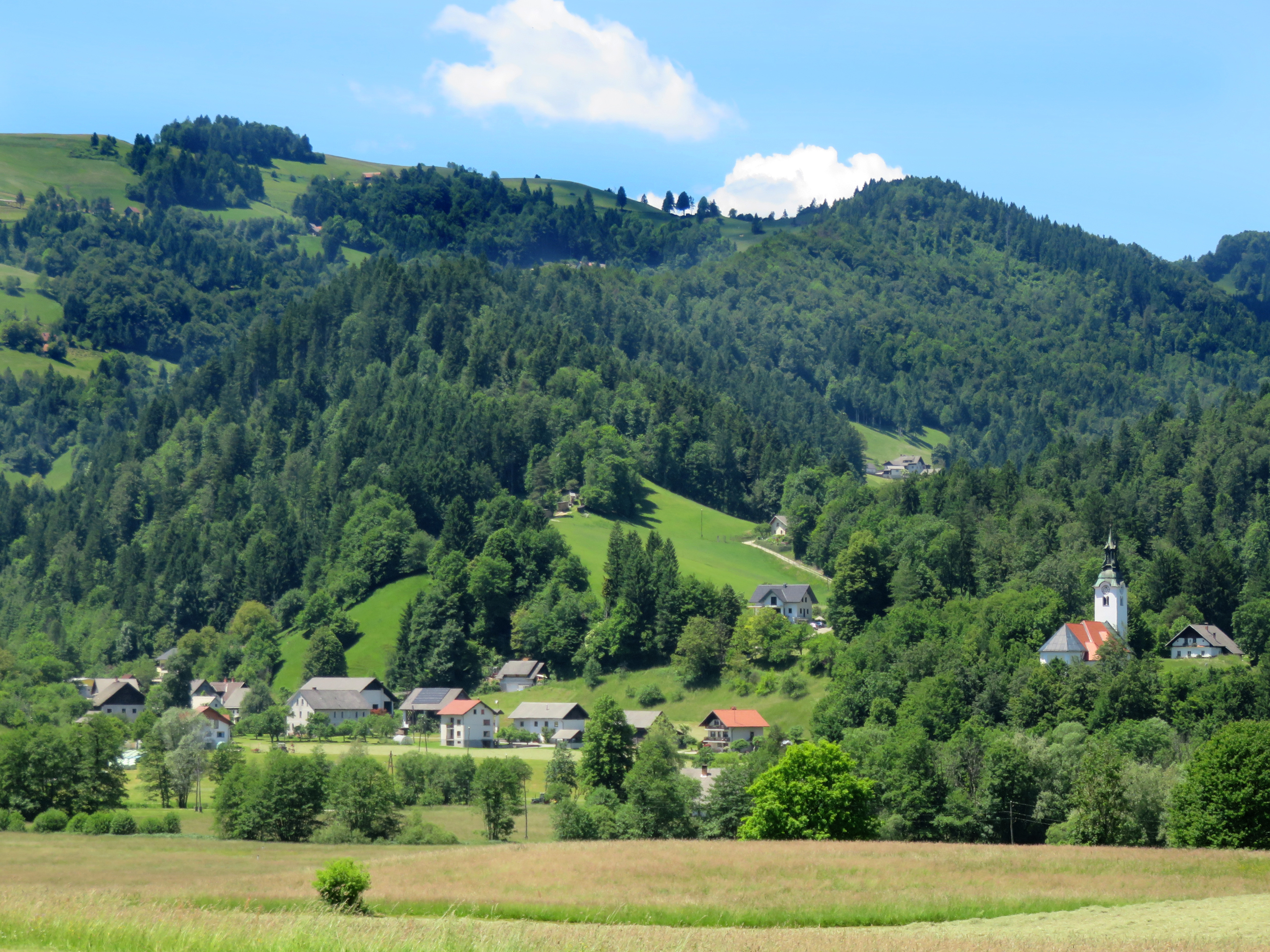

- Location in Slovenia
- Coordinates: 46°3′19.65″N 14°5′44.61″E
- Country: Slovenia
- Traditional region: Upper Carniola
- Statistical region: Upper Carniola
- Municipality: Žiri

Area
  - Total: 1.7 km^{2} (0.66 sq mi)
- Elevation: 483.9 m (1,588 ft)

Population (2002)
  - Total: 78

Ledinica (pronounced [lɛˈdiːnitsa], German: Lediniza) is a small settlement northwest of Žiri in the Upper Carniola region of Slovenia.

== Name ==
Ledinica was attested in historical sources as Ledinitz in 1291, Ledinitzi in 1453, Ledinicz in 1485, and Ledinitzy in 1500. The name is a diminutive of the place name Ledina (cf. also the plural form Ledine), derived from the common noun ledina 'fallow land' and referring to the local geography.

== Church ==
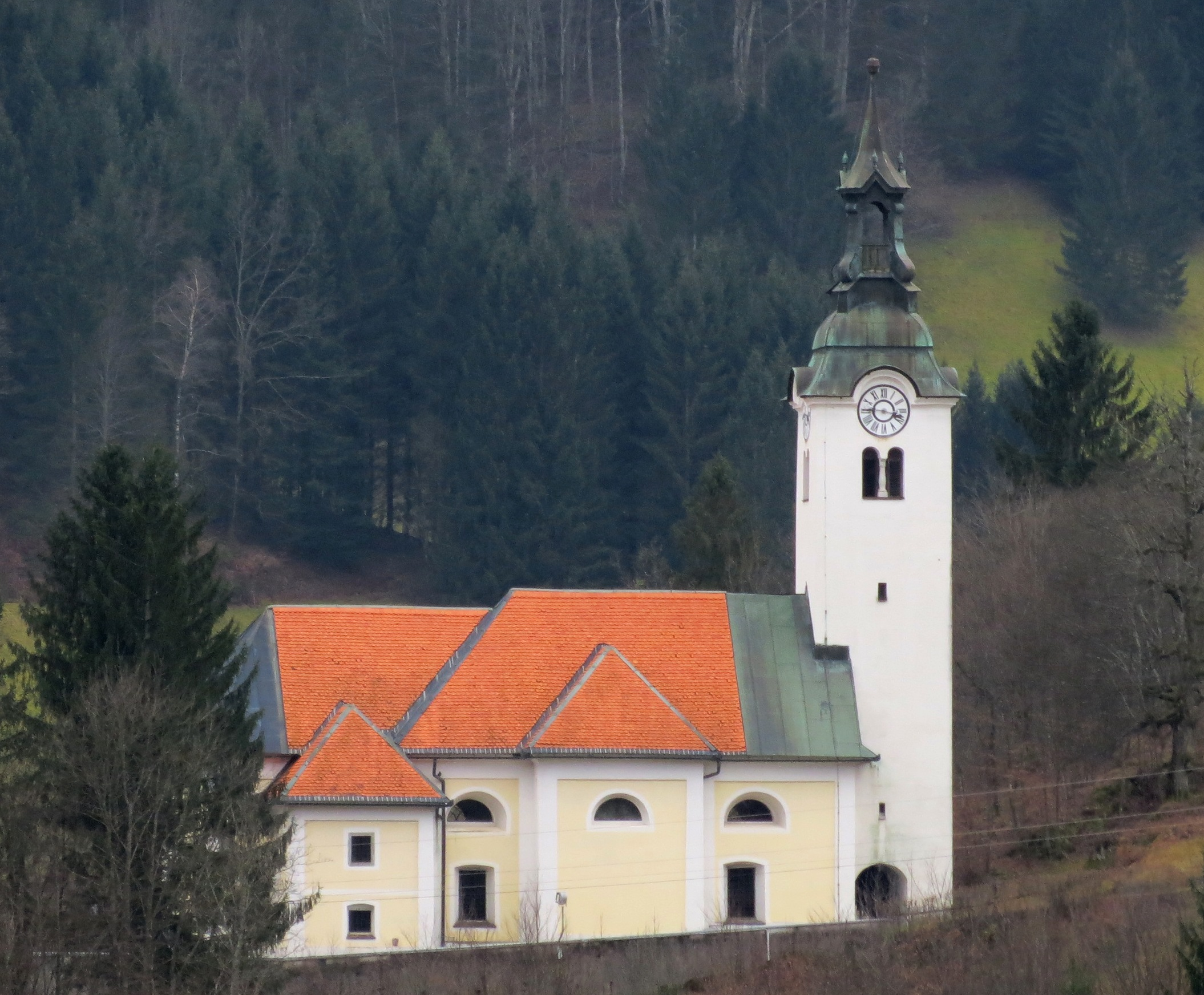
Saint Anne's Church

The local church is built on a hill east of the settlement and is visible from afar. It is dedicated to Saint Anne and is a popular destination among residents of Žiri for short walks. It was first mentioned in written documents dating to 1501 and was originally dedicated to Saint Oswald, but was pulled down in the second half of the 17th century to make way for the current building. It belongs to the Parish of Žiri.
