= Zabrežnik =

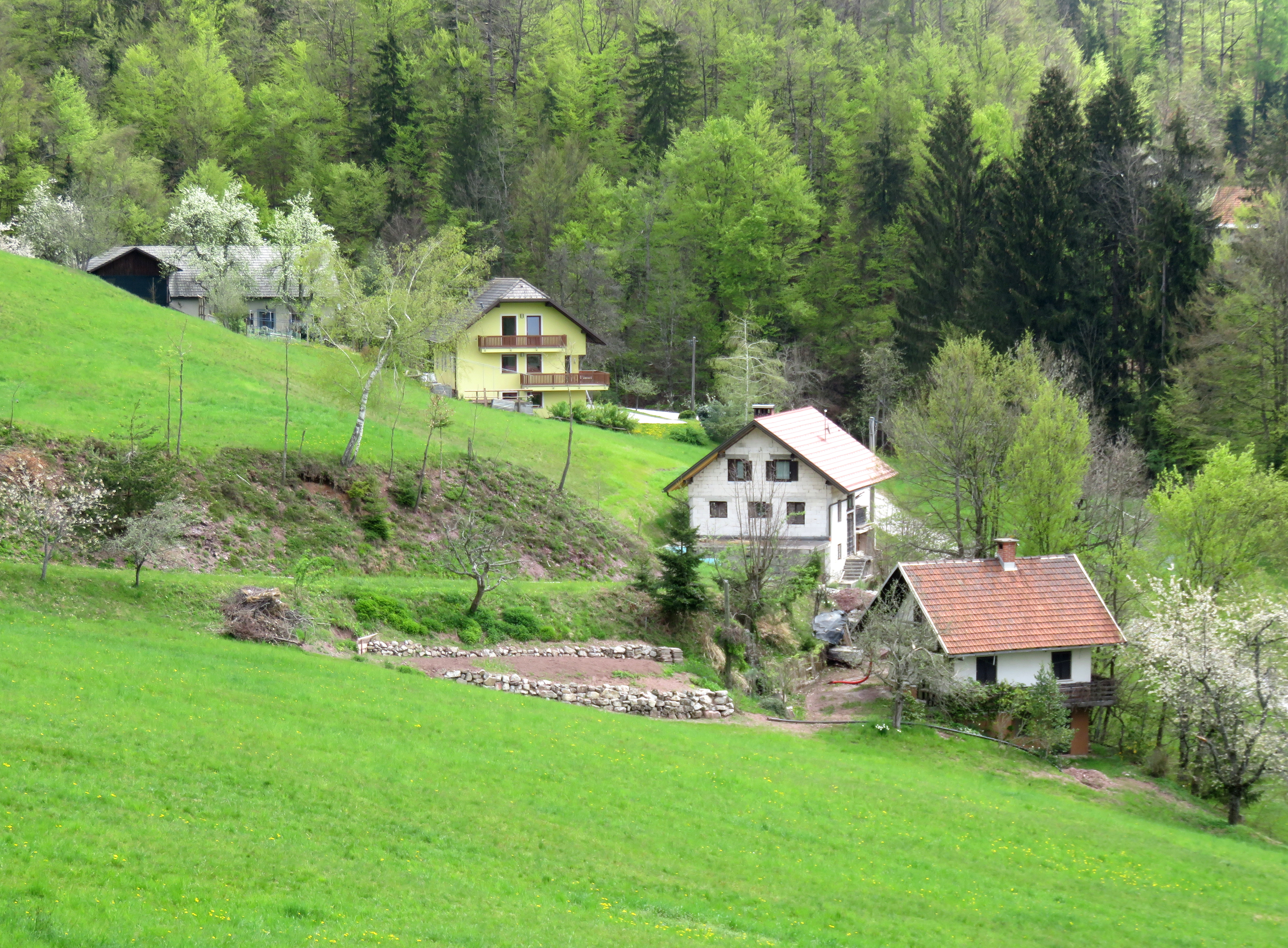

- Location in Slovenia
- Coordinates: 46°4′27.35″N 14°7′8.21″E
- Country: Slovenia
- Traditional region: Upper Carniola
- Statistical region: Upper Carniola
- Municipality: Žiri

Area
  - Total: 1.99 km^{2} (0.77 sq mi)
- Elevation: 721.7 m (2,368 ft)

Population (2002)
  - Total: 33

Zabrežnik (pronounced [zaˈbɾeːʒnik]) is a small dispersed settlement in the hills east of Selo in the Municipality of Žiri in the Upper Carniola region of Slovenia.
