= Goropeke =

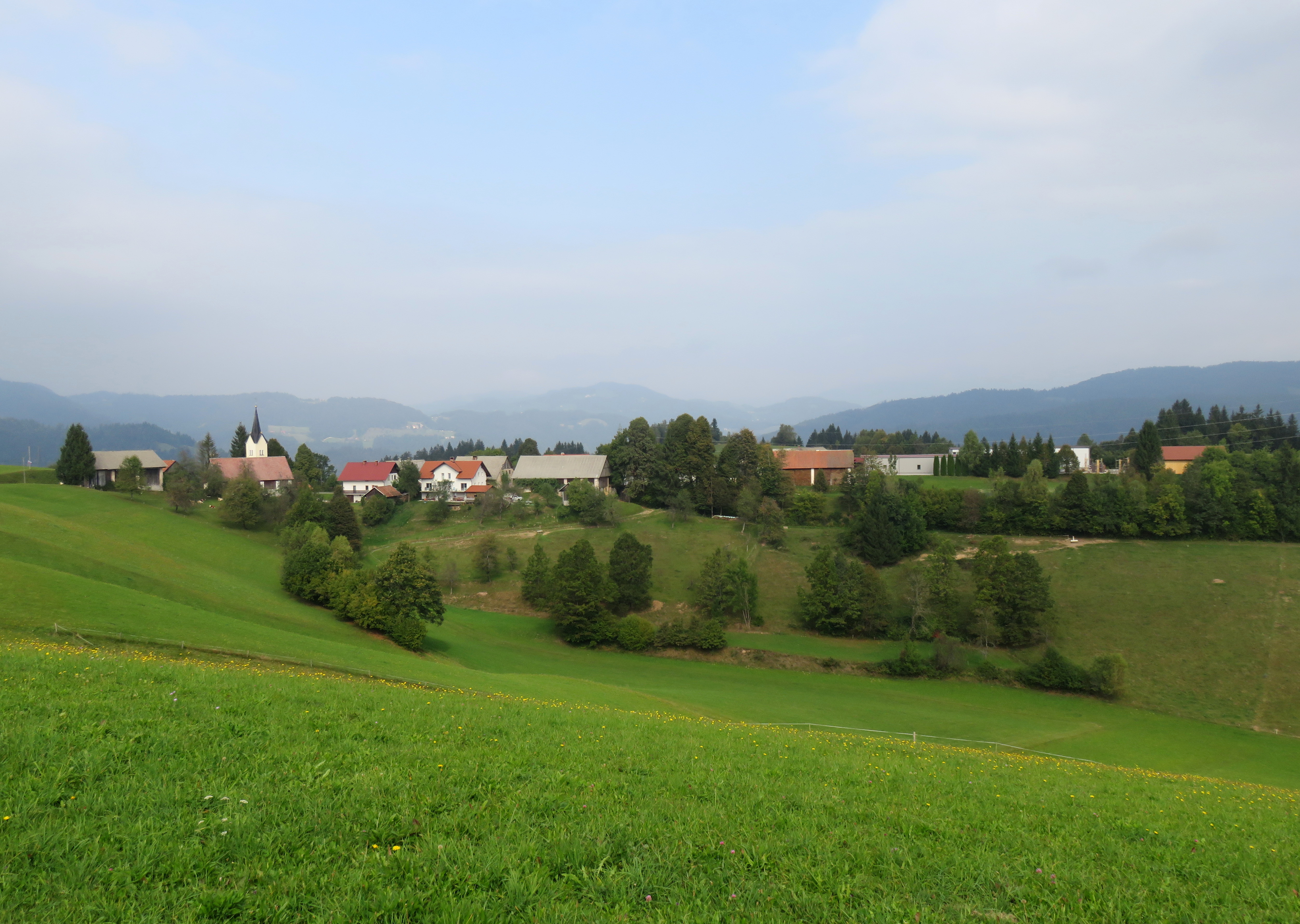

- Location in Slovenia
- Coordinates: 46°2′13.97″N 14°7′16.84″E
- Country: Slovenia
- Traditional region: Upper Carniola
- Statistical region: Upper Carniola
- Municipality: Žiri

Area
  - Total: 1.57 km^{2} (0.61 sq mi)
- Elevation: 683.4 m (2,242 ft)

Population (2002)
  - Total: 57

Goropeke (pronounced [ɡɔɾɔˈpeːkɛ]; German: Ariopek) is a small settlement on a hill immediately south of Žiri in the Upper Carniola region of Slovenia.

== Name ==
Goropeke was attested in written sources as Ragopetsch in 1291 and Gorapetzi in 1500. The original name has been reconstructed as *Rogopeke, an accusative plural of the common noun compound *rogopek (< rog 'mountain, elevation' + peči 'to bake, heat'), thus referring to a sun-exposed location on a hill—which corresponds to the location of the village on the south flank of Goropeke Hill (Slovene: Goropeški grič).

== Church ==
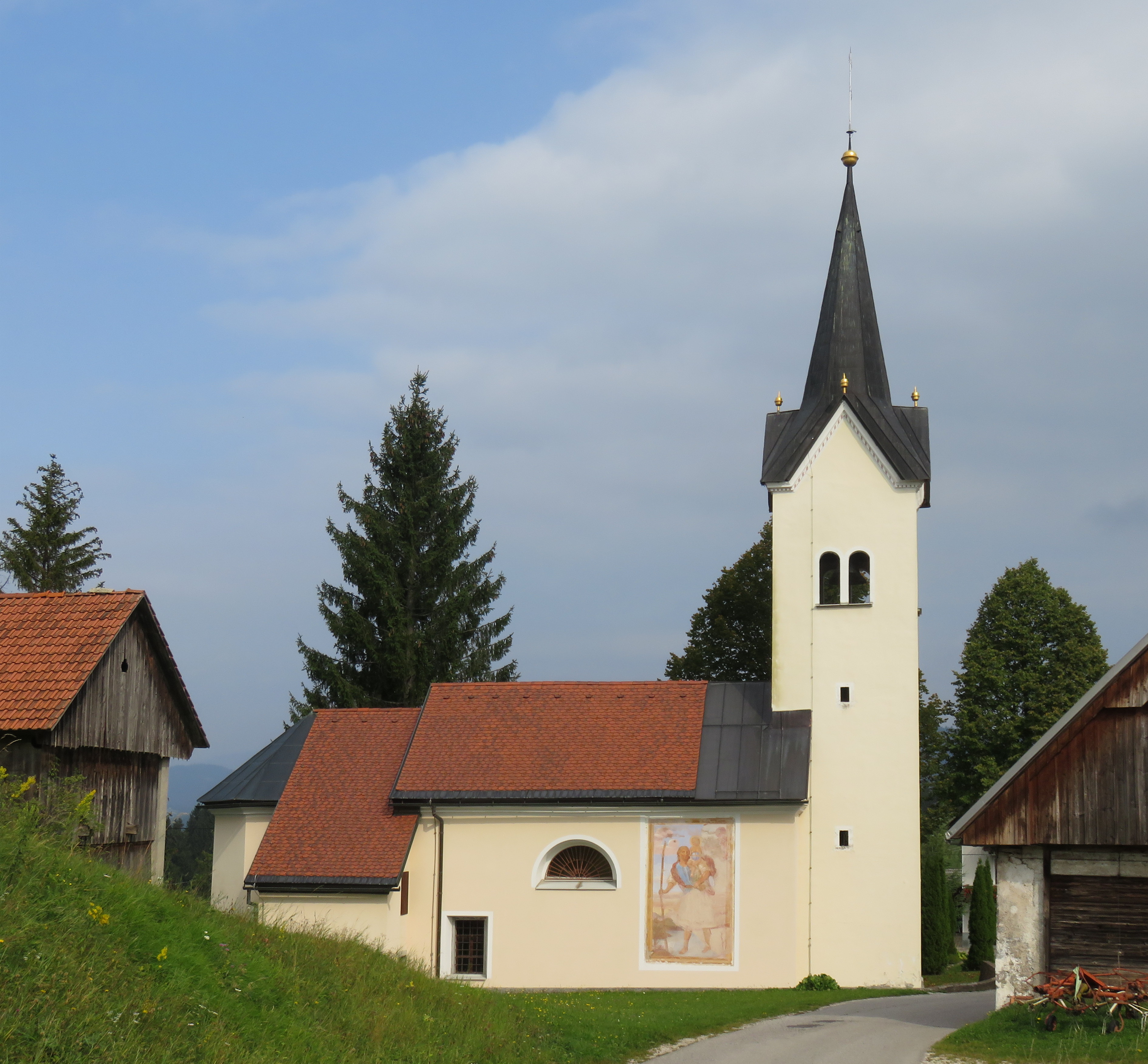
Saint John the Baptist Church

The local church in the settlement is a 15th-century building with some later alterations. It is dedicated to John the Baptist and belongs to the Parish of Žiri.
