= Gorenji Vrsnik =

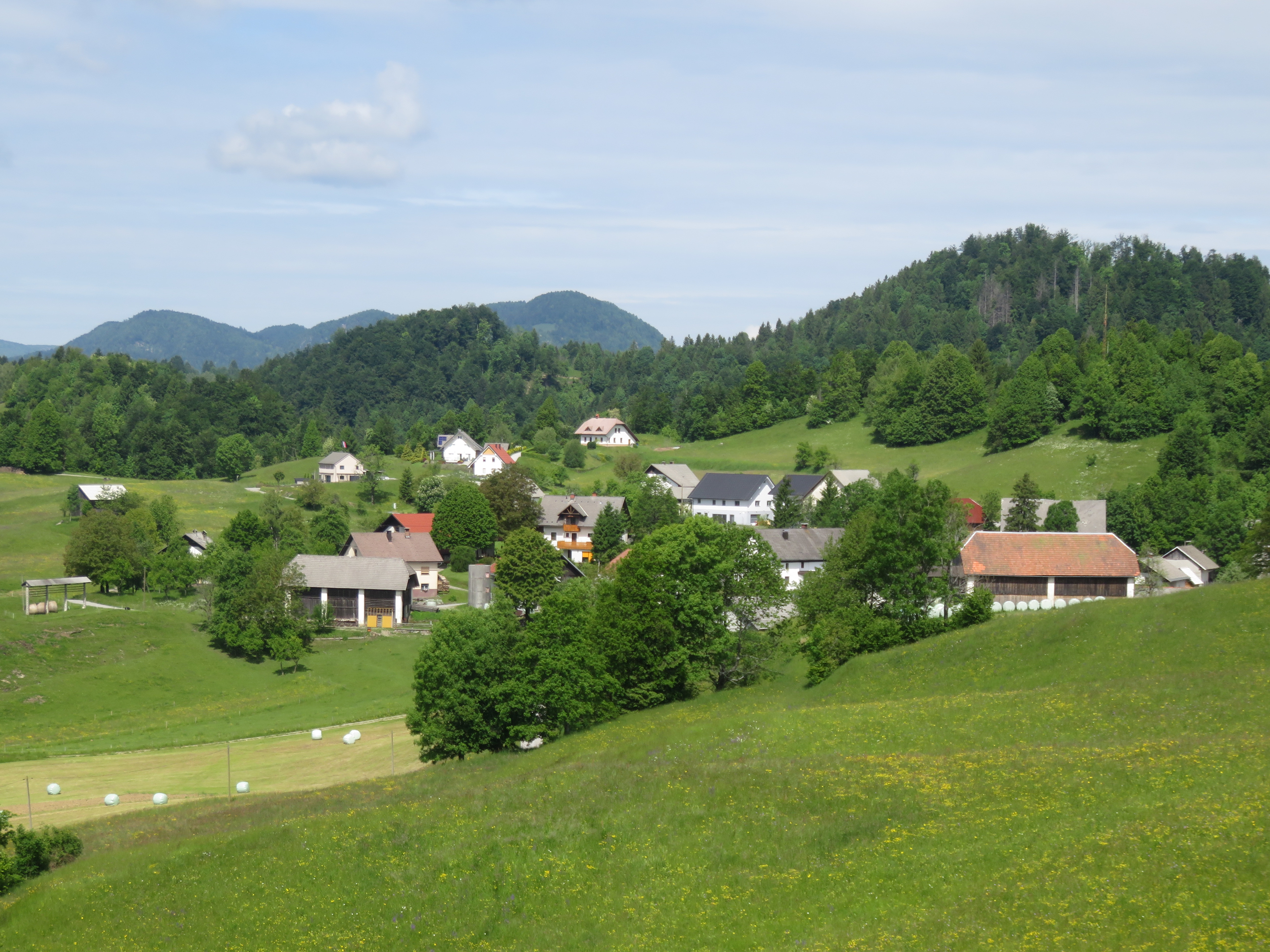

- Location in Slovenia
- Coordinates: 46°1′24.48″N 14°5′21.84″E
- Country: Slovenia
- Traditional region: Inner Carniola
- Statistical region: Gorizia
- Municipality: Idrija

Area
  - Total: 2.79 km^{2} (1.08 sq mi)
- Elevation: 716.6 m (2,351 ft)

Population (2002)
  - Total: 115

Gorenji Vrsnik (pronounced [ɡɔˈɾeːnji ʋəɾˈsniːk], German: Oberwresnik) is a village in the Municipality of Idrija in the traditional Inner Carniola region of Slovenia. It lies off the road from Idrija to Žiri.

== Name ==
The name Gorenji Vrsnik literally means 'upper Vrsnik', contrasting with the neighboring village of Spodnji Vrsnik (literally, 'lower Vrsnik'). Gorenji Vrsnik stands about 40 meters (130 ft) higher in elevation than Spodnji Vrsnik.

== Church ==
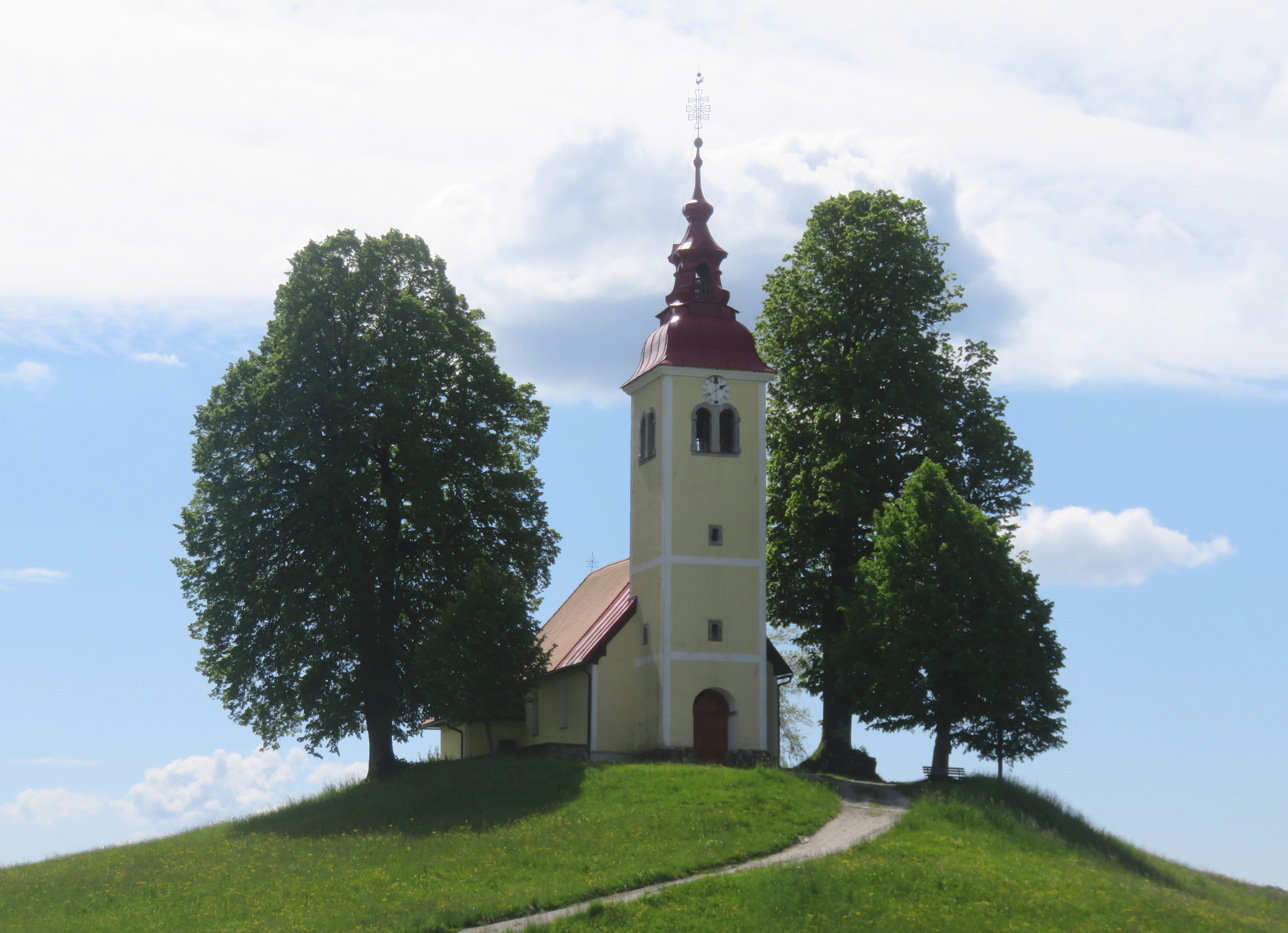
Saint Thomas's Church

The local church is dedicated to Saint Thomas and belongs to the Parish of Ledine.
