= Brekovice =

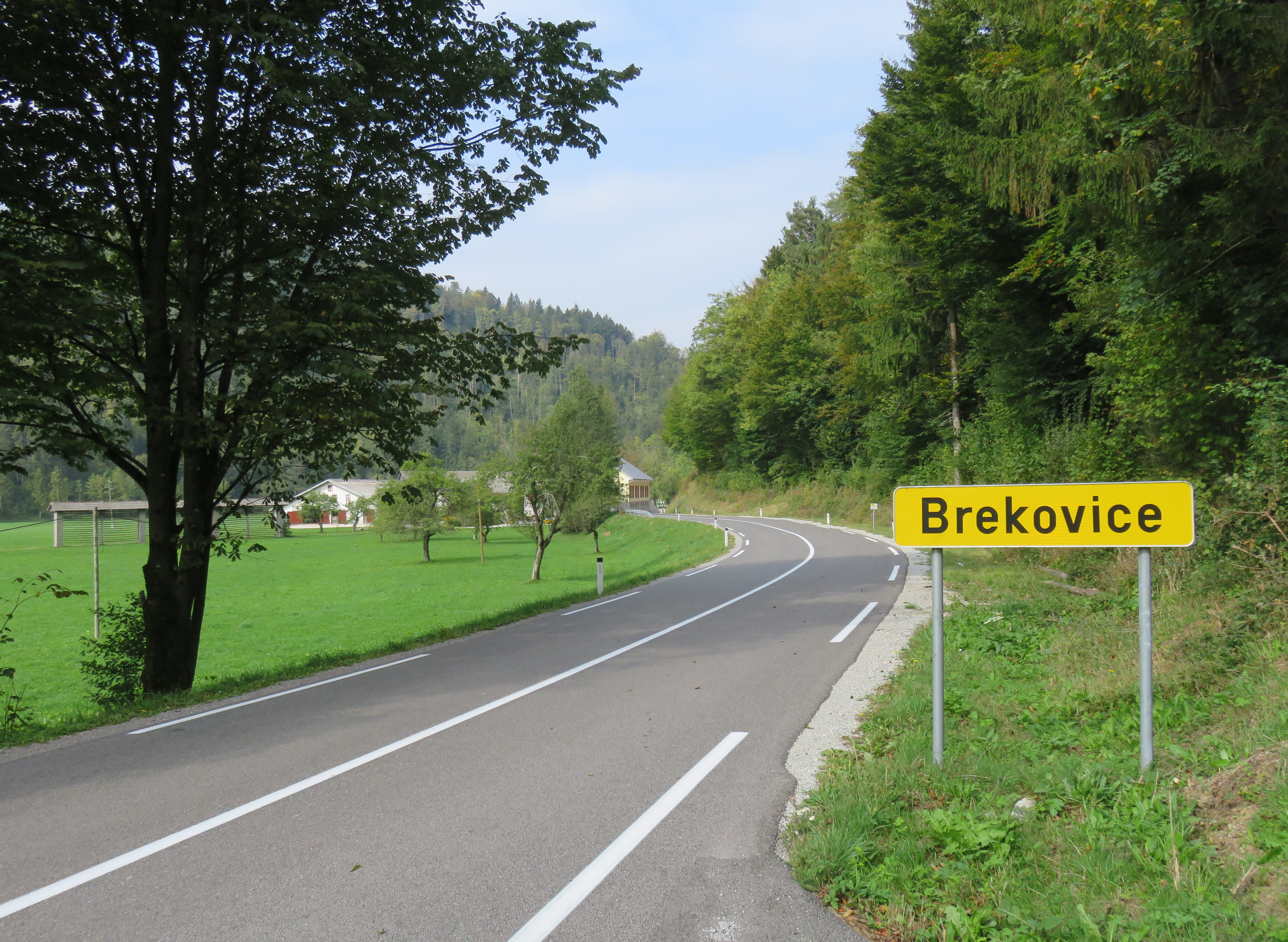

- Location in Slovenia
- Coordinates: 46°1′46.04″N 14°7′7.52″E
- Country: Slovenia
- Traditional region: Upper Carniola
- Statistical region: Upper Carniola
- Municipality: Žiri

Area
  - Total: 1.96 km^{2} (0.76 sq mi)
- Elevation: 492.8 m (1,617 ft)

Population (2002)
  - Total: 61

Brekovice (pronounced [ˈbɾeːkɔʋitsɛ]) is a small dispersed settlement south of Žiri in the Upper Carniola region of Slovenia.

== Name ==
Brekovice was attested in written sources as Wreqniz in 1265, Workhobitz in 1453, and Wrekobtzi in 1500.
