= Martinj Vrh =

Martinj Vrh may refer to:

- Martinj Vrh, Železniki, a settlement in the Municipality of Železniki, Slovenia
- Martinj Vrh, Žiri, a former village in the Municipality of Žiri, Slovenia
