= Selo, Žiri =

Selo
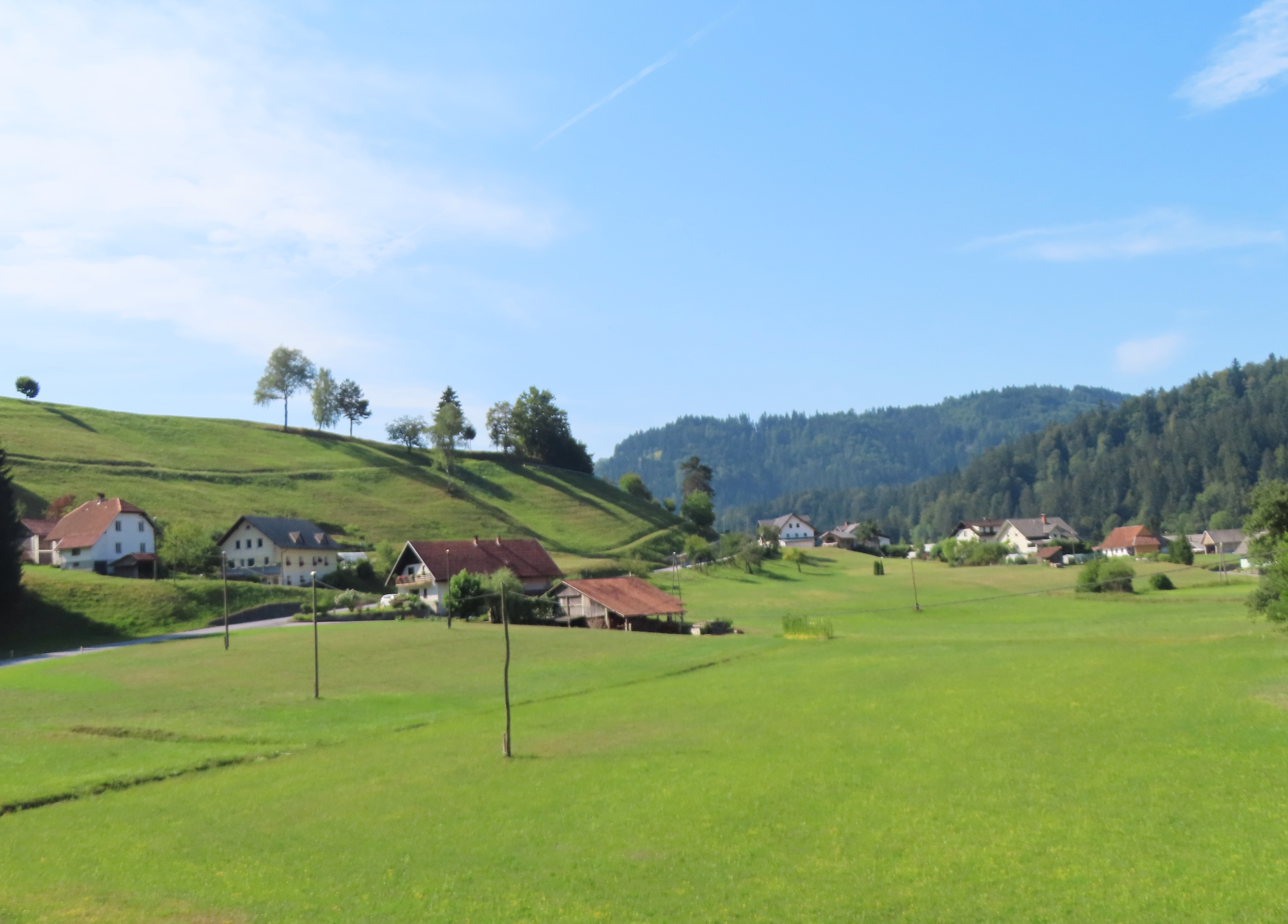

- Location in Slovenia
- Coordinates: 46°3′49.21″N 14°5′55.3″E
- Country: Slovenia
- Traditional region: Upper Carniola
- Statistical region: Upper Carniola
- Municipality: Žiri

Area
  - Total: 1.26 km^{2} (0.49 sq mi)
- Elevation: 491.4 m (1,612 ft)

Population (2002)
  - Total: 279

Selo (pronounced [ˈsɛːlɔ]) is a settlement on the right bank of the Poljane Sora River (Slovene: Poljanska Sora) north of Žiri in the Upper Carniola region of Slovenia.
