= Jarčje Brdo =

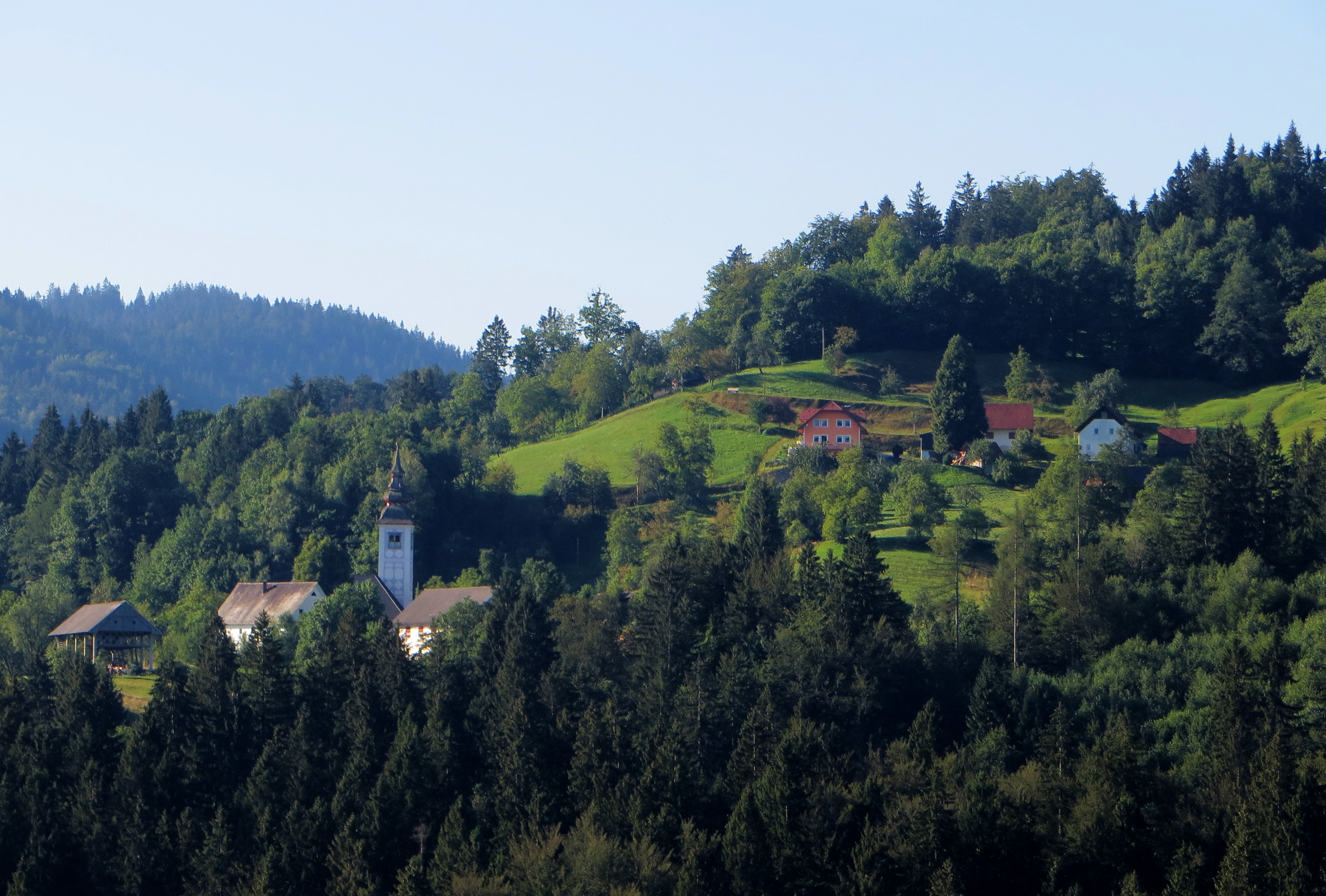

- Location in Slovenia
- Coordinates: 46°10′34.35″N 14°12′18.5″E
- Country: Slovenia
- Traditional region: Upper Carniola
- Statistical region: Upper Carniola
- Municipality: Gorenja Vas–Poljane

Area
  - Total: 1.05 km^{2} (0.41 sq mi)
- Elevation: 664.4 m (2,180 ft)

Population (2020)
  - Total: 25
  - Density: 24/km^{2} (62/sq mi)

Jarčje Brdo (pronounced [ˈjaːɾtʃjɛ ˈbəɾdɔ]; in older sources also Jarče Brdo, German: Jartschinberdo) is a dispersed settlement in the hills between the Selca Sora and the Poljane Sora valleys in the Municipality of Gorenja Vas–Poljane in the Upper Carniola region of Slovenia.

== Name ==
Jarčje Brdo was attested in historical sources as Jartschemwerdi in 1500. The dialect adjective jarčji means 'sheep', and so the name Jarčje Brdo literally means 'sheep hill'.

== Church ==
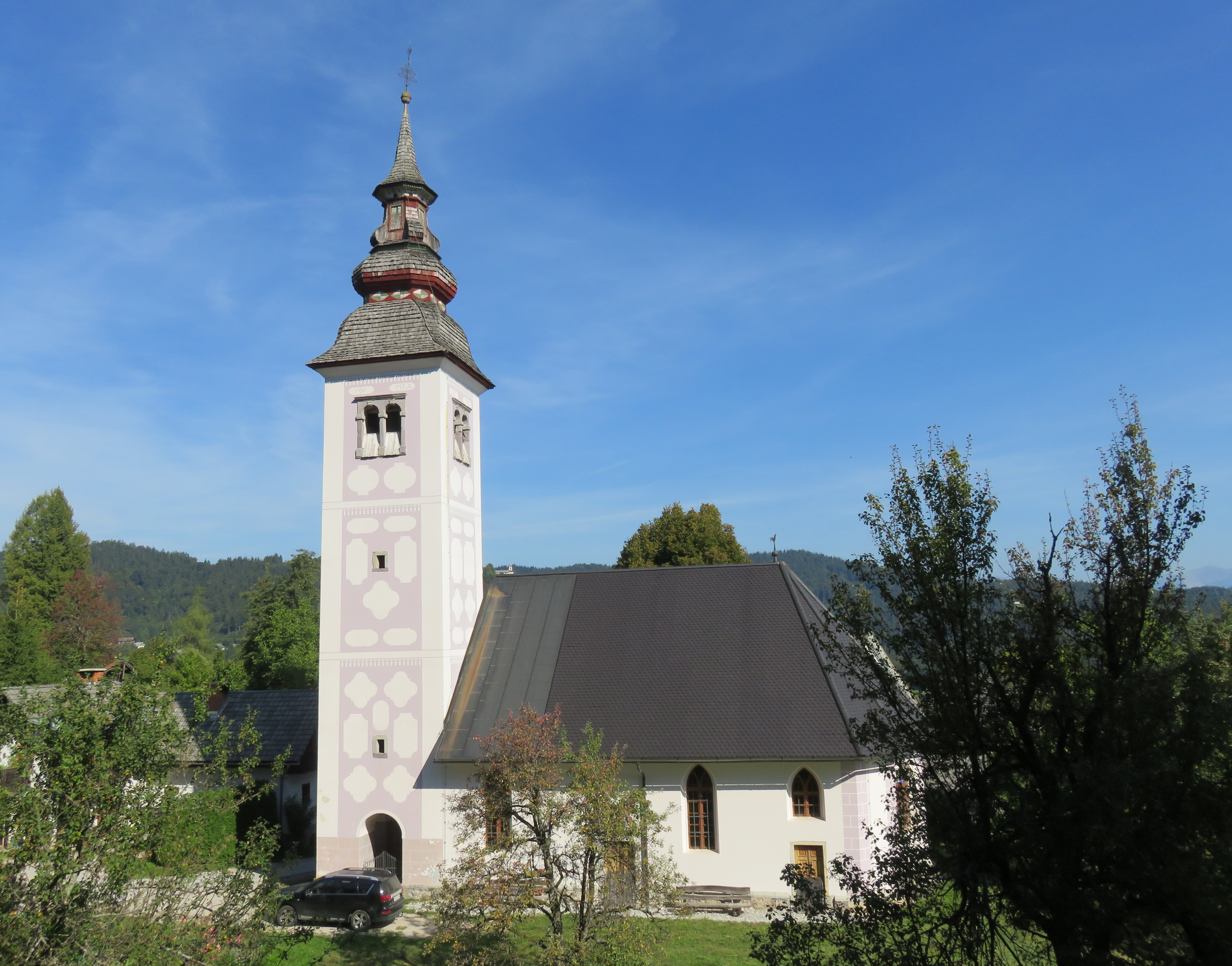
Saint Valentine's Church

The local church is dedicated to Saint Valentine. It was built between 1854 and 1857 on the site of an earlier church and has a triple nave. The belfry from the earlier church, dating to 1728, is preserved.
