= Fužine, Gorenja Vas–Poljane =

Fužine
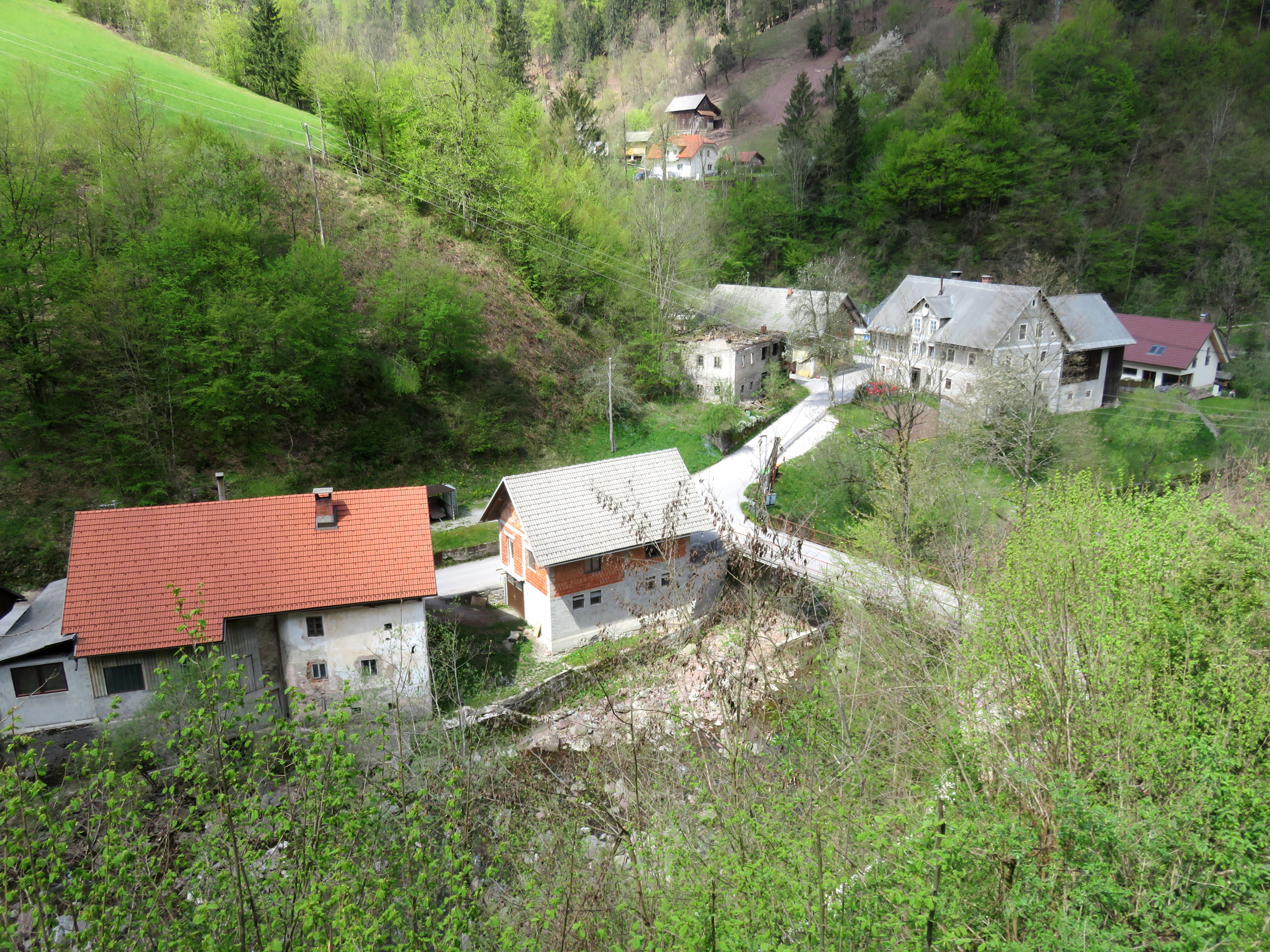

- Location in Slovenia
- Coordinates: 46°5′11.99″N 14°5′37.19″E
- Country: Slovenia
- Traditional region: Upper Carniola
- Statistical region: Upper Carniola
- Municipality: Gorenja Vas–Poljane

Area
  - Total: 1.82 km^{2} (0.70 sq mi)
- Elevation: 449.7 m (1,475 ft)

Population (2020)
  - Total: 116
  - Density: 63.7/km^{2} (165/sq mi)

Fužine (pronounced [fuˈʒiːnɛ]) is a small settlement in the upper valley of the Poljane Sora River in the Municipality of Gorenja Vas–Poljane in the Upper Carniola region of Slovenia.

Since 1924 a small hydroelectric power plant has been operating on the river in the settlement.
