= Izgorje =

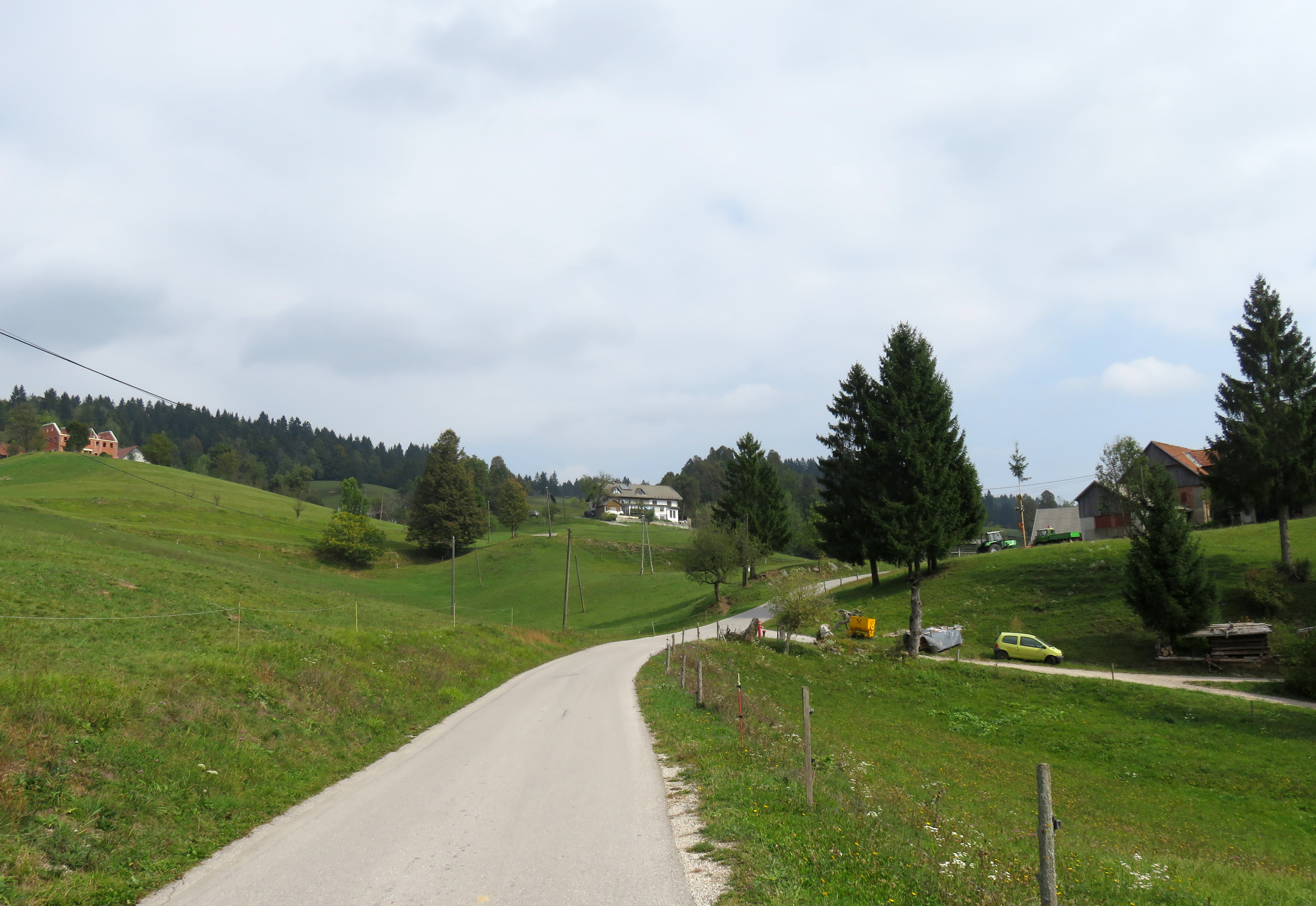

- Location in Slovenia
- Coordinates: 46°0′36.24″N 14°8′12.31″E
- Country: Slovenia
- Traditional region: Upper Carniola
- Statistical region: Upper Carniola
- Municipality: Žiri

Area
  - Total: 1.43 km^{2} (0.55 sq mi)
- Elevation: 640.9 m (2,103 ft)

Population (2002)
  - Total: 29

Izgorje (pronounced [ˈiːzɡɔɾjɛ]) is a small dispersed settlement in the hills south of Žiri in the Upper Carniola region of Slovenia.

== Name ==
Izgorje was attested in written sources as Isgeori in 1500.
