= Spodnji Vrsnik =

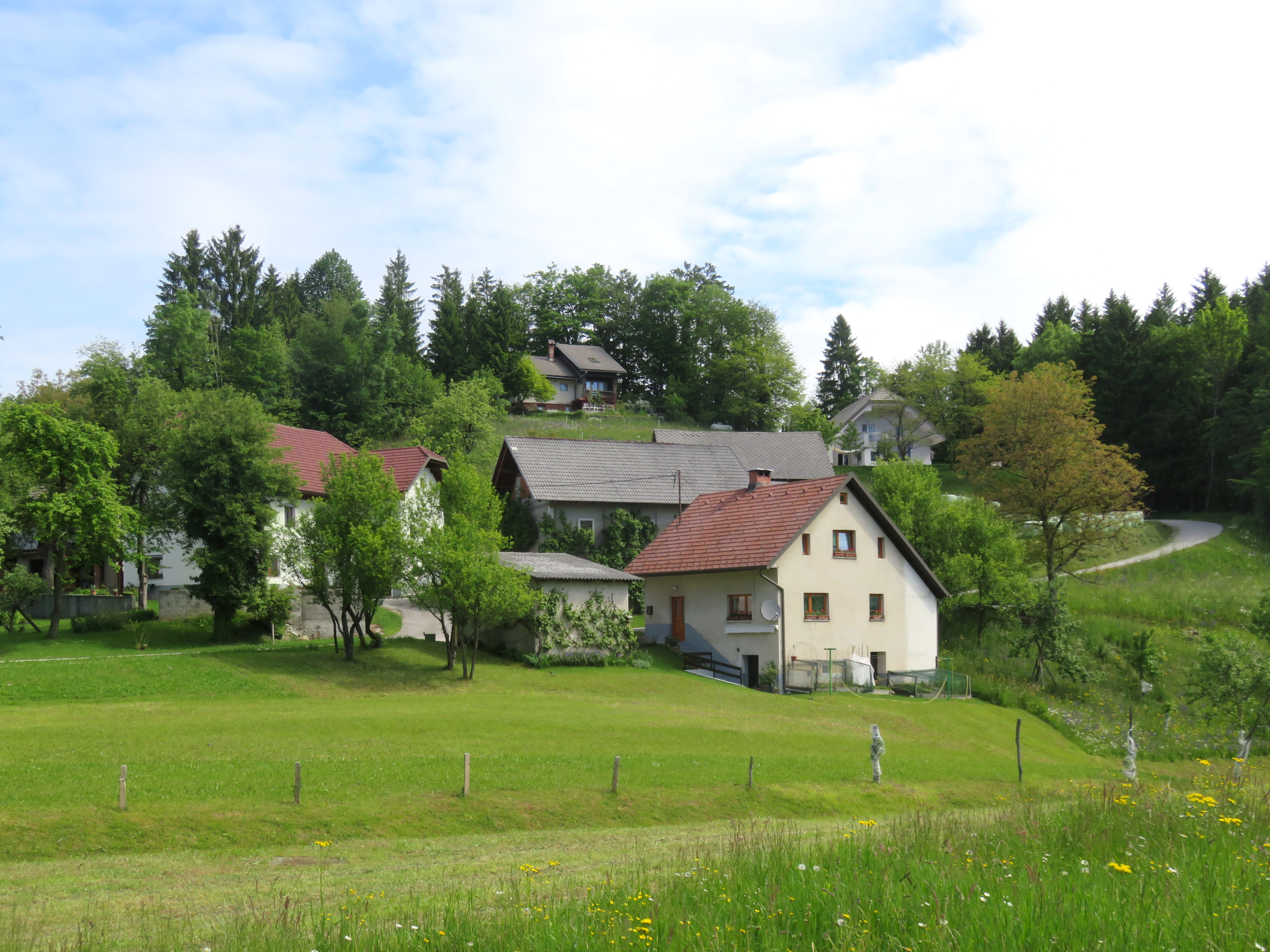

- Location in Slovenia
- Coordinates: 46°1′5.98″N 14°5′58.41″E
- Country: Slovenia
- Traditional region: Inner Carniola
- Statistical region: Gorizia
- Municipality: Idrija

Area
  - Total: 1.58 km^{2} (0.61 sq mi)
- Elevation: 684.5 m (2,246 ft)

Population (2002)
  - Total: 51

Spodnji Vrsnik (pronounced [ˈspoːdnji ʋəɾˈsniːk], German: Unterwresnik) is a small settlement next to Gorenji Vrsnik in the hills east of Idrija in the traditional Inner Carniola region of Slovenia.

== Name ==
The name Spodnji Vrsnik literally means 'lower Vrsnik', contrasting with the neighboring village of Gorenji Vrsnik (literally, 'upper Vrsnik'). Spodnji Vrsnik stands about 40 meters (130 ft) lower in elevation than Gorenji Vrsnik.
