= Municipality of Žiri =

Municipality of Slovenia

Municipality of Žiri Občina Žiri
- Municipality
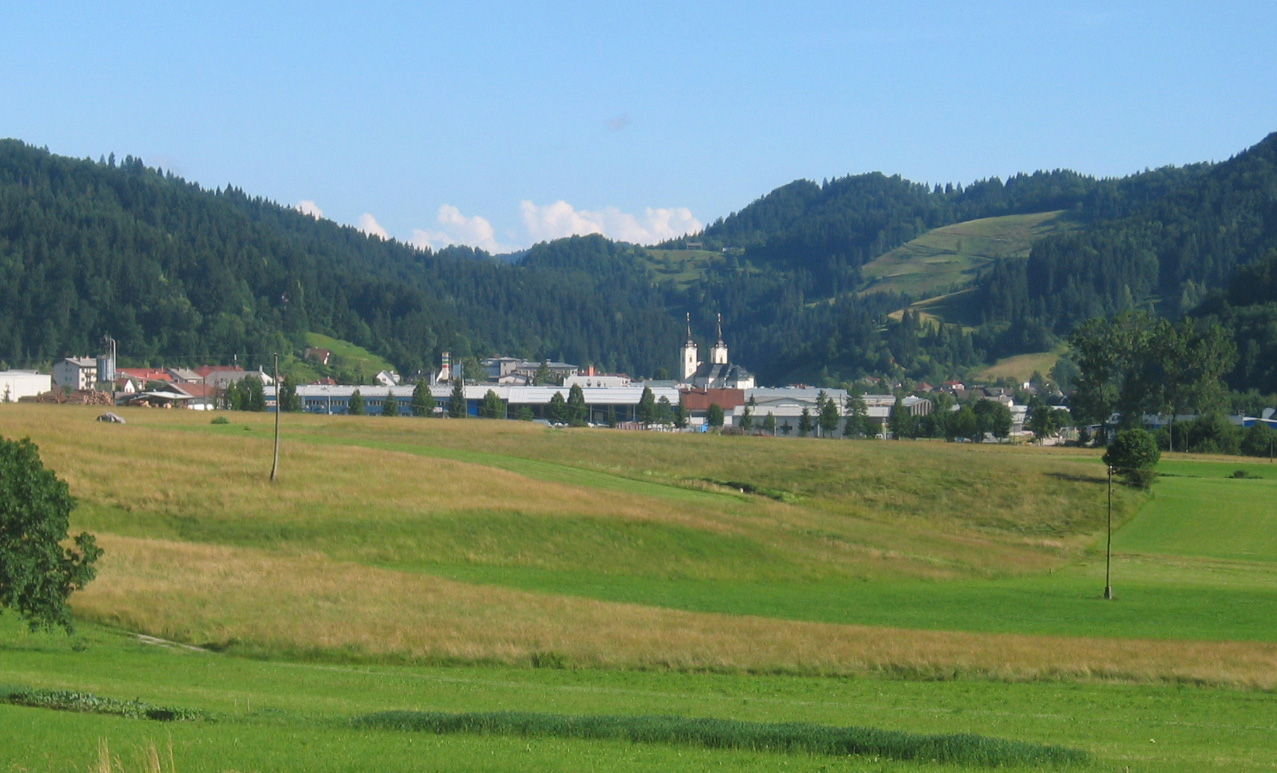

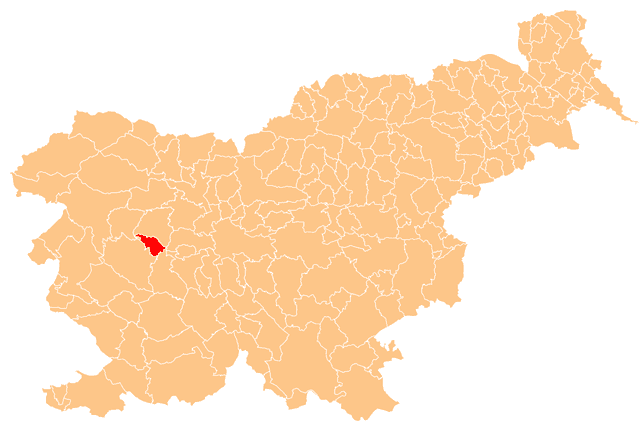
- Location of the Municipality of Žiri in Slovenia
- Coordinates: 46°03′N 14°06′E
- Country: Slovenia
- Traditional region: Upper Carniola
- Statistical region: Upper Carniola

Government
  - Mayor: Janez Žakelj

Area
  - Total: 49 km^{2} (19 sq mi)

Population (2011)
  - Total: 4,895
  - Density: 100/km^{2} (260/sq mi)
- Time zone: UTC+01 (CET)
  - Summer (DST): UTC+02 (CEST)
- Website: www.ziri.si

The Municipality of Žiri (pronounced [ʒiˈɾiː] or [ˈʒiːɾi]; Slovene: Občina Žiri) is a municipality in northwestern Slovenia. The seat of the municipality is the town of Žiri. The area is part of the traditional Upper Carniola region. The entire municipality is now included in the Upper Carniola Statistical Region.

== History ==
In 2022, torrential rains caused locally extreme flooding in the Municipality of Žiri.

== Settlements ==
In addition to the municipal seat of Žiri, the municipality also includes the following settlements:

- Brekovice
- Breznica pri Žireh
- Goropeke
- Izgorje
- Jarčja Dolina
- Koprivnik
- Ledinica
- Mrzli Vrh
- Opale
- Osojnica
- Podklanec
- Račeva
- Ravne pri Žireh
- Selo
- Sovra
- Zabrežnik
- Žirovski Vrh
