= Sora (river) =

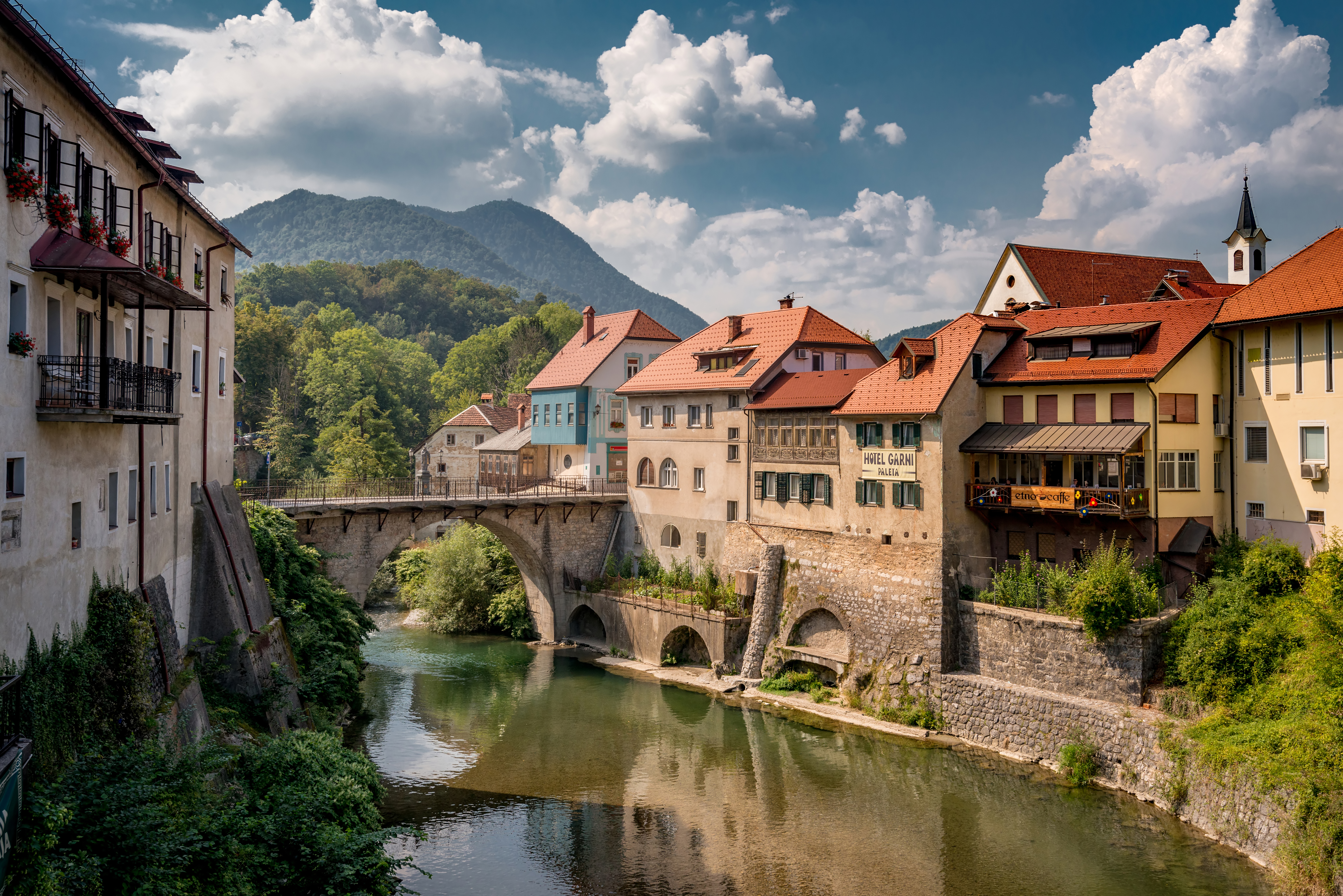
- The Selca Sora under the Capuchin Bridge, Škofja Loka, just above its confluence with the Poljane Sora (2008)

Location
- Country: Slovenia

Physical characteristics
- Source
  - location: confluence of Selca Sora (Selščica) and Poljane Sora (Poljanščica)
  - elevation: 330 m (1,080 ft)
- Mouth
  - location: Sava (near Medvode)
  - coordinates: 46.1391°N 14.4159°E
  - elevation: 308 m (1,010 ft)
- Length: 9 km (5.6 mi)
- Basin size: 636 km^{2} (246 sq mi)
- Discharge
  - average: 25 m^{3}/s (880 cu ft/s) (at the outflow)

Basin features
- Progression: Sava→ Danube→ Black Sea

The Sora (German: Zayer or Zeier) is a right affluent of the Sava River in western Slovenia. The Sora gathers its waters mainly from the Škofja Loka Hills. Its source branches are the Poljane Sora (Slovene: Poljanska Sora, also Poljanščica), named after the Poljane Valley (Poljanska dolina), and the Selca Sora (Slovene: Selška Sora, also Selščica), named after the Selca Valley (Selška dolina). The Poljane Sora is larger and is 43 kilometres (27 mi) in length, while the Selca Sora is 32 km (20 mi) in length. They flow together in Škofja Loka and continue the flow as the Sora for the next 9.2 kilometres (5.7 mi) until Medvode, where the Sora joins the Sava. Including the Poljane Sora, the Sora is 52 km (32 mi) in length. This makes it the 15th longest river of Slovenia.

The Sora is of torrential character and often floods. Its average discharge at the outflow is 25 cubic metres per second (880 cu ft/s). Its largest discharge, measured in 1990, was 690 m^{3}/s (24,000 cu ft/s).

== Name ==
The Sora was attested in historical sources as Zuora and Zoura in 973, and Zevra in 1263. The name is derived from the common noun *sǫvьra from the verb *sъ-vьrěti, which can be understood in the sense 'to gush, swell up', referring to the river's propensity to flood, or in the sense 'to surge together', initially referring to the confluence of the Poljane Sora and Selca Sora.

== History ==
In 2022, torrential rains caused the river to flood, with unusually severe flooding downstream.
