= Žiri =

- Town
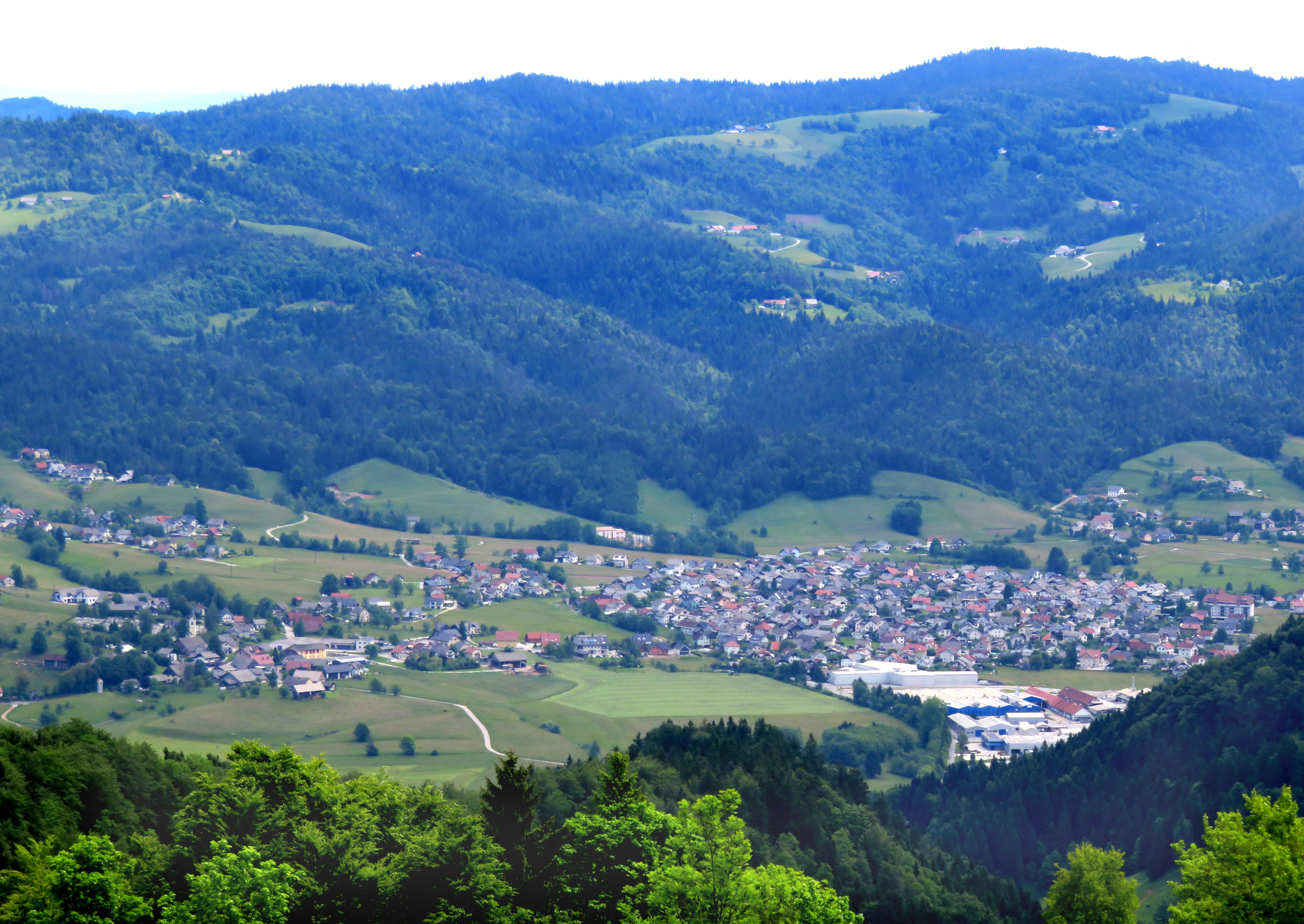
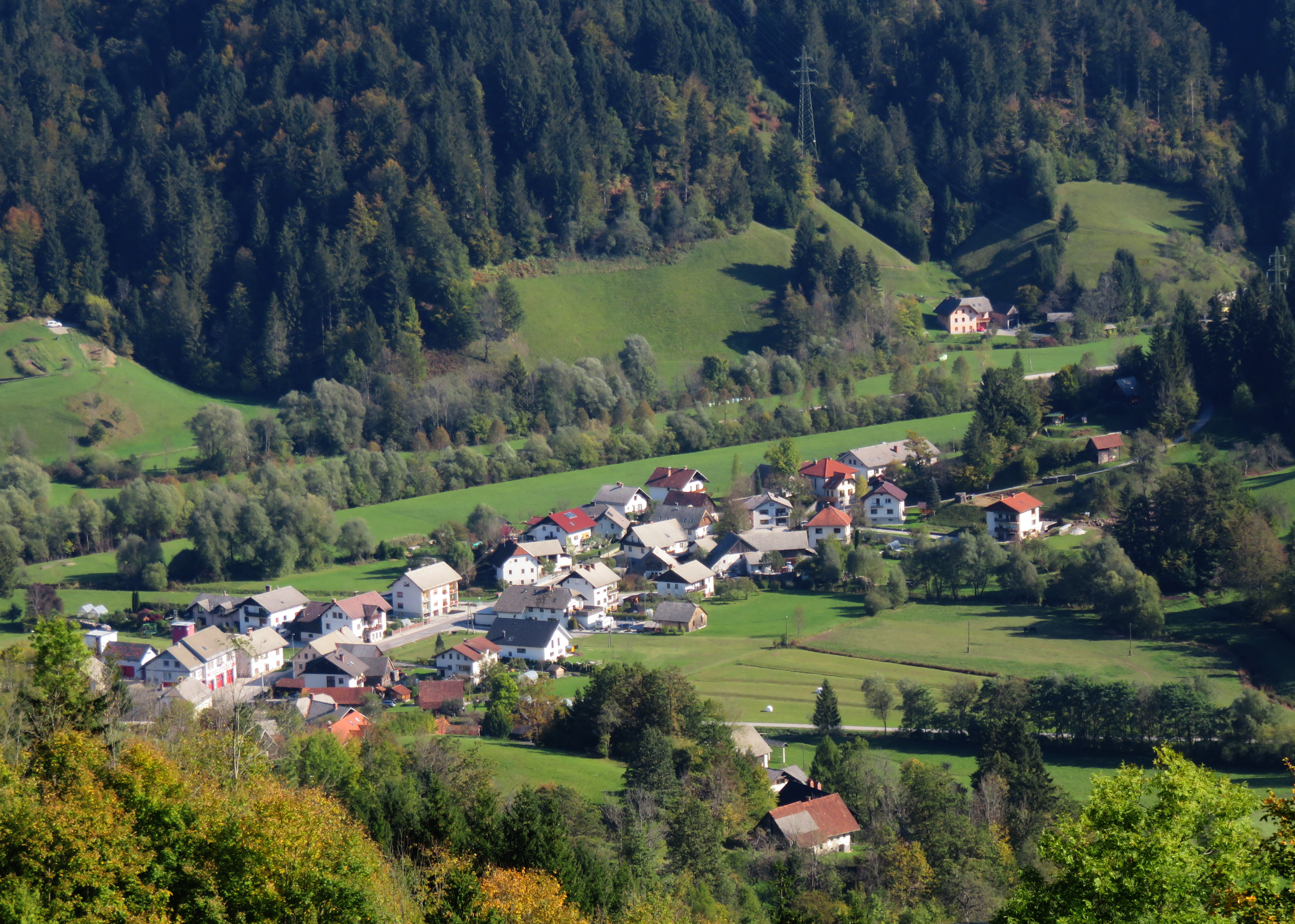
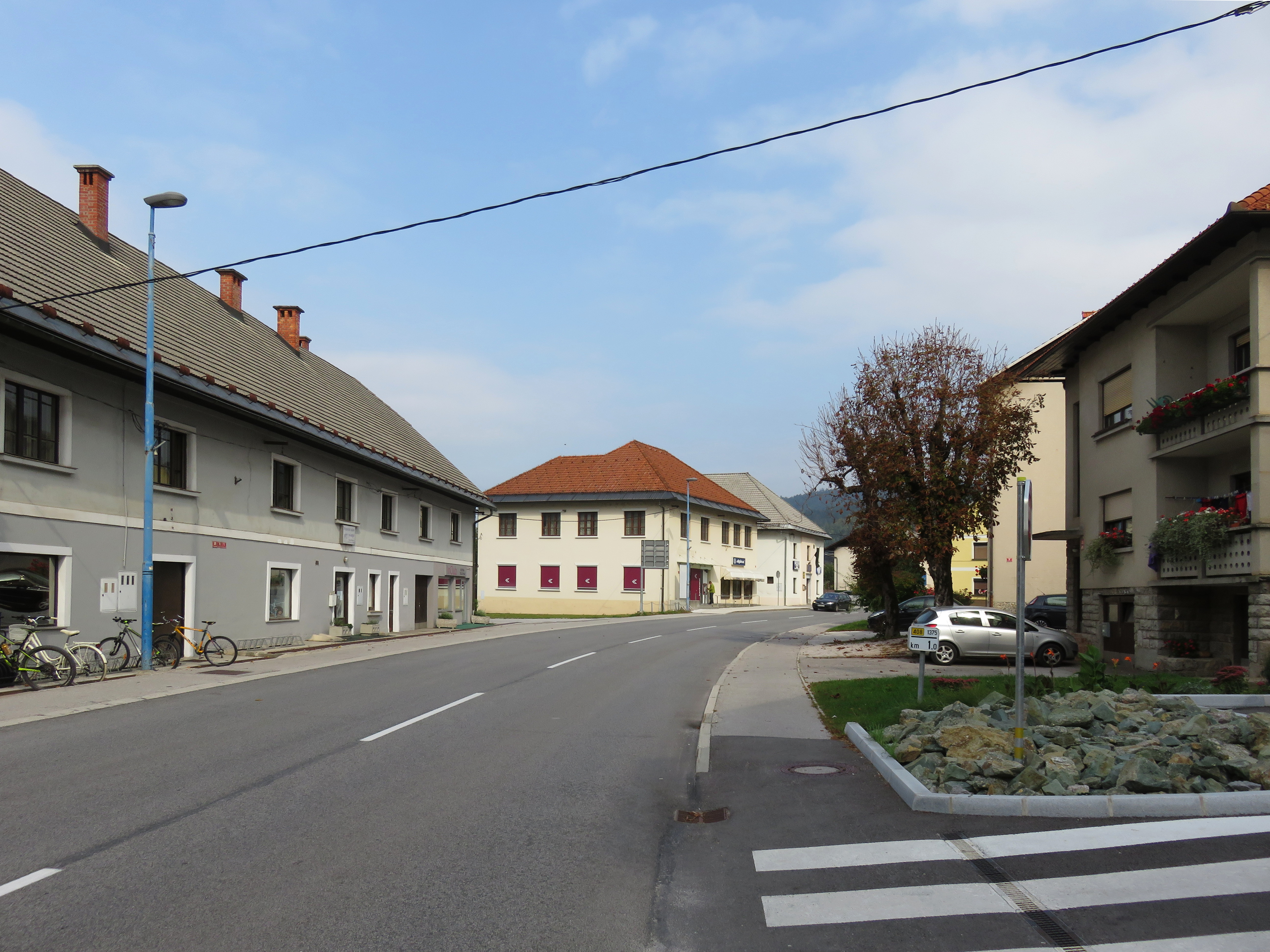
- From top, left to right: Žiri, Stare Žiri from above, Stara Vas

- Flag Coat of arms

- Location in Slovenia
- Coordinates: 46°2′49″N 14°6′35″E
- Country: Slovenia
- Traditional region: Upper Carniola
- Statistical region: Upper Carniola
- Municipality: Žiri

Area
  - Total: 7.87 km^{2} (3.04 sq mi)
- Elevation: 478.7 m (1,571 ft)

Population (2025)
  - Total: 3,777

Žiri (pronounced [ʒiˈɾíː]; formerly also Žir, locally Žier, German: Sairach) is a town in northwestern Slovenia. It is the administrative seat of the Municipality of Žiri, created in 1994. Prior to this the town belonged administratively to the area of Škofja Loka.

== Location ==
The town of Žiri lies in the extreme southwest part of the Upper Carniola region on the borders with the Inner Carniola and the Littoral regions in the Žiri Basin (Slovene: Žirovska kotlina) at the end of the Poljane Valley (Poljanska dolina). A number of tributaries join there to become the Poljane Sora (Poljanska Sora).

== Name ==
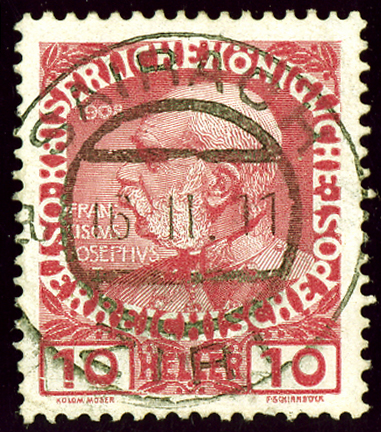
Bilingual name (Sairach and Žiri) on a 1911 postmark

The name of the settlement was first attested in 1291 as Syroch (and as Seyroch in 1307 and Syroch in 1318). It is probably derived from a plural form of the hypocorism *Žirъ, and the name would therefore mean 'Žir and his people'. An alternative, less likely theory, connects the name to the Slovene common noun žir 'beech nuts'. The town was known as Sairach in German.

== History ==
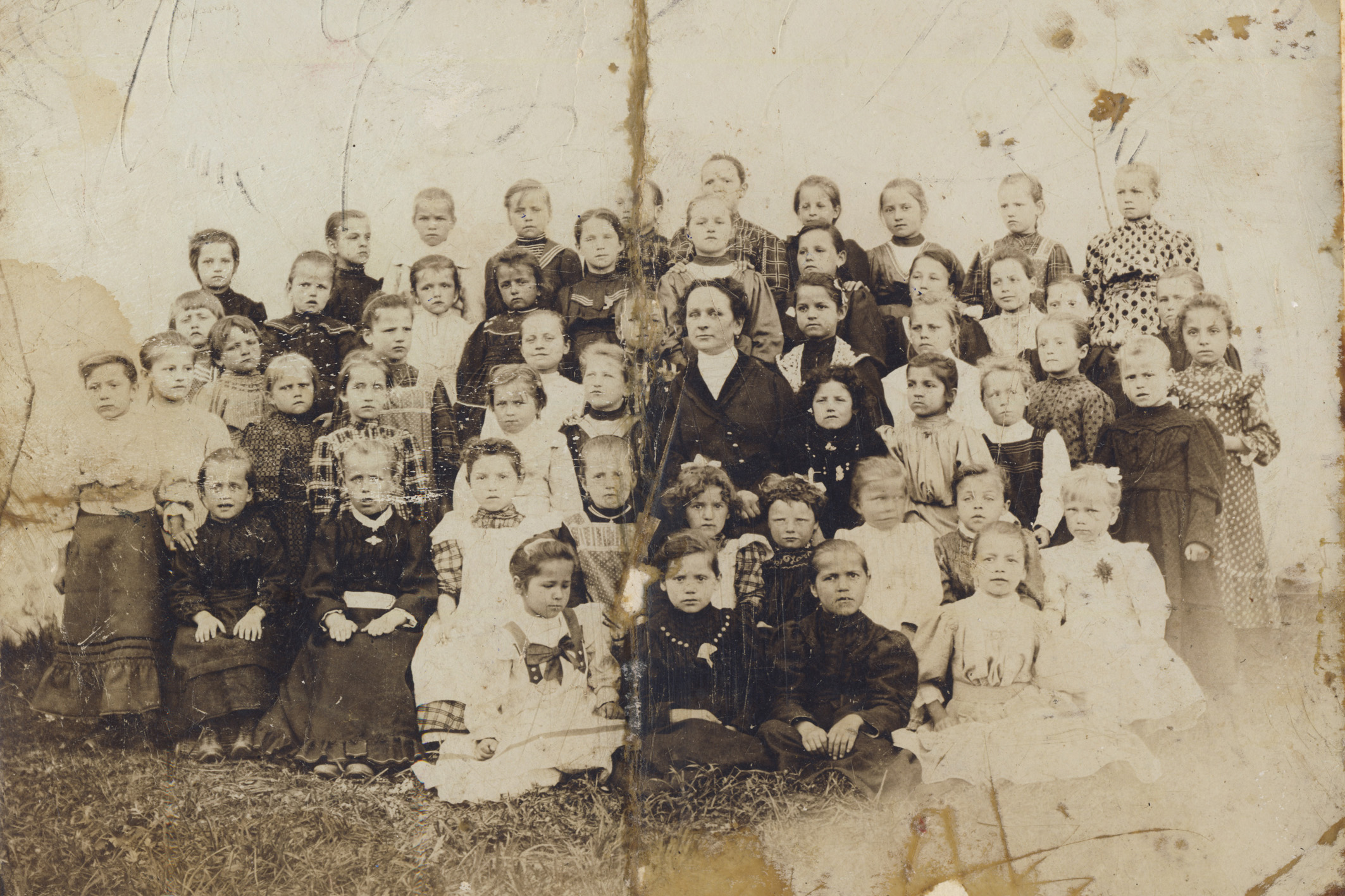
Students of a lace school with their teacher Leopoldina Pelhan (adult woman in the middle in black) in 1906

An Austrian post office was established in Žiri in 1871 as Sairach, district of Loitsch (Logatec). The Slovene name was added to the postal name at the end of the 19th century. The village has an elementary school and a lace school that has existed for over a hundred years. The first teacher at the lace school was Leopoldina Pelhan, who taught in Žiri for 30 years. Among her students was the lacemaker and designer Frančiška Giacomelli Gantar.

Historical population
Year	1948	1953	1961	1971	1981	1991	2002	2011	2021
Pop.	598	651	667	627	577	3,442	3,593	3,588	3,654
±%	—	+8.9%	+2.5%	−6.0%	−8.0%	+496.5%	+4.4%	−0.1%	+1.8%
Population size may be affected by changes in administrative divisions.

== Church ==
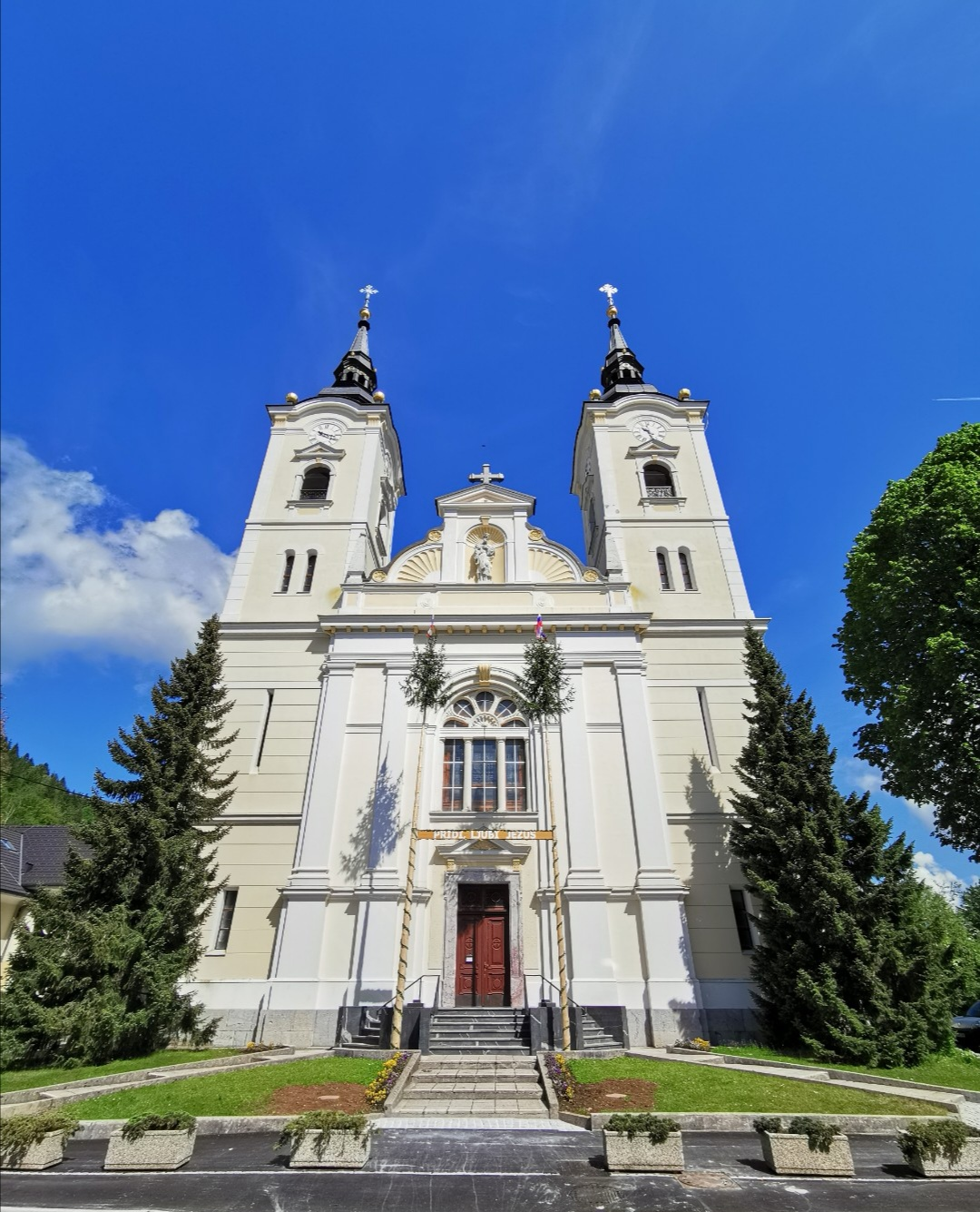
Saint Martin's Church

The parish church in the town of Žiri is dedicated to Saint Martin and belongs to the Archdiocese of Ljubljana.

== Notable people ==
Notable people that were born or lived in Žiri include:

- Leopold Suhodolčan (1928–1980), writer
- Frančiška Giacomelli Gantar (1905–1988), Slovenian bobbin lacemaker, drafter, and designer
- Leopoldina Pelhan (1880–1947), Slovenian bobbin lacemaker, teacher, and designer
