= Upper Carniola Statistical Region =

Coordinates: 46°19′00″N 14°09′00″E

Upper Carniola Statistical Region gorenjska statistična regija
- Statistical region
- Municipalities: 18
- Largest city: Kranj

Area
  - Total: 2,137 km^{2} (825 sq mi)

Population (2020)
  - Total: 206,621
  - Density: 96.69/km^{2} (250.4/sq mi)

Statistics
  - Households: 77253
  - Employed: 72391
  - Registered unemployed: 8549
  - College/university students: 8298
  - Regional GDP (2019): EUR 4,276 bn (EUR 20,790 per capita)
- HDI (2022): 0.919 very high · 3rd

The Upper Carniola Statistical Region (Slovene: gorenjska statistična regija) is a statistical region in northwest Slovenia. It is a region with high mountains, including Mount Triglav, and is almost entirely Alpine. A large part of this statistical region is protected as a national park. The relief and climate are good bases for tourism. In 2013, the region recorded almost 19% of tourist nights in Slovenia, of which 78% were by foreign tourists. The region ranked second in Slovenia in number of tourist beds per 1,000 population, even though it had just over half as many beds as the Coastal–Karst Statistical Region. In 2013, the registered unemployment rate here was the lowest in Slovenia, 3 percentage points lower than the national average and more than 8 percentage points lower than in the Mura Statistical Region, where the registered unemployment rate was the highest. Although agriculture in this region is not among the most important activities, the farms are among the largest in the country both in terms of average utilised agricultural area per farm and in terms of the number of livestock per farm.

At the beginning of 2013, this region had a relatively favourable educational structure. The share of people without schooling, that had not completed primary school, or with only primary school was below the national average, and the share of people with tertiary education was above the national average. In this region, municipal waste is carefully separated; in 2013 more than half of municipal waste was collected separately.

== Cities and towns ==
The Upper Carniola Statistical Region includes 8 cities and towns, the largest of which is Kranj.

Rank	Name	Population (2021)
1.	Kranj	38,024
2.	Jesenice	13,503
3.	Škofja Loka	11,706
4.	Radovljica	6,133
5.	Bled	5,181
6.	Tržič	3,744
7.	Žiri	3,654
8.	Železniki	2,933

== Municipalities ==
The Upper Carniola Statistical Region comprises the following 18 municipalities:

- Bled
- Bohinj
- Cerklje na Gorenjskem
- Gorenja Vas–Poljane
- Gorje
- Jesenice
- Jezersko
- Kranj
- Kranjska Gora
- Naklo
- Preddvor
- Radovljica
- Šenčur
- Škofja Loka
- Tržič
- Železniki
- Žiri
- Žirovnica

== Demographics ==
The estimated population in 2020 was 206,621. It has a total area of 2,137 km^{2}.

== Economy ==
Employment structure: 58.9% services, 39% industry, 2.1% agriculture.

=== Tourism ===
It is the second most popular tourist destination of all the regions (20%), the tourists being from: 20% Slovenia, 3.7% Austria, 4.6% Croatia, 8.5% Italy, 10% Germany, 4.3% UK, 49% other countries.

== Transportation ==
- Length of motorways: 73.2 km (45.5 mi)
- Length of other roads: 3,127.4 km (1,943.3 mi); also railways.

Slovenia's main international airport is also in the region.

== Sources ==
- Slovenian regions in figures 2014 (in Slovene)
