= List of cities, towns, and villages in Slovenia: Ž =

This is a list of cities, towns, and villages in Slovenia, starting with Ž.

Settlement	Municipality
Žabče	Tolmin
Žabja vas	Gorenja vas-Poljane
Žabjek v Podbočju	Krško
Žabjek	Trebnje
Žablje	Kranj
Žabljek	Slovenska Bistrica
Žabnica	Brezovica
Žabnica	Kranj
Žadovinek	Krško
Žaga	Bovec
Žaga	Kamnik
Žaga	Velike Lašče
Žagolič	Ajdovščina
Žahenberc	Rogatec
Žalec	Žalec
Žalna	Grosuplje
Žaloviče	Novo mesto
Žamenci	Dornava
Žapuže	Ajdovščina
Žažar	Horjul
Ždinja vas	Novo mesto
Žebnik	Radeče
Žegar	Šentjur
Žeje pri Komendi	Komenda
Žeje	Domžale
Žeje	Naklo
Žeje	Postojna
Žejno	Brežice
Želče	Vojnik
Želebej	Metlika
Železne Dveri	Ljutomer
Železnica	Grosuplje
Železniki	Metlika
Železniki	Železniki
Železno	Trebnje
Železno	Žalec
Želimlje	Škofljica
Željne	Kočevje
Želodnik	Domžale
Ženavlje	Gornji Petrovci
Ženik	Sveti Jurij
Ženjak	Benedikt
Ženje	Krško
Žepina	Celje
Žepovci	Gornja Radgona
Žerjav	Črna na Koroškem
Žerjavin	Šentjernej
Žerjavka	Šenčur
Žerovinci	Ormož
Žerovnica	Cerknica
Žetale	Žetale
Žiberci	Gornja Radgona
Žibrše	Logatec
Žice	Sveta Ana
Žiče	Domžale
Žiče	Slovenske Konjice
Žiganja vas	Tržič
Žigon	Laško
Žigrski Vrh	Sevnica
Žihlava	Sveti Jurij
Žihovo Selo	Novo mesto
Žikarce	Duplek
Žimarice	Sodražica
Žiri	Žiri
Žirje	Sežana
Žirovnica	Idrija
Žirovnica	Sevnica
Žirovnica	Žirovnica
Žirovski Vrh Svetega Antona	Gorenja vas-Poljane
Žirovski Vrh Svetega Urbana	Gorenja vas-Poljane
Žirovski Vrh	Žiri
Žirovše	Lukovica
Žitence	Lenart
Žitkovci	Dobrovnik
Žižki	Črenšovci
Žlabor	Nazarje
Žlan	Bohinj
Žlebe	Medvode
Žlebič	Ribnica
Žrnova	Radenci
Žubejevo	Kamnik
Žubina	Trebnje
Žukovo	Ribnica
Žuniči	Črnomelj
Župa	Trbovlje
Župančiči	Koper
Županje Njive	Kamnik
Župeča vas	Brežice
Župečja vas	Kidričevo
Župelevec	Brežice
Župeno	Cerknica
Župetinci	Cerkvenjak
Žurge	Osilnica
Žurkov Dol	Sevnica
Žužemberk	Žužemberk
Žvab	Ormož
Žvabovo	Šentjernej
Žvarulje	Zagorje ob Savi
Žvirče	Žužemberk
