= Žirovski Vrh =

Žirovski Vrh may refer to the following places in Slovenia:

- Žirovski Vrh, Žiri
- Žirovski Vrh Svetega Antona
- Žirovski Vrh Svetega Urbana
- Žirovski Vrh, a former uranium mine in Todraž
