= Zaga =

Zaga or Žaga may refer to:

People

- Alejandra Zaga Mendez (born 1988), Canadian politician
- Henry Zaga (born 1993), Brazilian actor
- Zaga Christ (1616–1638), Ethiopian royal imposter

Places

- Žaga, Bovec, a settlement in the Littoral region of Slovenia
- Žaga, Kamnik, a settlement in the Upper Carniola region of Slovenia
- Žaga, Velike Lašče, a settlement in central Slovenia
