= Železno =

Železno may refer to:

- Eisenstadt, the state capital of Burgenland, Austria, known in Slovene as Železno
- Železno, Trebnje, small settlement northwest of Dobrnič in the Municipality of Trebnje in eastern Slovenia
- Železno, Žalec, small settlement in the Municipality of Žalec in east-central Slovenia
- Żeleźno, village in the administrative district of Gmina Białogard, within Białogard County, West Pomerania
