= Schwortz =

Schwortz is a common surname, derived from the German schwarz, pronounced [ˈʃvaʁts], meaning the color black. It may refer to:

- Eric Schwortz, a musician of band Milagres
- the late Barrie Schwortz, researcher and photographer of the Shroud of Turin Research Project

== See also ==
- Schwörz, the German name for Žvirče, a village in Slovenia
