= Savinjek =

- Location in Slovenia
- Coordinates: 45°51′28″N 15°27′34″E
- Country: Slovenia
- Traditional region: Lower Carniola
- Statistical region: Lower Sava
- Municipality: Krško
- Elevation: 190 m (620 ft)

Savinjek (Slovene pronunciation: [saˈʋiːnjək], also spelled Savinek or Savinjk, and in older sources Zavinek) is a former settlement in the Municipality of Krško in northeastern Slovenia. It is now part of the village of Žabjek v Podbočju. The area is part of the traditional region of Lower Carniola. The municipality is now included in the Lower Sava Statistical Region.

== Geography ==
Savinjek stands southeast of the village center of Žabjek v Podbočju.

== History ==
Savinjek was annexed by Žabjek v Podbočju in 1953, ending its existence as an independent settlement.
