= Seničica =

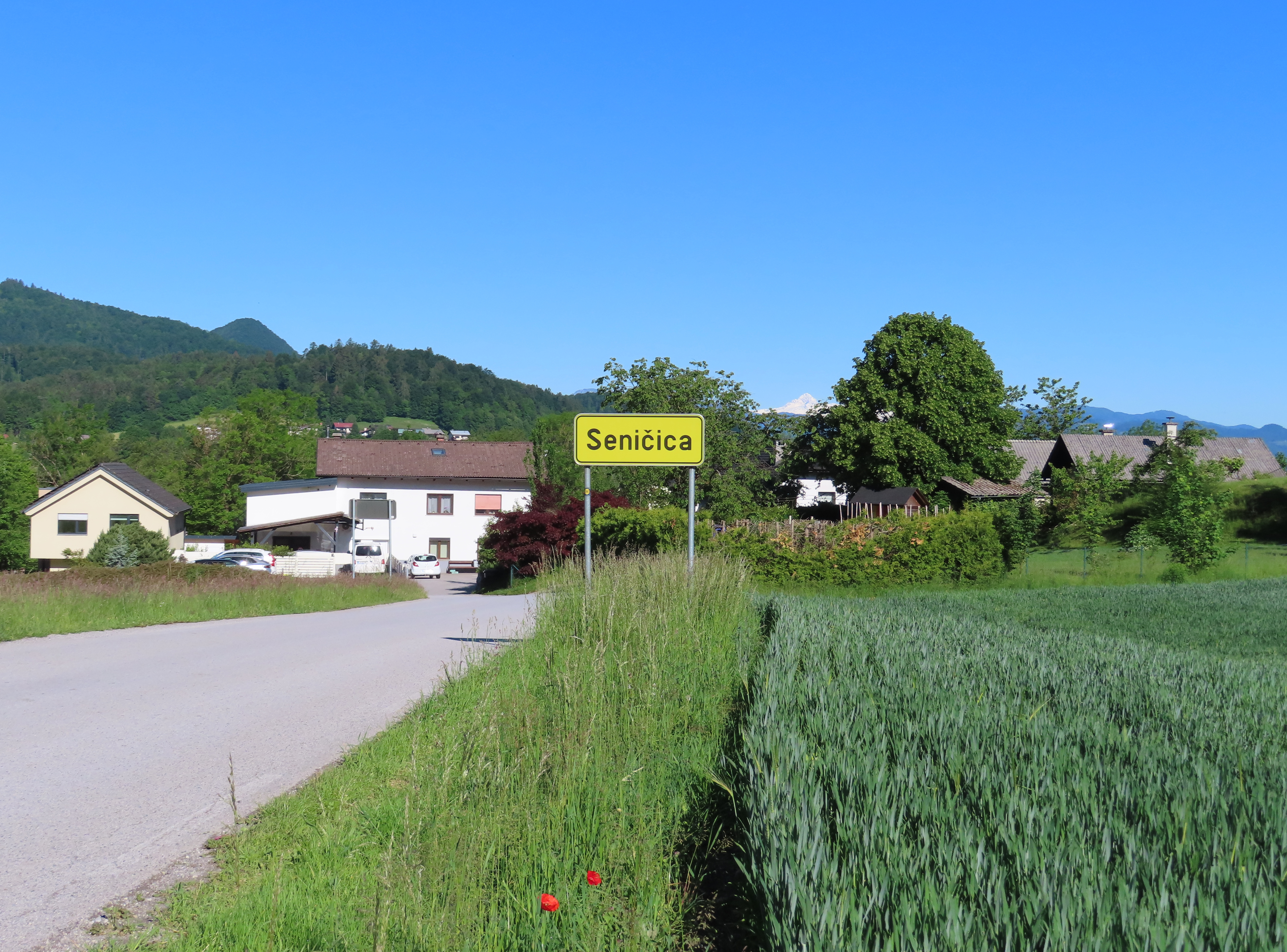

- Location in Slovenia
- Coordinates: 46°7′22.09″N 14°25′20.58″E
- Country: Slovenia
- Traditional region: Upper Carniola
- Statistical region: Central Slovenia
- Municipality: Medvode

Area
  - Total: 1.13 km^{2} (0.44 sq mi)
- Elevation: 334.5 m (1,097 ft)

Population (2002)
  - Total: 212

Seničica (pronounced [sɛˈniːtʃitsa]) is a small village south of Medvode in the Upper Carniola region of Slovenia. The settlement arose alongside Mavelščica Creek (previously called Seničica Creek).

== Name ==
Seničica is also known as Snič(i)ca locally. The name is derived from *sěnьnica 'hay shed' and is related to other Slavic toponyms such as Sjenica, Senice, and Senica.

== History ==
Seničica was ravaged by the plague in 1646, and five people died in a single house there. A guard was set up outside the village, threatening to shoot anyone that tried to leave the infected dwelling. In the early 19th century, the French operated a mine near the village, presumably for coal. Today the excavations and tailings from the mine can still be seen in the woods on the way to Žlebe.

== Cultural heritage ==
There is a stone bridge across Mavelščica Creek, also known a Babniščica Creek. It is a special feature of the municipality because in the past it was part of an important north-south transit route known as the "Ljubelj Road" connecting Salzburg and Aquileia. Because of this special function the bridge was built with special care, with large stones specially fitted to one another. The year 1666 is carved on the bridge. The bridge is occasionally referred to as "Napoleon's Bridge"; although Napoleon likely crossed it, its construction had nothing to do with the movement of French troops because it predates the Napoleonic campaign by a century and a half. Circa 1970 the bridge was registered as Yugoslav cultural heritage with the highest level of protection through the efforts of Marko Mušič. The bridge was renovated in the early 1980s. Today it is part of a protected complex together with a nearby chestnut plantation.

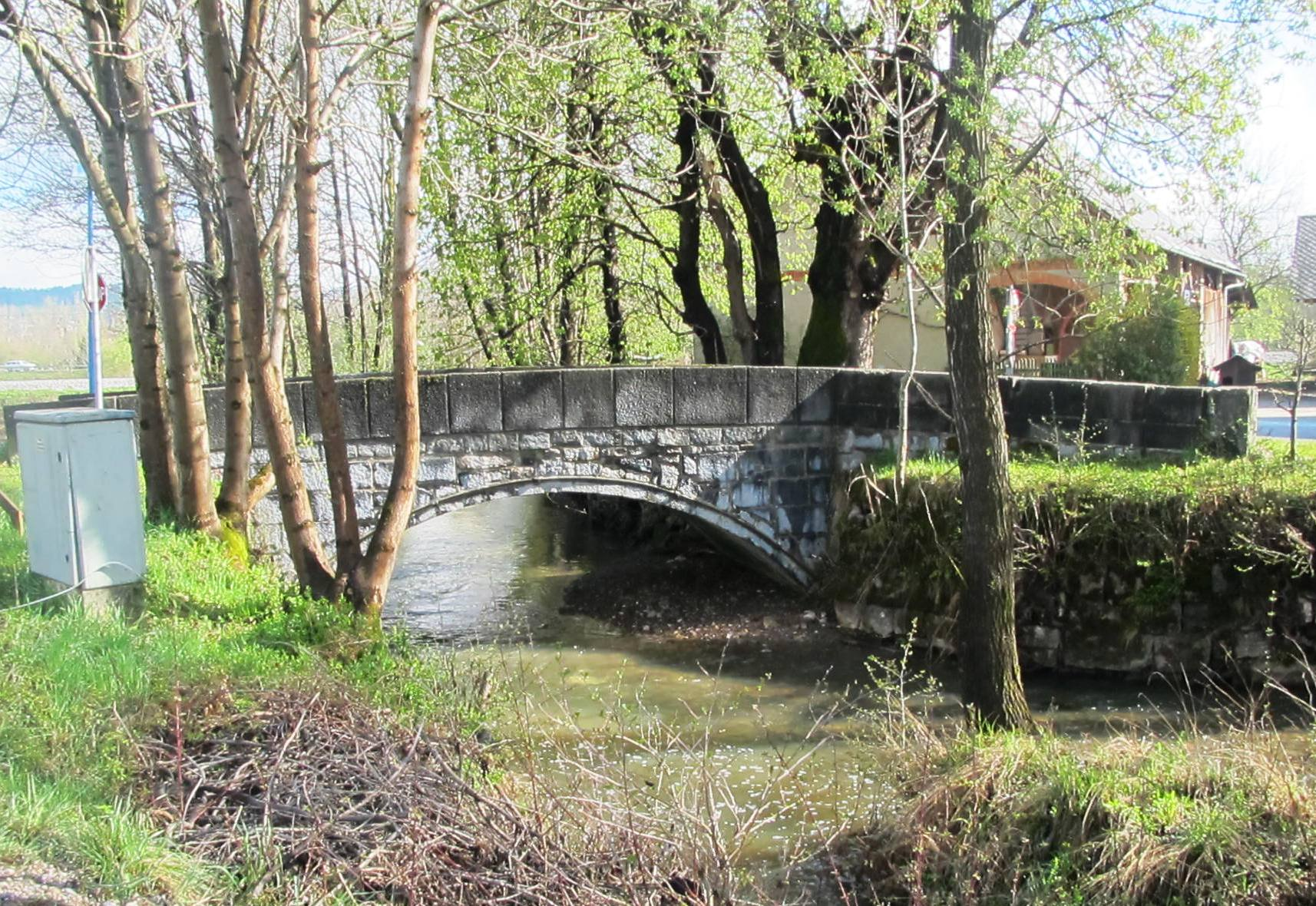
Stone bridge across Mavelščica Creek

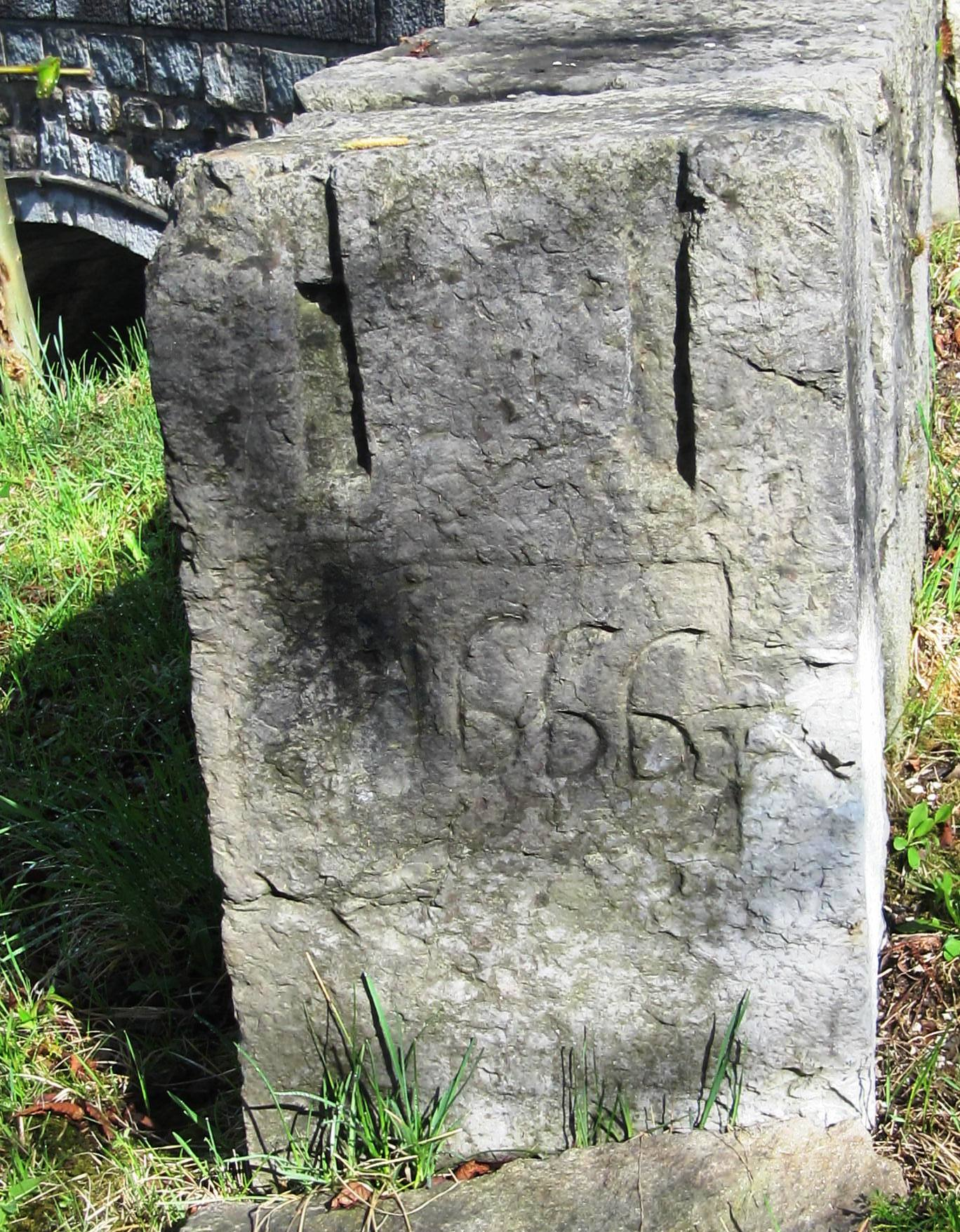
Southeast corner of bridge with the year 1666

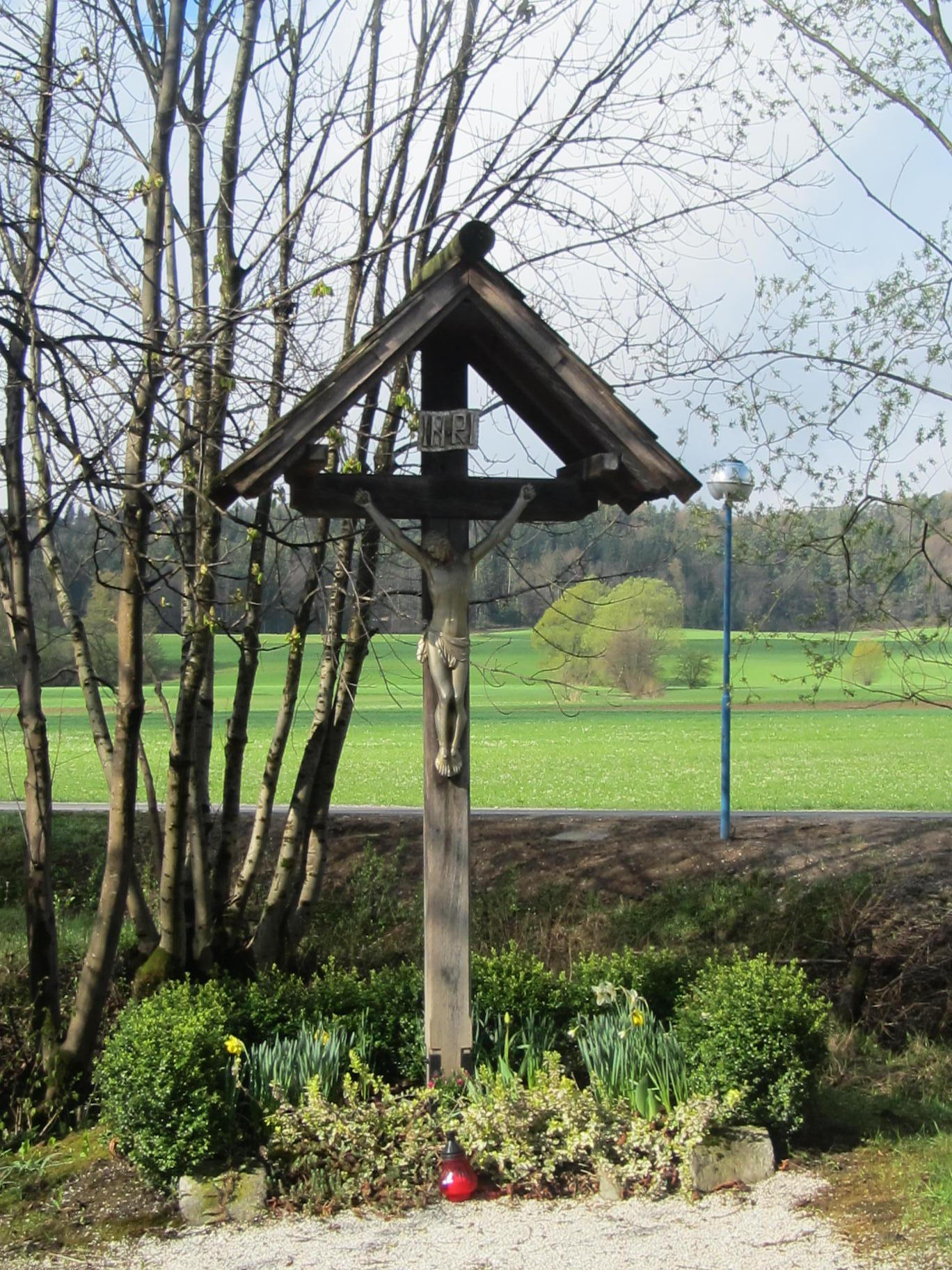
Wayside shrine at Mavelščica Creek
