= Žirovše =

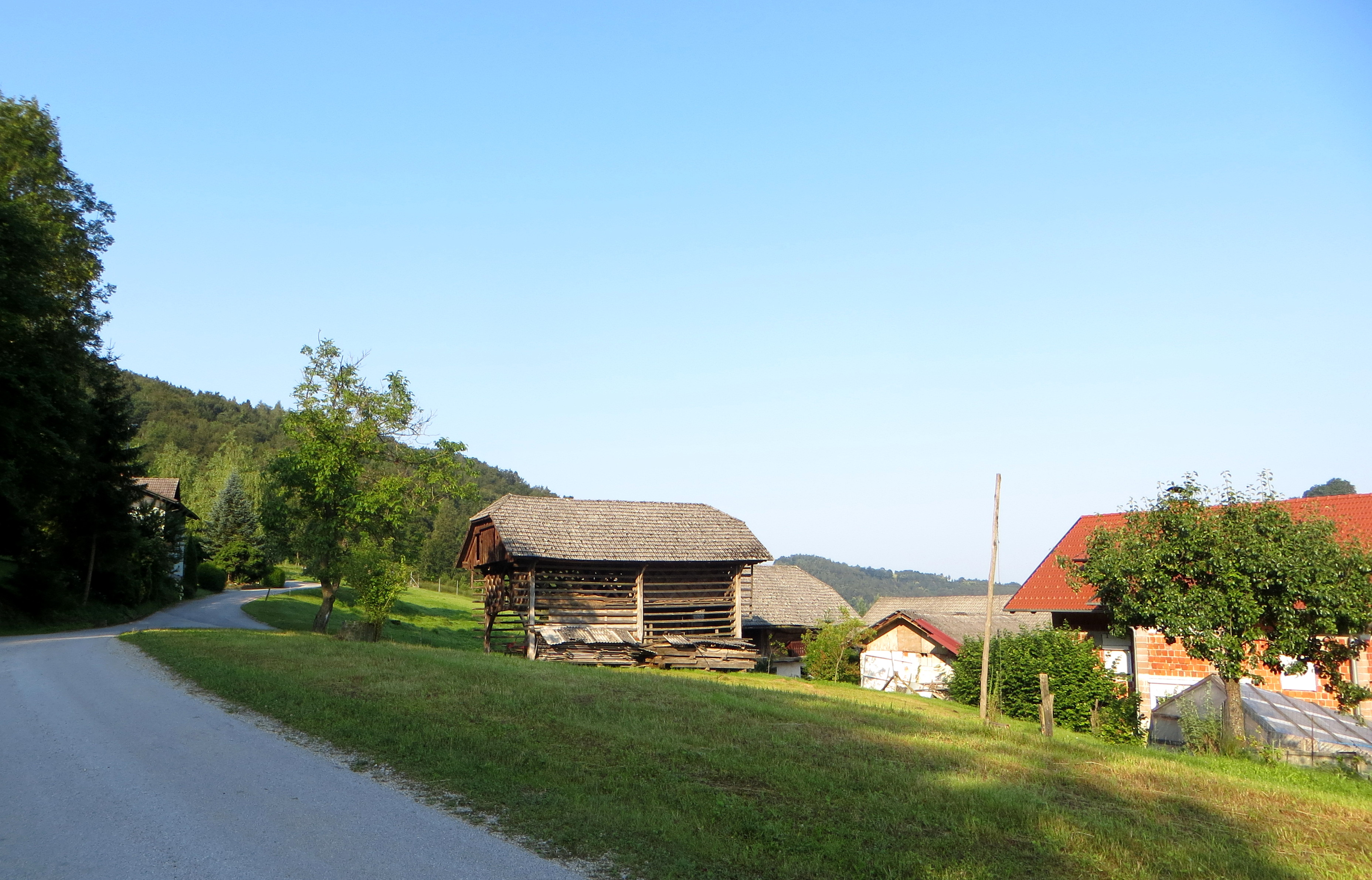

- Location in Slovenia
- Coordinates: 46°10′1″N 14°46′16″E
- Country: Slovenia
- Traditional region: Upper Carniola
- Statistical region: Central Slovenia
- Municipality: Lukovica

Area
  - Total: 0.28 km^{2} (0.11 sq mi)
- Elevation: 394.7 m (1,295 ft)

Population (2002)
  - Total: 25

Žirovše (pronounced [ˈʒiːɾɔu̯ʃɛ]; in older sources also Sirovše, German: Sirousche or Sirousch) is a small settlement east of Krašnja in the Municipality of Lukovica in the southeastern part of the Upper Carniola region of Slovenia.
