= Žirovski Vrh, Žiri =

Žirovski Vrh
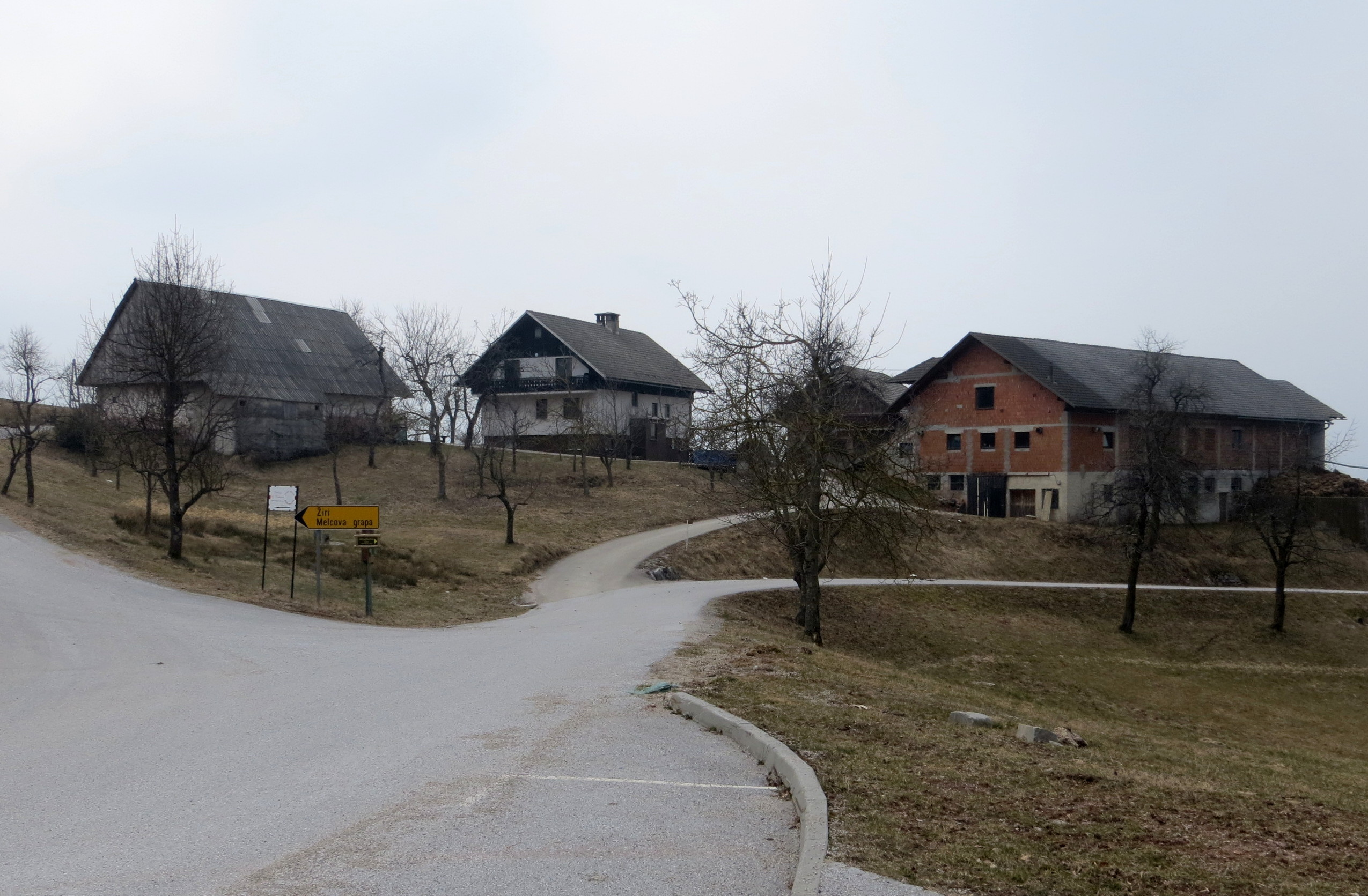
- The hamlet of Bukovec in Žirovski Vrh

- Location in Slovenia
- Coordinates: 46°4′14.28″N 14°7′35.41″E
- Country: Slovenia
- Traditional region: Upper Carniola
- Statistical region: Upper Carniola
- Municipality: Žiri

Area
  - Total: 10.98 km^{2} (4.24 sq mi)
- Elevation: 714.4 m (2,344 ft)

Population (2002)
  - Total: 240

Žirovski Vrh (pronounced [ʒiˈɾoːu̯ski ˈʋəɾx], German: Sairachberg) is a dispersed settlement in the hills east of Žiri in the Upper Carniola region of Slovenia. It is made up of isolated farmsteads and small hamlets on the southeastern slopes of a range called Žiri Peak (Slovene: Žirovski vrh). The dispersed nature of the settlement on the hill continues into the neighbouring Municipality of Gorenja Vas–Poljane with the settlements of Žirovski Vrh Svetega Antona and Žirovski Vrh Svetega Urbana on its northern slopes.
