= Krašnja =

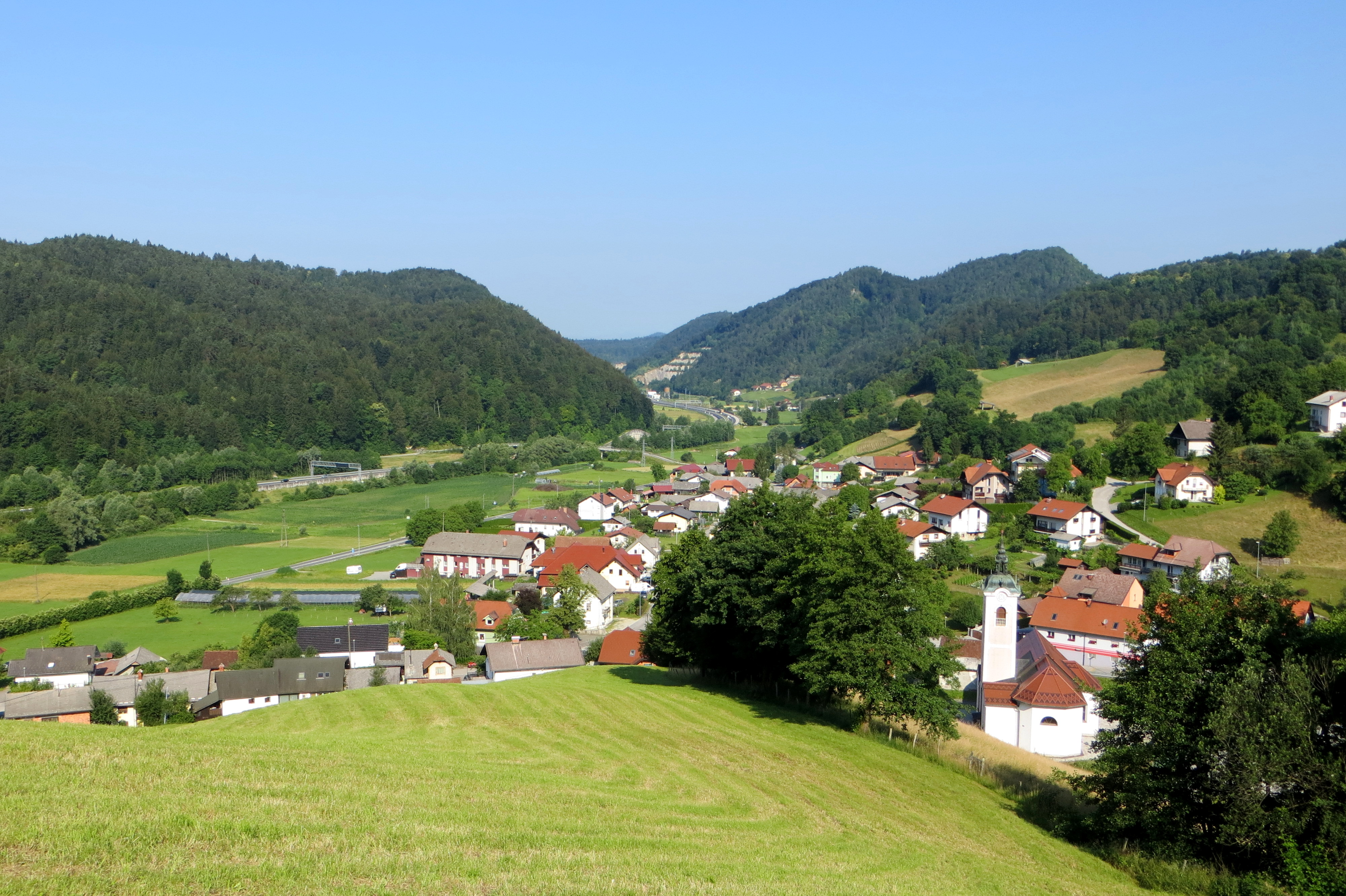

- Location in Slovenia
- Coordinates: 46°10′8.93″N 14°44′50.89″E
- Country: Slovenia
- Traditional region: Upper Carniola
- Statistical region: Central Slovenia
- Municipality: Lukovica

Area
  - Total: 2.65 km^{2} (1.02 sq mi)
- Elevation: 398.6 m (1,308 ft)

Population (2002)
  - Total: 328

Krašnja (pronounced [ˈkɾaːʃnja]; German: Kraxen) is a village in the Municipality of Lukovica in the eastern part of the Upper Carniola region of Slovenia.

== Church ==
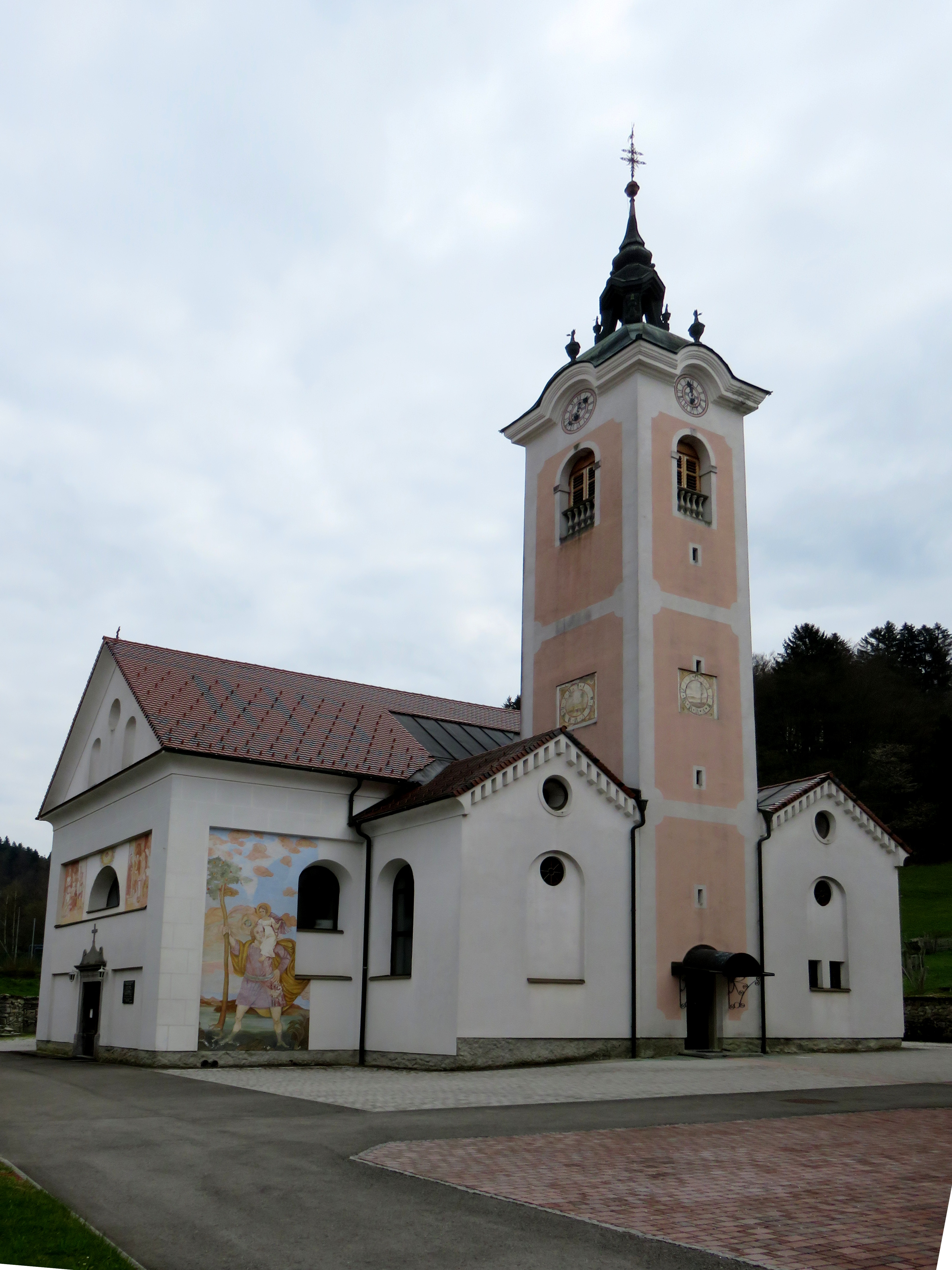
Saint Thomas's Church

The parish church in the settlement is dedicated to Saint Thomas.
