= Žadovinek =

Place in Lower Carniola, Slovenia

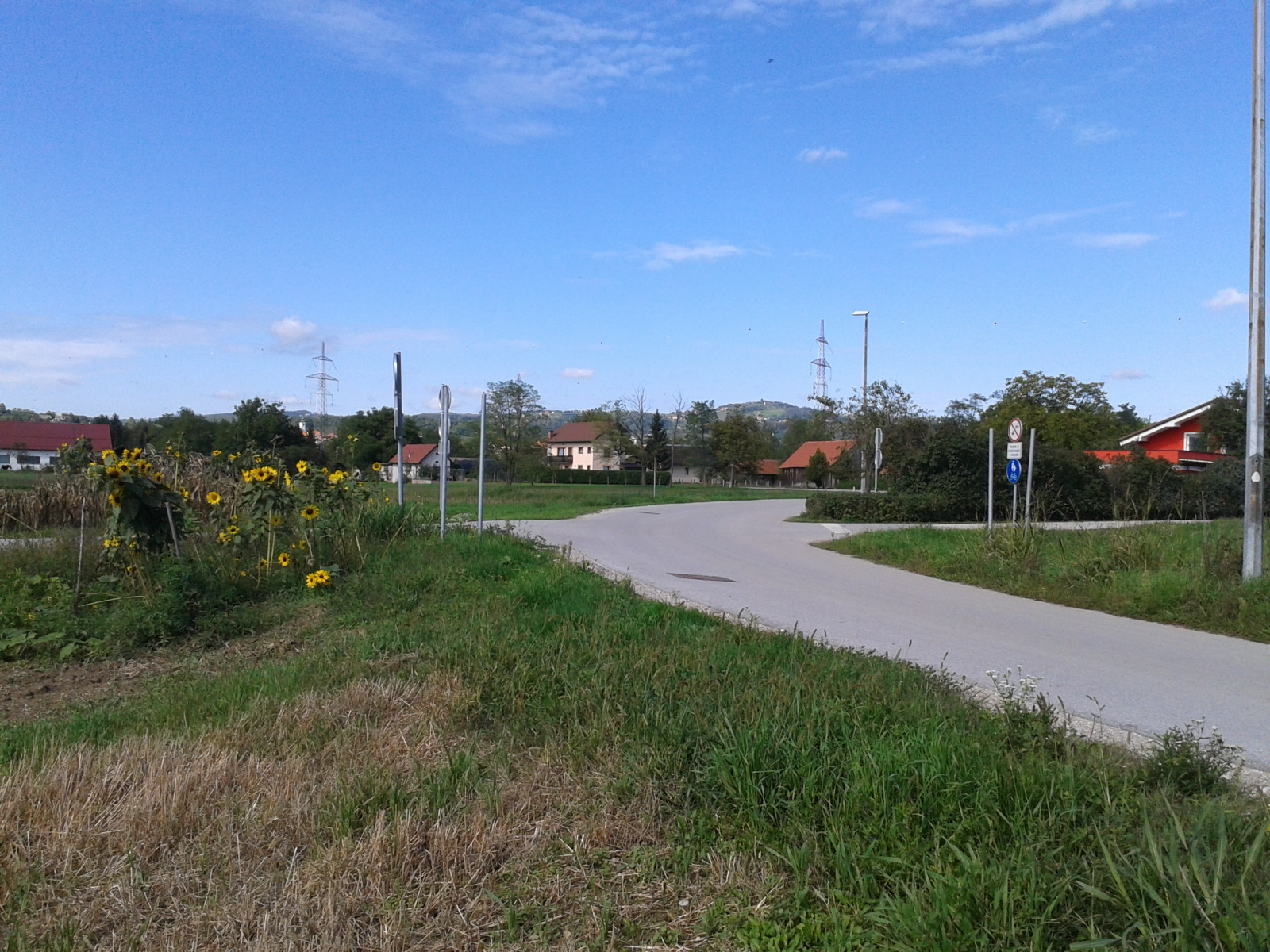

- Location in Slovenia
- Coordinates: 45°56′2.89″N 15°29′39.86″E
- Country: Slovenia
- Traditional region: Lower Carniola
- Statistical region: Lower Sava
- Municipality: Krško

Area
  - Total: 3.17 km^{2} (1.22 sq mi)
- Elevation: 155.9 m (511 ft)

Population (2002)
  - Total: 82

Žadovinek (pronounced [ʒadɔˈʋiːnək]; in older sources also Zadovinek) is a settlement on the right bank of the Sava River, east of Leskovec in the Municipality of Krško in eastern Slovenia. The area is part of the traditional region of Lower Carniola. It is now included with the rest of the municipality in the Lower Sava Statistical Region.

== History ==
In the late fall of 1941, German forces evicted the residents of the village in order to make way for the resettlement of Gottschee Germans. In 1964 the northern part of Žadovinek, known as Petrovce, was annexed by the town of Krško. The remaining part, known as Srednji Marof (German: Mittermaierhof) remained separate as the village of Žadovinek.

== Cultural heritage ==
Late Bronze Age, Early Iron Age, and Roman graves have been found in the Petrovce area of the settlement.
