= Železnica, Grosuplje =

Železnica
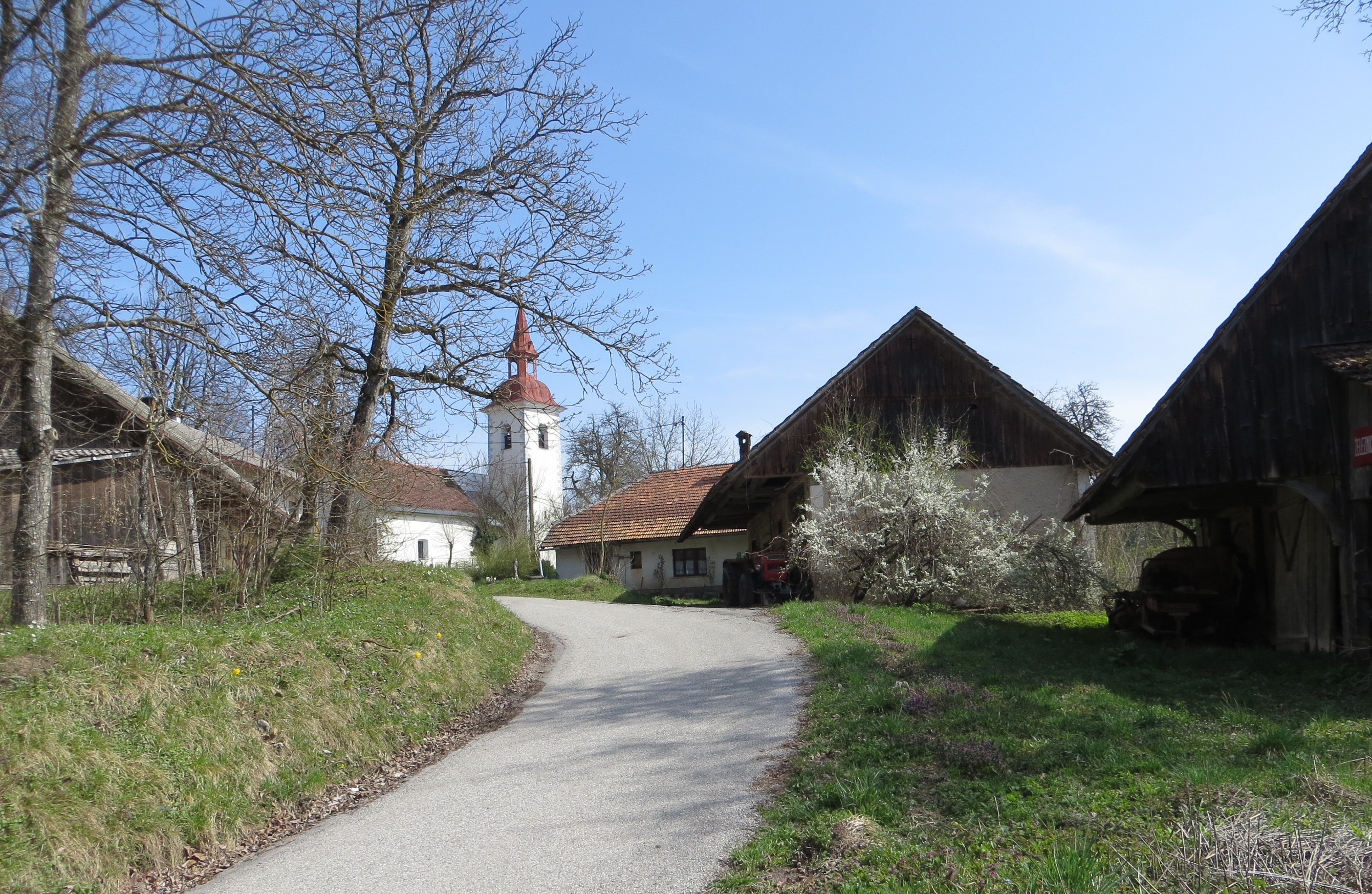

- Location in Slovenia
- Coordinates: 45°53′37.3″N 14°38′6.2″E
- Country: Slovenia
- Traditional region: Lower Carniola
- Statistical region: Central Slovenia
- Municipality: Grosuplje

Area
  - Total: 0.46 km^{2} (0.18 sq mi)
- Elevation: 508.3 m (1,668 ft)

Population (2002)
  - Total: 12

Železnica (pronounced [ʒɛˈleːznitsa]; German: Eisenhof) is a small village in the Municipality of Grosuplje in central Slovenia. It lies in the hills south of Grosuplje in the historical region of Lower Carniola. The municipality is now included in the Central Slovenia Statistical Region.

== Church ==
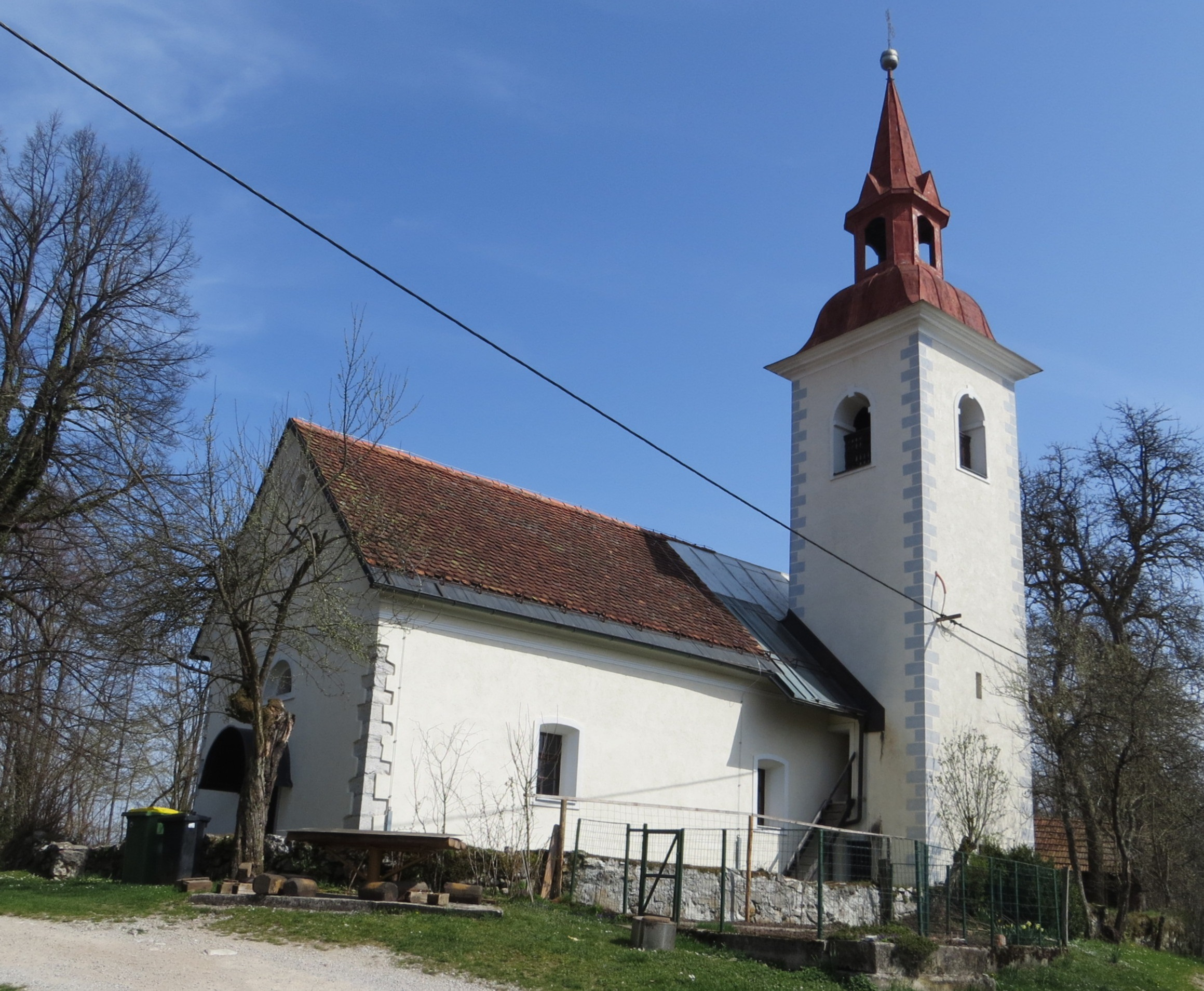
Assumption Church

The local church is dedicated to the Assumption of Mary and belongs to the Parish of Škocjan pri Turjaku. In its core it is a 15th-century Gothic building that was restyled in the Baroque in the mid-18th and 19th centuries.
