= Žvarulje =

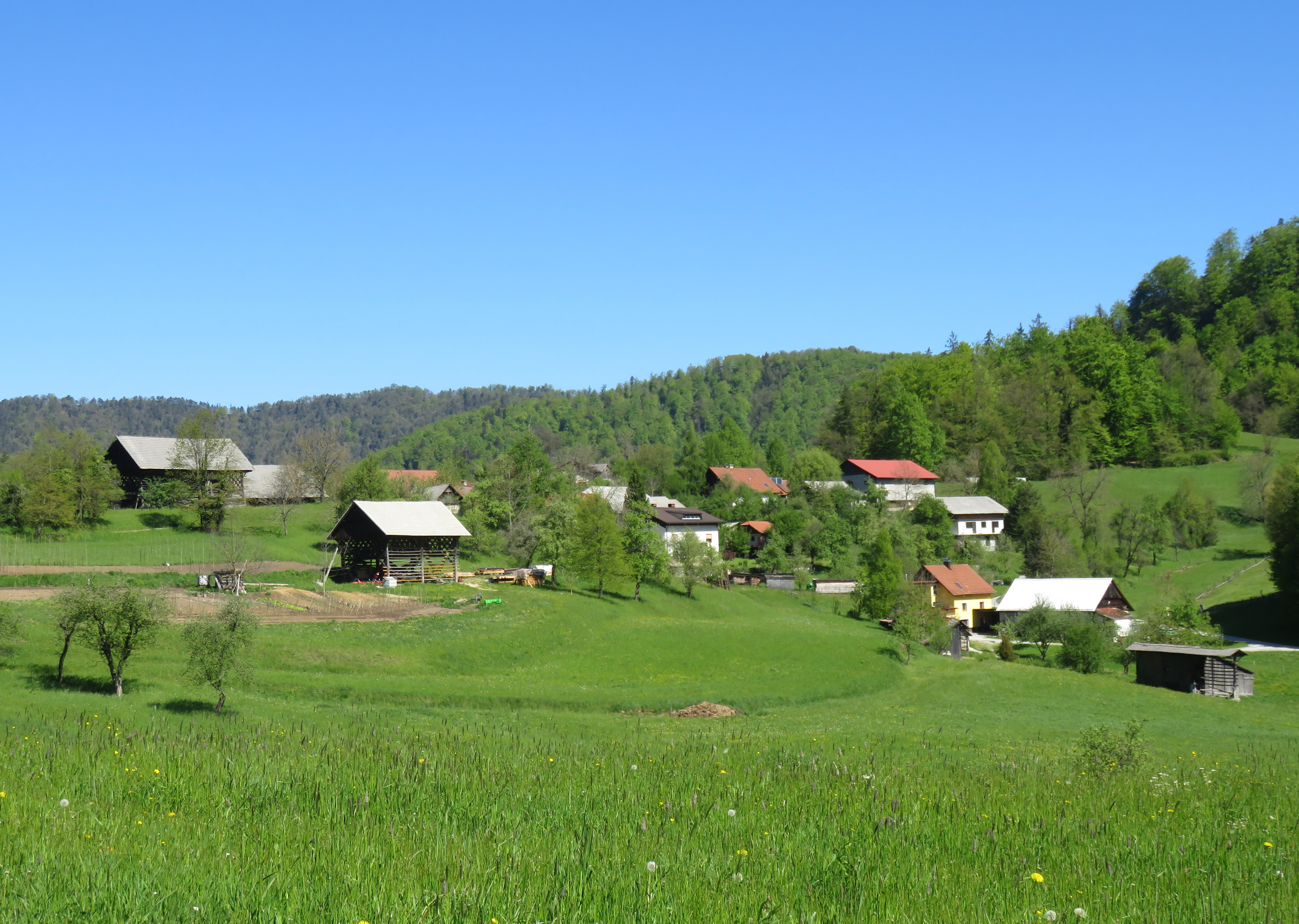

- Location in Slovenia
- Coordinates: 46°9′0.96″N 14°51′49.71″E
- Country: Slovenia
- Traditional region: Upper Carniola
- Statistical region: Central Sava
- Municipality: Zagorje ob Savi

Area
  - Total: 3.12 km^{2} (1.20 sq mi)
- Elevation: 497.5 m (1,632 ft)

Population (2002)
  - Total: 75
- Postal code: 1411

Žvarulje (pronounced [ˈʒʋaːɾuljɛ] or [ʒʋaˈɾuːljɛ], in older sources also Žvarovlje or Žvarule, German: Schwarule) is a settlement west of Izlake in the Municipality of Zagorje ob Savi in central Slovenia. The area is part of the traditional region of Upper Carniola. It is now included with the rest of the municipality in the Central Sava Statistical Region.

== Geography ==
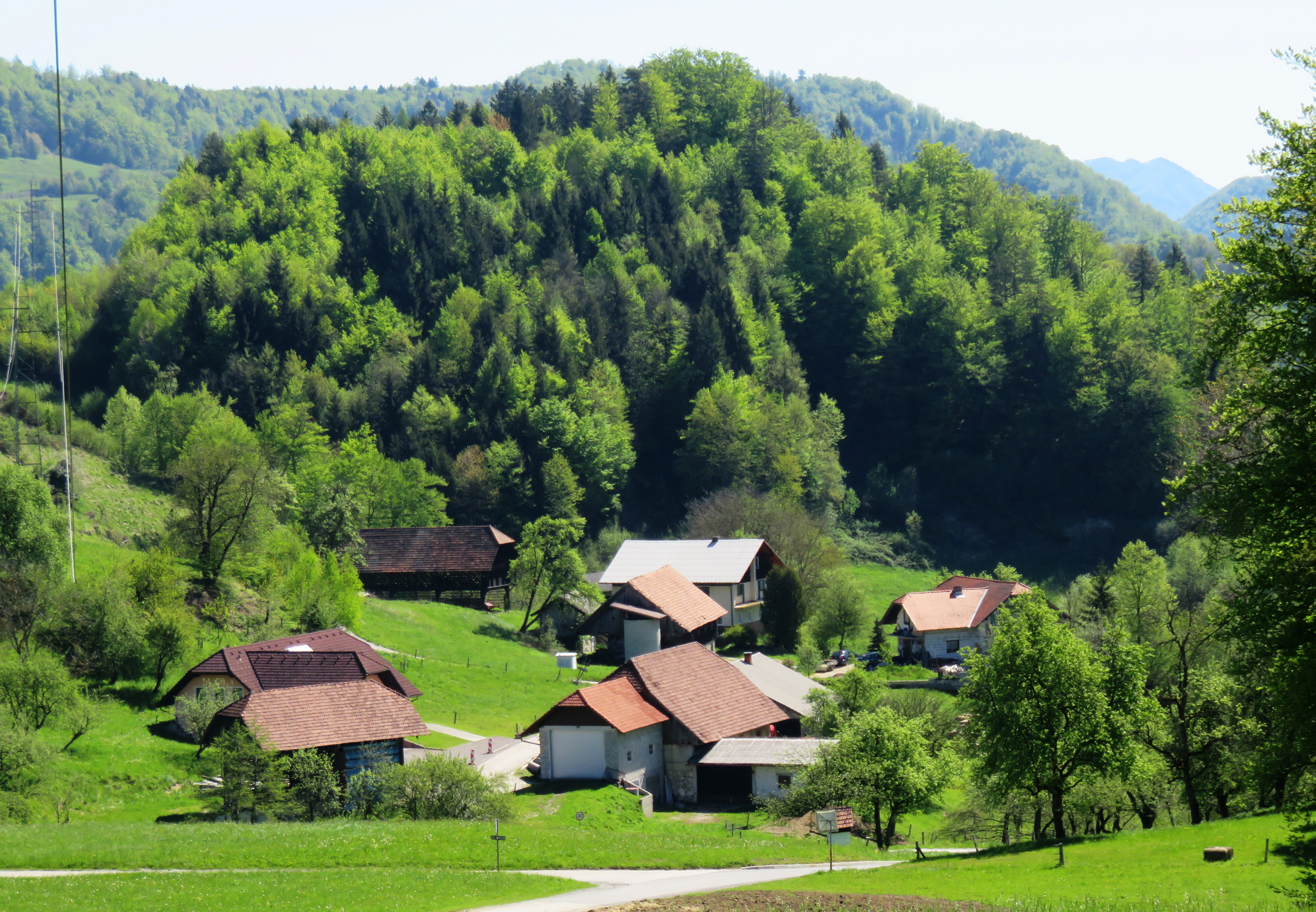
The hamlet of Zlokarje

Žvarulje includes the hamlets of Hmeljno to the northwest of the village center and Zlokarje to the southeast, along the road to Dolgo Brdo pri Mlinšah.

== History ==
The hamlet of Zlokarje had a population of 17 in 1931, and a population of 12 (in two houses) in 1953.

== Church ==
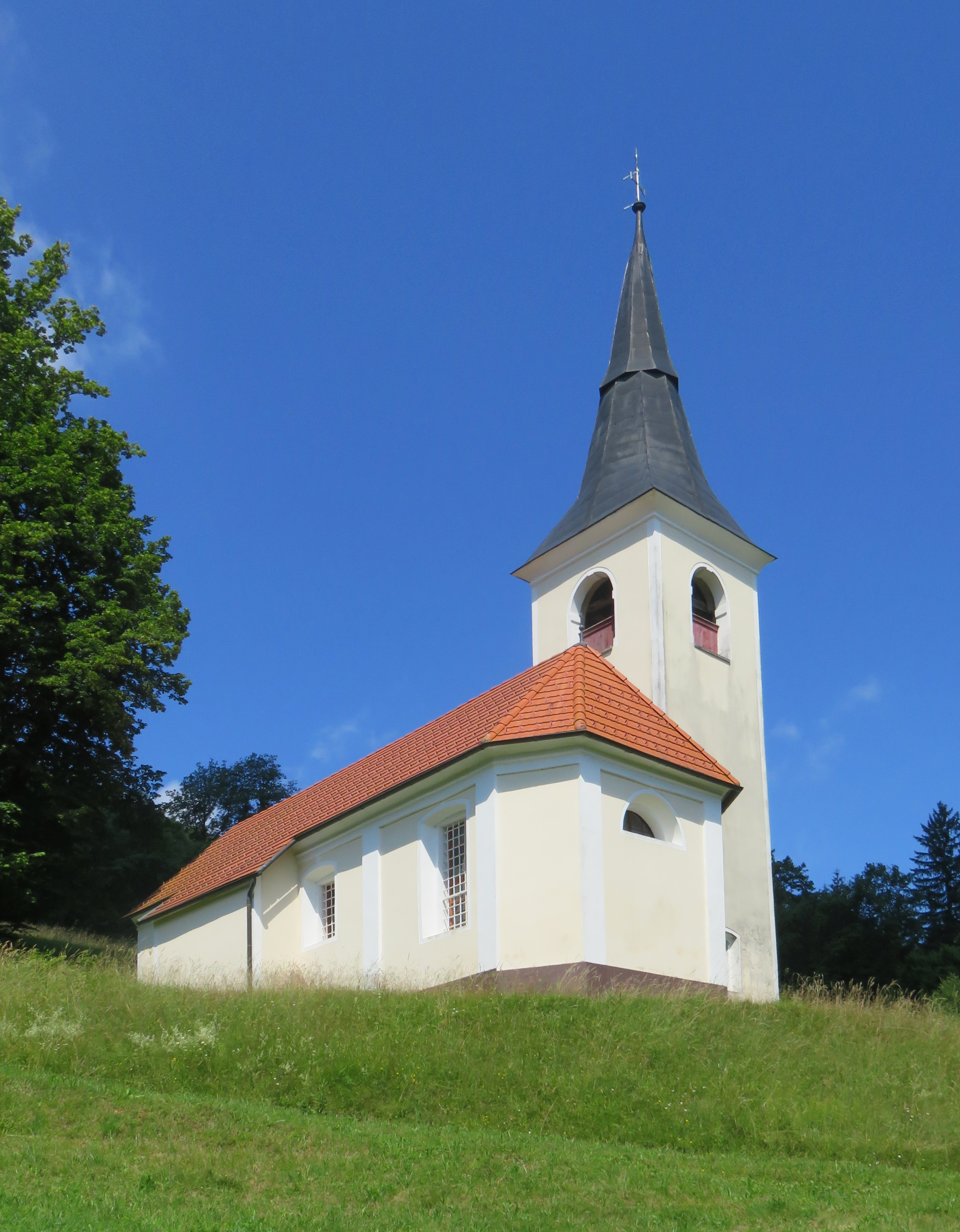
Saint Gregory's Church

The local church is dedicated to Saint Gregory and belongs to the Parish of Kolovrat. It dates to the 18th century.
