= Žuniči =

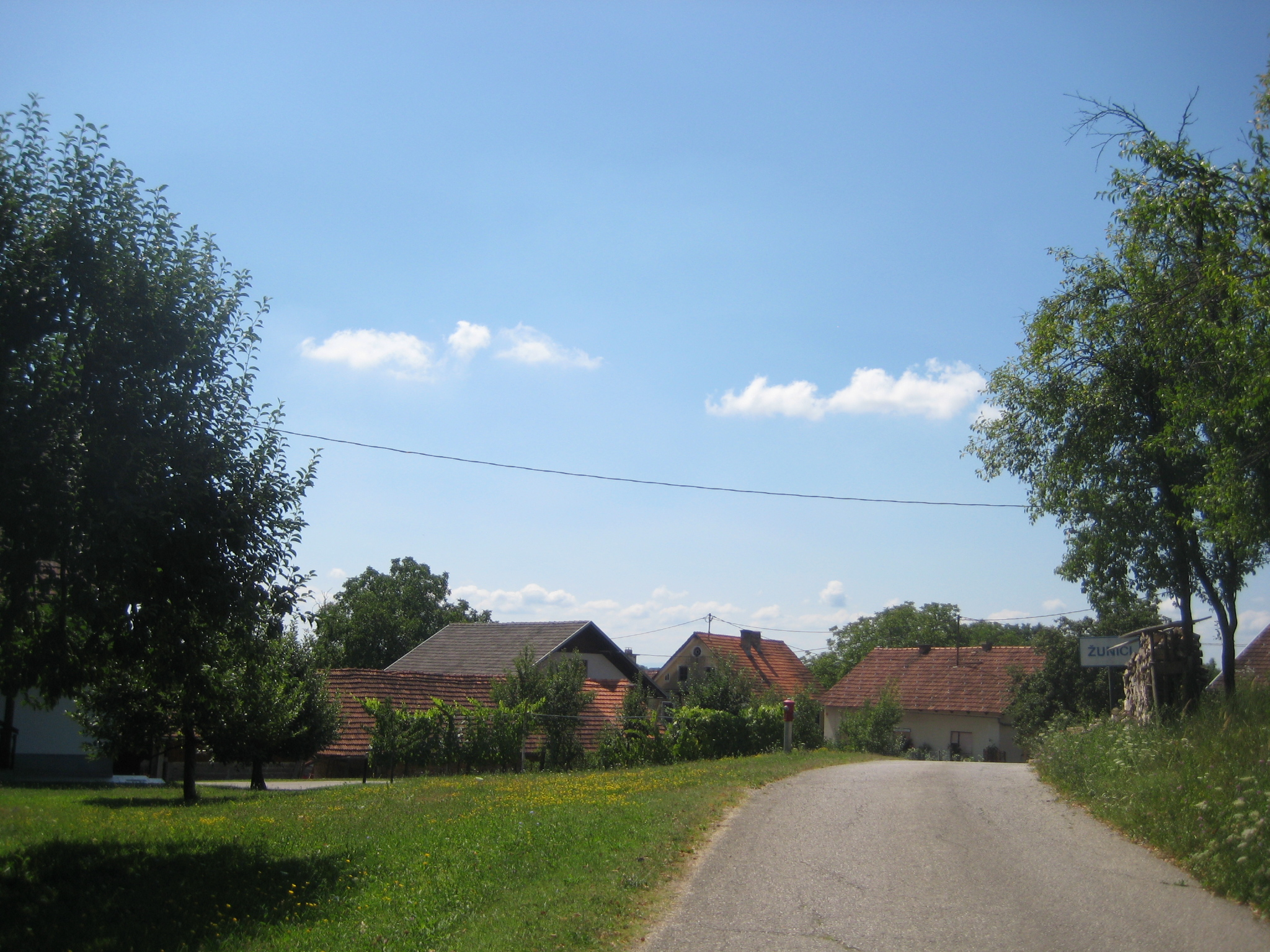
- Interactive map of Žuniči
- Location in Slovenia
- Coordinates: 45°28′55.3″N 15°21′38.55″E
- Country: Slovenia
- Traditional region: White Carniola
- Statistical region: Southeast Slovenia
- Municipality: Črnomelj

Area
  - Total: 1.55 km^{2} (0.60 sq mi)
- Elevation: 195.6 m (642 ft)

Population (2020)
  - Total: 43
  - Density: 28/km^{2} (72/sq mi)
- Postal code: 8341
- Climate: Cfb

Žuniči (pronounced [ˈʒuːnitʃi]; in older sources also Žuniče, German: Schunitsche) is a settlement on the left bank of the Kolpa River in the Municipality of Črnomelj in the White Carniola area of southeastern Slovenia. The area is part of the traditional region of Lower Carniola and is now included in the Southeast Slovenia Statistical Region.

A small chapel in the settlement is dedicated to Saint Nicholas (Slovene: sveti Miklavž) and belongs to the Parish of Preloka. It was built in the early 20th century.
