= Senice =

- Municipality
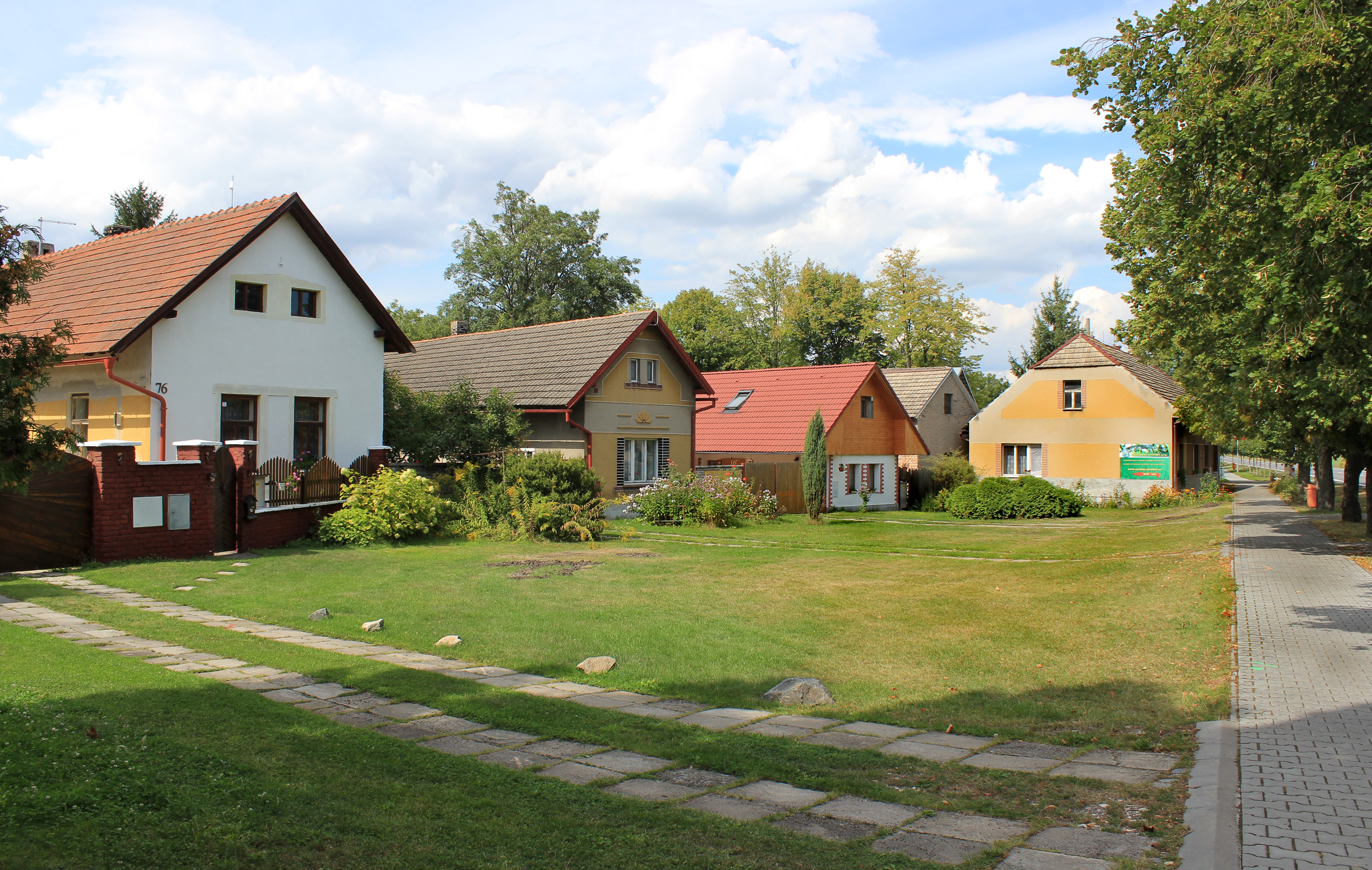
- Western part of Senice

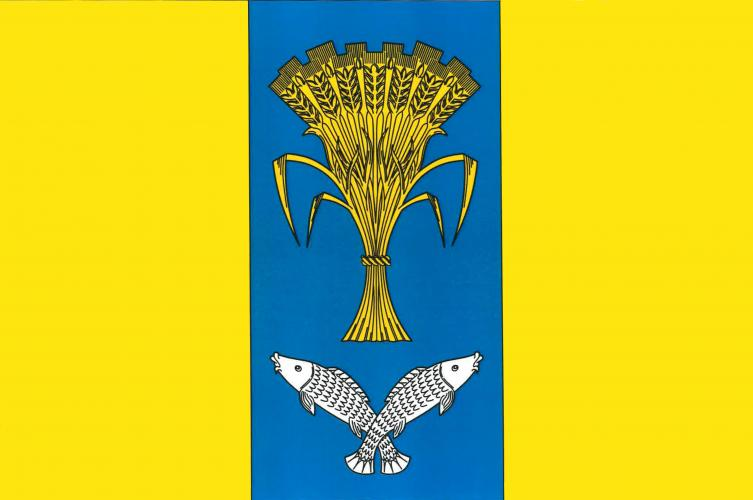
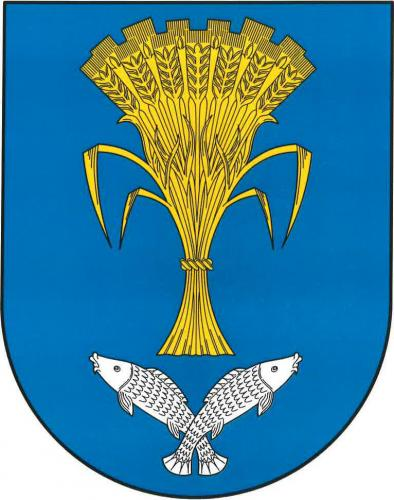
- Flag Coat of arms

- Location in the Czech Republic
- Coordinates: 50°11′3″N 15°12′28″E
- Country: Czech Republic
- Region: Central Bohemian
- District: Nymburk
- First mentioned: 1383

Area
  - Total: 4.47 km^{2} (1.73 sq mi)
- Elevation: 195 m (640 ft)

Population (2026-01-01)
  - Total: 203
  - Density: 45.4/km^{2} (118/sq mi)
- Time zone: UTC+1 (CET)
  - Summer (DST): UTC+2 (CEST)
- Postal code: 290 01
- Website: www.senice.cz

Senice is a municipality and village in Nymburk District in the Central Bohemian Region of the Czech Republic. It has about 200 inhabitants.

== Demographics ==
Historical population
Year	Pop.	±%
1869	229	—
1880	289	+26.2%
1890	296	+2.4%
1900	312	+5.4%
1910	309	−1.0%
1921	362	+17.2%
1930	356	−1.7%
1950	278	−21.9%
1961	265	−4.7%
1970	226	−14.7%
1980	214	−5.3%
1991	184	−14.0%
2001	175	−4.9%
2011	175	+0.0%
2021	202	+15.4%
Source: Censuses
