= Žlebe =

Žlebe Sveta Marjeta (local name)
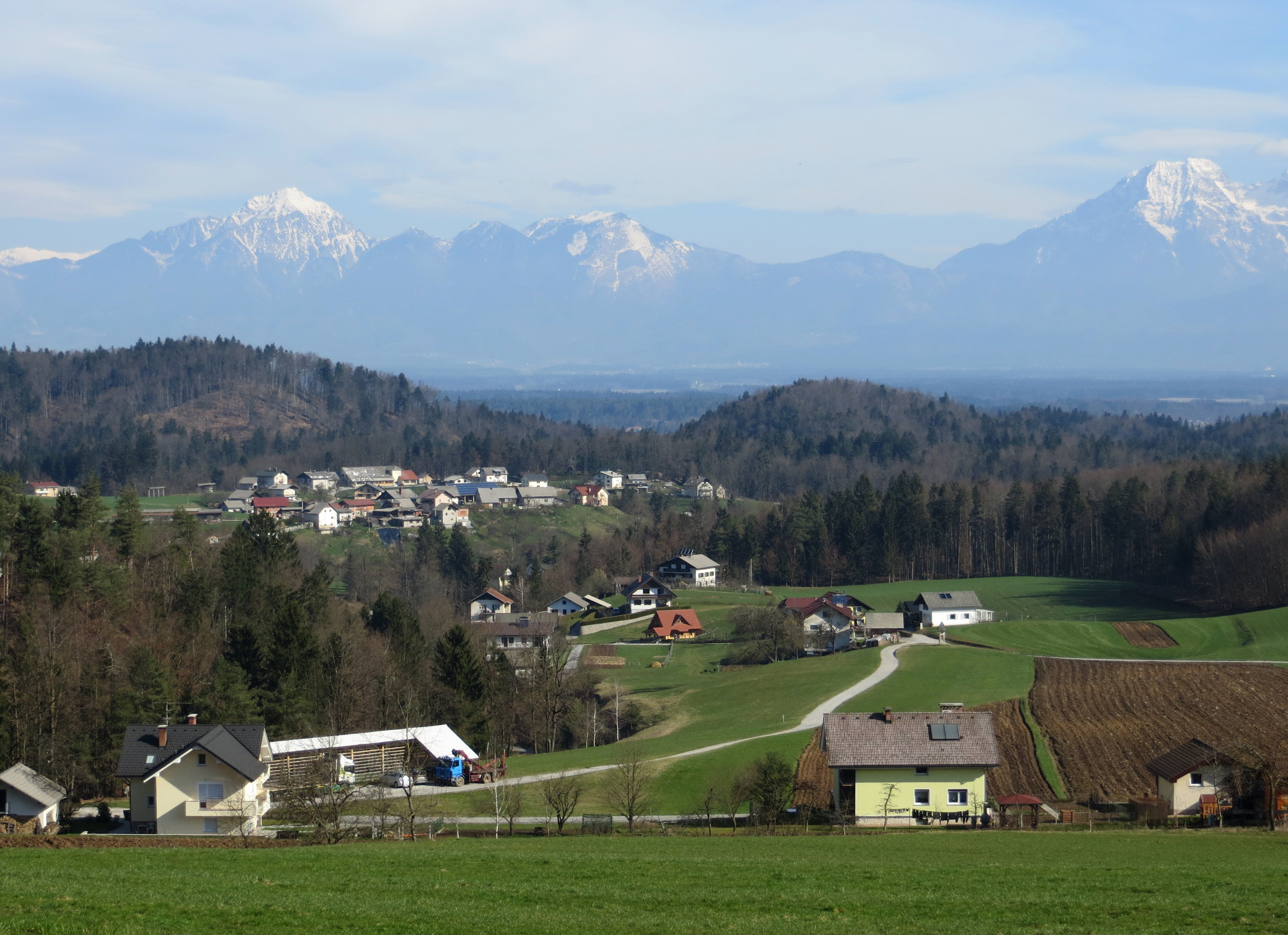

- Location in Slovenia
- Coordinates: 46°7′14.13″N 14°23′41.45″E
- Country: Slovenia
- Traditional region: Upper Carniola
- Statistical region: Central Slovenia
- Municipality: Medvode

Area
  - Total: 5.67 km^{2} (2.19 sq mi)
- Elevation: 381.2 m (1,251 ft)

Population (2002)
  - Total: 470

Žlebe (pronounced [ˈʒleːbɛ] or [ʒlɛˈbeː]; locally also Sveta Marjeta, German: Schlebe) is a dispersed settlement in the Municipality of Medvode in the Upper Carniola region of Slovenia.

== Geography ==
Žlebe lies in the Polhov Gradec Hills south of Medvode. It is a sprawling settlement, encompassing several dispersed hamlets and farms: Cajnar, Gmajnar, Jakob, Kršlje, Malenšek, Petelinc, Potočnik, Pri Kajžah, Pristava, Ravniški Grič (or Hrušica), Stežica (or Stešca), and Završe. In the narrow sense (as a hamlet), Žlebe refers only to the area at the highest part of the valley. The settlement spreads across Tertiary hills and low slopes of dolomite hills separated by ravines with creeks. Zakonjščica Creek is the main watercourse, with its source below Jetrbenk Hill (774 meters or 2,539 feet), and it empties into Mavelščica Creek at Seničica. Tributaries of Zakonjščica Creek include Potočnica Creek (with its source at the Potočnik farm) and Učak Creek (with its source at the Učak farm).

== Name ==
Zlebe was attested in written sources in 1427 as Slepach. The name is derived from the Slovene common noun žleb 'gorge, ravine', referring to the local geography. In the past, the settlement was known as Schlebe in German. Locally, the settlement is also known as Sveta Marjeta.

== Fortifications ==
A fortification formerly stood on Jetrbenk Hill in the southwest part of the settlement. It was owned by the Hertenberg robber knights, who were non-free nobles subservient to the Spanheims, and later to the Patriarchate of Aquileia. The fortification was probably destroyed by the 1511 Idrija earthquake and little trace of it remains today. Gradišče Hill, which stands below Jetrbenk Hill, was the site of a fortification in antiquity.

== Churches ==
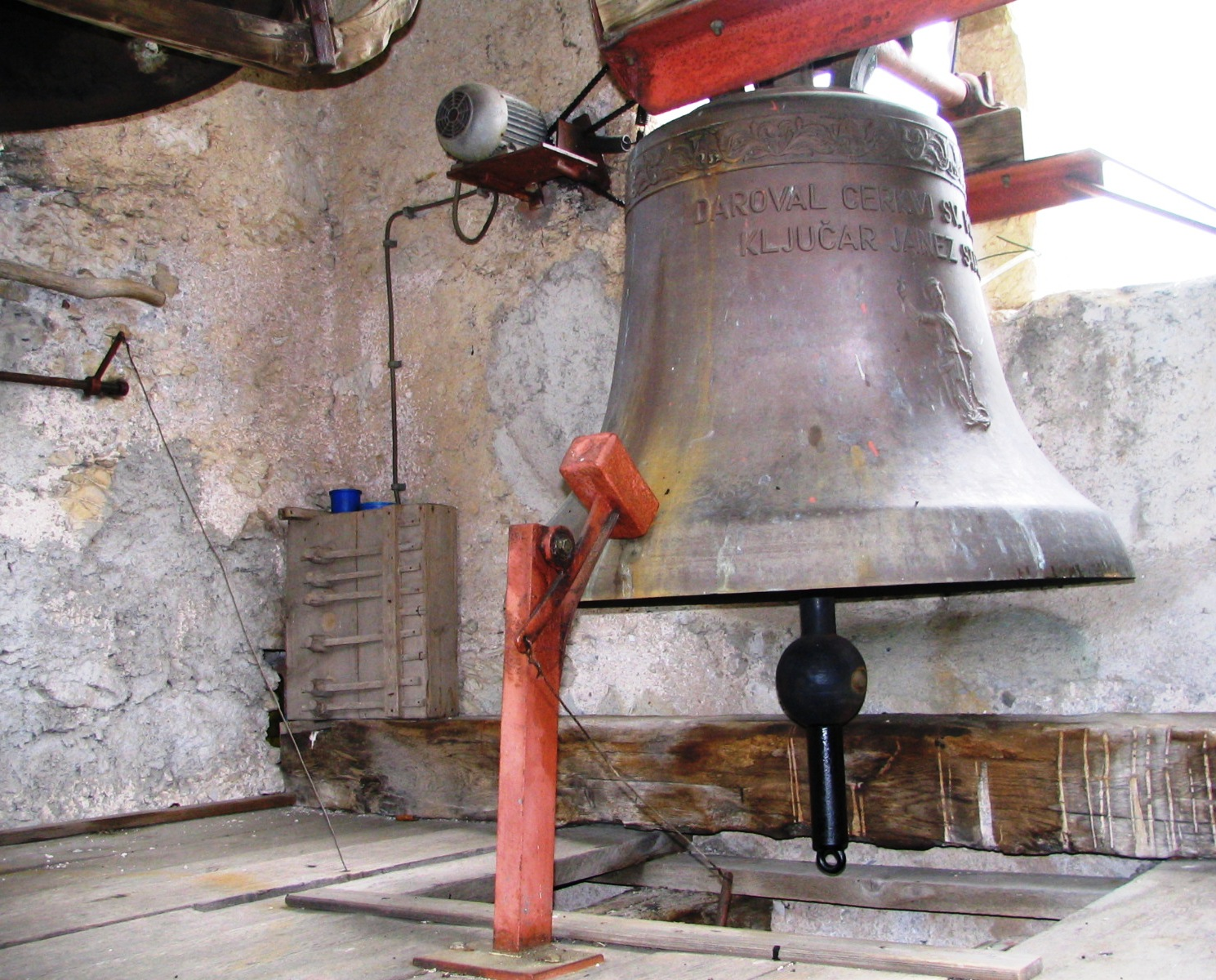
Bell tower interior, Saint Margaret's Church: mechanized bell and ratchet (left) used during the Paschal Triduum

There are two churches above the settlement, one dedicated to Saint Margaret and the other to Saint James. Saint Margaret's Church dates to the early 16th century and was built on the site of an earlier church. The interior was painted with frescos in 1742. It is a late Gothic structure and tradition says that it was built with material salvaged from the ruins of the nearby fortress at Jetrbenk Hill. It is a single-nave structure with a star-vaulted nave and sculpted keystones. The frescoes on the triumphal arch date from the 17th century. The main altar was consecrated in the late 17th century, and the altars dedicated to Saint Anthony, Saint James, and the Trinity date from 1666, 1657, and 1646, respectively. The crucifixion group on the arch beam was created in 1680.

Saint James' Church was built at the beginning of the 16th century. It is a Baroque structure with the year 1751 on the triumphal arch. The main altar was probably created by Štefan Šubic (1820–1884), and the altar dedicated to Saints Cosmas and Damian dates from the end of the 17th century. It contains the cabinet from a late Gothic winged altar with a statue of Saint James dating from the second half of the 15th century.

== Notable people ==
Notable people that were born or lived in Žlebe include:

- Franc Kristan (1873–1940), journalist
