= Žubina =

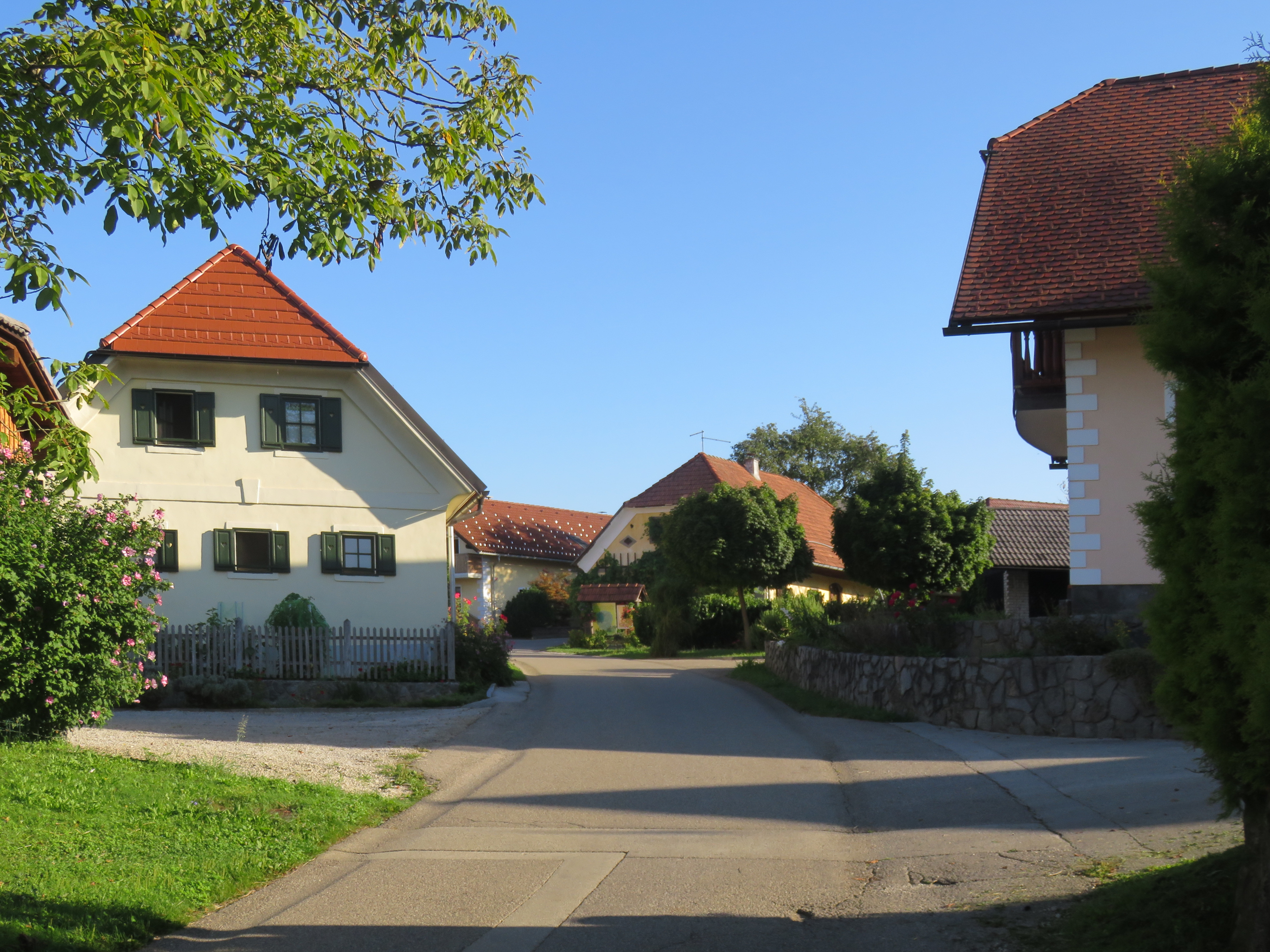

- Location in Slovenia
- Coordinates: 45°56′52.65″N 14°54′52.57″E
- Country: Slovenia
- Traditional region: Lower Carniola
- Statistical region: Southeast Slovenia
- Municipality: Trebnje

Area
  - Total: 1.31 km^{2} (0.51 sq mi)
- Elevation: 337.2 m (1,106 ft)

Population (2002)
  - Total: 94

Žubina (pronounced [ˈʒuːbina]) is a small village in the Municipality of Trebnje in eastern Slovenia. It lies north of Veliki Gaber. The area is part of the traditional region of Lower Carniola. The municipality is now included in the Southeast Slovenia Statistical Region.

== Church ==
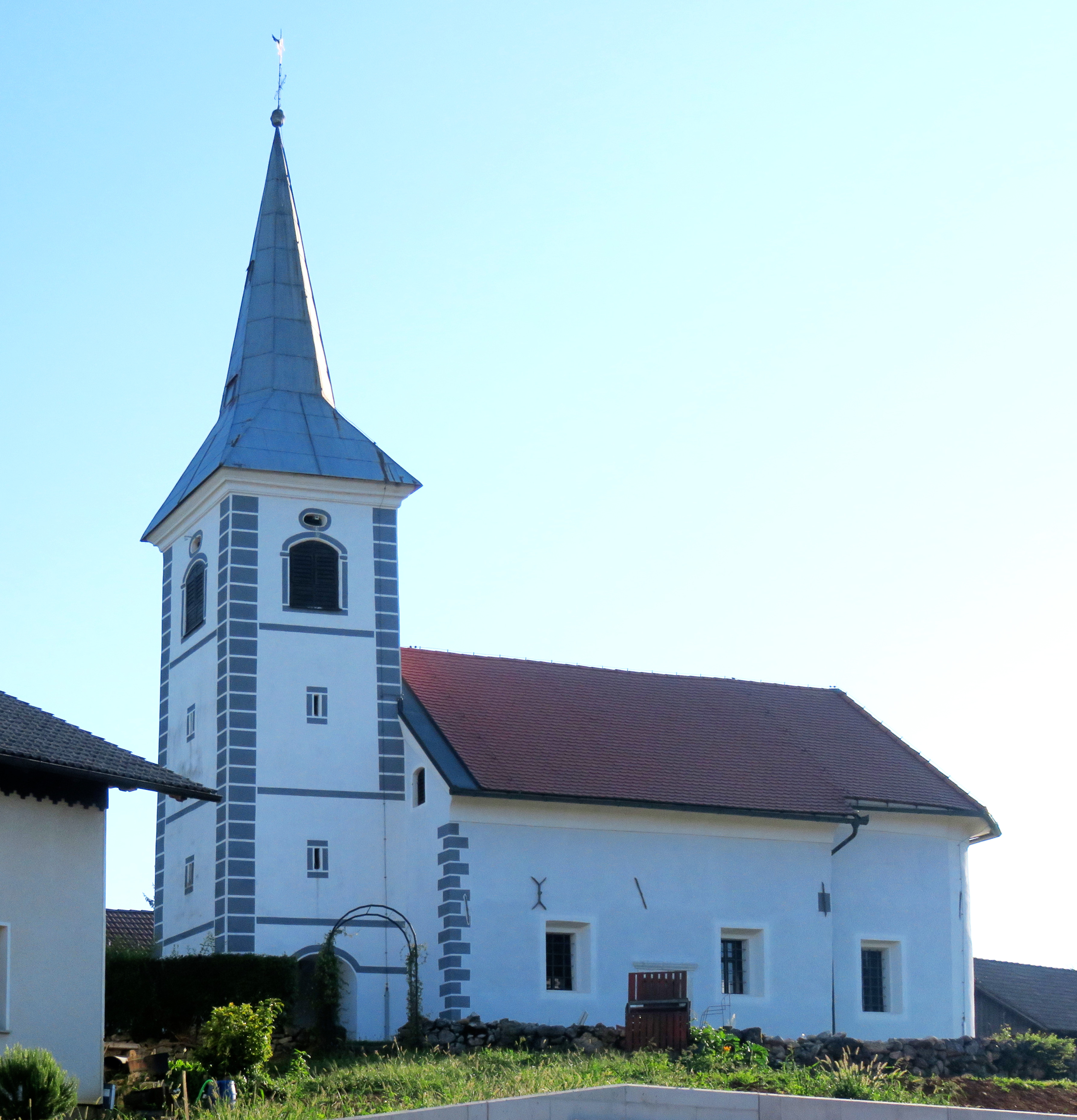
Holy Spirit Church

The local church is dedicated to the Holy Spirit and belongs to the Parish of Veliki Gaber. It has a 15th-century nave that was extended and vaulted in the 18th century when the current belfry was also built.
