= Županje Njive =

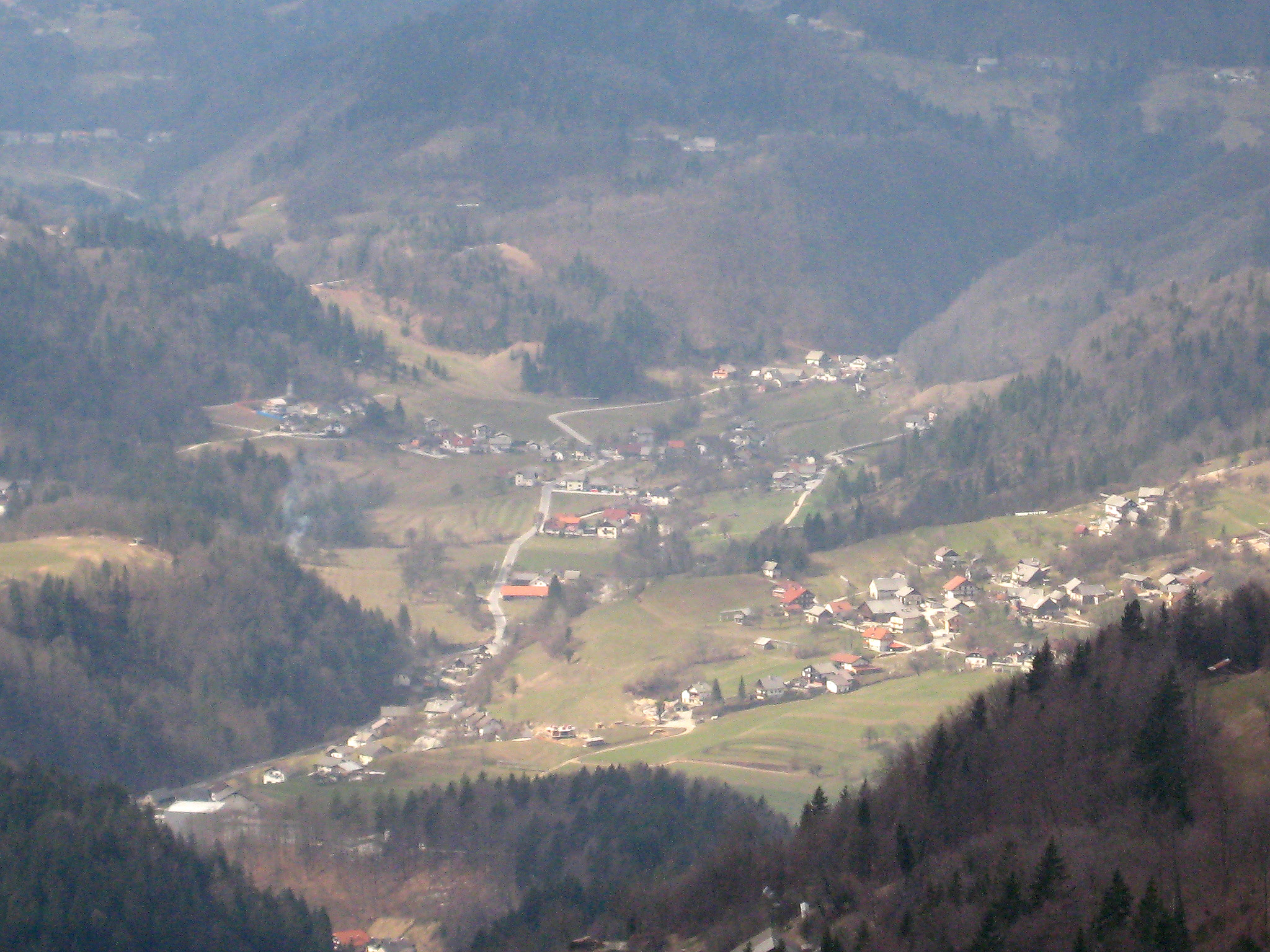

- Location in Slovenia
- Coordinates: 46°16′8.23″N 14°35′52.14″E
- Country: Slovenia
- Traditional region: Upper Carniola
- Statistical region: Central Slovenia
- Municipality: Kamnik

Area
  - Total: 2.55 km^{2} (0.98 sq mi)
- Elevation: 484.5 m (1,590 ft)

Population (2002)
  - Total: 316

Županje Njive (pronounced [ʒuˈpaːnjɛ ˈnjiːʋɛ]; German: Supaineniwe) is a settlement on the Kamnik Bistrica River in the Municipality of Kamnik in the Upper Carniola region of Slovenia.

== Chapel-shrine ==
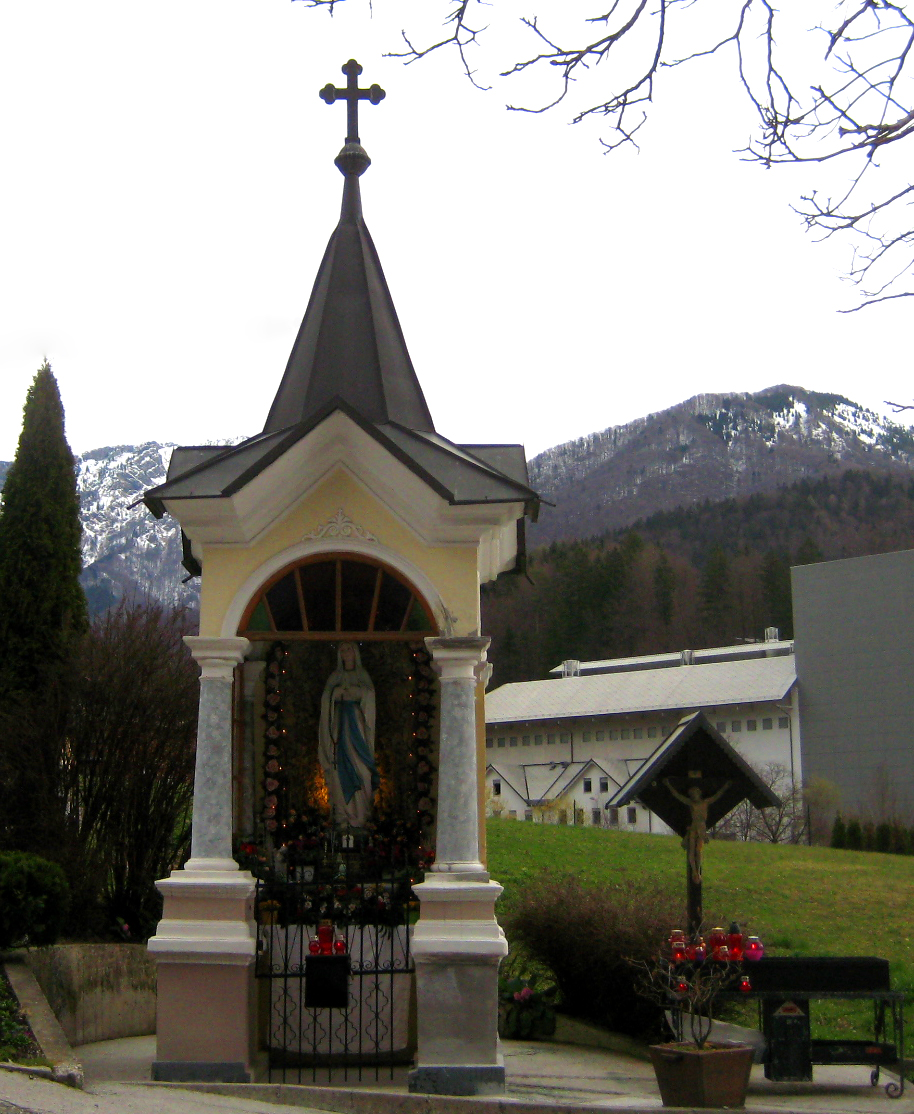
Our Lady of Lourdes Chapel

A chapel-shrine, dedicated to the Virgin Mary, stands in the village. It was built in 1908 and contains a statue of Our Lady of Lourdes, made by the sculptor Franc Ksaver Tončič from Kamnik. Since 1988, it has been rumoured to have miraculous powers and is visited by numerous pilgrims.
