= Žaga, Velike Lašče =

Žaga
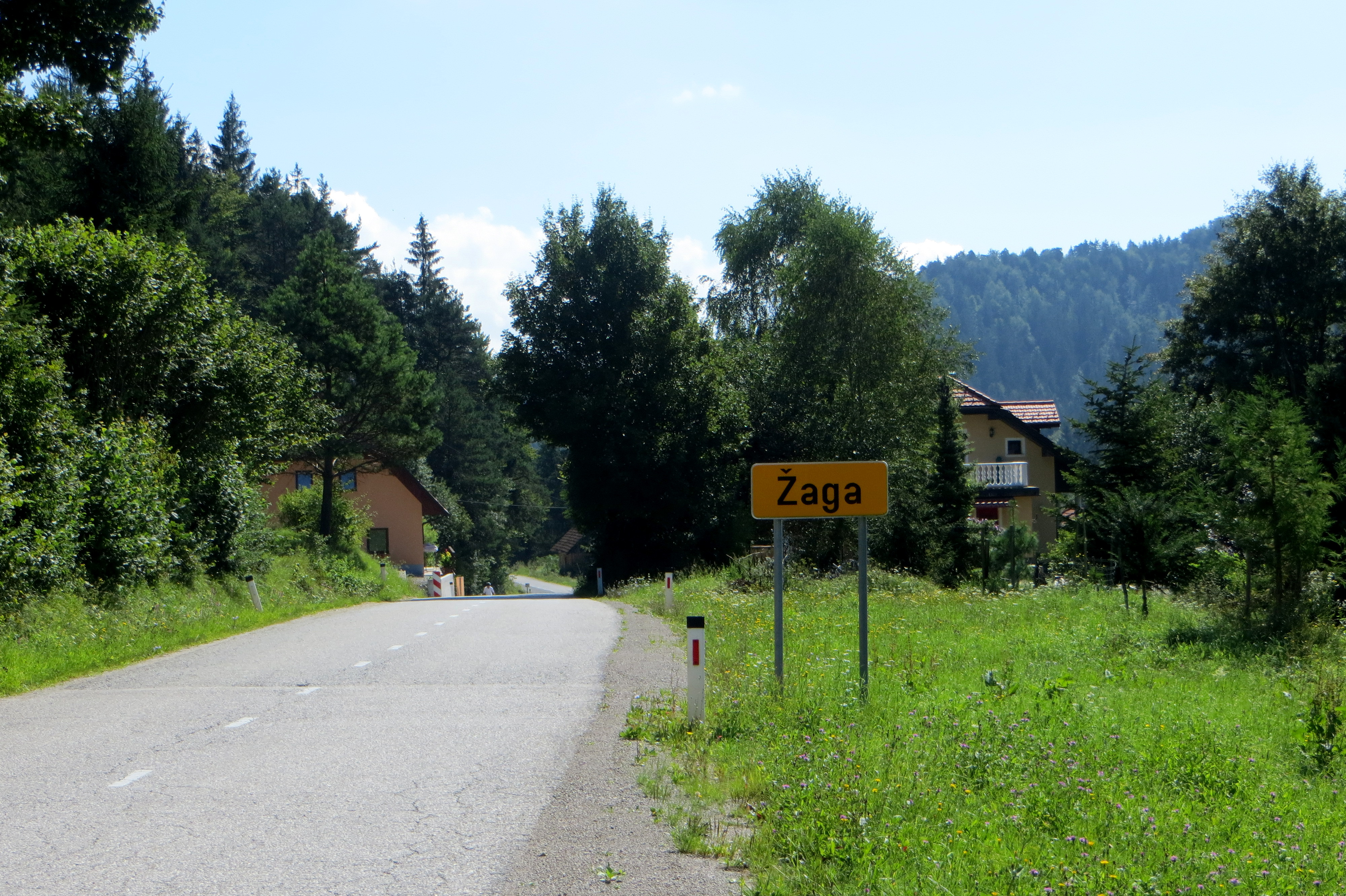

- Location in Slovenia
- Coordinates: 45°48′17.93″N 14°35′0.7″E
- Country: Slovenia
- Traditional region: Lower Carniola
- Statistical region: Central Slovenia
- Municipality: Velike Lašče

Area
  - Total: 0.91 km^{2} (0.35 sq mi)
- Elevation: 549.5 m (1,803 ft)

Population (2002)
  - Total: 4
- Postal code: 1315

Žaga (pronounced [ˈʒaːɡa]) is a small settlement in the hills southwest of Velike Lašče in central Slovenia. The area is part of the traditional region of Lower Carniola and is now included in the Central Slovenia Statistical Region.
