= Žvirče =

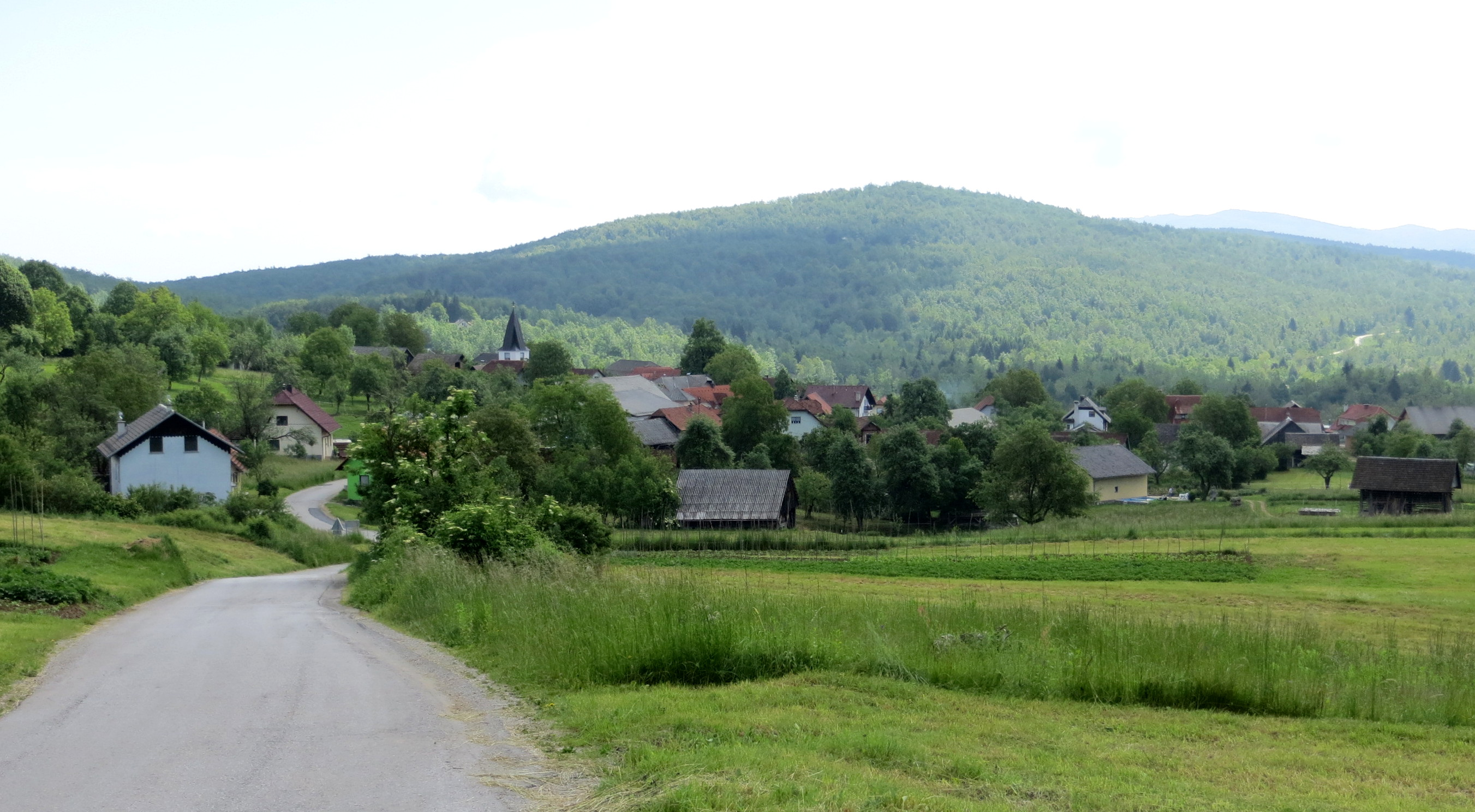

- Location in Slovenia
- Coordinates: 45°46′58.53″N 14°49′27.06″E
- Country: Slovenia
- Traditional region: Lower Carniola
- Statistical region: Southeast Slovenia
- Municipality: Žužemberk

Area
  - Total: 12.86 km^{2} (4.97 sq mi)
- Elevation: 436.1 m (1,431 ft)

Population (2002)
  - Total: 152

Žvirče (pronounced [ˈʒʋiːɾtʃɛ]; German: Schwörz) is a village in the Municipality of Žužemberk in southeastern Slovenia. The area is part of the historical region of Lower Carniola and is now included in the Southeast Slovenia Statistical Region.

== History ==
Žvirče was burned several times by Italian forces during the Second World War. The school was burned in a Partisan attack in March 1943, and the village came under German aerial bombardment on 1 March 1944 and six villagers were killed. At the end of 1944, six Partisans were killed and 11 wounded in an engagement with German forces. On 15 March 1945, the 15th division of the Yugoslav Partisans burned the village and evicted the population.

== Church ==
The former church in Žvirče was dedicated to John the Baptist and was dynamited by the Partisans on 15 March 1945. A new church in Žvirče was built in 1972. It is a chapel of ease dedicated to Maximilian Kolbe.
