= Todraž =

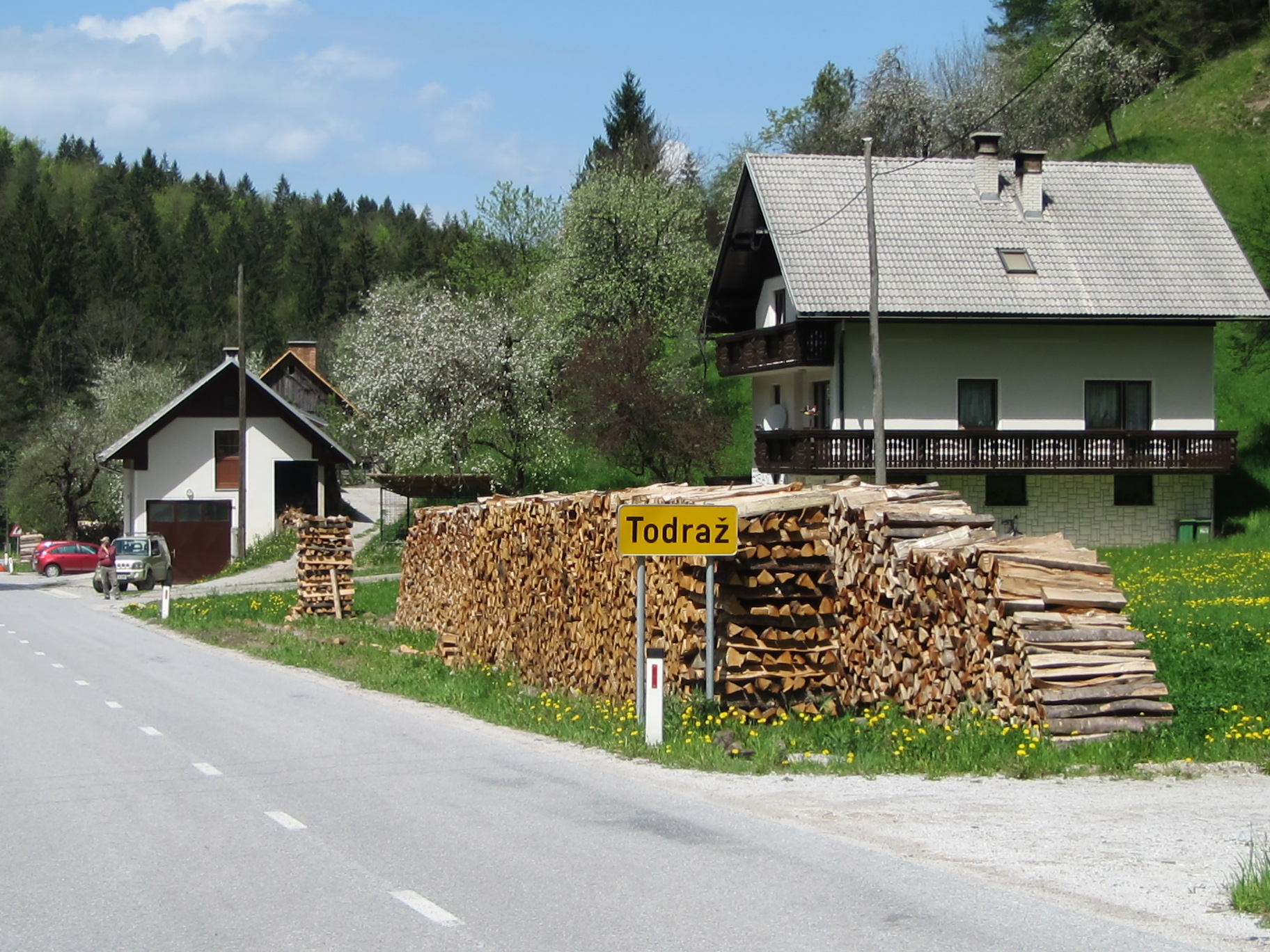
- Todraž

- Location in Slovenia
- Coordinates: 46°5′10.61″N 14°9′40.68″E
- Country: Slovenia
- Traditional region: Upper Carniola
- Statistical region: Upper Carniola
- Municipality: Gorenja Vas–Poljane

Area
  - Total: 1.37 km^{2} (0.53 sq mi)
- Elevation: 418.5 m (1,373 ft)

Population (2020)
  - Total: 17
  - Density: 12/km^{2} (32/sq mi)

Todraž (pronounced [ˈtoːdɾaʃ]) is a small settlement southeast of Gorenja Vas in the Municipality of Gorenja Vas–Poljane in the Upper Carniola region of Slovenia.

== Name ==
The name Todraž was first attested in written sources as Witodras in 1291 and 1381 (and Wittodrasy in 1501). These attestations indicate that it is derived from *Vitodraž, in turn based on the Slavic personal name Vitodrag.

== Uranium mine ==
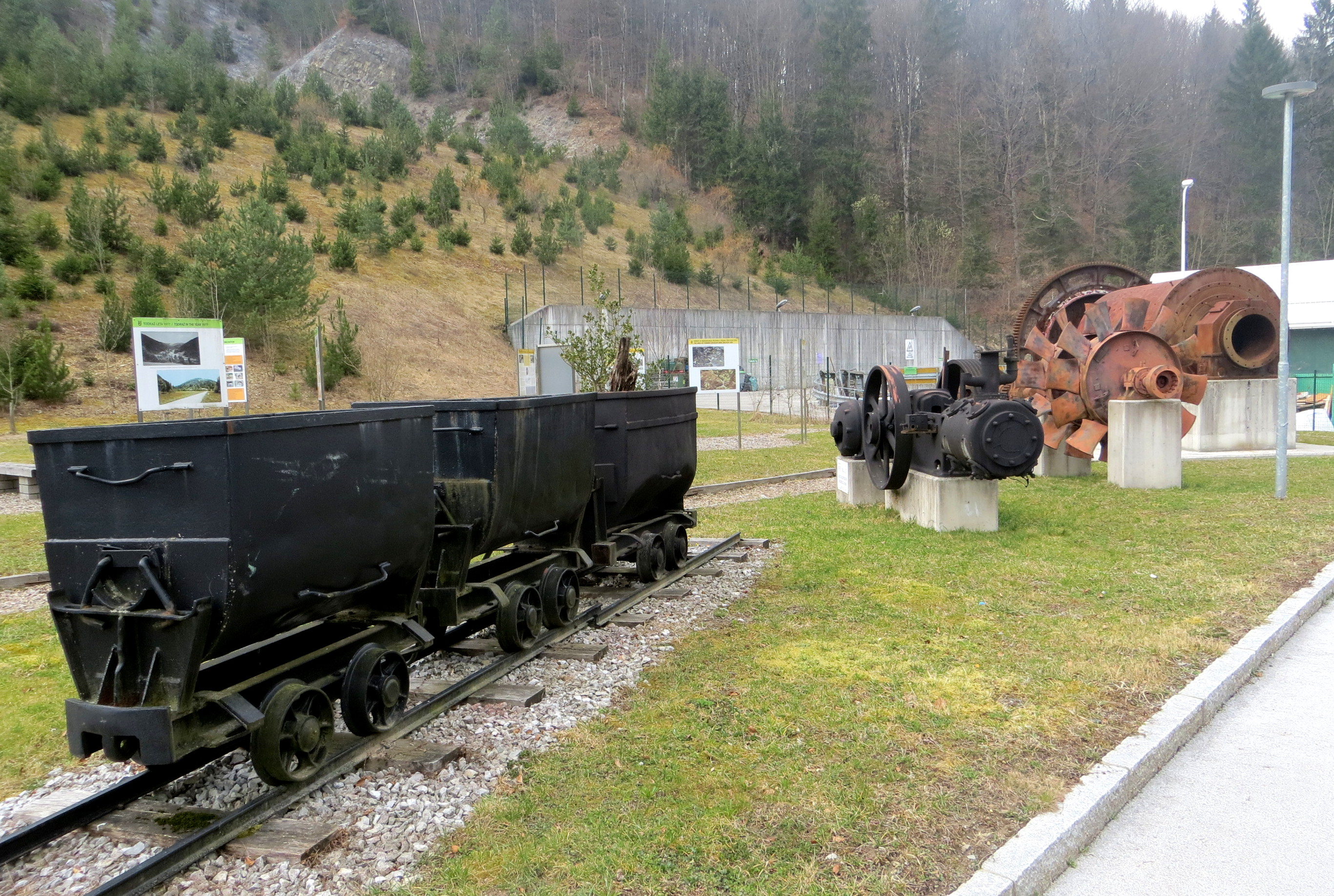
Old mining equipment in Todraž

The headquarters of the Žirovski Vrh Uranium Mine are in the settlement. The mine was permanently closed in the 1990s and the site has been cleaned up by the company in charge of closing the mine, Rudnik Žirovski Vrh, based in Todraž.
