= Žaga, Kamnik =

Žaga
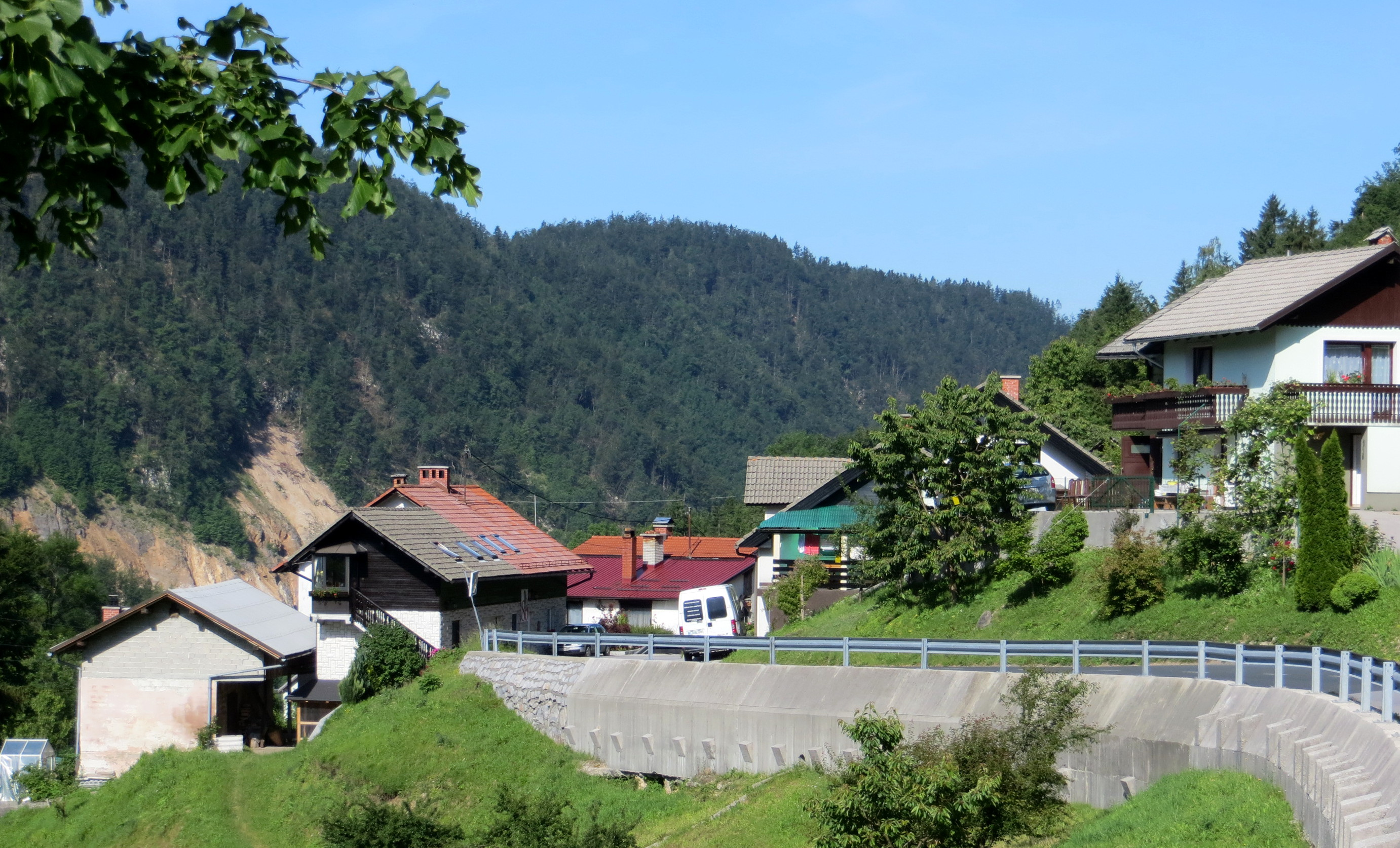

- Location in Slovenia
- Coordinates: 46°17′11.13″N 14°39′35.01″E
- Country: Slovenia
- Traditional region: Upper Carniola
- Statistical region: Central Slovenia
- Municipality: Kamnik

Area
  - Total: 7.04 km^{2} (2.72 sq mi)
- Elevation: 1,495.9 m (4,908 ft)

Population (2002)
  - Total: 63

Žaga (pronounced [ˈʒaːɡa]) is a dispersed settlement that extends from the valley leading up to the Črnivec Pass up to the Big Pasture Plateau (Slovene: Velika planina) in the Municipality of Kamnik in the Upper Carniola region of Slovenia.
