= Žabjek v Podbočju =

Žabjek v Podbočju Žabjek (until 1955)
- Location in Slovenia
- Coordinates: 45°51′32.66″N 15°27′22.54″E
- Country: Slovenia
- Traditional region: Lower Carniola
- Statistical region: Lower Sava
- Municipality: Krško

Area
  - Total: 0.43 km^{2} (0.17 sq mi)
- Elevation: 162 m (531 ft)

Population (2002)
  - Total: 53
- Postal code: 8312

Žabjek v Podbočju (pronounced [ˈʒaːbjɛk ʍ pɔdˈbóːtʃju]) is a village on the right bank of the Krka River southwest of Podbočje in the Municipality of Krško in eastern Slovenia. The area is part of the traditional region of Lower Carniola. It is now included in the Lower Sava Statistical Region.

== Name ==
The name of the settlement was changed from Žabjek to Žabjek v Podbočju in 1955.

== Cultural heritage ==
A small chapel-shrine at the village spring was built in the mid-19th century.
