= Žirovski Vrh Svetega Urbana =

Žirovski Vrh Svetega Urbana Žirovski Vrh nad Zalo (1955–1994)
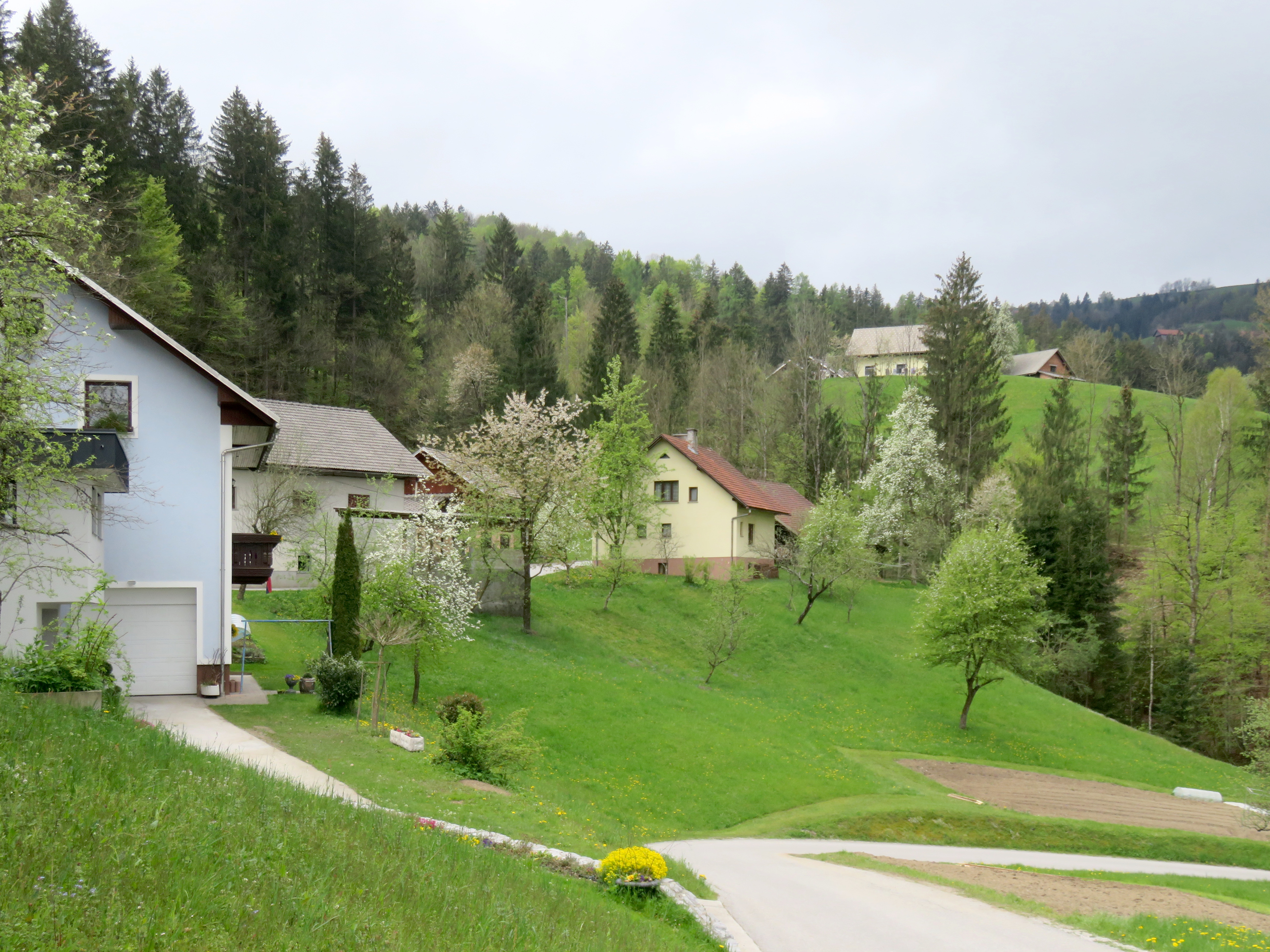
- The Svink and Rovtar farms in Žirovski Vrh Svetega Urbana

- Location in Slovenia
- Coordinates: 46°4′9.95″N 14°8′45.29″E
- Country: Slovenia
- Traditional region: Upper Carniola
- Statistical region: Upper Carniola
- Municipality: Gorenja Vas–Poljane

Area
  - Total: 5.67 km^{2} (2.19 sq mi)
- Elevation: 875.5 m (2,872 ft)

Population (2020)
  - Total: 137
  - Density: 24.2/km^{2} (62.6/sq mi)

Žirovski Vrh Svetega Urbana (pronounced [ʒiˈɾoːu̯ski ˈʋəɾx ˈsʋeːtɛɡa uɾˈbaːna]) is a dispersed settlement above Todraž in the Municipality of Gorenja Vas–Poljane in the Upper Carniola region of Slovenia.

== Name ==
The name of the settlement was changed from Žirovski Vrh Svetega Urbana (literally, 'Žiri Peak of Saint Urban') to Žirovski Vrh nad Zalo (literally, 'Žiri Peak above Zala') in 1955. The name was changed on the basis of the 1948 Law on Names of Settlements and Designations of Squares, Streets, and Buildings as part of efforts by Slovenia's postwar communist government to remove religious elements from toponyms. The name Žirovski Vrh Svetega Urbana was restored in 1994.

== History ==
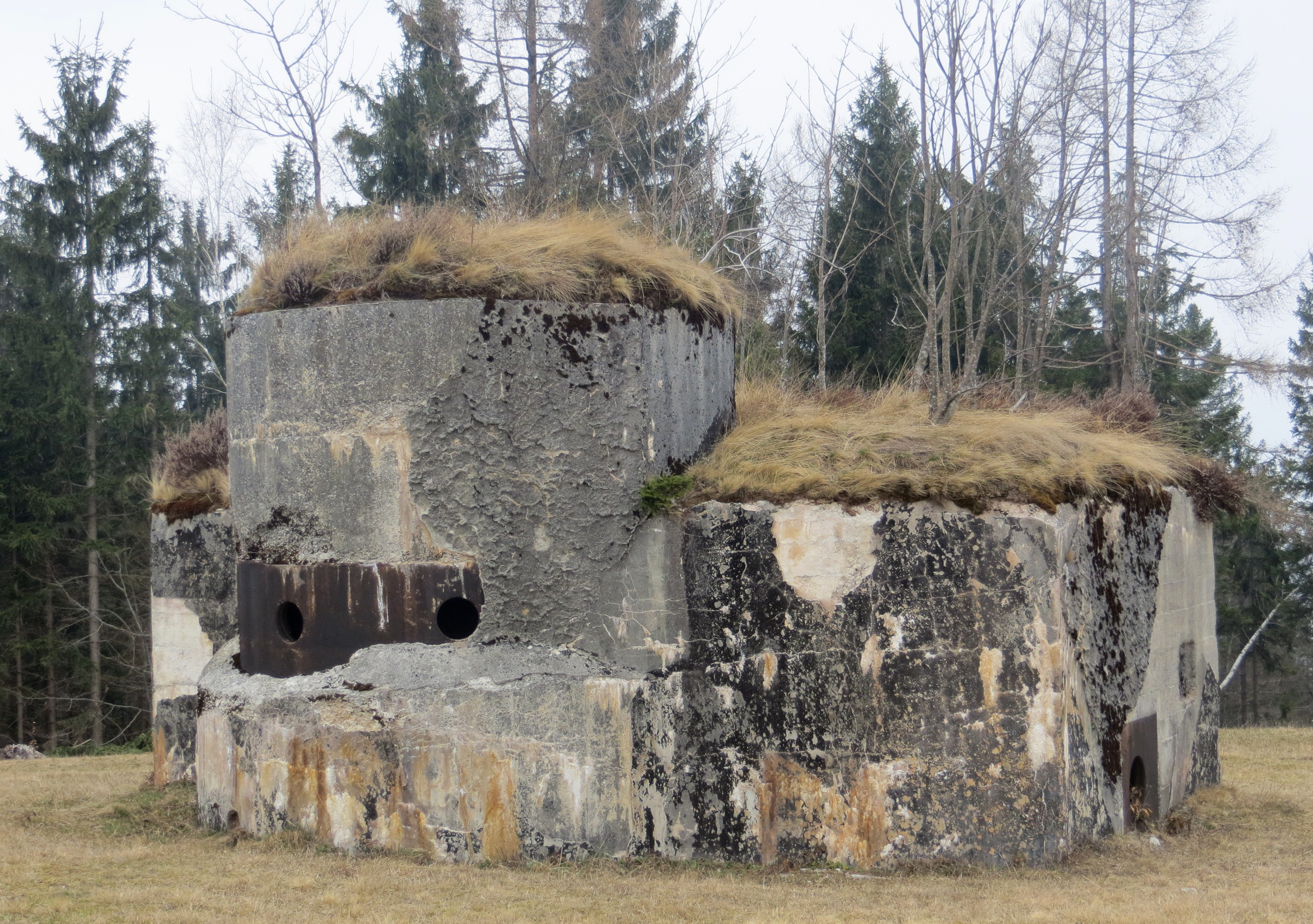
Rupnik Line pillbox in Žirovski Vrh Svetega Urbana

The Rupnik Line, a line of fortifications and weapons installations, was built in the area in the 1930s. Several pillboxes from the line are preserved in the village's territory.

== Industry ==
In the northeastern part of the settlement, there is a site where the tailings from the nearby uranium mine were deposited in the past. The mine was permanently closed in the 1990s and the site has been cleaned up by the company in charge of closing the mine, Rudnik Žirovski Vrh, based in Todraž.
