= Železno, Trebnje =

Železno
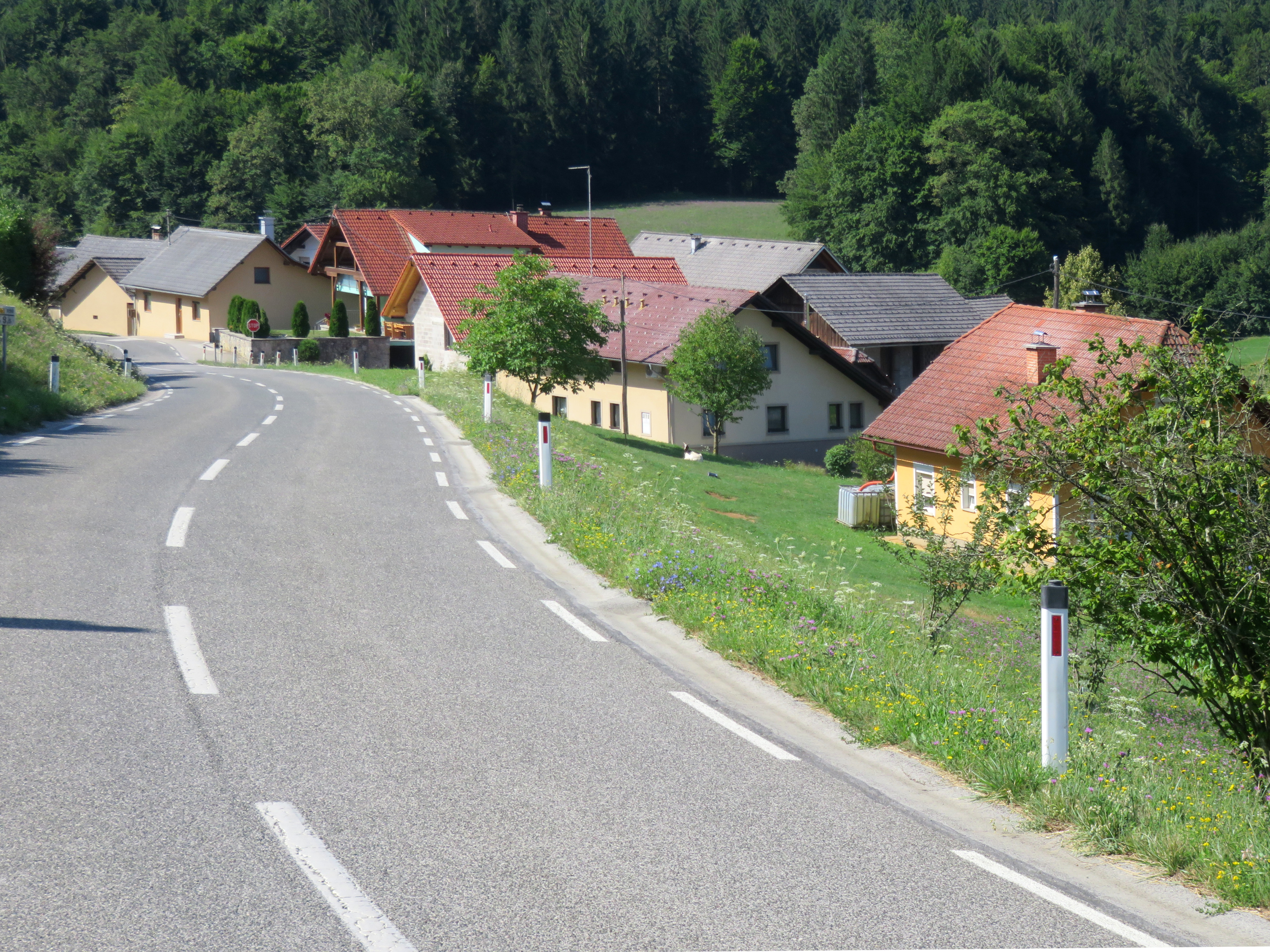

- Location in Slovenia
- Coordinates: 45°53′4.05″N 14°57′26.9″E
- Country: Slovenia
- Traditional region: Lower Carniola
- Statistical region: Southeast Slovenia
- Municipality: Trebnje

Area
  - Total: 0.9 km^{2} (0.35 sq mi)
- Elevation: 262.2 m (860 ft)

Population (2002)
  - Total: 58

Železno (pronounced [ʒɛˈleːznɔ]) is a small settlement northwest of Dobrnič in the Municipality of Trebnje in eastern Slovenia. The area is part of the traditional region of Lower Carniola and is included in the Southeast Slovenia Statistical Region.
