= Žirovski Vrh Svetega Antona =

Žirovski Vrh Svetega Antona Žirovski Vrh nad Gorenjo vasjo (1955–1994)
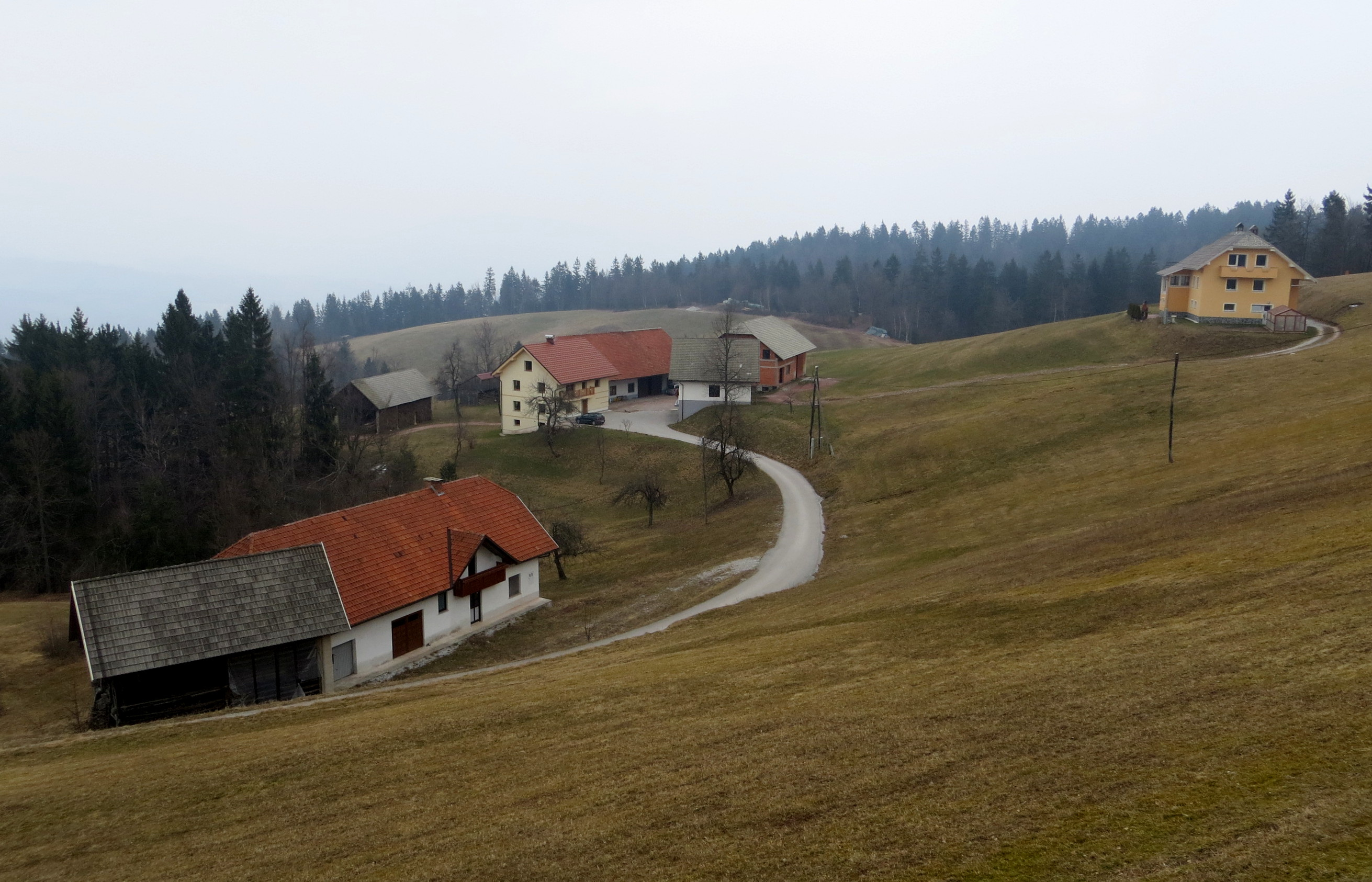
- The hamlet of Kolišar in Žirovski Vrh Svetega Antona

- Location in Slovenia
- Coordinates: 46°5′5.28″N 14°7′54.16″E
- Country: Slovenia
- Traditional region: Upper Carniola
- Statistical region: Upper Carniola
- Municipality: Gorenja Vas–Poljane

Area
  - Total: 2.72 km^{2} (1.05 sq mi)
- Elevation: 693.3 m (2,275 ft)

Population (2020)
  - Total: 58
  - Density: 21/km^{2} (55/sq mi)

Žirovski Vrh Svetega Antona (pronounced [ʒiˈɾoːu̯ski ˈʋəɾx ˈsʋeːtɛɡa anˈtoːna]) is a dispersed settlement above Gorenja Vas in the Municipality of Gorenja Vas–Poljane in the Upper Carniola region of Slovenia.

== Name ==
The name of the settlement was changed from Žirovski Vrh Svetega Antona (literally, 'Žiri Peak of Saint Anthony') to Žirovski Vrh nad Gorenjo vasjo (literally, 'Žiri Peak above Gorenja Vas') in 1955. The name was changed on the basis of the 1948 Law on Names of Settlements and Designations of Squares, Streets, and Buildings as part of efforts by Slovenia's postwar communist government to remove religious elements from toponyms. The name Žirovski Vrh Svetega Antona was restored in 1994.

== History ==
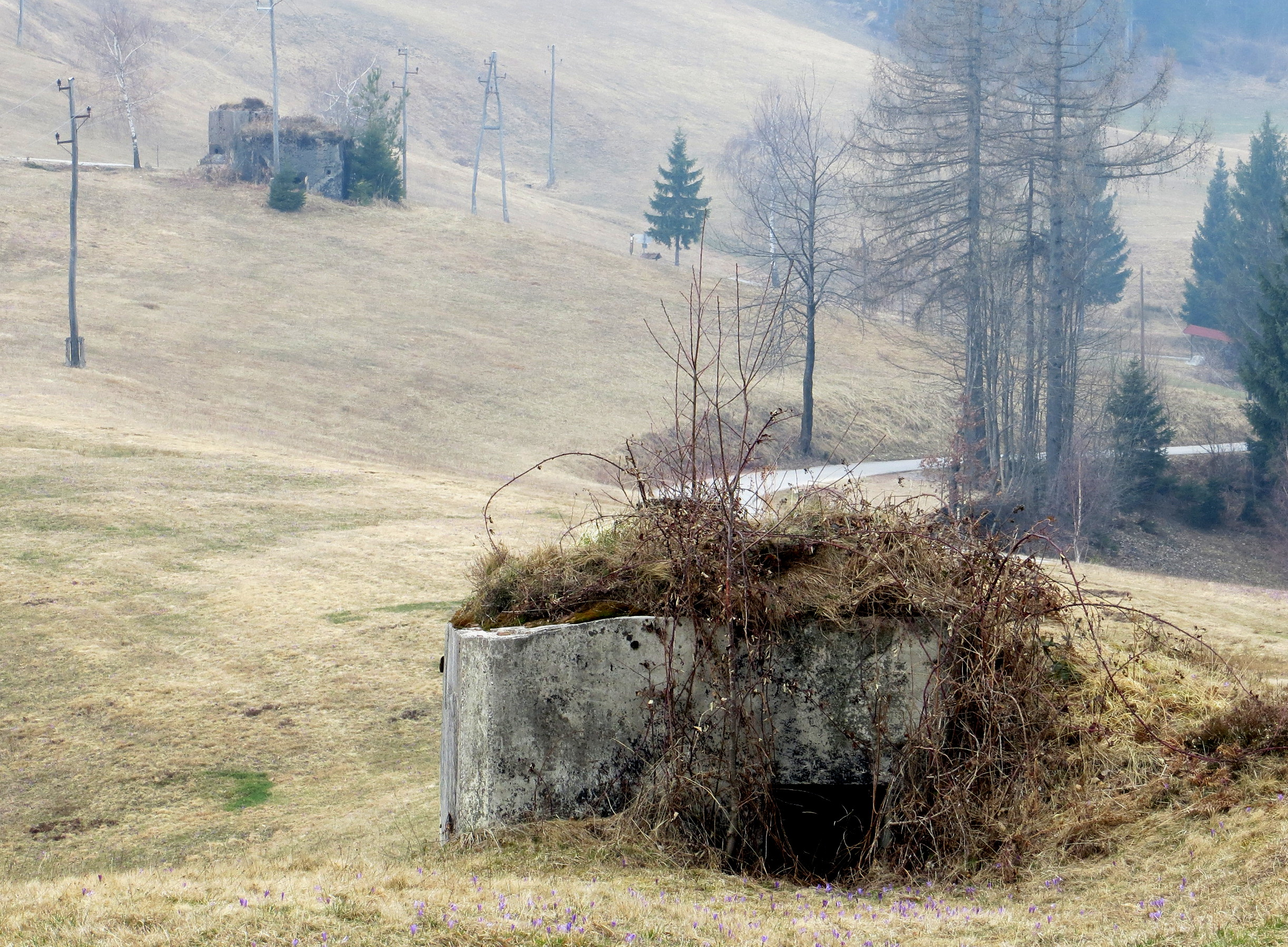
Rupnik Line pillboxes in Žirovski Vrh Svetega Antona

The Rupnik Line, a line of fortifications and weapons installations, was built in the area in the 1930s. Several pillboxes from the line are preserved in the village's territory.
