= Dolenja Ravan =

Dolenja Ravan Dolenje Ravni (local name)
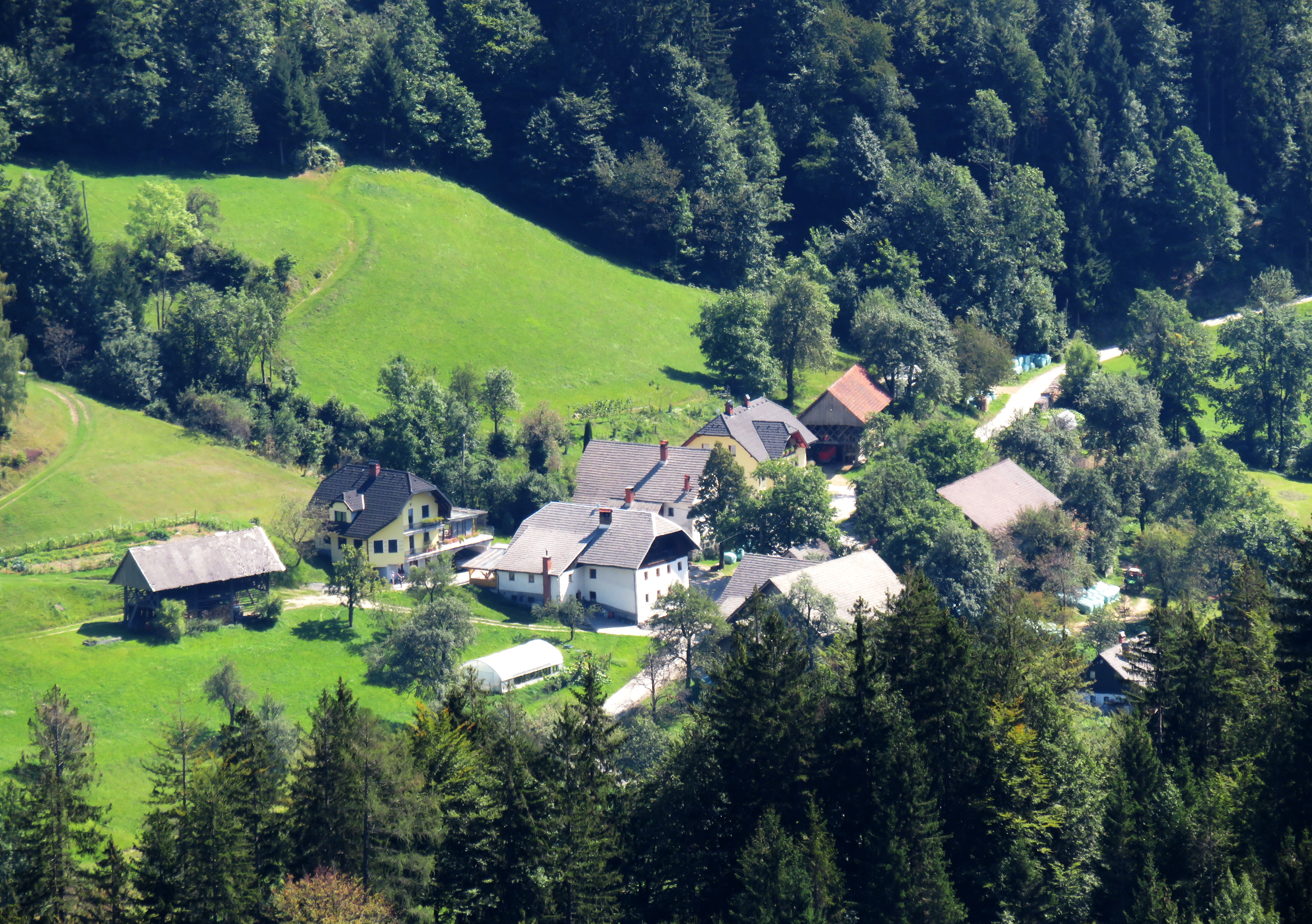

- Location in Slovenia
- Coordinates: 46°9′5.28″N 14°8′34.21″E
- Country: Slovenia
- Traditional region: Upper Carniola
- Statistical region: Upper Carniola
- Municipality: Gorenja Vas–Poljane

Area
  - Total: 0.37 km^{2} (0.14 sq mi)
- Elevation: 667.9 m (2,191 ft)

Population (2020)
  - Total: 20
  - Density: 54/km^{2} (140/sq mi)

Dolenja Ravan (pronounced [dɔˈleːnja ɾaˈʋaːn]; locally also Dolenje Ravni) is a small settlement in the hills above Poljane nad Škofjo Loko in the Municipality of Gorenja Vas–Poljane in the Upper Carniola region of Slovenia.

== Name ==
Locally, Dolenja Ravan is known as Dolenje Ravni. The name Dolenja Ravan literally means 'lower flatland, lower plateau' (in contrast to neighboring Gorenja Ravan; literally, 'upper flatland, upper plateau'). The common noun ravan 'flatland, plateau' is relatively common in Slovene toponyms.

== Notable people ==
Notable people that were born or lived in Dolenja Ravan include:

- Gregor Jereb (1845–1893), journalist
- Maks Miklavčič (1900–1971), historian
