= Čabrače =

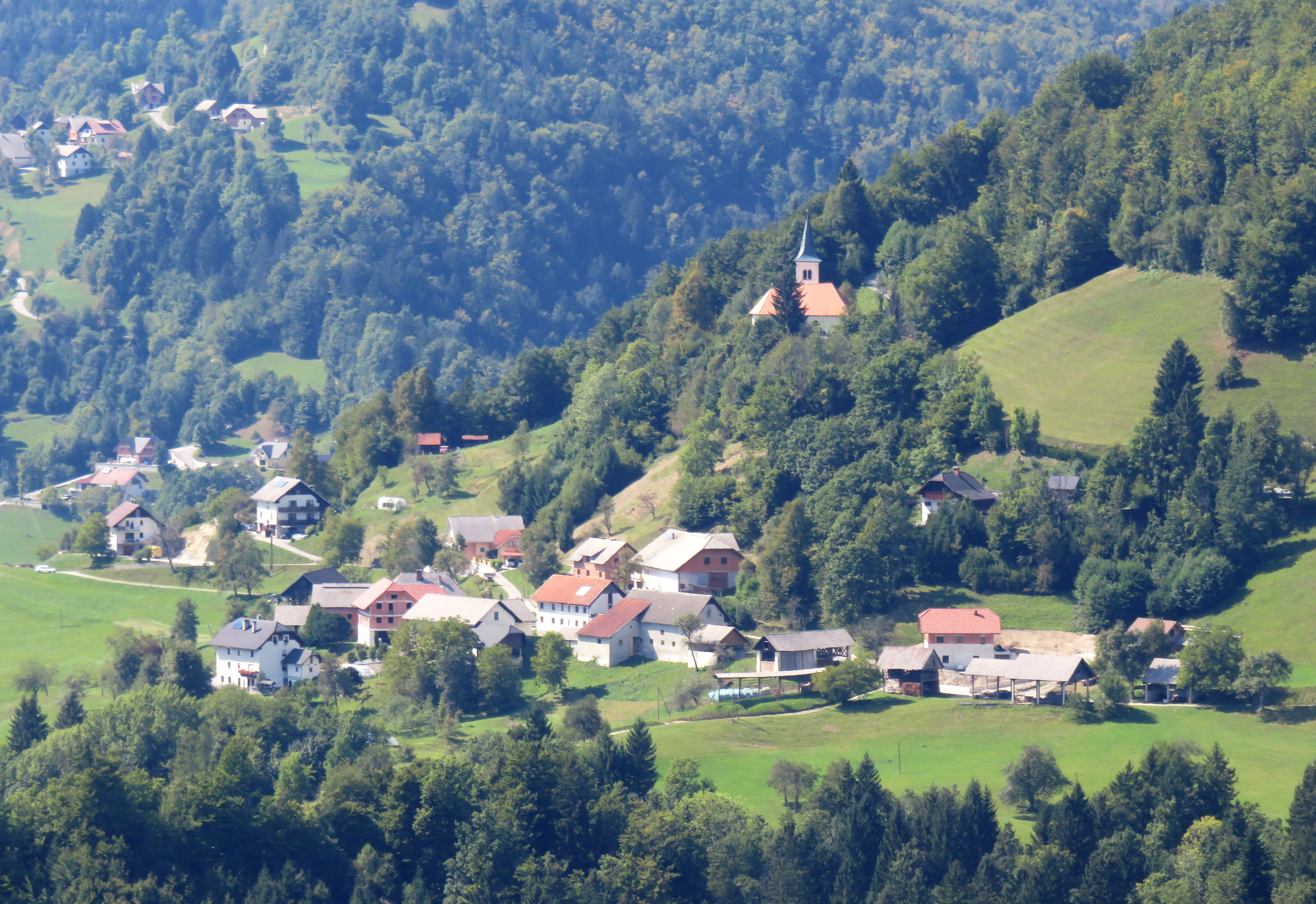

- Location in Slovenia
- Coordinates: 46°7′57.62″N 14°7′14.65″E
- Country: Slovenia
- Traditional region: Upper Carniola
- Statistical region: Upper Carniola
- Municipality: Gorenja Vas–Poljane

Area
  - Total: 3.09 km^{2} (1.19 sq mi)
- Elevation: 621 m (2,037 ft)

Population (2020)
  - Total: 55
  - Density: 18/km^{2} (46/sq mi)

Čabrače (pronounced [ˈtʃaːbɾatʃɛ]) is a small dispersed settlement in the Municipality of Gorenja Vas–Poljane in the Upper Carniola region of Slovenia.

== Name ==
Čabrače was attested in historical sources as Schabratssch in 1291, Schabratsch in 1420, and Tschbratzi in 1500. The name comes from the plural demonym *Ča(je)braťane based on the personal name *Ča(je)bratъ, thus meaning 'residents of Ča(je)bratъ's village'.

== Church ==
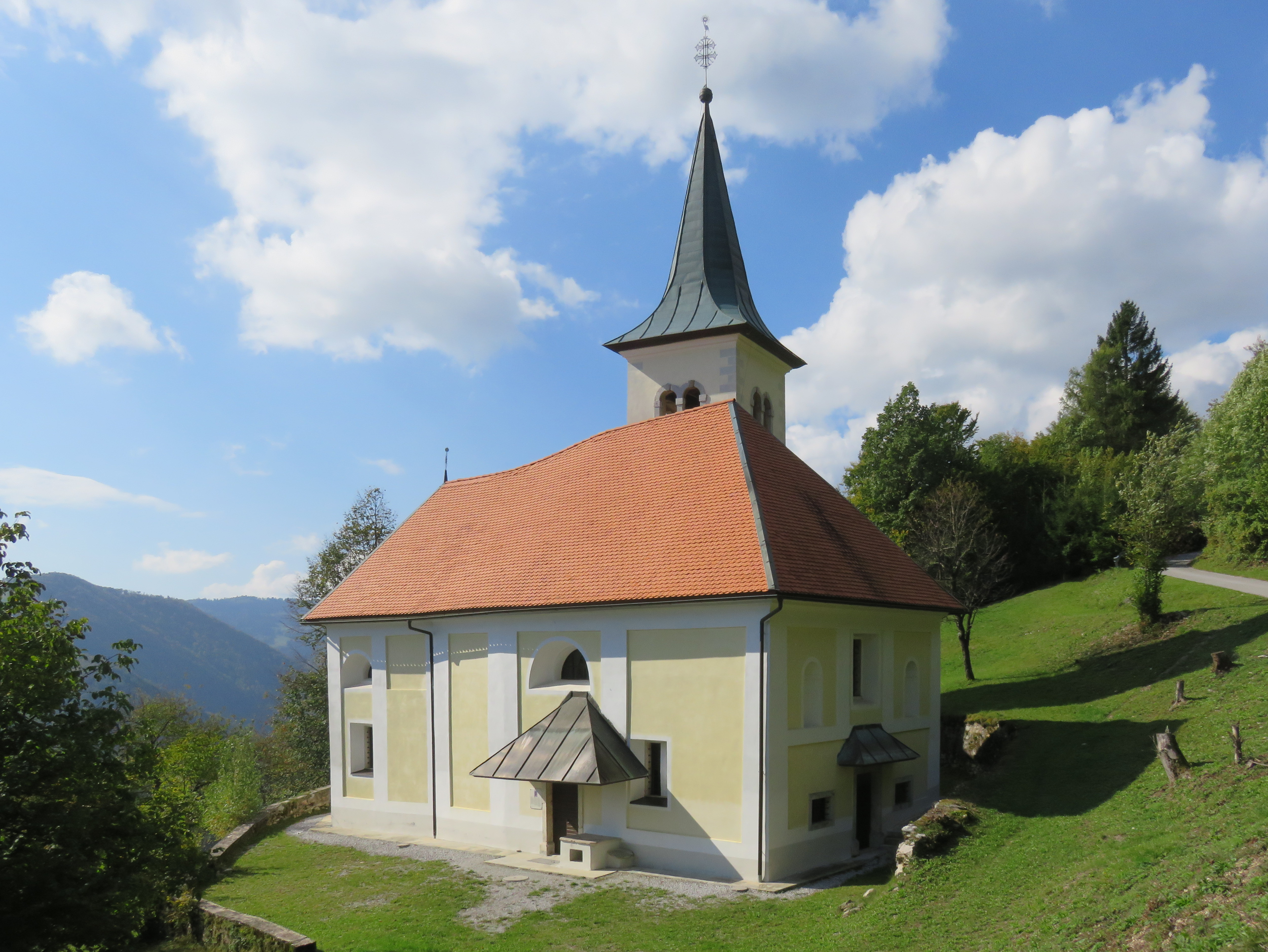
Saint Gertrude's Church

The local church is dedicated to Saint Gertrude (Slovene: sveta Jedrt). An older Gothic structure was remodeled in the early 18th century, when the belfry was also added.
