= Lovsko Brdo =

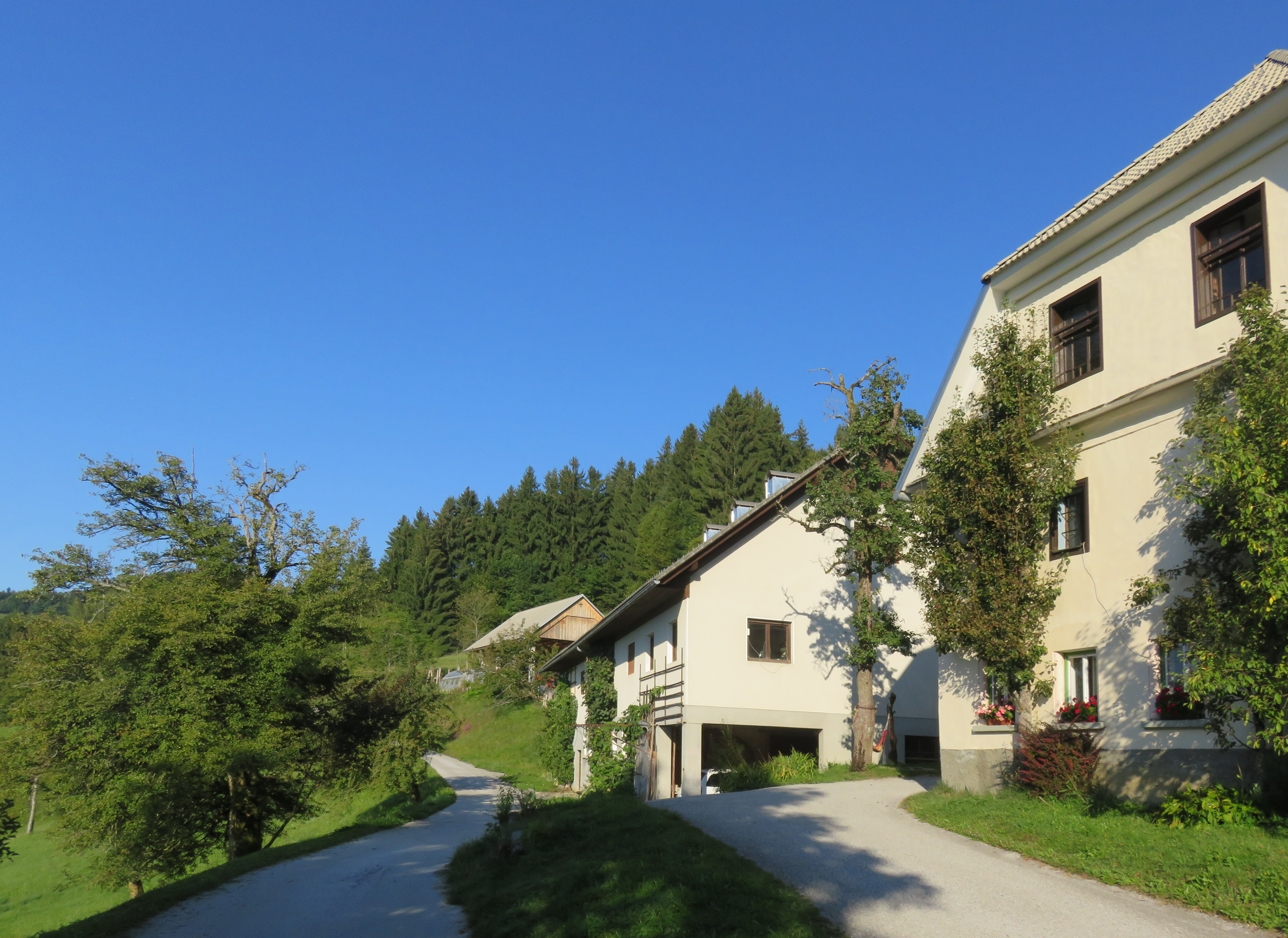

- Location in Slovenia
- Coordinates: 46°8′0.73″N 14°9′49.29″E
- Country: Slovenia
- Traditional region: Upper Carniola
- Statistical region: Upper Carniola
- Municipality: Gorenja Vas–Poljane

Area
  - Total: 0.69 km^{2} (0.27 sq mi)
- Elevation: 586.1 m (1,923 ft)

Population (2020)
  - Total: 31
  - Density: 45/km^{2} (120/sq mi)

Lovsko Brdo (pronounced [ˈloːu̯skɔ ˈbəɾdɔ]) is a small dispersed settlement above the village of Volča in the Municipality of Gorenja Vas–Poljane in the Upper Carniola region of Slovenia.
