= Municipality of Gorenja Vas–Poljane =

Municipality of Slovenia

Municipality of Gorenja Vas–Poljane Občina Gorenja vas - Poljane
- Municipality
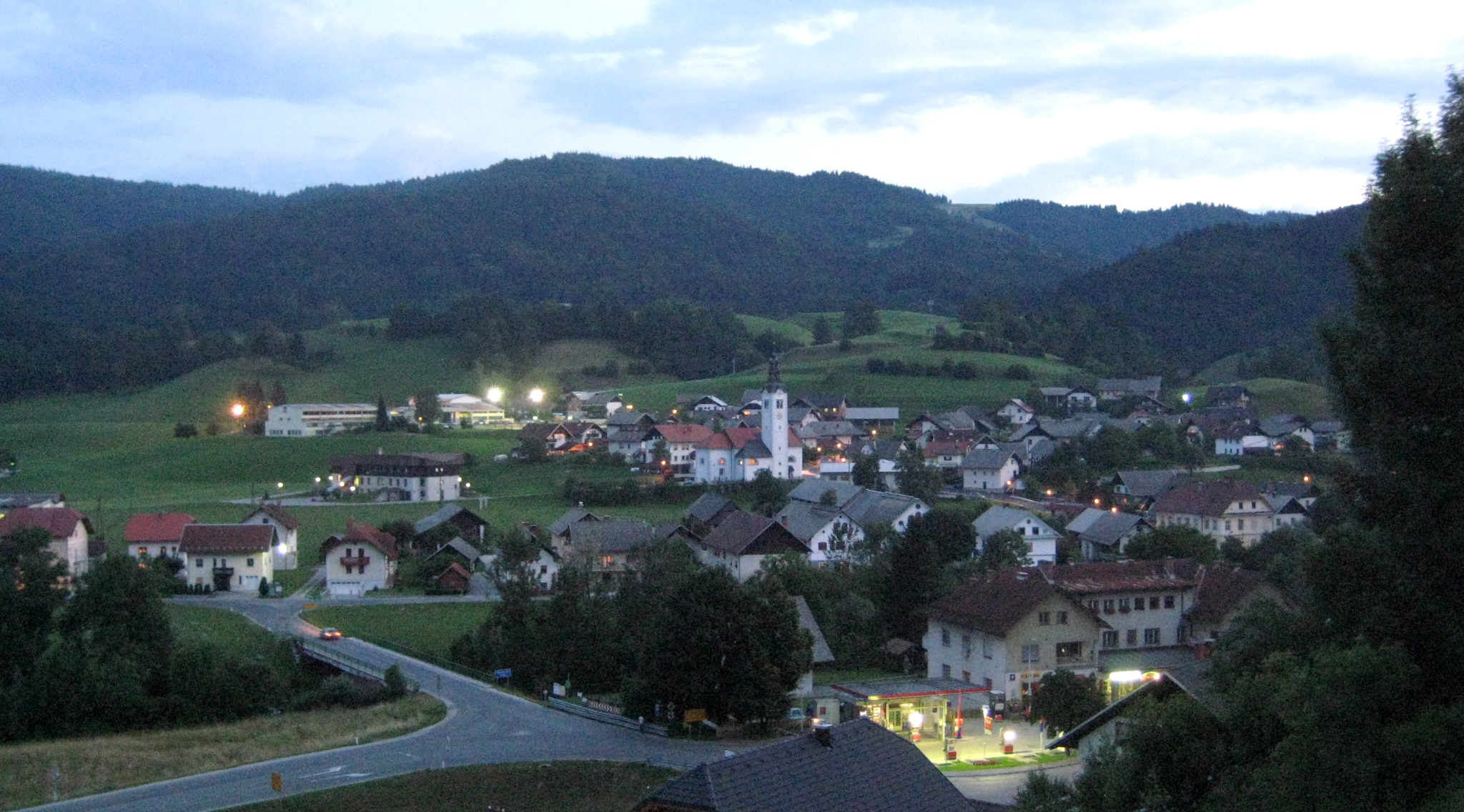
- Gorenja Vas

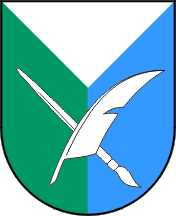
- Coat of arms

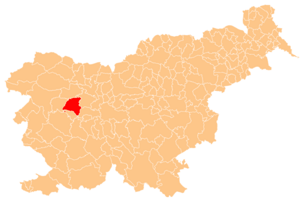
- Location of the Municipality of Gorenja Vas–Poljane in Slovenia
- Coordinates: 46°05′N 14°03′E
- Country: Slovenia

Government
  - Mayor: Milan Čadež (SDS)

Area
  - Total: 153.3 km^{2} (59.2 sq mi)

Population (2002)
  - Total: 6,877
  - Density: 44.86/km^{2} (116.2/sq mi)
- Time zone: UTC+01 (CET)
  - Summer (DST): UTC+02 (CEST)
- Website: www.obcina-gvp.si

The Municipality of Gorenja Vas–Poljane (pronounced [ɡɔˈɾeːnja ˈʋaːs pɔˈljaːnɛ]; Slovene: Občina Gorenja vas - Poljane) is a municipality in Slovenia. Its administrative seat is Gorenja Vas.

== Settlements ==
In addition to the municipal seat of Gorenja Vas, the municipality also includes the following settlements:

- Bačne
- Brebovnica
- Bukov Vrh
- Čabrače
- Četena Ravan
- Debeni
- Delnice
- Dobje
- Dobravšce
- Dolenčice
- Dolenja Dobrava
- Dolenja Ravan
- Dolenja Žetina
- Dolenje Brdo
- Dolge Njive
- Fužine
- Goli Vrh
- Gorenja Dobrava
- Gorenja Ravan
- Gorenja Žetina
- Gorenje Brdo
- Hlavče Njive
- Hobovše pri Stari Oselici
- Hotavlje
- Hotovlja
- Jarčje Brdo
- Javorje
- Javorjev Dol
- Jazbine
- Jelovica
- Kladje
- Kopačnica
- Kremenik
- Krivo Brdo
- Krnice pri Novakih
- Lajše
- Laniše
- Laze
- Leskovica
- Lom nad Volčo
- Lovsko Brdo
- Lučine
- Malenski Vrh
- Mlaka nad Lušo
- Murave
- Nova Oselica
- Podgora
- Podjelovo Brdo
- Podobeno
- Podvrh
- Poljane nad Škofjo Loko
- Predmost
- Prelesje
- Robidnica
- Smoldno
- Sovodenj
- Srednja Vas–Poljane
- Srednje Brdo
- Stara Oselica
- Studor
- Suša
- Todraž
- Trebija
- Vinharje
- Volaka
- Volča
- Žabja Vas
- Zadobje
- Zakobiljek
- Zapreval
- Žirovski Vrh Svetega Antona
- Žirovski Vrh Svetega Urbana

== Notable people ==
Notable people born in the municipality include:

- Anton Ažbe (1862–1905), painter and educator
- Miha Krek (1897–1969), conservative politician
- Ignatius Mrak (1818–1901), Slovenian American Roman Catholic missionary and prelate
- Ivan Tavčar (1851–1923), writer and Liberal politician
- Aleš Ušeničnik (1868–1952), Neo-Thomist philosopher
