= Brebovnica =

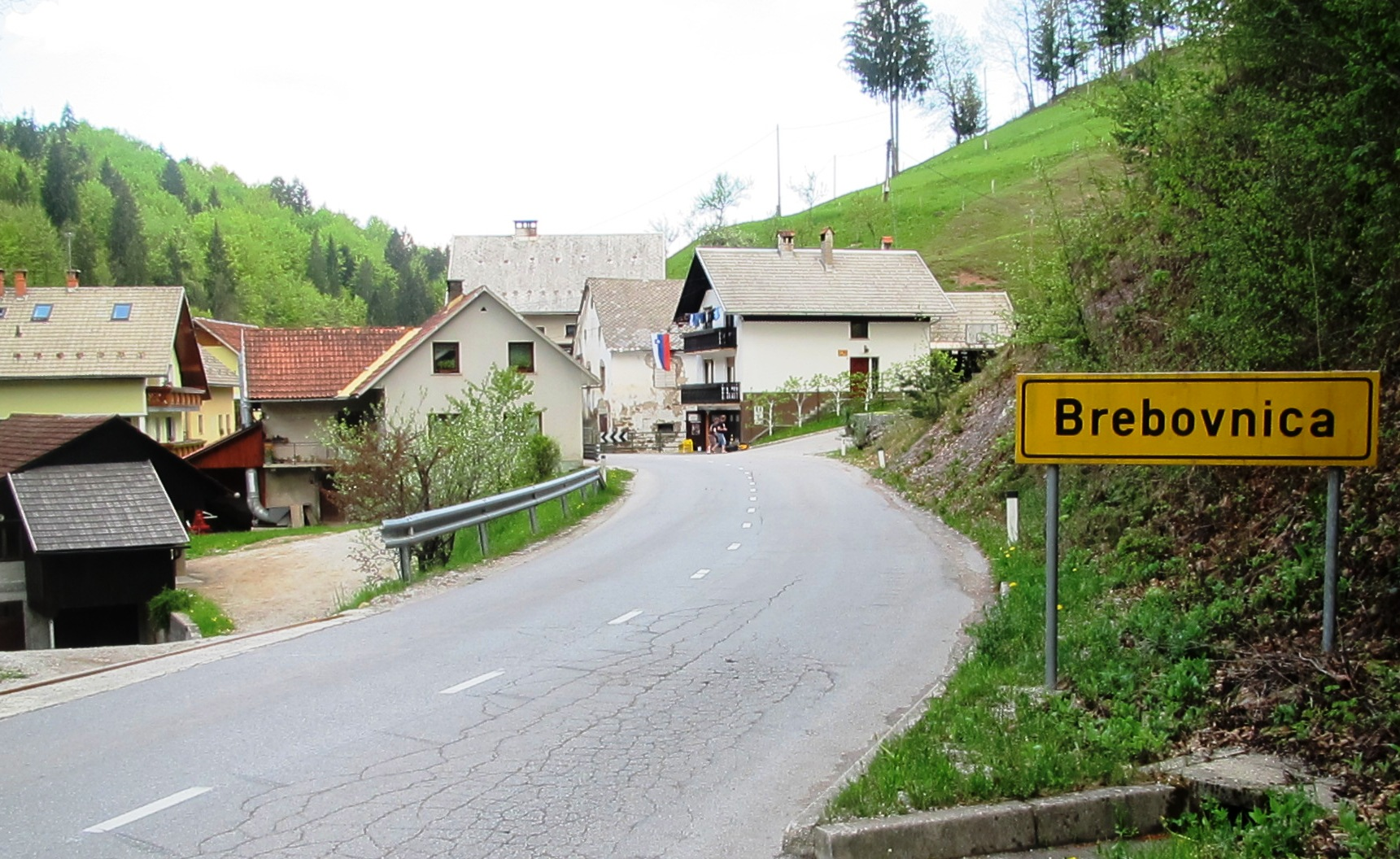
- Brebovnica

- Location in Slovenia
- Coordinates: 46°4′20.4″N 14°10′25.19″E
- Country: Slovenia
- Traditional region: Upper Carniola
- Statistical region: Upper Carniola
- Municipality: Gorenja Vas–Poljane

Area
  - Total: 3.09 km^{2} (1.19 sq mi)
- Elevation: 466.6 m (1,531 ft)

Population (2020)
  - Total: 141
  - Density: 45.6/km^{2} (118/sq mi)

Brebovnica (pronounced [bɾɛˈboːu̯nitsa]) is a dispersed settlement in the Municipality of Gorenja Vas–Poljane in the Upper Carniola region of Slovenia.
