= Vinharje =

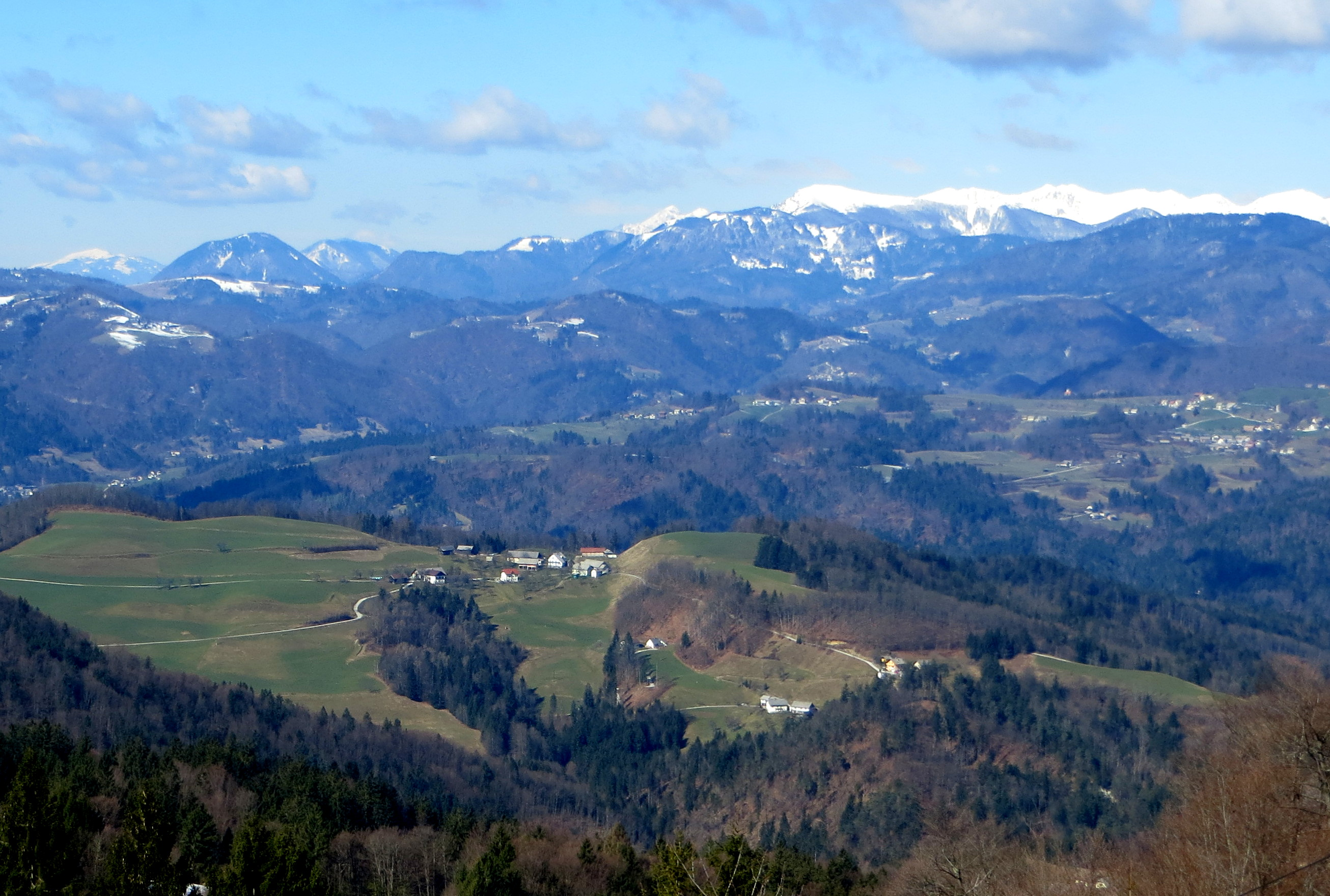

- Location in Slovenia
- Coordinates: 46°6′7.21″N 14°10′59.45″E
- Country: Slovenia
- Traditional region: Upper Carniola
- Statistical region: Upper Carniola
- Municipality: Gorenja Vas–Poljane

Area
  - Total: 1.77 km^{2} (0.68 sq mi)
- Elevation: 661.1 m (2,169 ft)

Population (2020)
  - Total: 61
  - Density: 34/km^{2} (89/sq mi)

Vinharje (pronounced [ˈʋiːŋxaɾjɛ]) is a settlement in the hills south of Poljane nad Škofjo Loko in the Municipality of Gorenja Vas–Poljane in the Upper Carniola region of Slovenia.

== Name ==
Vinharje was attested in historical sources in 1291 as aput Indicherios, in 1318 as aput Inticherios, in 1453 as Indichern, and in 1500 as Inticharen. The name is a fused prepositional phrase, from v 'in' + Inharje. The name is derived from German Innicher 'person from Innichen', borrowed into Slovene as *Inihar (contracted to *Inhar) and referring to colonists from South Tyrol that settled the area.

== History ==
Vinharje was settled by arrivals from Innichen in the Middle Ages.

During the Second World War, the Partisans had a safe house at the Muha farm in the northeastern part of the village. The Don underground printing press was operated by the Partisans at the Muha hay meadow. The safe house was attacked by German forces on January 21, 1942, and the Germans burned the farmhouse and removed the family from the farm. The Partisans also had a bunker in the Jablanovec Gorge north of the Muha farm where, among others, the communist political commissar Maks Krmelj (1910–2004) sheltered.
