= Srednje Brdo =

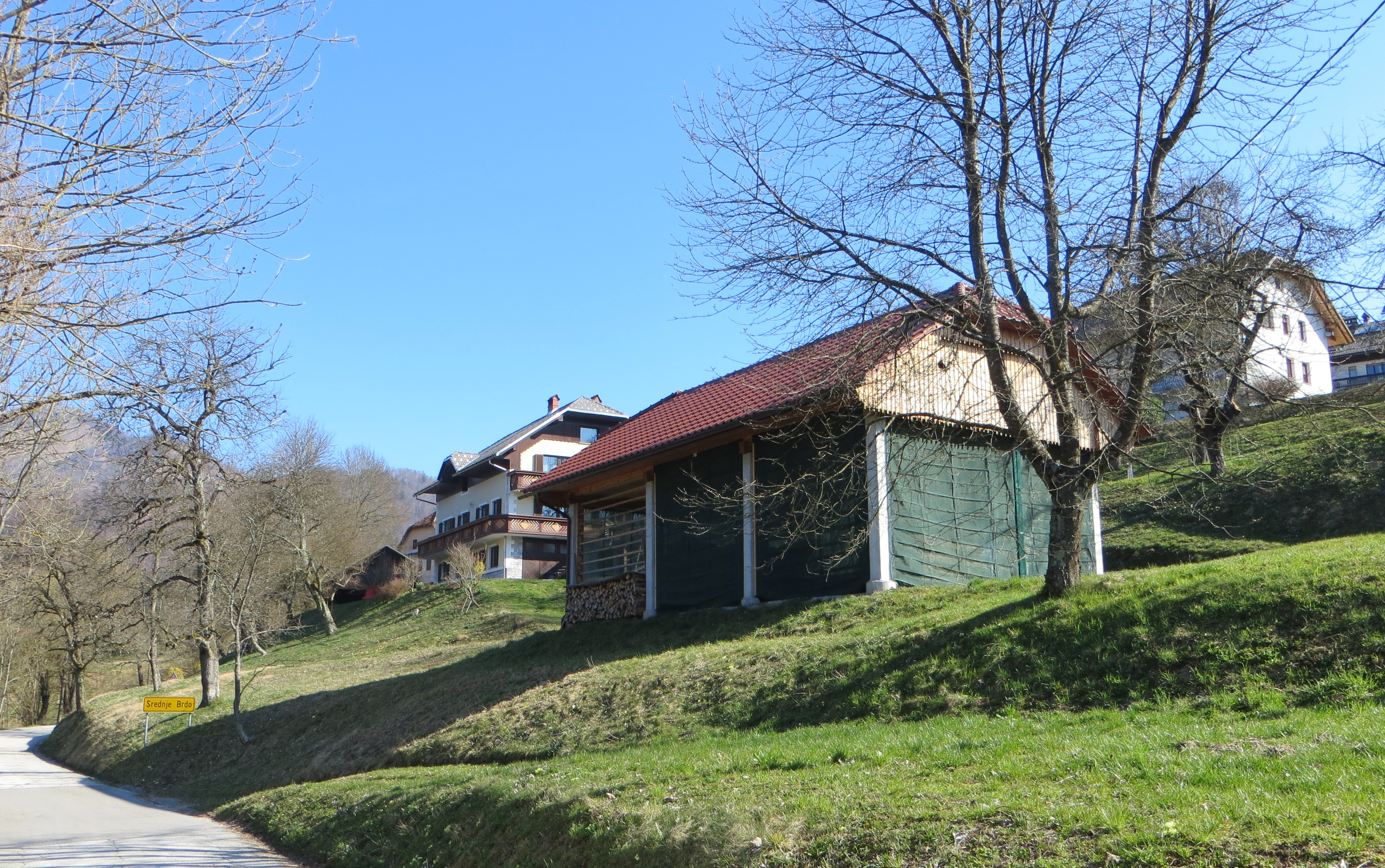

- Location in Slovenia
- Coordinates: 46°7′27.28″N 14°6′45.79″E
- Country: Slovenia
- Traditional region: Upper Carniola
- Statistical region: Upper Carniola
- Municipality: Gorenja Vas–Poljane

Area
  - Total: 2.59 km^{2} (1.00 sq mi)
- Elevation: 520.5 m (1,708 ft)

Population (2020)
  - Total: 113
  - Density: 43.6/km^{2} (113/sq mi)

Srednje Brdo (pronounced [ˈsɾeːdnjɛ ˈbəɾdɔ]) is a settlement north of Hotavlje in the Municipality of Gorenja Vas–Poljane in the Upper Carniola region of Slovenia. It includes the hamlets of Loge and Toplice (German: Töplitz).
