= Sovodenj =

- Village
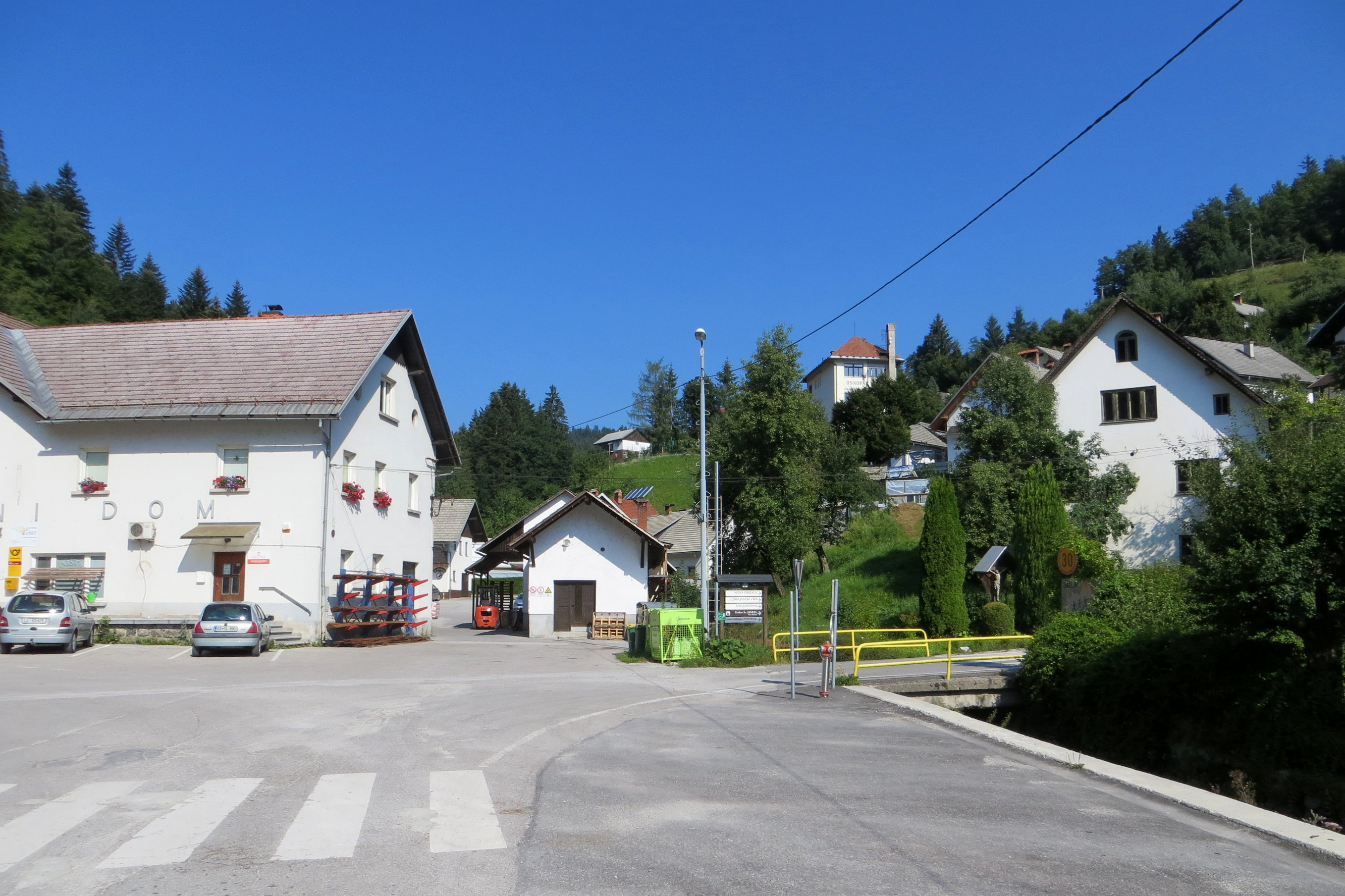

- Location in Slovenia
- Coordinates: 46°5′6.5″N 14°2′20.38″E
- Country: Slovenia
- Traditional region: Upper Carniola
- Statistical region: Upper Carniola
- Municipality: Gorenja Vas–Poljane

Area
  - Total: 1.02 km^{2} (0.39 sq mi)
- Elevation: 577.8 m (1,896 ft)

Population (2020)
  - Total: 169
  - Density: 166/km^{2} (429/sq mi)

Sovodenj (pronounced [sɔˈʋoːdən]) is a village in the Municipality of Gorenja Vas–Poljane in the Upper Carniola region of Slovenia. It lies at the confluence of four streams: the Javorščica, Podosojnica, Podjelovščica, and Zakoparska Grapa. At Sovodenj these form the Hobovščica, a tributary of the Poljane Sora River.
