= Murave =

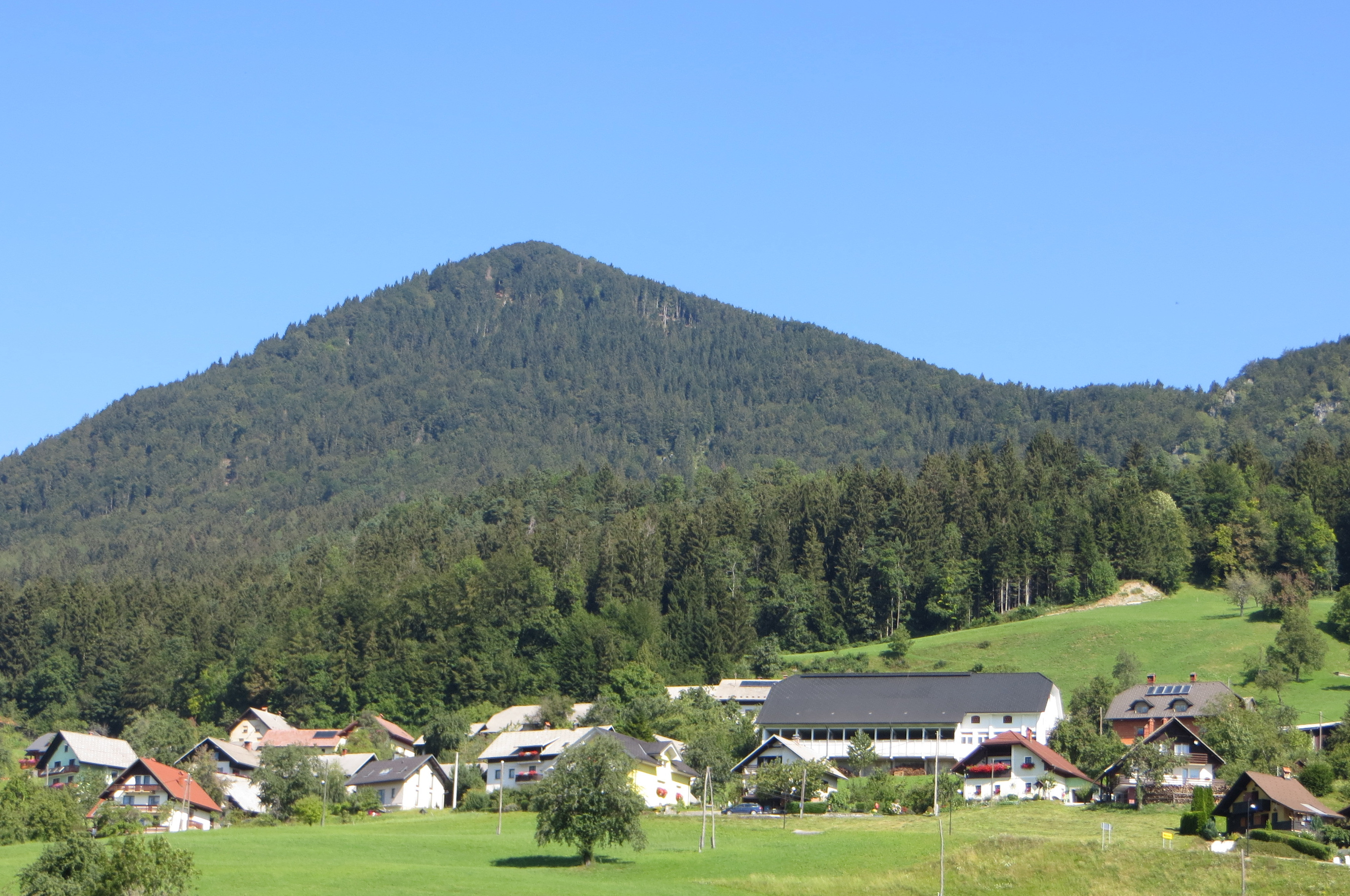

- Location in Slovenia
- Coordinates: 46°9′37.11″N 14°10′22.79″E
- Country: Slovenia
- Traditional region: Upper Carniola
- Statistical region: Upper Carniola
- Municipality: Gorenja Vas–Poljane

Area
  - Total: 0.63 km^{2} (0.24 sq mi)
- Elevation: 770 m (2,530 ft)

Population (2020)
  - Total: 72
  - Density: 110/km^{2} (300/sq mi)

Murave (pronounced [ˈmuːɾaʋɛ]; German: Muraw) is a small settlement in the Municipality of Gorenja Vas–Poljane in the Upper Carniola region of Slovenia. It lies in the Škofja Loka Hills north of Poljane.
