= Predmost =

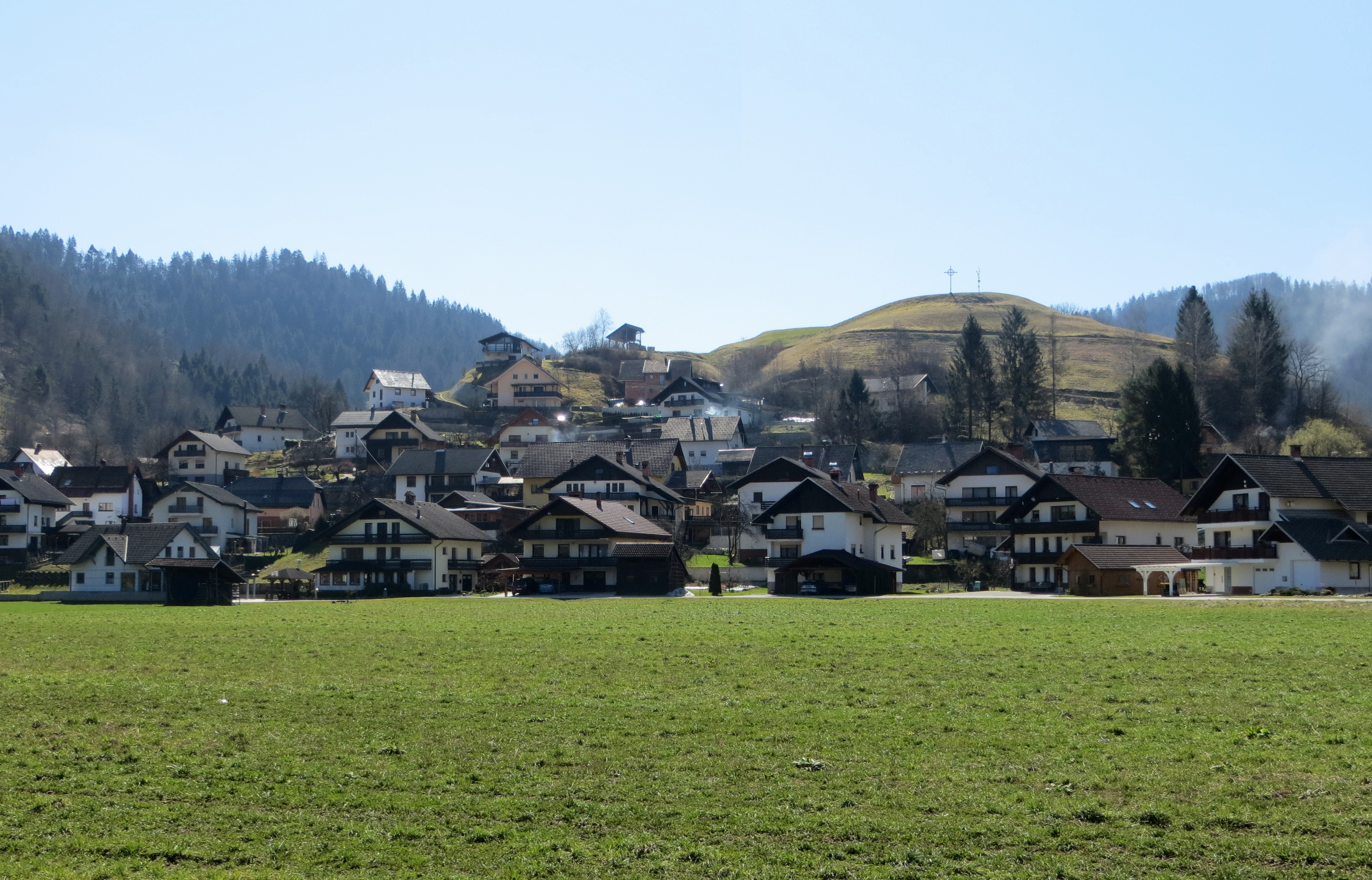

- Location in Slovenia
- Coordinates: 46°7′3.98″N 14°11′10.26″E
- Country: Slovenia
- Traditional region: Upper Carniola
- Statistical region: Upper Carniola
- Municipality: Gorenja Vas–Poljane

Area
  - Total: 1.69 km^{2} (0.65 sq mi)
- Elevation: 391.3 m (1,284 ft)

Population (2020)
  - Total: 138
  - Density: 81.7/km^{2} (211/sq mi)

Predmost (pronounced [pɾɛdˈmoːst]) is a settlement on the right bank of the Poljane Sora River, located next to Poljane in the Municipality of Gorenja Vas–Poljane in the Upper Carniola region of Slovenia.
