= Jazbine, Gorenja Vas–Poljane =

Jazbine
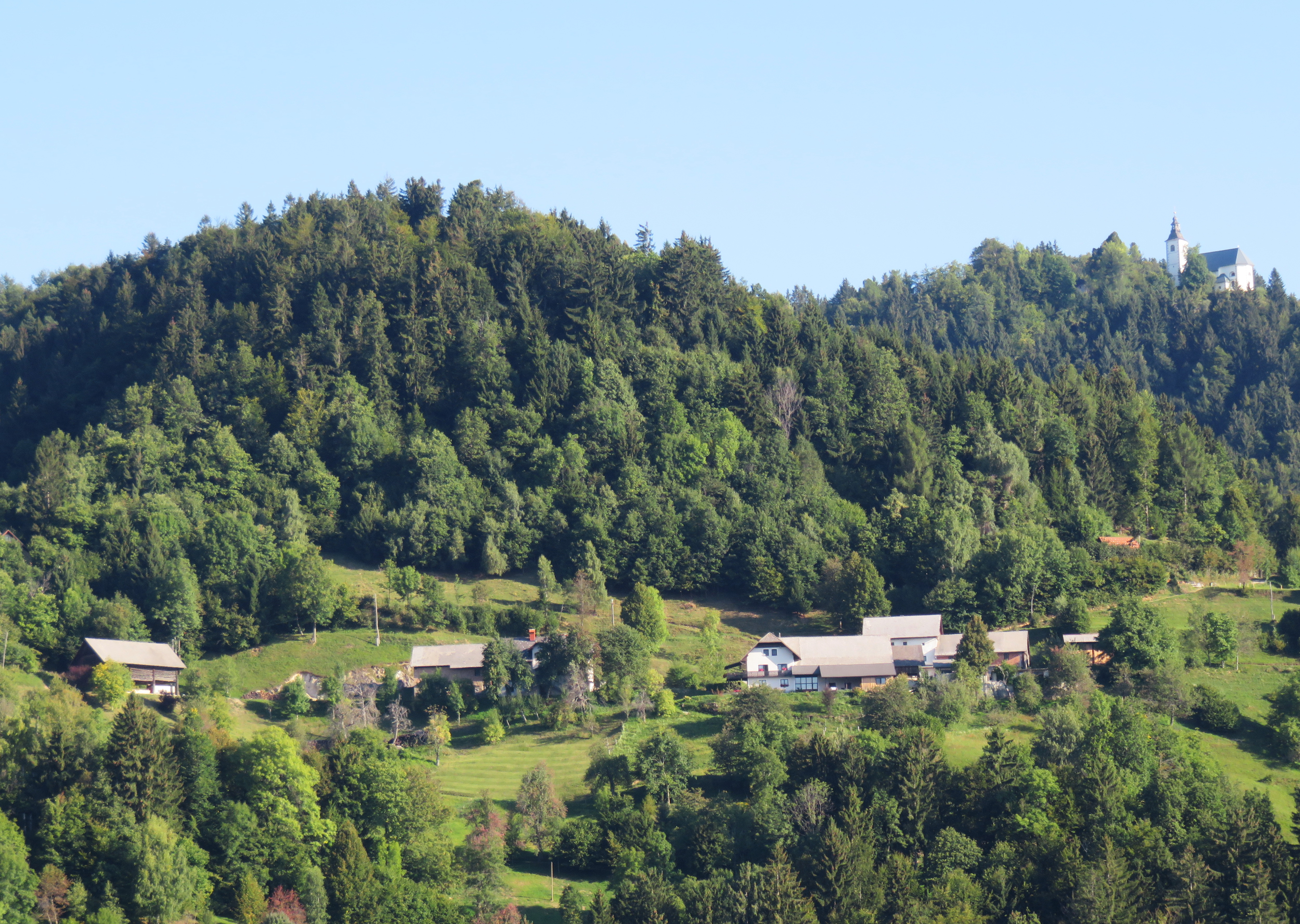

- Location in Slovenia
- Coordinates: 46°8′45.15″N 14°9′12.27″E
- Country: Slovenia
- Traditional region: Upper Carniola
- Statistical region: Upper Carniola
- Municipality: Gorenja Vas–Poljane

Area
  - Total: 1.19 km^{2} (0.46 sq mi)
- Elevation: 760.8 m (2,496 ft)

Population (2020)
  - Total: 15
  - Density: 13/km^{2} (33/sq mi)

Jazbine (pronounced [ˈjaːzbinɛ]) is a dispersed settlement in the Municipality of Gorenja Vas–Poljane in the Upper Carniola region of Slovenia.

== Church ==
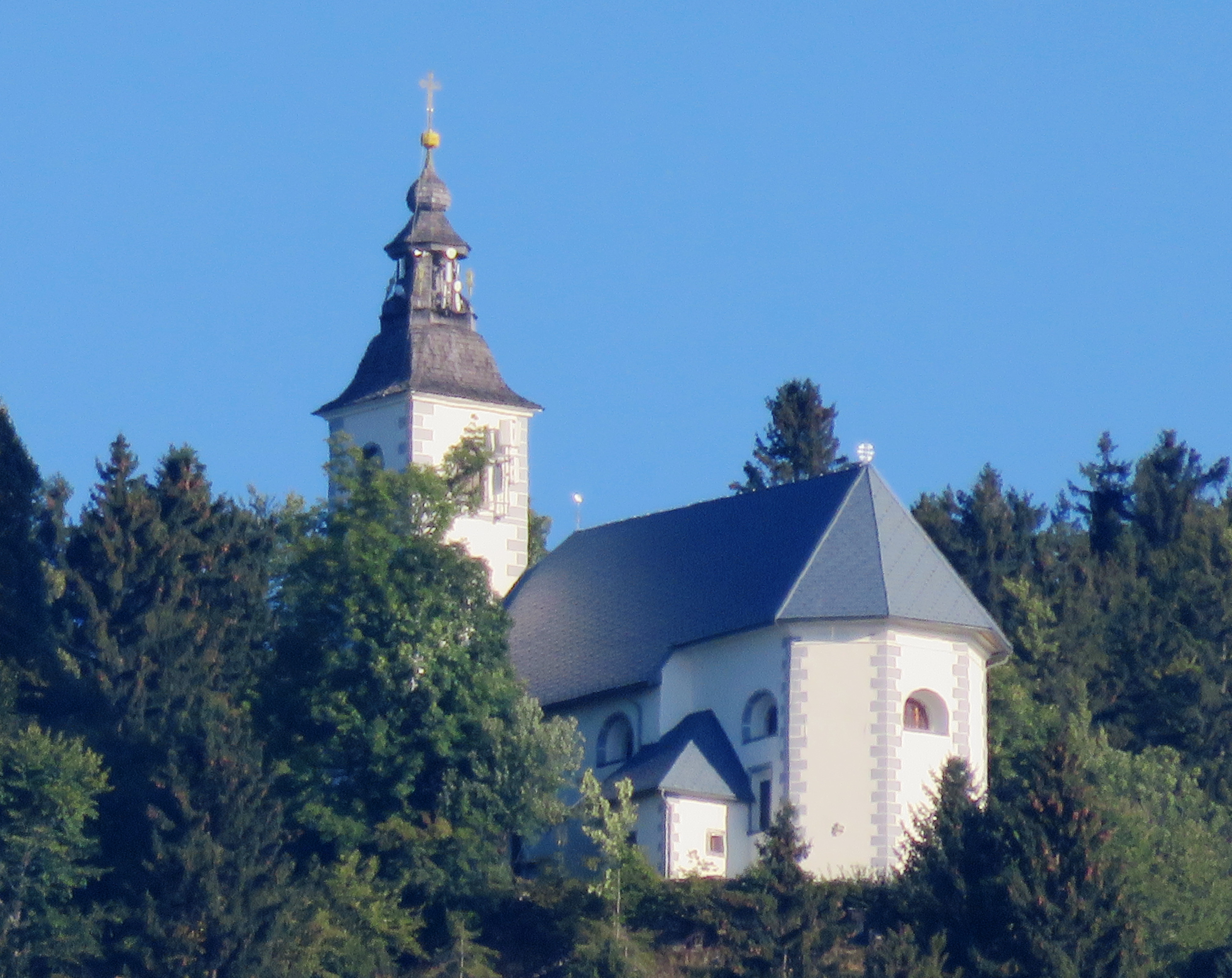
Assumption Church

The local church, built below the peak called Malenski vrh (literally, 'Mill Peak', from maln 'mill'), also serves the settlement of Malenski Vrh and is dedicated to the Assumption of Mary (Slovene: Marijino vnebovzetje). It was built between 1703 and 1705 on the site of an earlier church. The main altar dates to 1717.

== Notable people ==
Notable people that were born or lived in Jazbine include:

- Tone Demšar (1902–1942), Partisan and commandant of the Škofja Loka Company
