= Krivo Brdo =

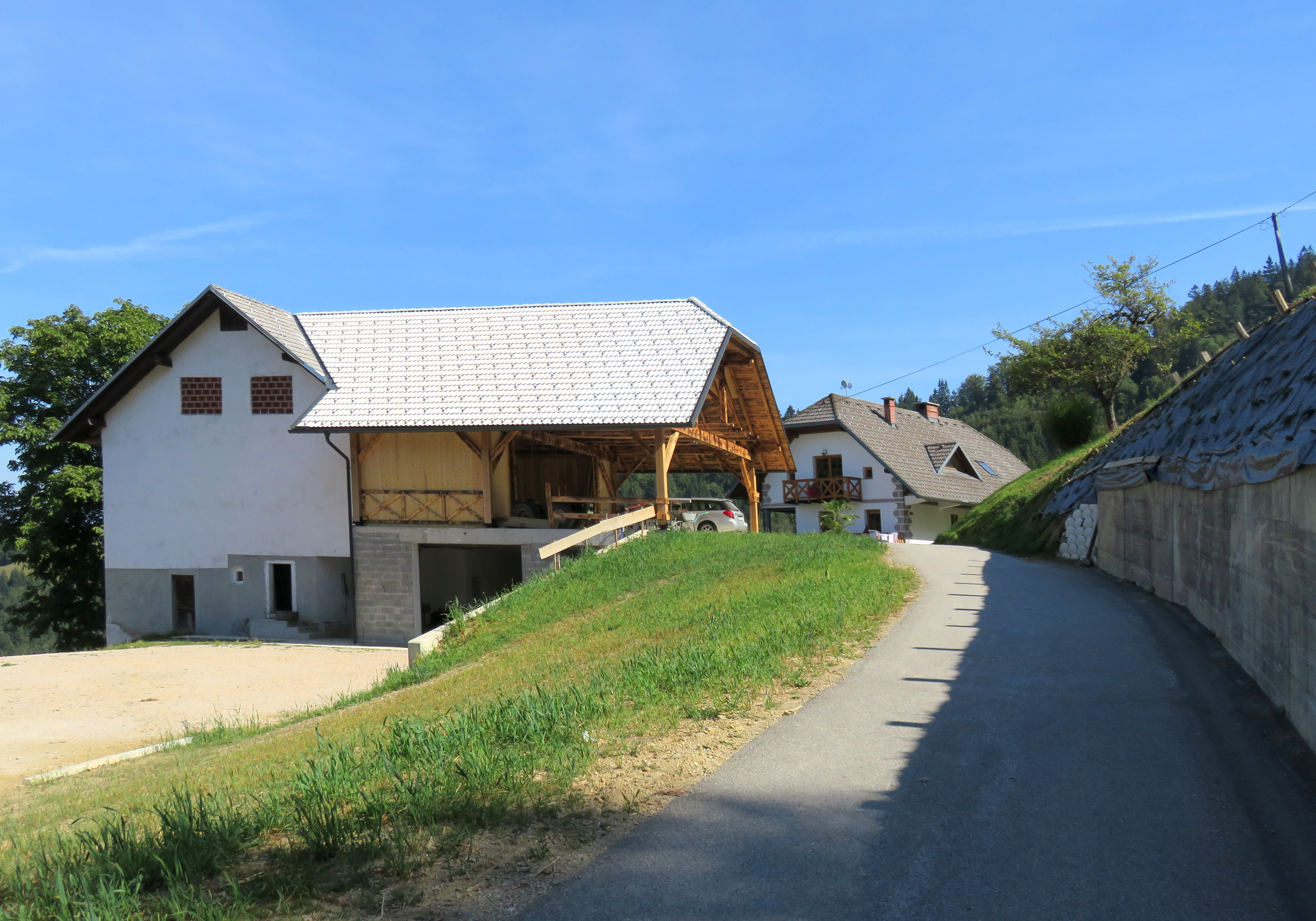

- Location in Slovenia
- Coordinates: 46°10′12.77″N 14°13′23.62″E
- Country: Slovenia
- Traditional region: Upper Carniola
- Statistical region: Upper Carniola
- Municipality: Gorenja Vas–Poljane

Area
  - Total: 0.51 km^{2} (0.20 sq mi)
- Elevation: 620.7 m (2,036 ft)

Population (2020)
  - Total: 7
  - Density: 14/km^{2} (36/sq mi)

Krivo Brdo (pronounced [ˈkɾiːʋɔ ˈbəɾdɔ]; German: Kriv) is a small settlement in the hills between the valleys of the Poljane Sora and Selca Sora rivers in the Upper Carniola region of Slovenia. It lies in the Municipality of Gorenja Vas–Poljane.
