= Kladje, Gorenja Vas–Poljane =

Kladje
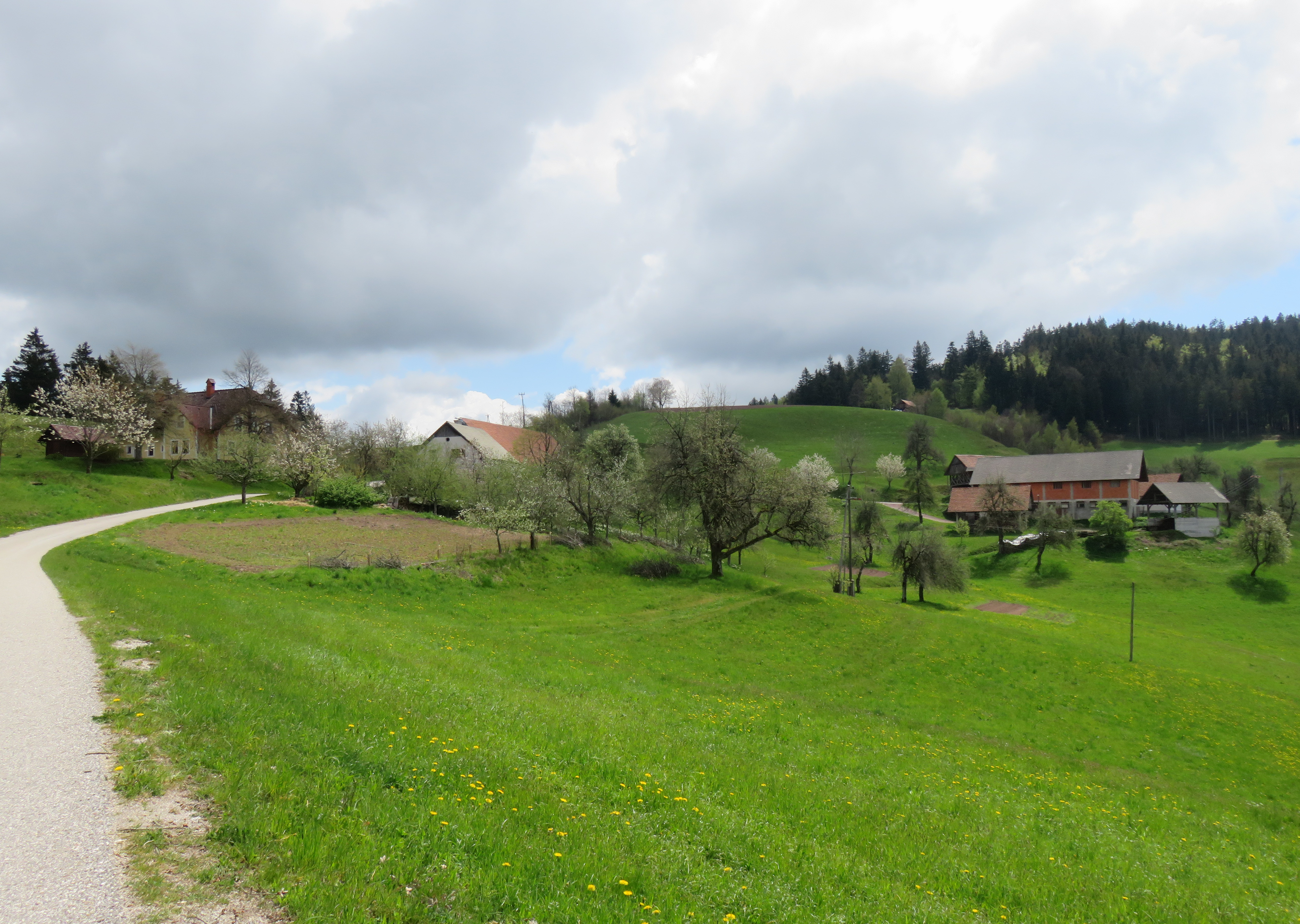

- Location in Slovenia
- Coordinates: 46°5′1.17″N 14°6′43″E
- Country: Slovenia
- Traditional region: Upper Carniola
- Statistical region: Upper Carniola
- Municipality: Gorenja Vas–Poljane

Area
  - Total: 3.03 km^{2} (1.17 sq mi)
- Elevation: 774 m (2,539 ft)

Population (2020)
  - Total: 57
  - Density: 19/km^{2} (49/sq mi)

Kladje (pronounced [ˈklaːdjɛ]) is a dispersed settlement at an elevation of 787 meters above sea level above the right bank of the upper course of the Poljane Sora River in the Municipality of Gorenja Vas–Poljane in the Upper Carniola region of Slovenia.
