= Studor, Gorenja Vas–Poljane =

Studor
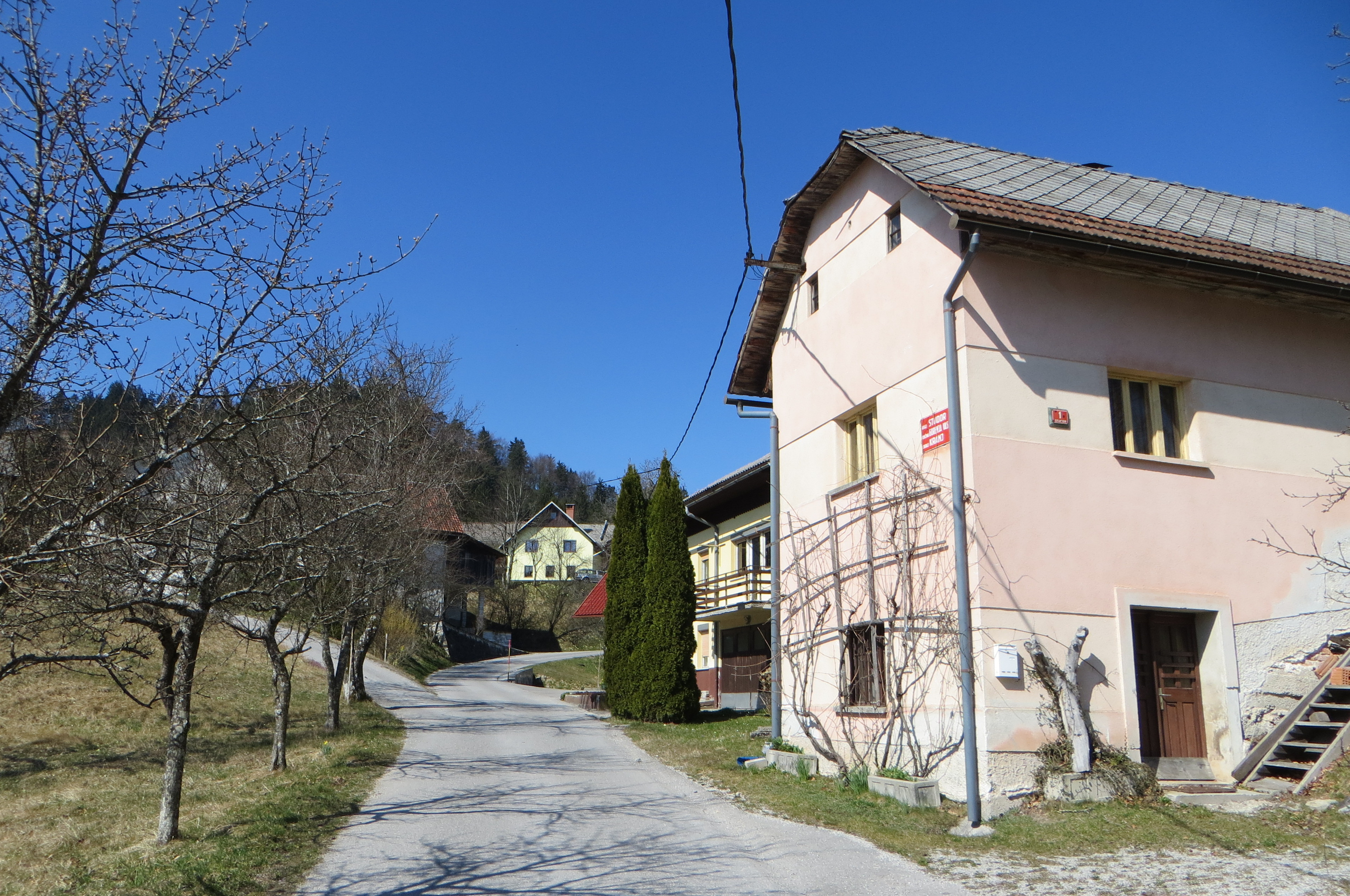

- Location in Slovenia
- Coordinates: 46°08′11″N 14°05′34″E
- Country: Slovenia
- Traditional region: Upper Carniola
- Statistical region: Upper Carniola
- Municipality: Gorenja Vas–Poljane

Area
  - Total: 1.4 km^{2} (0.54 sq mi)
- Elevation: 729.7 m (2,394 ft)

Population (2020)
  - Total: 25
  - Density: 18/km^{2} (46/sq mi)

Studor (pronounced [ˈstuːdɔɾ]) is a small settlement in the hills northwest of Gorenja Vas in the Municipality of Gorenja Vas–Poljane in the Upper Carniola region of Slovenia.
