= Dobravšce =

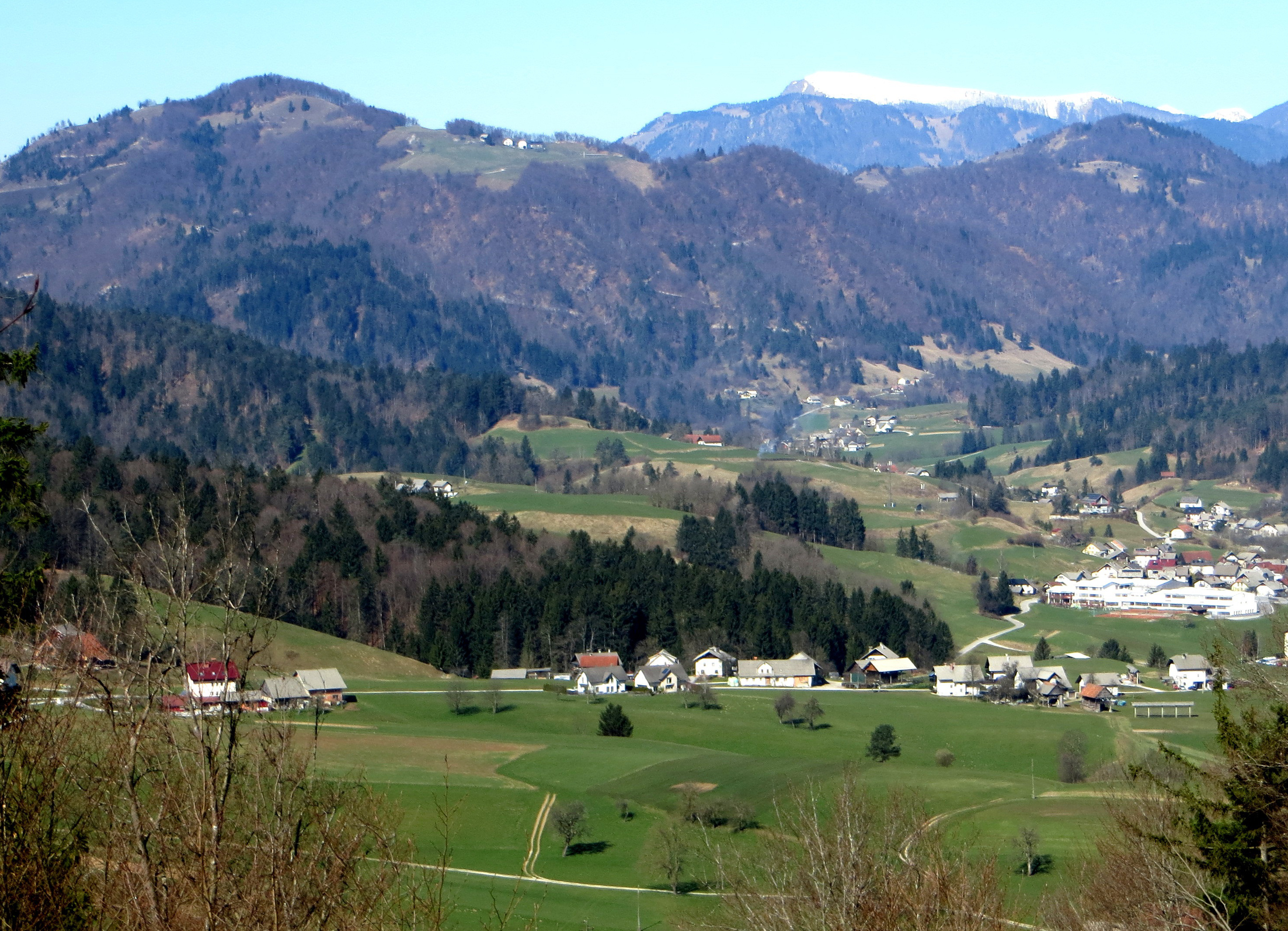

- Location in Slovenia
- Coordinates: 46°5′32.55″N 14°8′44.95″E
- Country: Slovenia
- Traditional region: Upper Carniola
- Statistical region: Upper Carniola
- Municipality: Gorenja Vas–Poljane

Area
  - Total: 0.60 km^{2} (0.23 sq mi)
- Elevation: 463.5 m (1,521 ft)

Population (2020)
  - Total: 98
  - Density: 160/km^{2} (420/sq mi)

Dobravšce (pronounced [dɔˈbɾaːu̯ʃtsɛ]) is a small dispersed settlement south of Gorenja Vas in the Municipality of Gorenja Vas–Poljane in the Upper Carniola region of Slovenia.
