= Dolenje Brdo =

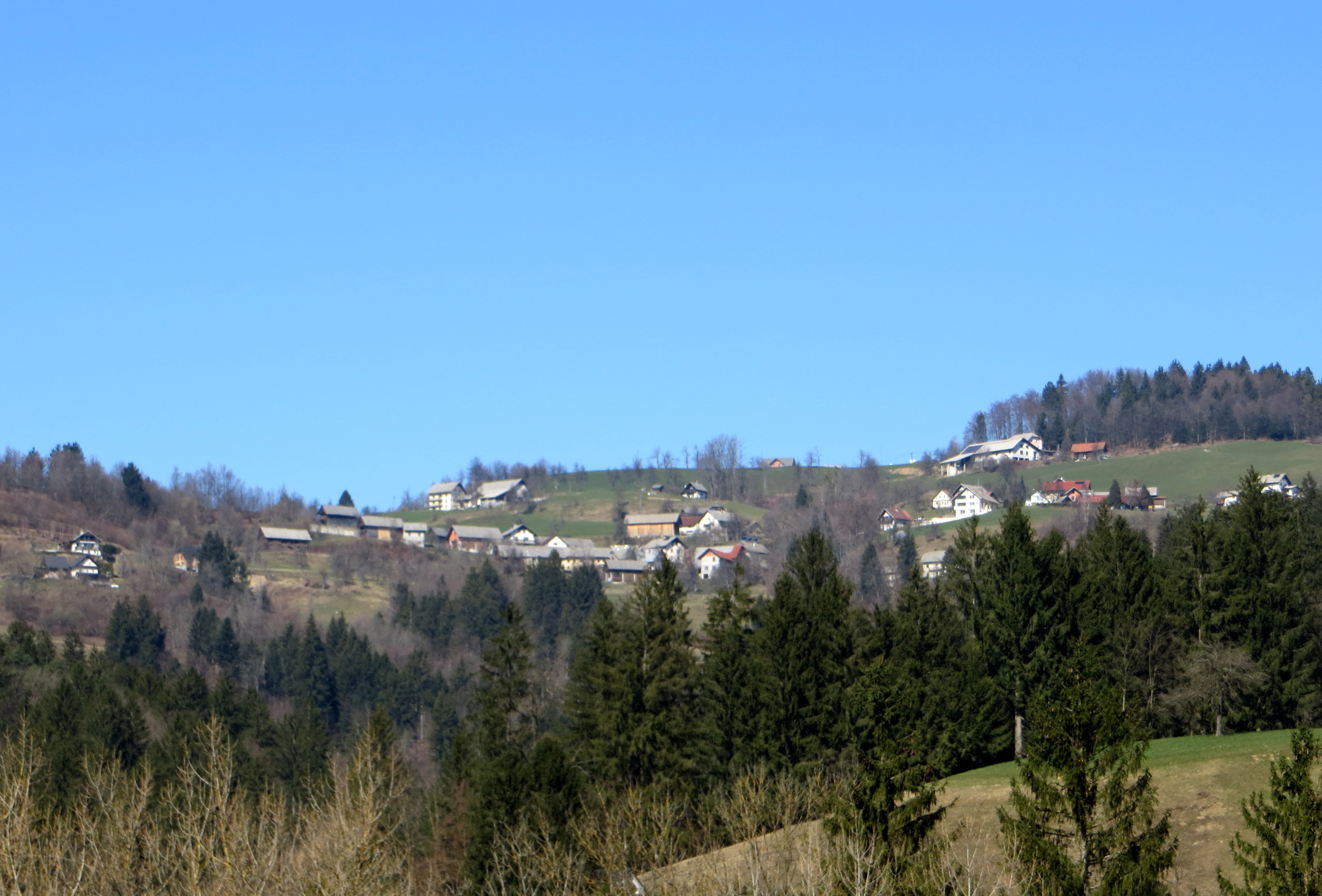

- Location in Slovenia
- Coordinates: 46°7′30.54″N 14°8′57.1″E
- Country: Slovenia
- Traditional region: Upper Carniola
- Statistical region: Upper Carniola
- Municipality: Gorenja Vas–Poljane

Area
  - Total: 1.78 km^{2} (0.69 sq mi)
- Elevation: 628.7 m (2,063 ft)

Population (2020)
  - Total: 83
  - Density: 47/km^{2} (120/sq mi)

Dolenje Brdo (pronounced [dɔˈleːnje ˈbəɾdɔ]; German: Dolenwerd) is a small settlement in the hills west of Poljane in the Municipality of Gorenja Vas–Poljane in the Upper Carniola region of Slovenia.
