= Lajše, Gorenja Vas–Poljane =

Lajše
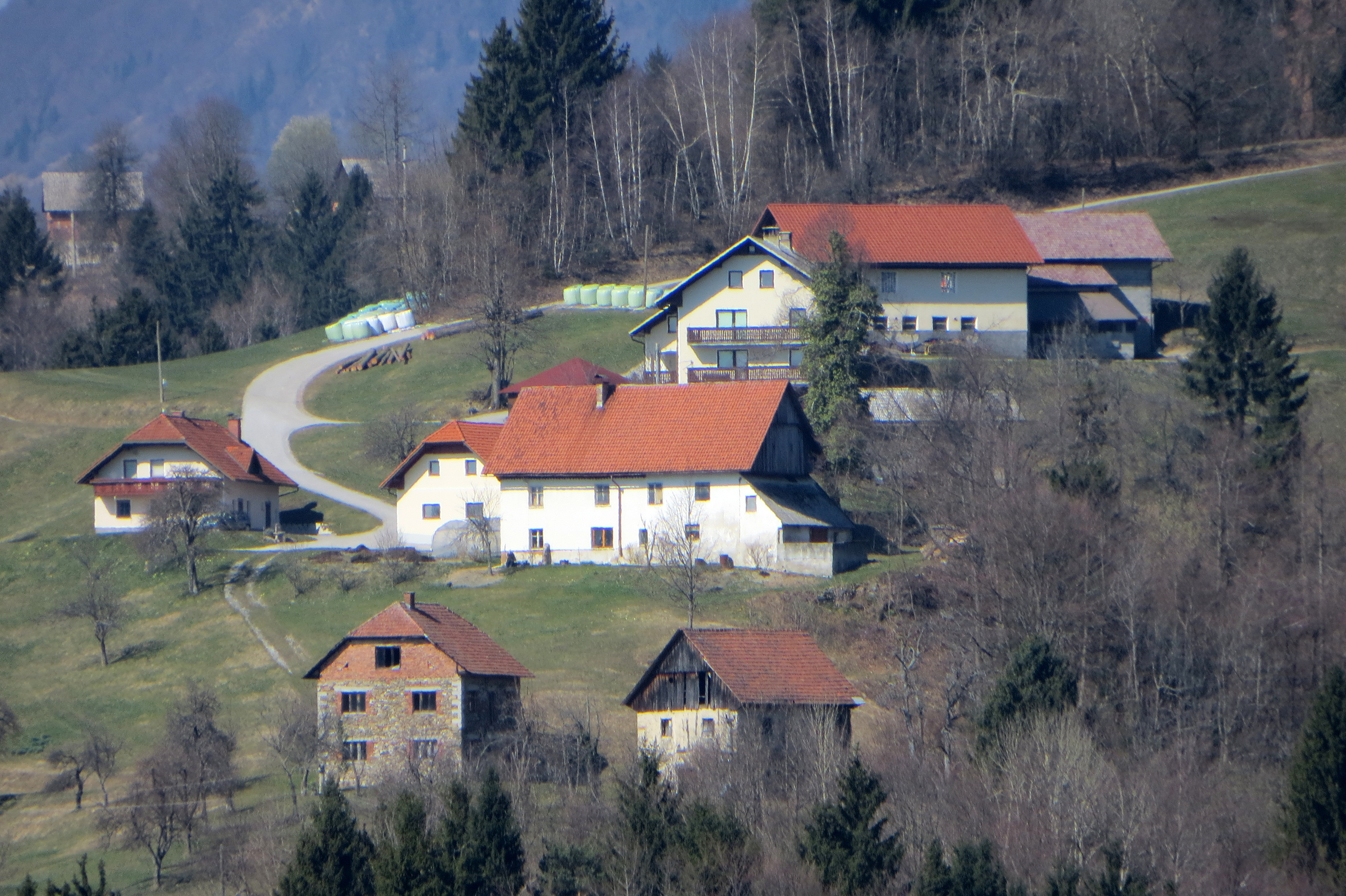

- Location in Slovenia
- Coordinates: 46°8′38.71″N 14°4′23.91″E
- Country: Slovenia
- Traditional region: Upper Carniola
- Statistical region: Upper Carniola
- Municipality: Gorenja Vas–Poljane

Area
  - Total: 0.31 km^{2} (0.12 sq mi)
- Elevation: 773.1 m (2,536 ft)

Population (2020)
  - Total: 11
  - Density: 35/km^{2} (92/sq mi)

Lajše (pronounced [ˈlaːi̯ʃɛ]) is a small settlement in the Municipality of Gorenja Vas–Poljane in the Upper Carniola region of Slovenia.
