= Debeni =

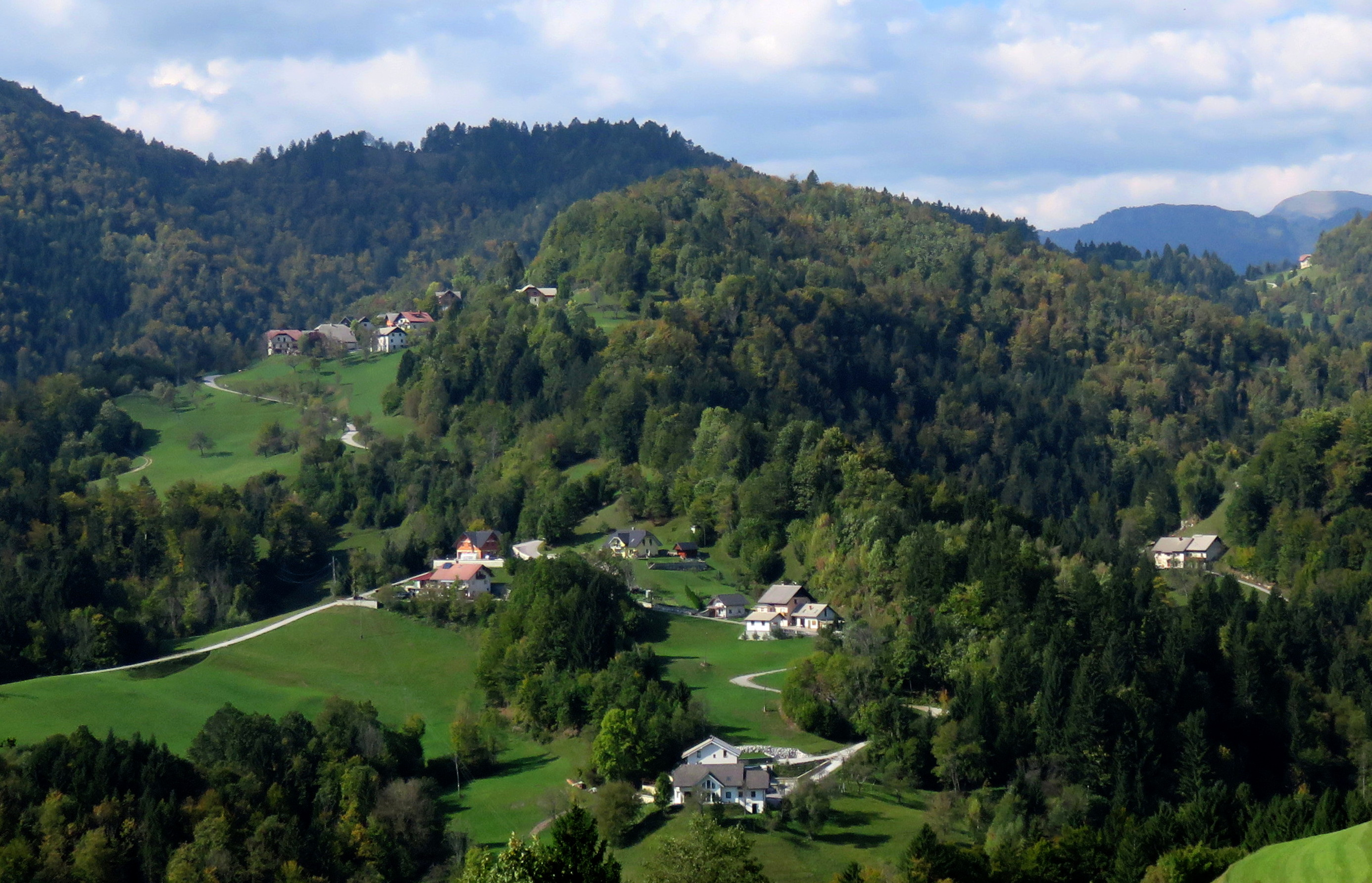

- Location in Slovenia
- Coordinates: 46°8′2.53″N 14°5′57.7″E
- Country: Slovenia
- Traditional region: Upper Carniola
- Statistical region: Upper Carniola
- Municipality: Gorenja Vas–Poljane

Area
  - Total: 0.88 km^{2} (0.34 sq mi)
- Elevation: 680.5 m (2,233 ft)

Population (2020)
  - Total: 40
  - Density: 45/km^{2} (120/sq mi)

Debeni (pronounced [dɛbɛˈniː]; in older sources also V Debenih, German: Udebenich) is a small settlement in the Municipality of Gorenja Vas–Poljane in the Upper Carniola region of Slovenia.
