= Trebija =

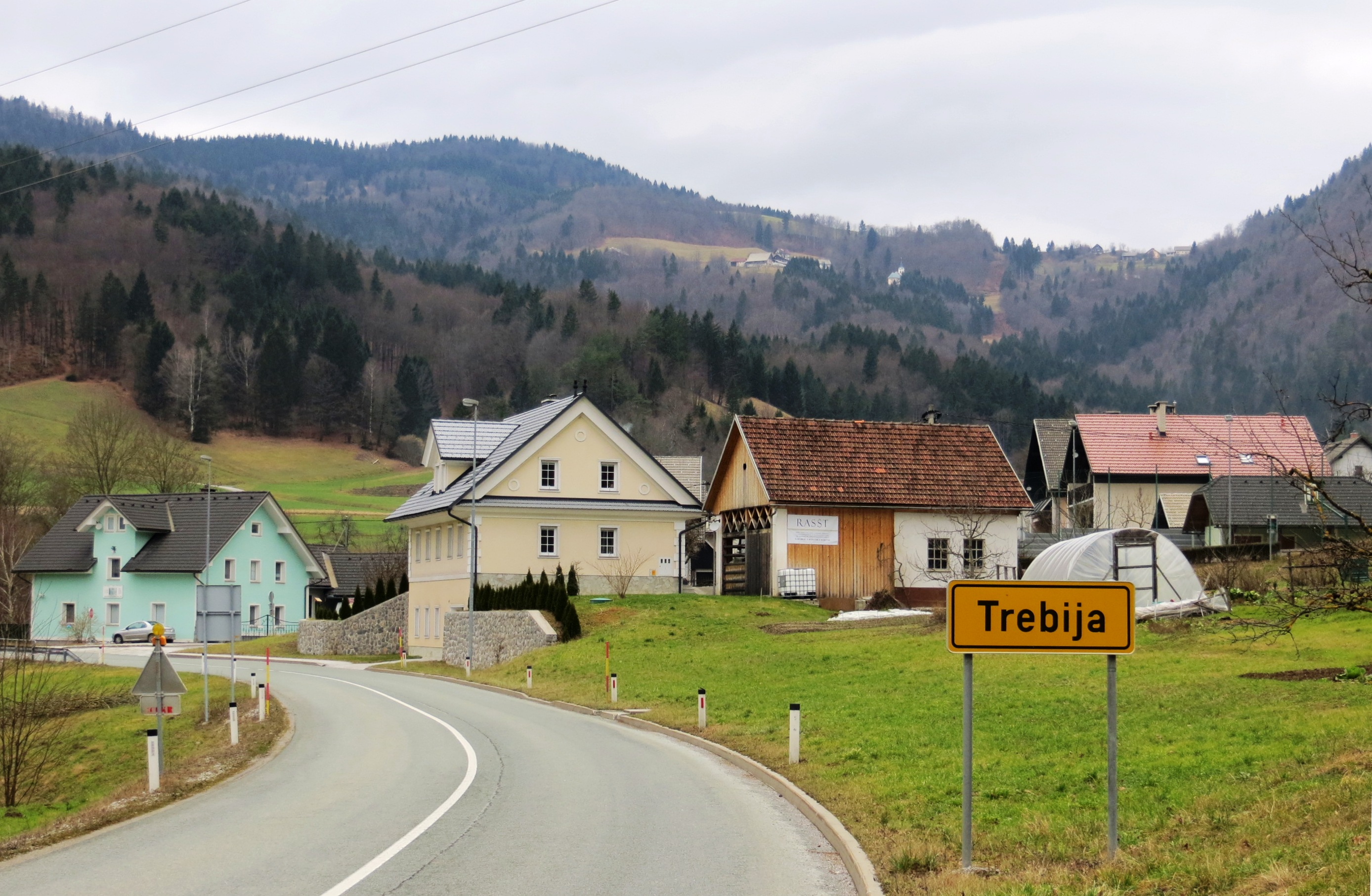

- Location in Slovenia
- Coordinates: 46°5′49.47″N 14°6′6.38″E
- Country: Slovenia
- Traditional region: Upper Carniola
- Statistical region: Upper Carniola
- Municipality: Gorenja Vas–Poljane

Area
  - Total: 2.1 km^{2} (0.81 sq mi)
- Elevation: 434.5 m (1,426 ft)

Population (2020)
  - Total: 208
  - Density: 99/km^{2} (260/sq mi)

Trebija (pronounced [tɾeˈbiːja]; in older sources also Terbija, German: Terbia) is a settlement in the Municipality of Gorenja Vas–Poljane in the Upper Carniola region of Slovenia. It lies on the left bank of the upper course of the Poljane Sora River.
