= Podjelovo Brdo =

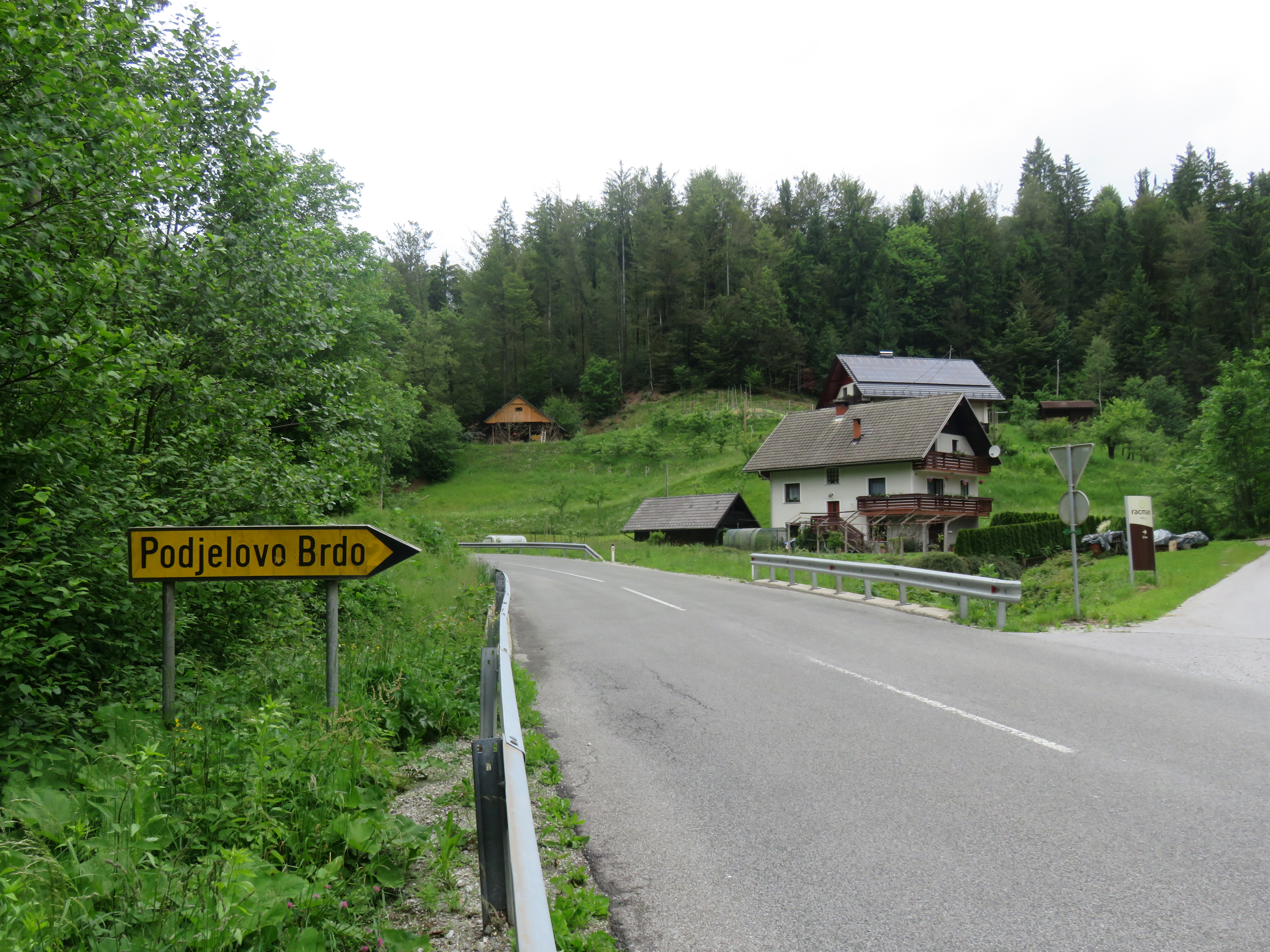

- Location in Slovenia
- Coordinates: 46°06′08″N 14°02′22″E
- Country: Slovenia
- Traditional region: Upper Carniola
- Statistical region: Upper Carniola
- Municipality: Gorenja Vas–Poljane

Area
  - Total: 4.35 km^{2} (1.68 sq mi)
- Elevation: 813.1 m (2,668 ft)

Population (2020)
  - Total: 154
  - Density: 35.4/km^{2} (91.7/sq mi)

Podjelovo Brdo (pronounced [pɔˈdjeːlɔʋɔ ˈbəɾdɔ]; German: Podjelowoberdo) is a dispersed settlement in the Škofja Loka Hills, west of Gorenja Vas, in the Municipality of Gorenja Vas–Poljane in the Upper Carniola region of Slovenia.
