= Smoldno =

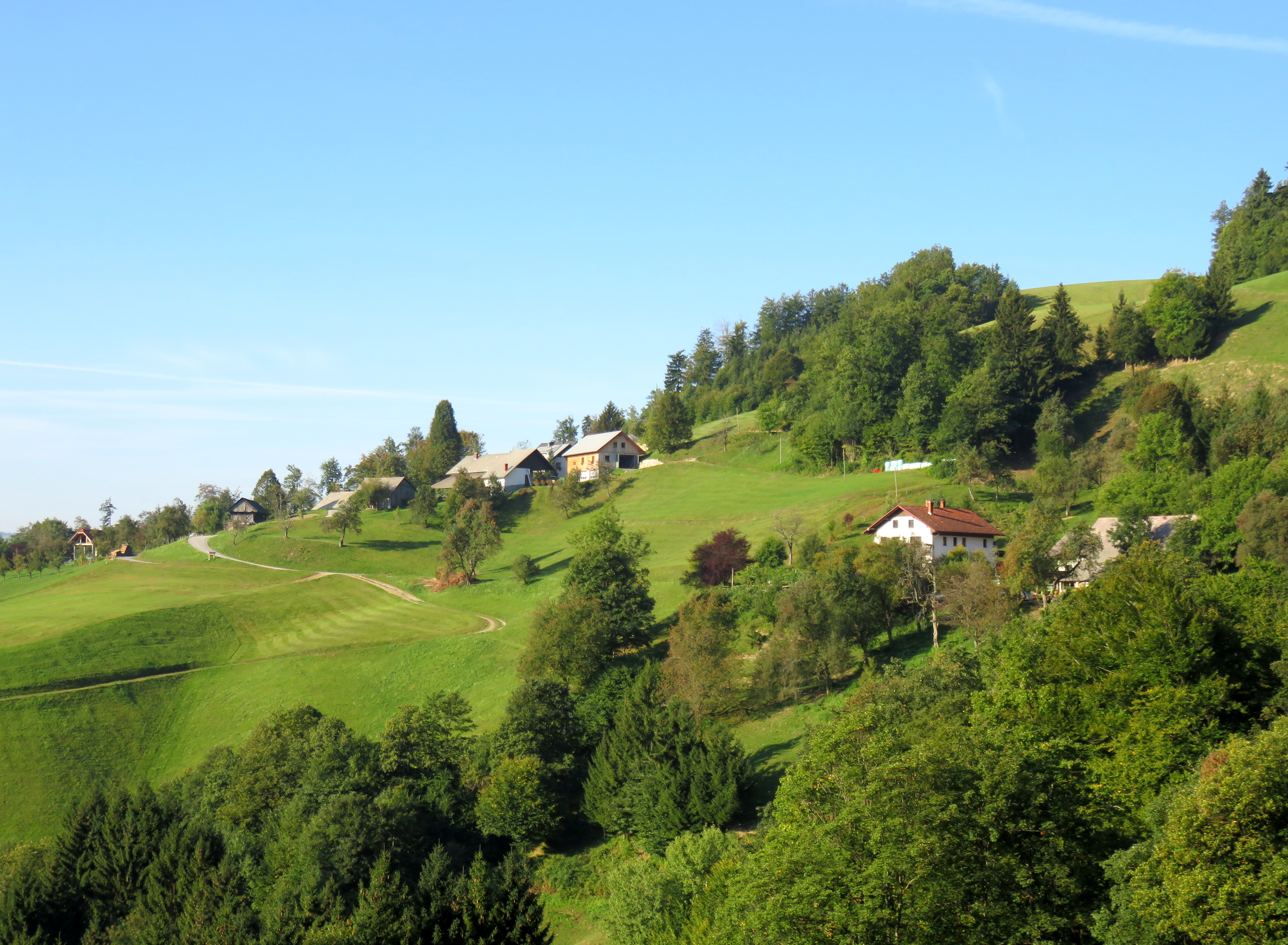

- Location in Slovenia
- Coordinates: 46°8′13.92″N 14°11′53.49″E
- Country: Slovenia
- Traditional region: Upper Carniola
- Statistical region: Upper Carniola
- Municipality: Gorenja Vas–Poljane

Area
  - Total: 1.39 km^{2} (0.54 sq mi)
- Elevation: 662.3 m (2,173 ft)

Population (2020)
  - Total: 35
  - Density: 25/km^{2} (65/sq mi)

Smoldno (pronounced [ˈsmoːu̯dnɔ]; German: Smoldnim) is a small settlement in the hills northeast of Poljane nad Škofjo Loko in the Municipality of Gorenja Vas–Poljane in the Upper Carniola region of Slovenia.
