= Lom nad Volčo =

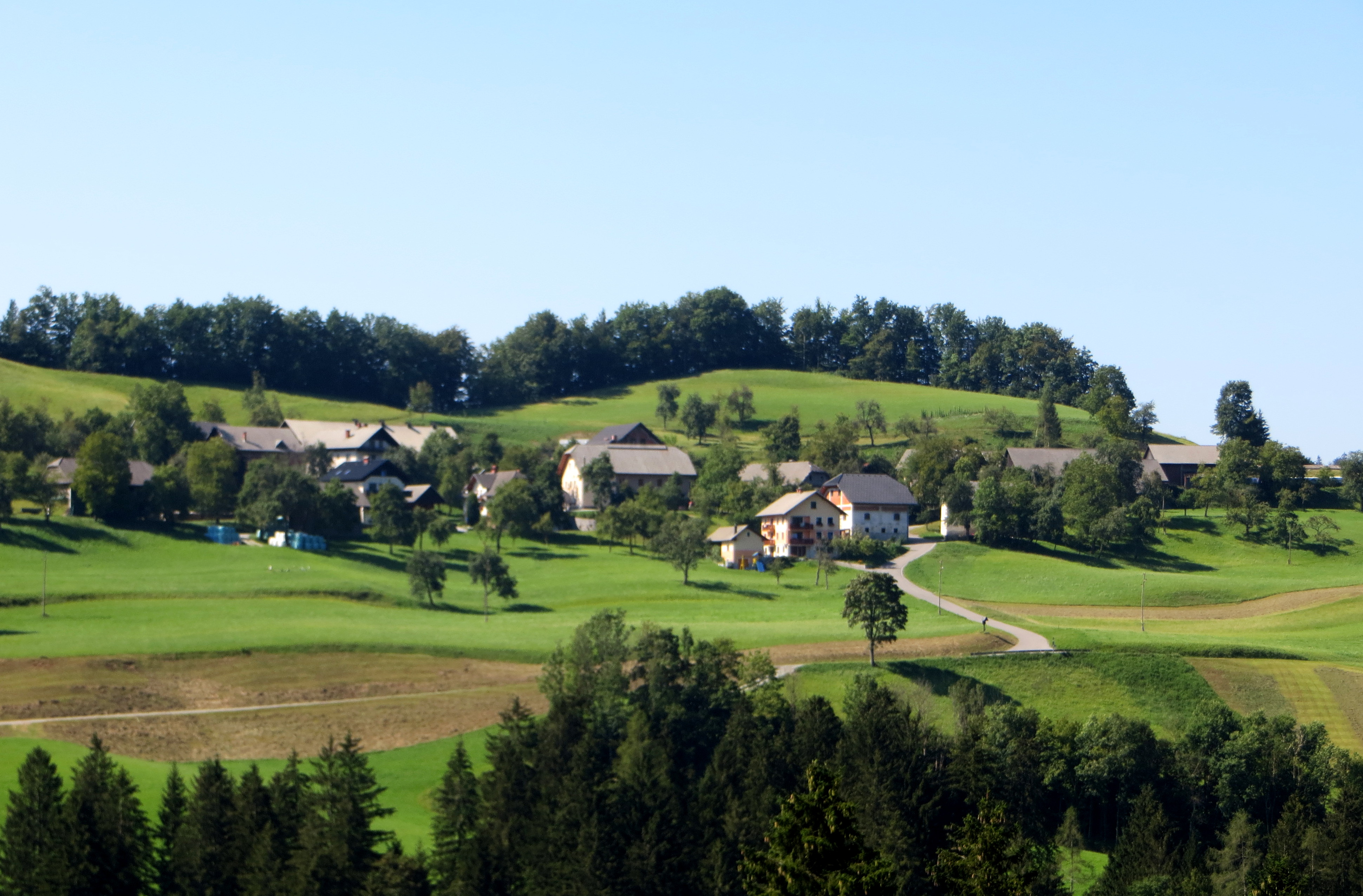

- Location in Slovenia
- Coordinates: 46°8′35.28″N 14°10′19.99″E
- Country: Slovenia
- Traditional region: Upper Carniola
- Statistical region: Upper Carniola
- Municipality: Gorenja Vas–Poljane

Area
  - Total: 1.08 km^{2} (0.42 sq mi)
- Elevation: 592.7 m (1,945 ft)

Population (2020)
  - Total: 51
  - Density: 47/km^{2} (120/sq mi)

Lom nad Volčo (pronounced [ˈlɔm nad ˈʋɔːu̯tʃɔ]) is a small settlement above Volča in the Municipality of Gorenja Vas–Poljane in the Upper Carniola region of Slovenia.

== Name ==
The name of the settlement was changed from Lom to Lom nad Volčo in 1953.
