= Podobeno =

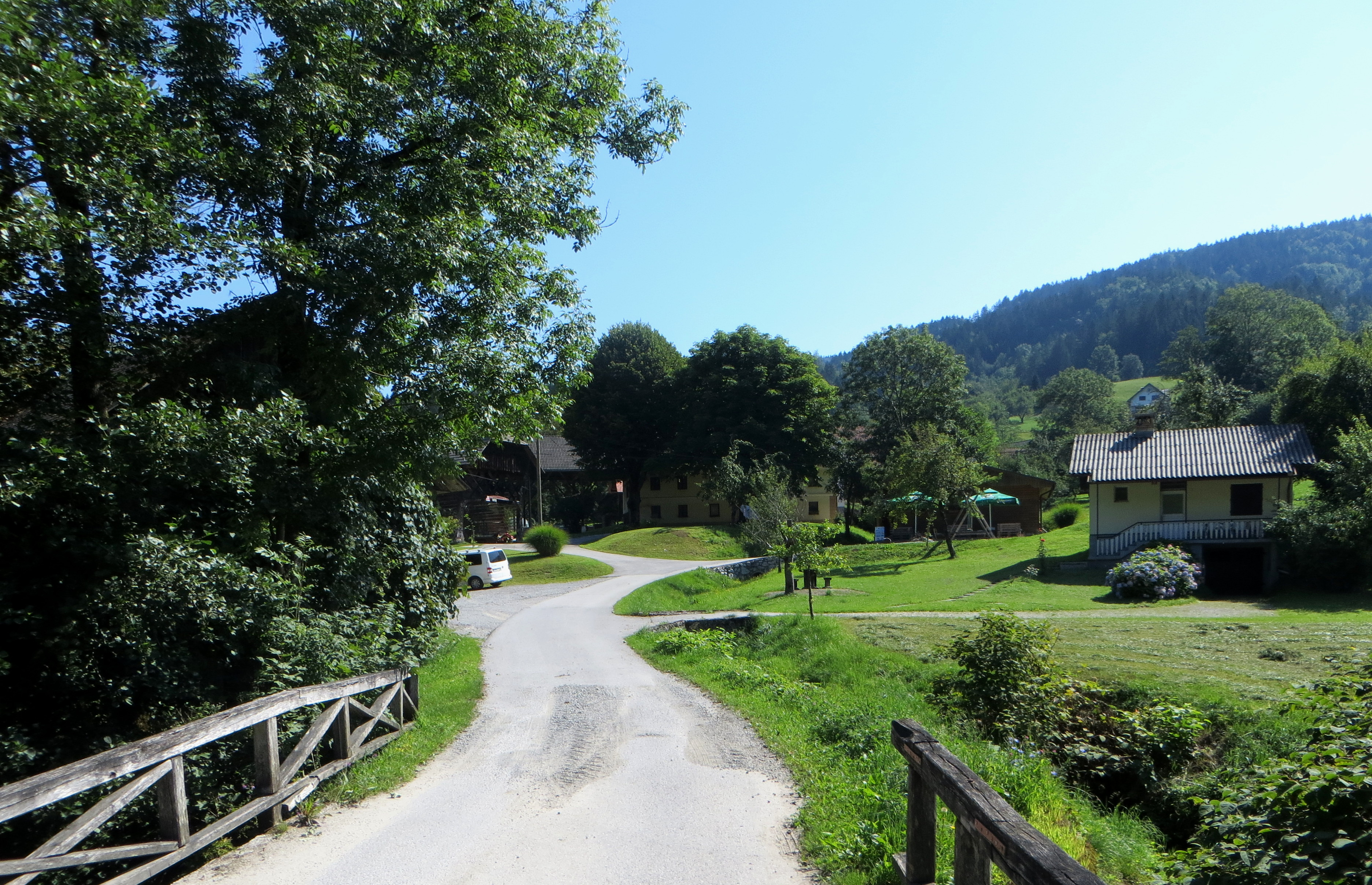

- Location in Slovenia
- Coordinates: 46°8′40.14″N 14°11′5.58″E
- Country: Slovenia
- Traditional region: Upper Carniola
- Statistical region: Upper Carniola
- Municipality: Gorenja Vas–Poljane

Area
  - Total: 1.28 km^{2} (0.49 sq mi)
- Elevation: 431.1 m (1,414 ft)

Population (2020)
  - Total: 60
  - Density: 47/km^{2} (120/sq mi)

Podobeno (pronounced [pɔdɔˈbɛːnɔ] or [pɔdɔˈbeːnɔ]) is a settlement north of Poljane nad Škofjo Loko in the Municipality of Gorenja Vas–Poljane in the Upper Carniola region of Slovenia.

== Notable people ==
Notable people that were born or lived in Podobeno include:

- Anton Kržišnik (1890–1973), judge and politician
