= Bačne =

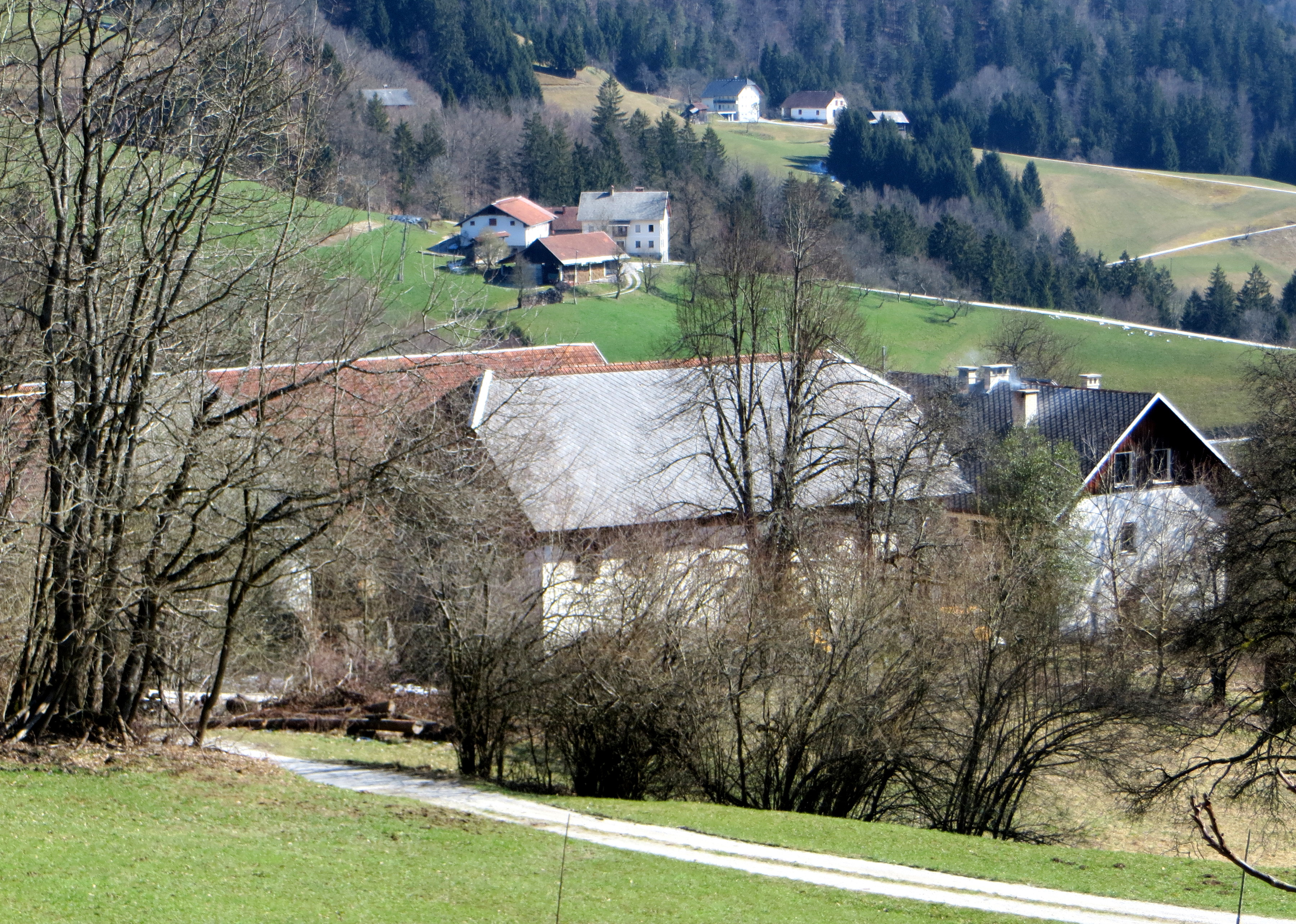

- Location in Slovenia
- Coordinates: 46°5′41.55″N 14°10′22.58″E
- Country: Slovenia
- Traditional region: Upper Carniola
- Statistical region: Upper Carniola
- Municipality: Gorenja Vas–Poljane

Area
  - Total: 2.36 km^{2} (0.91 sq mi)
- Elevation: 632.3 m (2,074 ft)

Population (2020)
  - Total: 24
  - Density: 10/km^{2} (26/sq mi)

Bačne (pronounced [ˈbaːtʃnɛ]; in older sources also Bačna, German: Watschna) is a small dispersed settlement in the hills south of the Poljane Sora Valley in the Municipality of Gorenja Vas–Poljane in the Upper Carniola region of Slovenia.

== Name ==
Bačne was attested in historical sources as Watschinach in 1500.
