= Javorjev Dol =

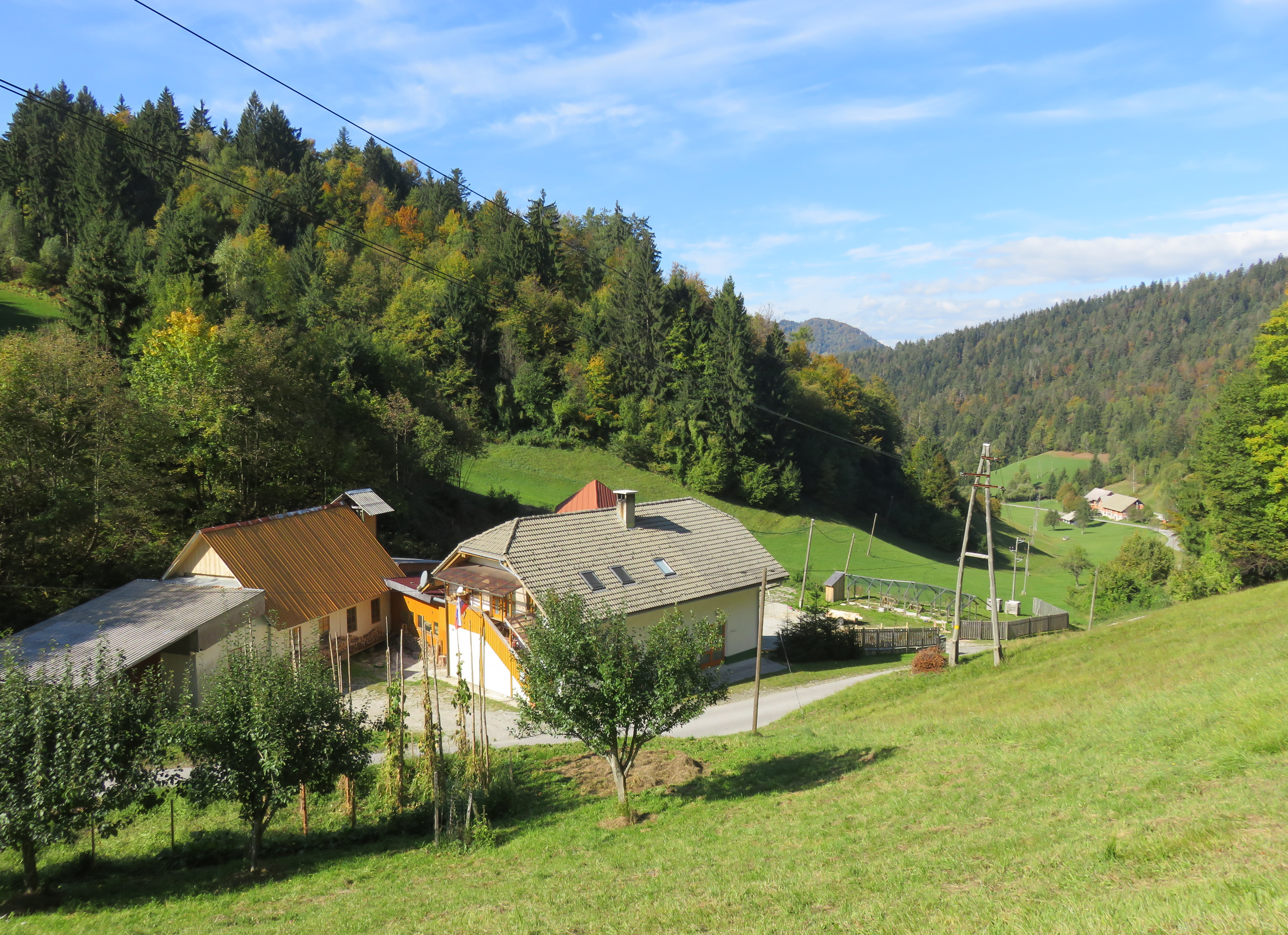

- Location in Slovenia
- Coordinates: 46°4′3.9″N 14°2′49.38″E
- Country: Slovenia
- Traditional region: Upper Carniola
- Statistical region: Upper Carniola
- Municipality: Gorenja Vas–Poljane

Area
  - Total: 1.49 km^{2} (0.58 sq mi)
- Elevation: 752.8 m (2,470 ft)

Population (2020)
  - Total: 13
  - Density: 8.7/km^{2} (23/sq mi)

Javorjev Dol (pronounced [ˈjaːʋɔɾjɛu̯ ˈdoːu̯], German: Jaworjudol) is a small dispersed settlement in the hills southwest of Gorenja Vas in the Municipality of Gorenja Vas–Poljane in the Upper Carniola region of Slovenia.
