= Hobovše pri Stari Oselici =

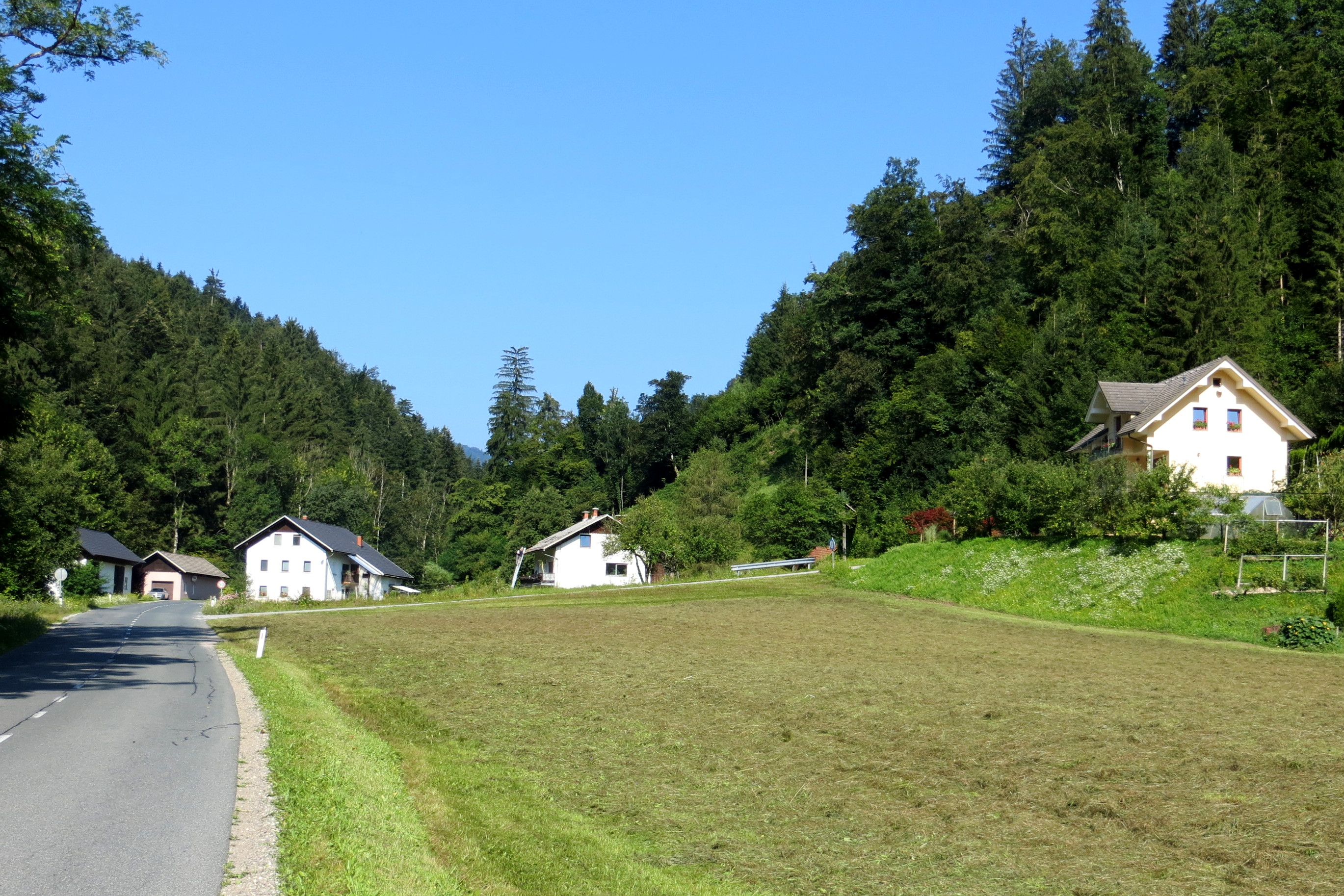

- Location in Slovenia
- Coordinates: 46°4′59.83″N 14°3′54.98″E
- Country: Slovenia
- Traditional region: Upper Carniola
- Statistical region: Upper Carniola
- Municipality: Gorenja Vas–Poljane

Area
  - Total: 1.39 km^{2} (0.54 sq mi)
- Elevation: 560.7 m (1,840 ft)

Population (2020)
  - Total: 65
  - Density: 47/km^{2} (120/sq mi)

Hobovše pri Stari Oselici (pronounced [xɔˈboːu̯ʃɛ pɾi ˈstaːɾi ˈoːsɛlitsi]; German: Hobousche bei Altoßlitz) is a dispersed settlement south of Stara Oselica in the Municipality of Gorenja Vas–Poljane in the Upper Carniola region of Slovenia.

== Name ==
The name Hobovše pri Stari Oselici means 'Hobovše near Stara Oselica'. The village was attested in historical sources as Chotwůsse in 1291, Chotwůsche in 1318, and Chadbuesch in 1500. The name is believed to derive from the plural demonym *Hotebǫďe-vьsʼane 'residents of Hotebǫdъ's village', referring to an early individual associated with the settlement.
