= Laniše, Gorenja Vas–Poljane =

Laniše
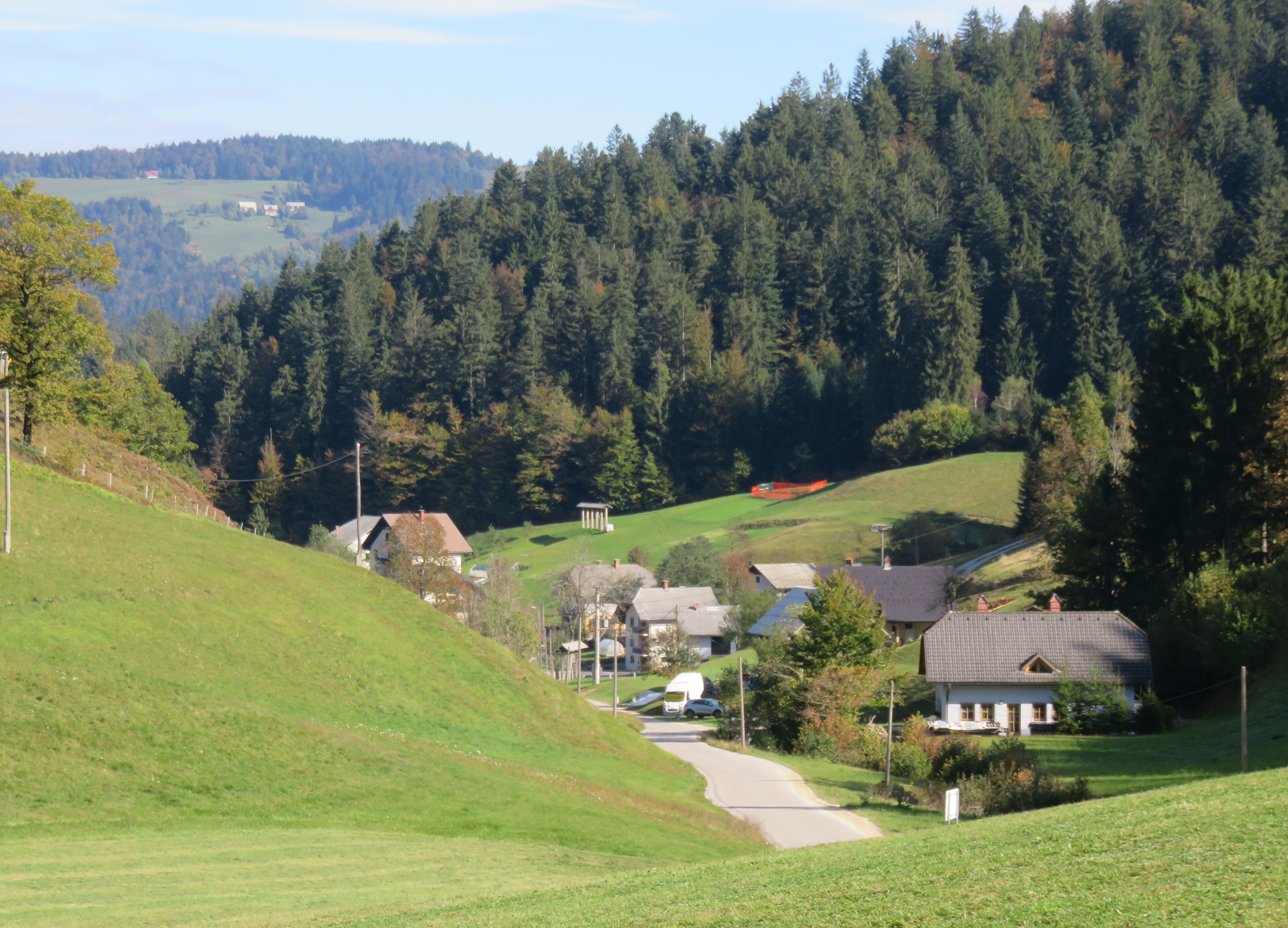

- Location in Slovenia
- Coordinates: 46°5′6″N 14°1′21.26″E
- Country: Slovenia
- Traditional region: Upper Carniola
- Statistical region: Upper Carniola
- Municipality: Gorenja Vas–Poljane

Area
  - Total: 1.01 km^{2} (0.39 sq mi)
- Elevation: 768.6 m (2,522 ft)

Population (2020)
  - Total: 72
  - Density: 71/km^{2} (180/sq mi)

Laniše (pronounced [laˈniːʃɛ]; in older sources also Lanišče, German: Lanische) is a dispersed settlement in the hills west of Gorenja Vas in the Municipality of Gorenja Vas–Poljane on the western edge of the Upper Carniola region of Slovenia.
