= Podvrh, Gorenja Vas–Poljane =

Podvrh
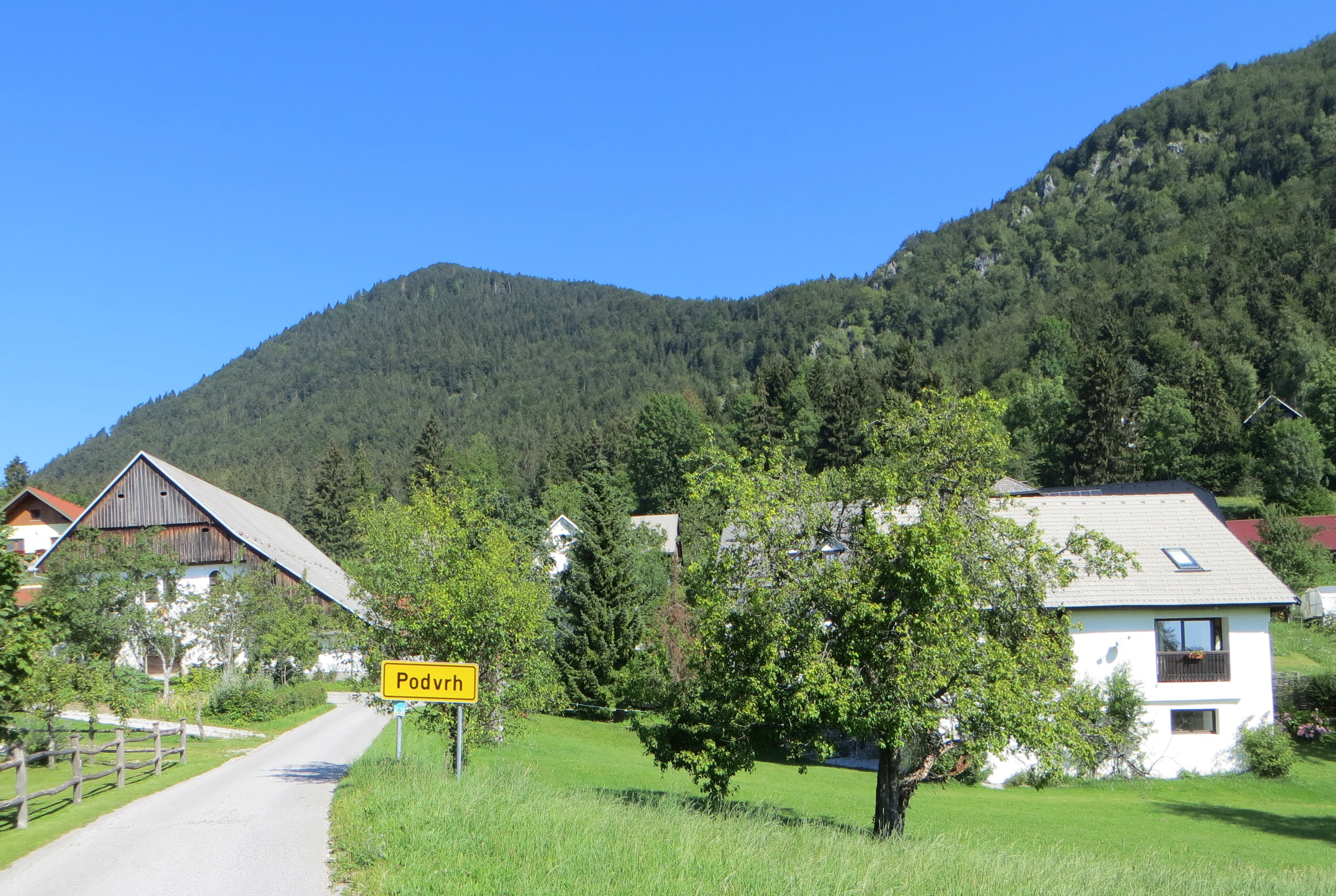

- Location in Slovenia
- Coordinates: 46°9′54.03″N 14°10′24.4″E
- Country: Slovenia
- Traditional region: Upper Carniola
- Statistical region: Upper Carniola
- Municipality: Gorenja Vas–Poljane

Area
  - Total: 2.74 km^{2} (1.06 sq mi)
- Elevation: 906.7 m (2,975 ft)

Population (2020)
  - Total: 44
  - Density: 16/km^{2} (42/sq mi)

Podvrh (pronounced [pɔˈdʋəɾx]; German: Podwerch) is a small settlement in the hills north of Poljane in the Municipality of Gorenja Vas–Poljane in the Upper Carniola region of Slovenia.
