= Zakobiljek =

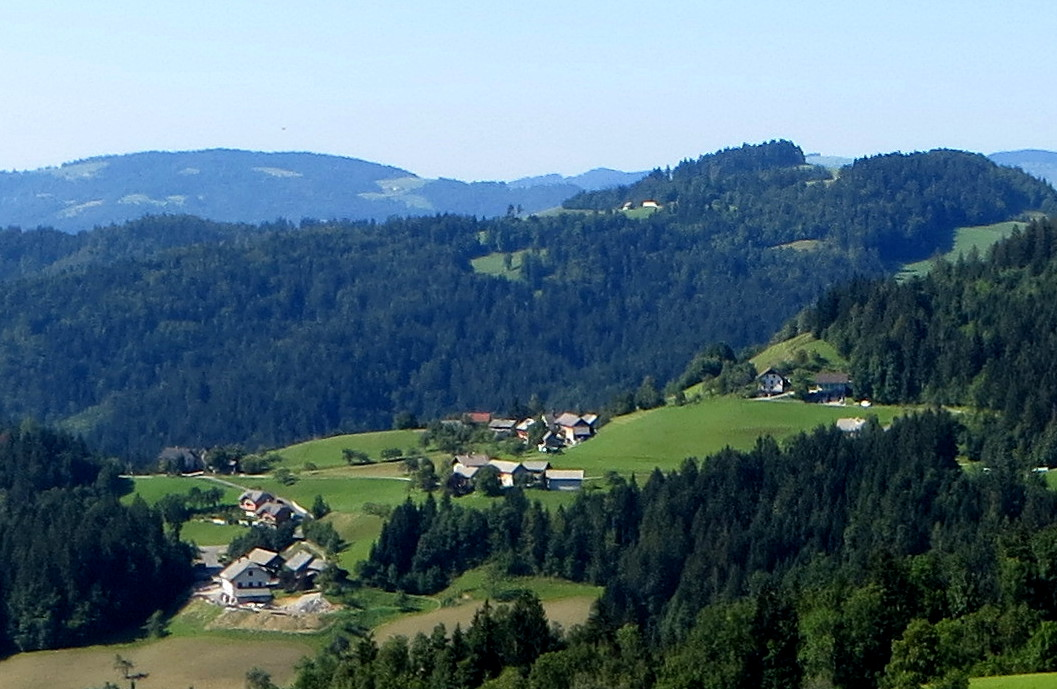

- Location in Slovenia
- Coordinates: 46°8′44.91″N 14°10′7.26″E
- Country: Slovenia
- Traditional region: Upper Carniola
- Statistical region: Upper Carniola
- Municipality: Gorenja Vas–Poljane

Area
  - Total: 0.51 km^{2} (0.20 sq mi)
- Elevation: 570.40 m (1,871.4 ft)

Population (2020)
  - Total: 43
  - Density: 84/km^{2} (220/sq mi)

Zakobiljek (pronounced [zakɔˈbiːljɛk]; German: Kobilze) is a small settlement in the hills north of Poljane nad Škofjo Loko in the Municipality of Gorenja Vas–Poljane in the Upper Carniola region of Slovenia.
