= Gorenje Brdo =

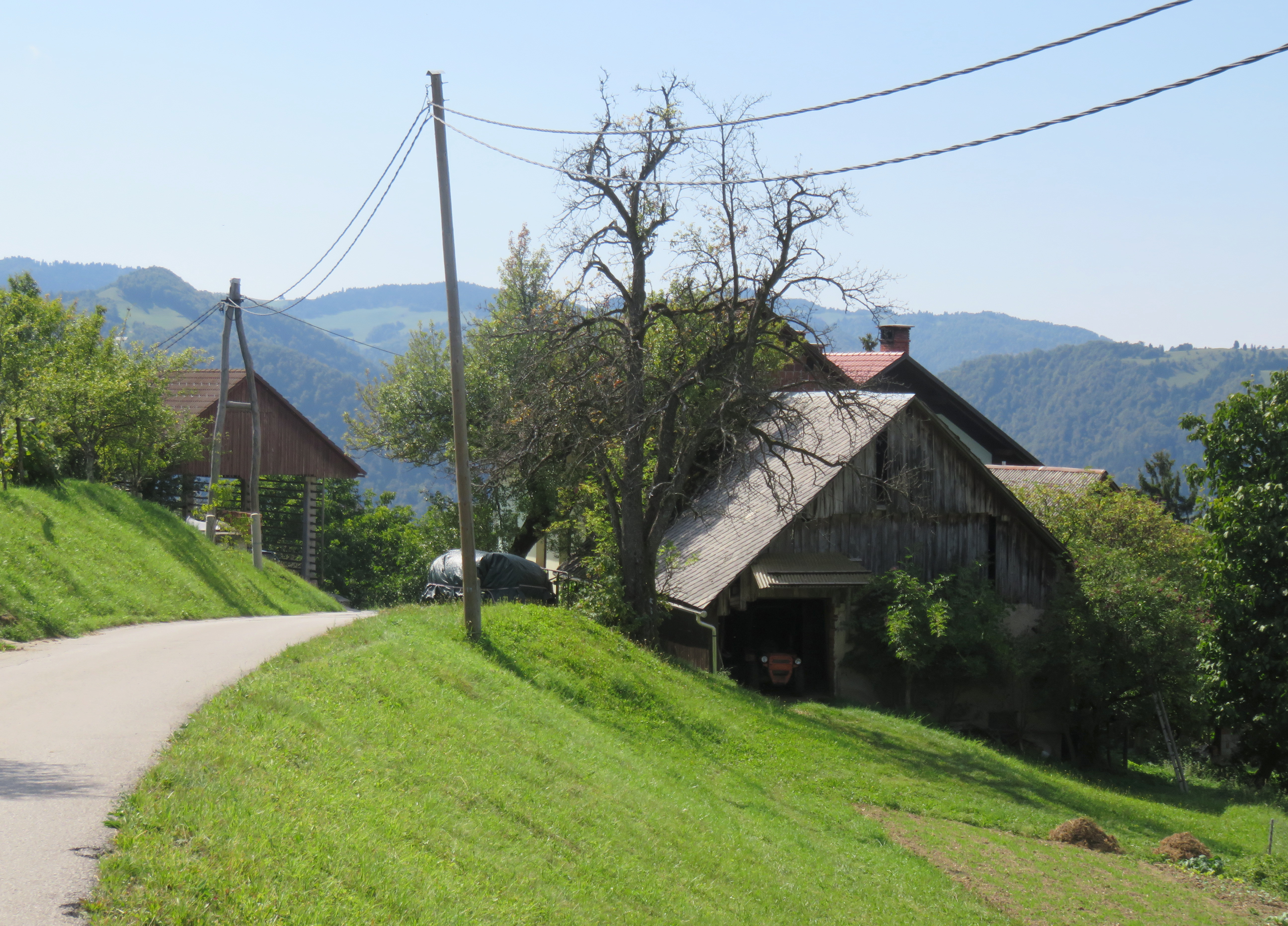

- Location in Slovenia
- Coordinates: 46°7′35.53″N 14°8′30.94″E
- Country: Slovenia
- Traditional region: Upper Carniola
- Statistical region: Upper Carniola
- Municipality: Gorenja Vas–Poljane
- Elevation: 696.8 m (2,286 ft)

Population (2020)
  - Total: 97

Gorenje Brdo (pronounced [ɡɔˈɾeːnjɛ ˈbəɾdɔ]) is a settlement in the hills north of the Poljane Sora Valley in the Municipality of Gorenja Vas–Poljane in the Upper Carniola region of Slovenia.
