= Gorenja Ravan =

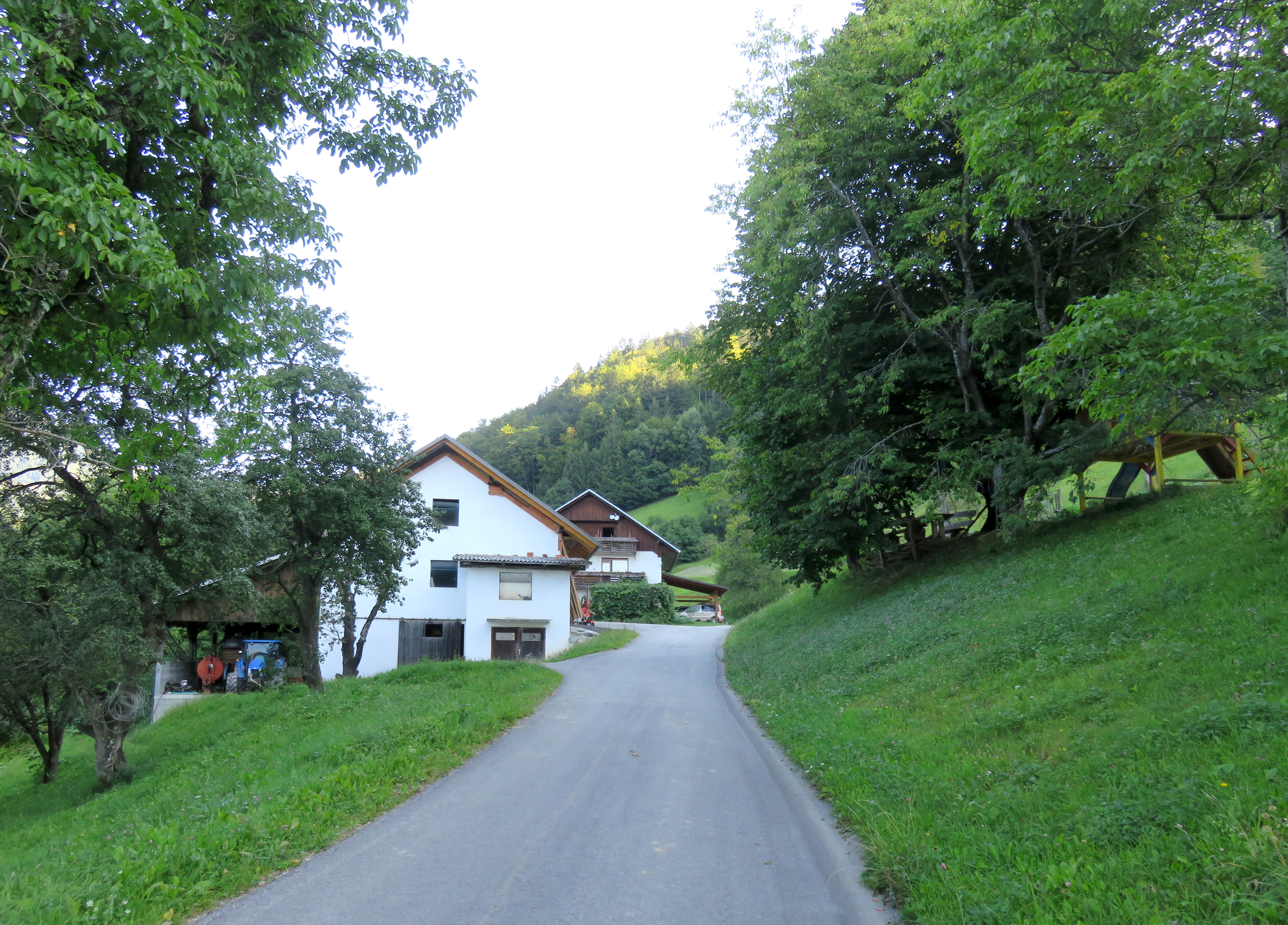

- Location in Slovenia
- Coordinates: 46°9′6.68″N 14°8′48.63″E
- Country: Slovenia
- Traditional region: Upper Carniola
- Statistical region: Upper Carniola
- Municipality: Gorenja Vas–Poljane
- Elevation: 773.7 m (2,538 ft)

Population (2020)
  - Total: 10

Gorenja Ravan (pronounced [ɡɔˈɾeːnja ɾaˈʋaːn]; in older sources also Zgornja Ravan, German: Sgornarawan) is a settlement in the hills north of Poljane nad Škofjo Loko in the Municipality of Gorenja Vas–Poljane in the Upper Carniola region of Slovenia.
