= Zetina =

Zetina is a surname. Notable people with the name include:

- Deandra Zetina (died 2008), Belizean shooting victim
- Luz María Zetina (born 1973), Mexican actress, model, TV host, Miss Mexico 1994
- Óscar Cantón Zetina (born 1953), Mexican politician affiliated with the National Regeneration Movement
- Sixto Zetina (born 1985), Mexican politician from the National Action Party

== See also ==
- Dolenja Zetina, dispersed settlement below Mount Blegoš in the Municipality of Gorenja Vas–Poljane in the Upper Carniola region of Slovenia
- Gorenja Zetina, small settlement in the Municipality of Gorenja Vas–Poljane in the Upper Carniola region of Slovenia
