= Marija Reven =

Slovenian bobbin lacemaker, lacemaking teacher and designer (1882–after 1945)

- Born: 23 January 1882; Idrija
- Died: date unknown (after 1945)
- Occupations: bobbin lacemaker, teacher, drafter, designer

Marija Reven (23 January 1882 – after 1945) was Slovenian bobbin lacemaker, teacher of bobbin lacemaking, drafter and designer. Her lacemaking patterns were advanced and are among best Slovenian lace patterns.

== Childhood and education ==
She was born on 23 January 1882 in Idrija into a lace-making and mining family to Marija Bajt and Franc Reven. As a child she attended the Idrija Lace School under the direction of Antonija Ferjančič, the sister of the school founder and first teacher, Ivanka Ferjančič. Recognized as a gifted student, after graduation she was sent to the three-year central lace course (Zentral Spitzenkurs) in Vienna for further training. There, in addition to advancing her lace-making skills, she also studied drawing and art. She completed her professional studies in Vienna between 1904 and 1905. At the end of November 1905, she began working.

== Work as a lace teacher ==
In 1906 she was employed as a bobbin lace-making teacher. In 1907 she became the first bobbin lace-making teacher at the lace school in Železniki, where she taught for twelve years. She taught how to make various fine laces. Her pupils were children aged five to fifteen, mostly girls. In the first years the school already had around forty-five pupils. Interest in lace-making in Železniki grew steadily, attendance grew greatly, and even experienced lacemakers sought additional training. As Marija Reven could no longer meet all the demands alone, additional teachers were employed.

After leaving Železniki in 1919, she worked part time as a lace-making teacher at the lace school in Trata, Gorenja Vas, where she remained until retirement. In 1920 she was employed as a professional teacher and pattern designer at the Central Institute for Women's Home Industry in Ljubljana (from 1929 called the State Central Institute for Women's Home Industry, abbreviated DOZ Ljubljana), where she worked until 1933.

== Work as a pattern designer ==
The oldest dated lace pattern with her signature is from 1904. In her early designs in broad drawing style, she mostly combined elements of mushrooms, small borders, peonies, and rosettes. She also early on designed patterns for composite lace. The lace makers of Železniki created complex and fine lace, mostly with floral elements, made with hair-thin linen thread. During her years in Železniki, Marija Reven drew many patterns for them.

When she became a professional teacher at DOZ Ljubljana, she was soon entrusted with drawing and designing new lace patterns for the entire institute. The patterns she created during her service at the institute are considered her best works. In this period she mainly designed demanding floral elements. She also adapted designs of folk costume figures by the painter Maksim Gaspari into lace patterns. Her lace pattern with a pomegranate element, published in the illustrated newspaper Slovenec in 1929, became especially popular. From 1925 until the beginning of the Second World War, the institute exhibited lace made from her patterns at numerous international exhibitions and fairs. Her best-known work is the lace pattern Slovene Bouquet (also known as Slovenski pušeljc), which she herself also produced, and which was exhibited at the international exhibition of home industry and applied arts in Copenhagen in 1930. Several of her designs are preserved in the lace collection of the Idrija Municipal Museum and in the City Museum of Ljubljana.

== Later life ==
In 1932 she trained and mentored one of the employees at DOZ Ljubljana, Antonija Thaler, later a lace teacher and designer, who succeeded her after her departure. After leaving DOZ Ljubljana in 1933, she continued teaching at the Trata lace school. She retired around 1936. She remained in Gorenja Vas, where she lived at least until the end of the Second World War.
