= Julka Gantar Fortuna =

Slovenian farmer, poet, and lacemaker (1916–1999)

- Born: Julka Gantar; January 28, 1916; Malenski Vrh, Austria-Hungary
- Died: December 12, 1999 (aged 83)
- Occupations: farmer, lacemaker, poet

Julka Gantar Fortuna (28 January 1916 – 12 December 1999) was a Slovenian farmer, lacemaker, and poet. She was an important promoter of Slovenia and Slovenian lace.

== Early life ==
Julka Gantar Fortuna was born on 28 January 1916 on a large farm known as the Posečnik homestead in Malenski Vrh, below Mount Blegoš. Her mother and father were farmers, and she grew up with seven siblings. One of the buildings on the farm also served as the village school, which she attended. The school was run by the only teacher in the village, Rezika Rant Demšar, who lived there together with her husband, his mother, and his sister, both of whom worked as day laborers and lace-makers. Julka learned the craft of lace-making at an early age from the teacher's mother-in-law and sister-in-law. Her teacher was described as highly dedicated and played an important role in the social and cultural development of the village. She enjoyed school and wished to continue her education at a high school and possibly become an actress, but her father did not allow it due to the heavy workload on the farm. After completing elementary school, she worked on the farm during the day and made lace in the evenings. She frequently visited her former teacher and became acquainted with the teacher's educated friends who came to visit her, through whom she gained additional informal education.

== Work ==
On 28 August 1935, she married farmer Vinko Fortuna from Smrečje above Vrhnika and moved to Smrečje and become a farmer. She abandoned lacemaking and devoted herself entirely to farm work. Before the outbreak of the Second World War, the couple had two children. During the Italian annexation of Slovenian territory, her husband was taken to an internment camp. On 2 August 1942, Italian forces intended to burn down her home and farm buildings, but with her limited knowledge of Italian she managed to persuade an officer to spare them. After her husband's return, the couple had five more children, bringing the total to seven, six sons and one daughter. In 1952, her husband suffered a stroke that left him permanently disabled, requiring Julka to care for him in addition to already working in the fields.

== Lacemaking ==
In the mid-1950s, when her older children began taking over some of the farm work, she again found time for lacemaking in the evenings. In autumn 1958, with the support of the State Sales Institute for Home and Artistic Crafts in Ljubljana (DOM Ljubljana), lacemaking was revived in the valley, and within two years more than fifty lacemakers were active. Due to her experience, Julka took responsibility for purchasing lace for DOM Ljubljana in the Vrhnika region. She later ended cooperation with the company and began working independently. She organized several lacemaking courses and exhibitions of local lace. In 1978, she first presented a miniature lace pillow, which became established as a tourist souvenir. In 1982, it received a quality label in Slovenj Gradec, and in 1984 she was awarded the title of "Master of Home Crafts". Between 1980 and 1990, she taught lacemaking to more than 200 women and girls of all ages through courses for youth and adults. She demonstrated lacemaking at tourist and cultural events in Slovenia, particularly in Lipica, and abroad, wearing traditional Upper Carniolan folk costume and presenting Slovenian lace. She also met Pope John Paul II during one such event.

== Literary work ==
During her childhood, lacemakers would often recite or sing songs while working together. Wanting to revive this tradition but unable to recall the original songs, Julka began writing simple lacemakers’ poems in 1963, modeled on folk poetry and often suitable for existing folk melodies. Encouraged by positive responses, she published her first poetry collection, From Heart to Heart (Iz srca do srca), containing thirty-two poems, in 1964. Although DOM initially promised her support, it later withdrew, saying her poetry wouldn't sell. Therefore, she published the collection at her own expense. She sold all 2,000 copies of the first edition and reissued the collection in 1983 with thirteen additional poems and an introduction by poet Neža Maurer. A further expanded edition was published in 1993. Some of her poems were set to music. She also published local history articles accompanied by photographs in magazines Kmečki glas and Loški razgledi.

== Later life and death ==
Her husband, whom she cared for sixteen years, died in 1968. After their children took over the farm, she devoted more time to lacemaking. She was an initiator and organizer of the restoration of a rock-carved niche chapel of Our Lady of Lourdes in Lipica, once a popular pilgrimage site before the Second World War, which she was very proud of. She died on 12 December 1999.

== Bibliography ==
- From Heart to Heart: Lacemakers’ and Other Poems (Iz srca do srca: čipkarske in druge pesmi)(1964)
- From Heart to Heart (Iz srca do srca) (expanded edition, 1983)
- From Heart to Heart: With Additional New Poems (Iz srca do srca: in dodane nove pesmi) (expanded edition, 1993)
