= Antonija Thaler =

Slovenian bobbin-lace maker, draughtswoman and designer (1914–2014)

- Born: Antonija Thaler; 20 December 1914; Železniki, Austria-Hungary (now Slovenia)
- Died: 2014 (aged 99–100)
- Occupations: bobbin-lace maker, lace-making teacher, draughtswoman, designer

Antonija Thaler, also known as Toni Thaler, (20 December 1914 – December 2014) was a Slovenian bobbin lace maker, draughtswoman and designer. Lace after her designs is still made.

== Childhood and education ==
She was born on 20 December 1914 in Železniki to a Slovenian family. Her mother was the innkeeper Antonija Košmelj, and her father was the innkeeper Gabrijel Thaler. As a child she attended the local primary school as well as the lace-making school in Železniki, where her teacher was Marija Pivk Kosem. After completing primary school, she enrolled in the Ursuline girls’ school in Škofja Loka. There she learned needlework and drawing in addition to other subjects. She later continued her education in the department of artistic embroidery at the State Women's Craft School (DOZ) in Ljubljana. Her drawing teacher there was the painter and composer Saša Šantel, brother of painter Henrika Šantel. She completed her studies at the craft school in 1932 with a master's examination qualifying her as a gold–silver–pearl embroiderer.

== Work ==
After finishing craft school she wished to study at the School of Applied Arts in Vienna. From her former schoolmate from DOZ Neli Niklsbacher Bregar, who studied there, she learned that admission required one year of work experience, so she took a position in the embroidery department of the DOZ. Because of the illness of a colleague, she soon obtained work as assistant to the designer and pattern draughtswoman Marija Reven. Marija Reven soon discovered that Antonija Thaler could make lace and had talent for drawing. She transferred her from the embroidery to the lace department, enrolled her in an advanced lace-making course, and taught her privately as well. Thus, Antonija Thaler shifted from embroidery to bobbin lace. Because of the economic crisis she could not continue her studies in Vienna, so she remained at the DOZ. In 1933, when Marija Reven left the DOZ, Antonija Thaler assumed her position of designer and draftswoman. While working as an apprentice at the DOZ, she completed the professional examination for craft-school teachers, but continued to work as a designer at the DOZ. She collaborated closely with her colleague Neža Pelhan Klemenčič, a former classmate from craft school. They created many designs and often served together on juries evaluating lace in competitions. In 1937 they both participated in the International Exhibition of Art and Industry in Paris, representing the DOZ, and each received an honorary diploma bearing her name.

In 1946 the State Central Institute for Women's Domestic Crafts was reorganised as the State School for Women's Domestic Crafts, directed by Neli Niklsbacher Bregar. Antonija Thaler became a specialist teacher at the institute. Instruction in lace-making initially followed old Austrian curricula, but that same year Antonija Thaler and Neža Pelhan Klemenčič wrote a new one.

In 1949 she was transferred to the design-technical department of the State Sales Institute for Domestic and Applied Crafts in Ljubljana (DOM Ljubljana), where she worked as a pattern designer until 1955. Neža Pelhan Klemenčič was also transferred there, and the two continued to collaborate. Their most productive years were between 1952 and 1955, when they were granted considerable artistic freedom.

During this period the craft school in Ljubljana was reopened, and Antonija Thaler taught there, initially as a contractor and later as a permanent teacher, until her retirement in 1968.

== Later life and death ==
After her retirement she continued to cooperate occasionally with DOM Ljubljana, assembling lace into finished products and serving on juries evaluating lacework. She also worked with lace makers in her native Železniki. She died in December 2014.

== Artistic style ==
Her patterns are similar to graphic art. She drew them freehand, using only templates, curve rulers, and straightedges. Common motifs include flowers, especially carnations, and also spider-web structures and "brain-pattern" designs. Many of her patterns were created for bobbin lace in blind and twisted tape techniques, They were sold on the Italian market. She also designed wide tape patterns with picot finishes, which were required by the German market. Some of her patterns were published in the catalogue Slovenske ročno klekljane čipke (Slovenian Hand-made Bobbin Lace), issued by DOM Ljubljana in 1952. Many of her designs are preserved in the City Museum of Ljubljana.
