= Nova Vas pri Žireh =

Hamlet in Žiri, Slovenia

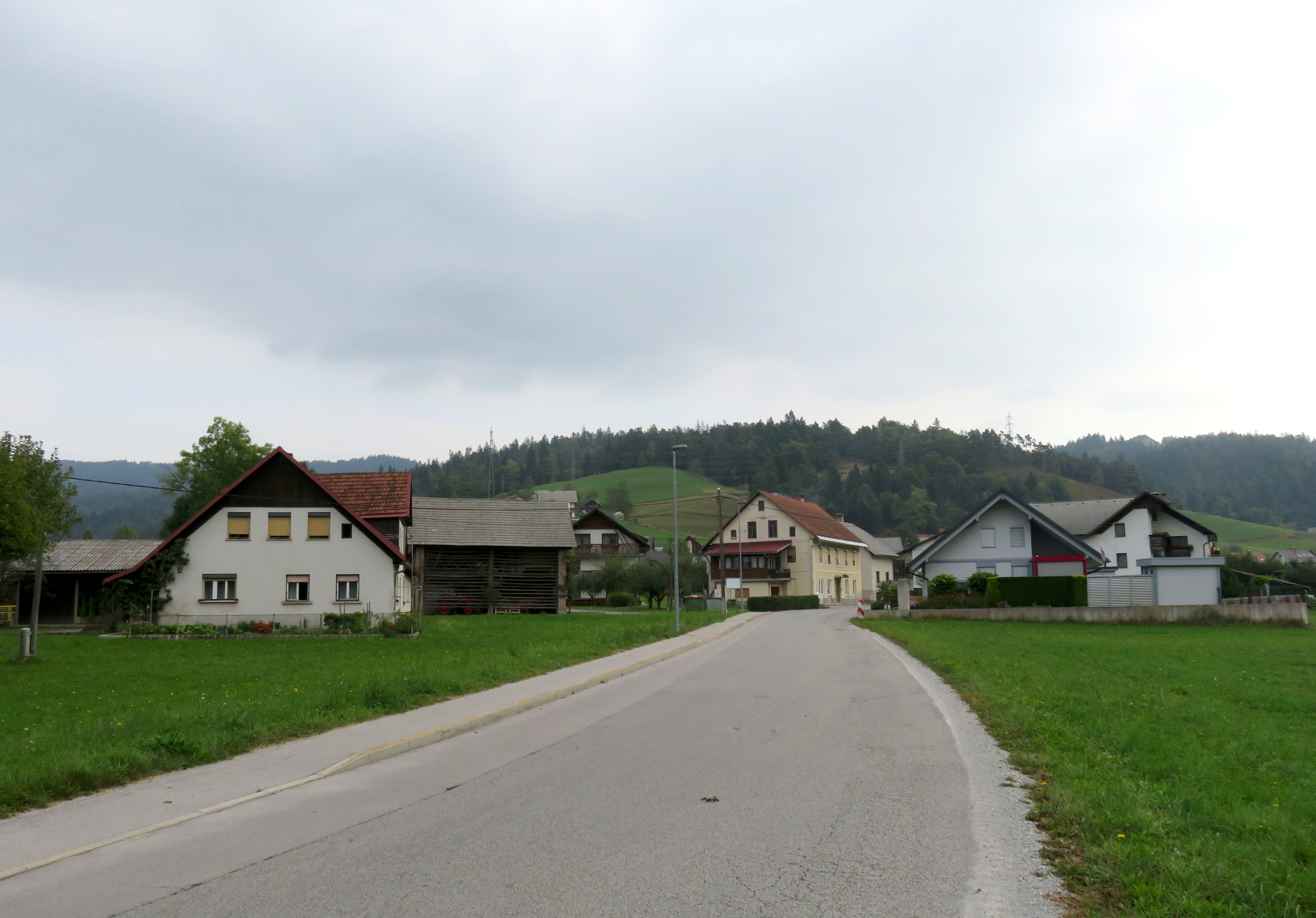

- Location in Slovenia
- Coordinates: 46°2′50″N 14°7′17″E
- Country: Slovenia
- Traditional region: Upper Carniola
- Statistical region: Upper Carniola
- Municipality: Žiri
- Elevation: 500 m (1,600 ft)

Nova Vas pri Žireh (pronounced [ˈnɔːʋa ˈʋaːs pɾi ʒiˈɾeːx], Slovene: Nova vas pri Žireh, German: Neudorf) is a formerly independent settlement in the Municipality of Žiri in western Slovenia. It is now part of the town of Žiri. It is part of the traditional region of Upper Carniola and is now included with the rest of the municipality in the Upper Carniola Statistical Region.

== Geography ==
Nova Vas pri Žireh is an elongated village at the southeast edge of the Žiri Plain (Slovene: Žirovsko polje) above the right bank of Račeva Creek. It lies along the road from Žiri to Smrečje. Kovtrovec Hill (elevation: 642 meters or 2,106 feet) rises to the northeast and Goropeke Hill (Slovene: Goropeški grič, elevation: 682 meters or 2,238 feet) to the south.

== Name ==
The name of the settlement was changed from Nova vas to Nova vas pri Žireh (i.e., 'Nova Vas near Žiri') in 1955 to distinguish the settlement from others sharing the same name. The name Nova vas (literally, 'new village') is relatively common in Slovenia, referring to a settlement that was established later than a neighboring one. In the case at hand, compare neighboring Stara Vas (literally, 'old village') immediately west of the settlement.

== History ==
Nova Vas pri Žireh was annexed by Žiri in 1981, ending its existence as an independent settlement.

== Notable people ==
Notable people that were born or lived in Nova Vas pri Žireh include:

- Frančiška Giacomelli Gantar (1905–1988), bobbin lacemaker, drafter, designer
- France Kopač (sl) (1885–1941), painter
