= Stara Vas, Žiri =

Stara Vas
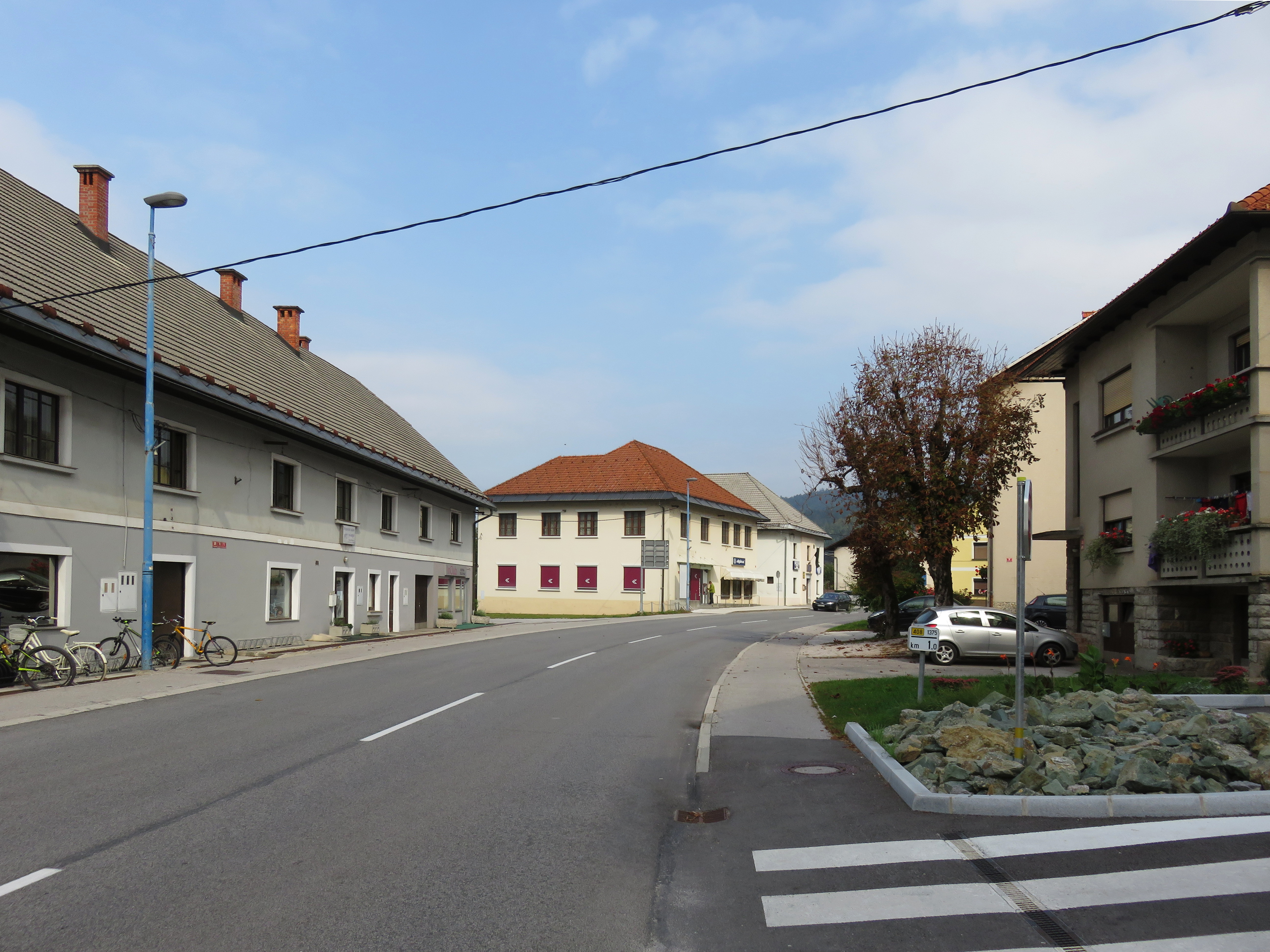

- Location in Slovenia
- Coordinates: 46°2′49″N 14°6′35″E
- Country: Slovenia
- Traditional region: Upper Carniola
- Statistical region: Upper Carniola
- Municipality: Žiri
- Elevation: 480 m (1,570 ft)

Stara Vas (pronounced [ˈstaːɾa ˈʋaːs], Slovene: Stara vas, German: Starawaß) is a formerly independent settlement in the Municipality of Žiri in western Slovenia. It is now part of the town of Žiri. It is part of the traditional region of Upper Carniola and is now included with the rest of the municipality in the Upper Carniola Statistical Region.

== Geography ==
Stara Vas lies along the road from Škofja Loka to Žiri at the point where Račeva Creek discharges into the Poljane Sora River. It is also connected by road to Smrečje. A part of the settlement known as Jezera, which was formerly swampy and subject to frequent flooding, was built up following regulation of Račeva Creek. Goropeke Hill (Slovene: Goropeški grič, elevation: 682 meters or 2,238 feet) rises to the southeast.

== Name ==
The name Stara vas (literally, 'old village') is relatively common in Slovenia, referring to a settlement that was established earlier than a neighboring one. In the case at hand, compare neighboring Nova Vas pri Žireh (literally, 'new village near Žiri') immediately east of the settlement.

== History ==
Stara Vas was industrialized after the Second World War, with companies such as Alpina Žiri (manufacturing shoes) and Elektro Žiri. Stara Vas was annexed by Žiri in 1981, ending its existence as an independent settlement.

== Notable people ==
Notable people that were born or lived in Stara Vas include the following:

- Miha Naglič (sl) (born 1952), essayist and philosopher
- Konrad Peternelj (sl) (1936–2000), painter
