= Neli Niklsbacher Bregar =

Slovenian embroiderer,ethnologist and writer (1912–1982)

- Born: Kornelija Niklsbacher; December 25, 1912; Trieste (then Austria-Hungary)
- Died: March 4, 1982 (aged 69); Kamnik (then Socialist Republic of Slovenia, Socialist Federal Republic of Yugoslavia)
- Occupations: embroiderer, headmistress, writer, ethnologist, etnographer

Kornelija Niklsbacher Bregar, also known as Neli Niklsbacher Bregar (25 December 1912 – 4 March 1982), was a Slovenian embroiderer, ethnologist, and author of professional and instructional works on Slovenian folk textile arts.

== Early life and education ==
She was born on Christmas Day in 1912 into a well-off Slovenian family in Trieste. Her mother was Avrelija Hočevar and her father Ferdo Niklsbacher. She had an older sister and a younger brother. In 1919 she moved with her family to Ljubljana, where she attended primary school. She also studied music at the Glasbena matica. She later continued her education at the department of artistic embroidery at the Central State Institute for Women's Crafts in Ljubljana. Among her classmates were lacemakers and designers Antonija Thaler and Neža Pelhan Klemenčič, whose friend she become and with whom she later collaborated. She completed her studies in 1931 and worked for a year as an embroiderer before continuing her education at the School of Arts and Crafts in Vienna.

== Career ==
After completing her studies in Vienna, she worked and continued her training in textile arts. In 1946 the Central State Institute for Women's Crafts in Ljubljana was reorganized into the State School for Women's Crafts, where she became headmistress (director). Antonija Thaler and Neža Pelhan Klemenčič were employed as teachers at the school. Through her professional guidance, the school provided support to the State Sales Institute for Home and Artistic Crafts in Ljubljana, which organized the sale of handicraft products after the WWII. Alongside her administrative work, she researched Slovenian folk embroidery, collaborating with several ethnologists, including Marija Jagodic Makarovič and Anka Novak. Her primary focus was on Upper Carniola counted-thread cross-stitch embroidery from the 16th to 19th centuries and White Carniola embroidery of the 19th century.She authored two books on folk embroidery. She also co-authored three books on crochet and knitting, and two books on sewing. She also served as a terminological consultant for the Dictionary of Slovenian Language (SSKJ), published in 1970 by the Slovenian Academy of Sciences and Arts.

== Later life and death ==
After retiring around 1975, she settled in Kamnik. She was married but had no children (at least none who reached adulthood). She died on 4 March 1982 in Kamnik.

== Selected bibliography ==
- ABC of Hand Knitting (Ljubljana: Institute for Household Advancement, 1956).
- Crocheting (with Vlada Marcon, Ljubljana: Central Institute for Household Advancement, 1957).
- Crocheting and Knitting (with Vlada Marcon and Ida Marinčič, 1966).
- Folk Embroideries in Slovenia: Coloured Counted-Thread Embroidery (Ljubljana: Central Institute for Household Advancement, 1968).
- Folk Embroidery in Slovenia (with Marija Jagodic Makarovič, Ljubljana: Central Institute for Household Advancement, 1970).
- I Cut and Sew Myself (with Viktor Lindtner, illustrated by Mojca Rus Jalen, Ljubljana: Central publishing house for Household Advancement, 1974).
- I Make it Myself (Ljubljana, Cankarjeva založba, 1974)
