= Dolenja Žetina =

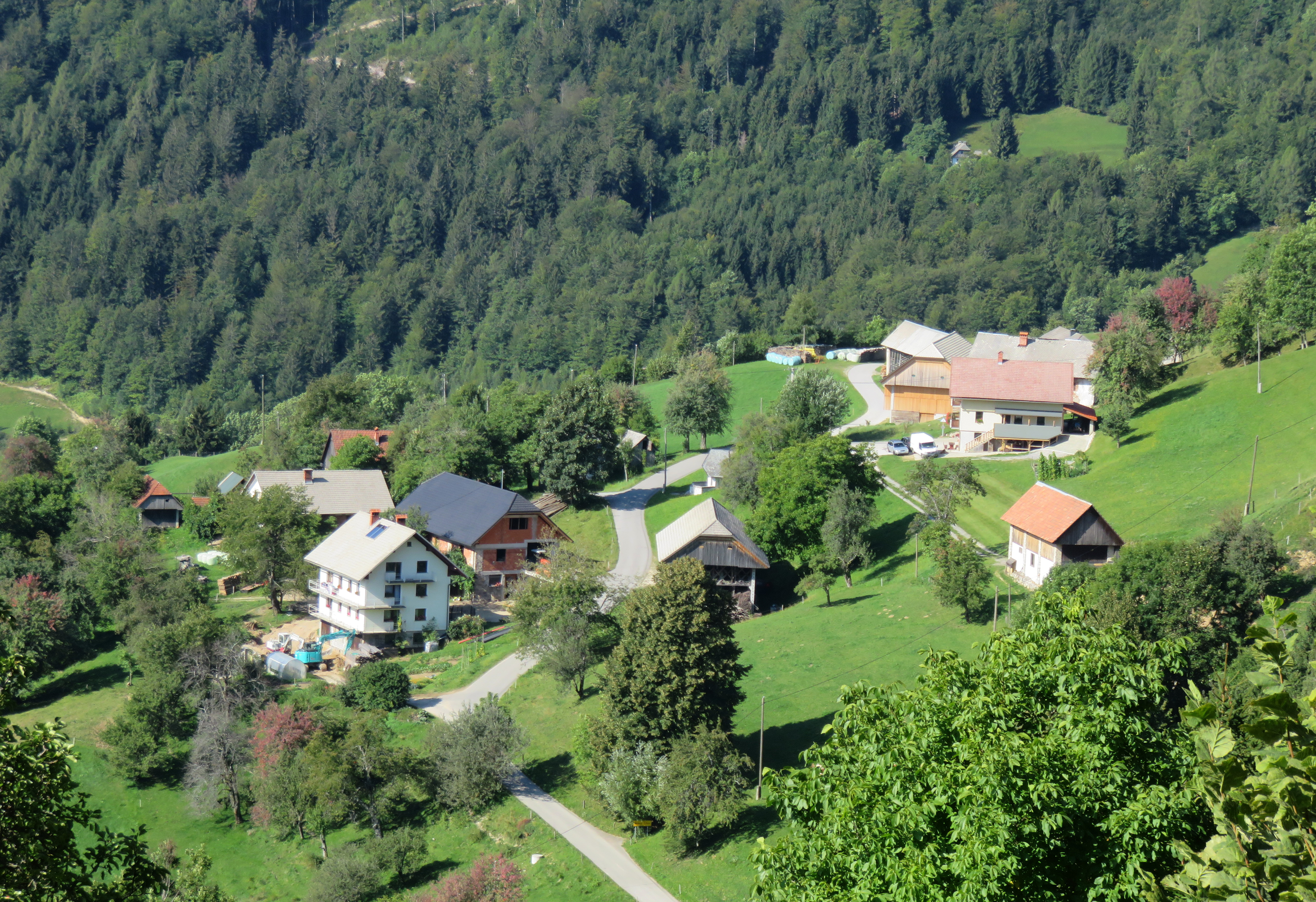

- Location in Slovenia
- Coordinates: 46°9′29.08″N 14°8′11.46″E
- Country: Slovenia
- Traditional region: Upper Carniola
- Statistical region: Upper Carniola
- Municipality: Gorenja Vas–Poljane

Area
  - Total: 3.41 km^{2} (1.32 sq mi)
- Elevation: 700.9 m (2,300 ft)

Population (2020)
  - Total: 43
  - Density: 13/km^{2} (33/sq mi)

Dolenja Žetina (pronounced [dɔˈleːnja ʒɛˈtiːna]; in older sources also Dolenja Šetina, German: Doleinaschettina) is a dispersed settlement below Mount Blegoš in the Municipality of Gorenja Vas–Poljane in the Upper Carniola region of Slovenia. It is a clustered village on a low terrace in the foothills of Mount Koprivnik. There are many springs in the area and there are abandoned mills in the two ravines below the settlement.

== Name ==
The name Dolenja Žetina literally means 'lower Žetina', distinguishing the settlement from neighboring Gorenja Žetina 'upper Žetina'. The settlement was known as Doleinaschettina in German in the past.

== History ==
In the past, the economy of the village was based on farming and forestry. The farms in Dolenja Žetina produced grain, and the villagers used the pastures on Mount Blegoš for pasturing their cattle and sheep, which they raised for sale. They also sold wood from the surrounding forests and practiced lace-making.
