= Trata, Gorenja Vas–Poljane =

Trata
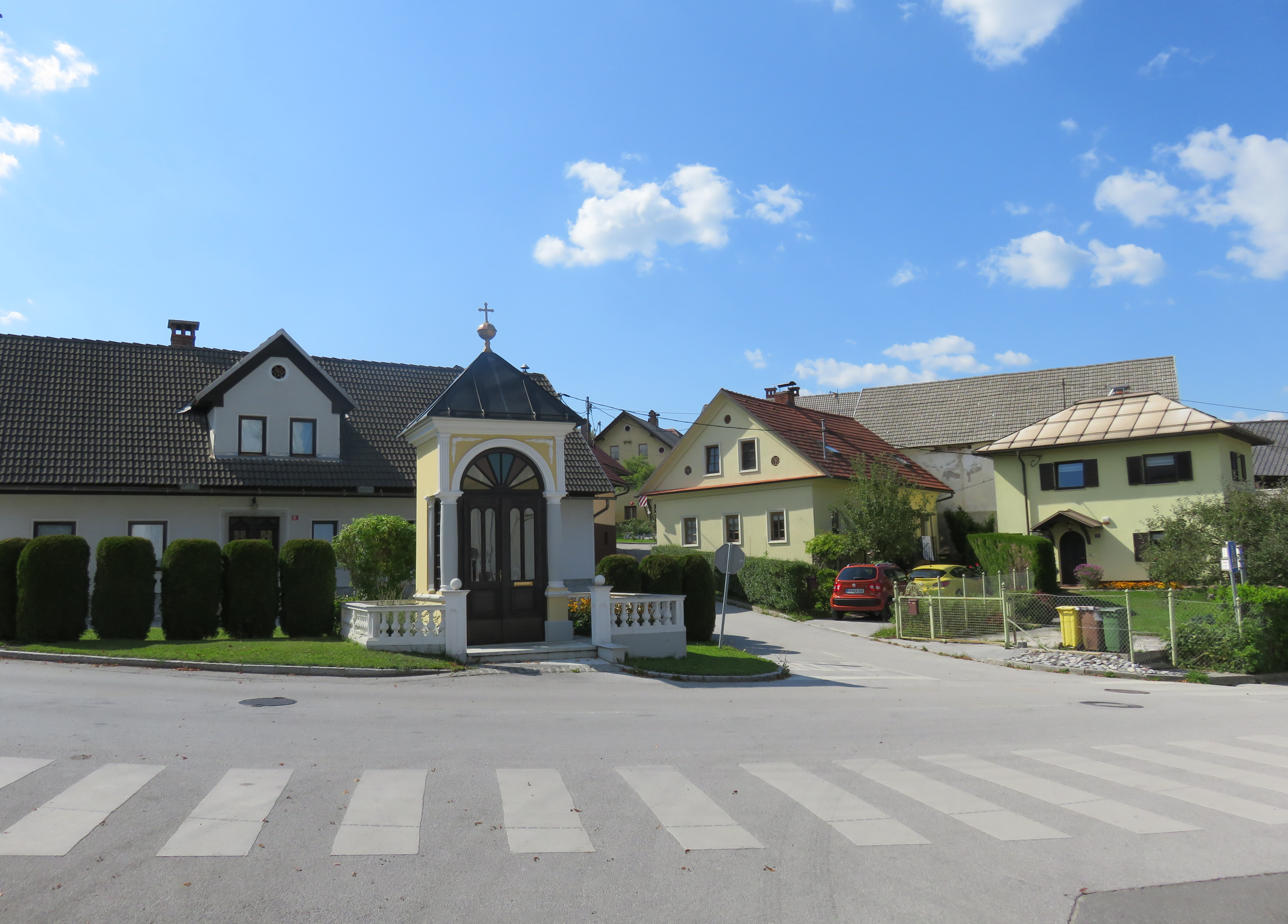

- Location in Slovenia
- Coordinates: 46°06′10″N 14°08′23″E
- Country: Slovenia
- Traditional region: Upper Carniola
- Statistical region: Upper Carniola
- Municipality: Gorenja Vas–Poljane
- Elevation: 407 m (1,335 ft)

Trata (pronounced [ˈtɾaːta]) is a former village in northwestern Slovenia in the Municipality of Gorenja Vas–Poljane. It is now part of the town of Gorenja Vas. It is part of the traditional region of Upper Carniola and is now included in the Upper Carniola Statistical Region.

== Geography ==
Trata stands on a terrace above the right bank of the Poljane Sora River southwest of the former village of Sestranska Vas. The hamlet of Lajše to the southeast was also part of Trata while it was a separate village.

== Name ==
Locally, Trata is known as Trate (i.e., a plural form of the name). The name Trata occurs several times in Slovenia. It is derived from the Slovene common noun trata 'small treeless meadow', which was borrowed from Middle High German trat 'meadow'.

== History ==
Trata was annexed by the town of Gorenja Vas in 1953, ending its existence as an independent settlement.

== Church ==
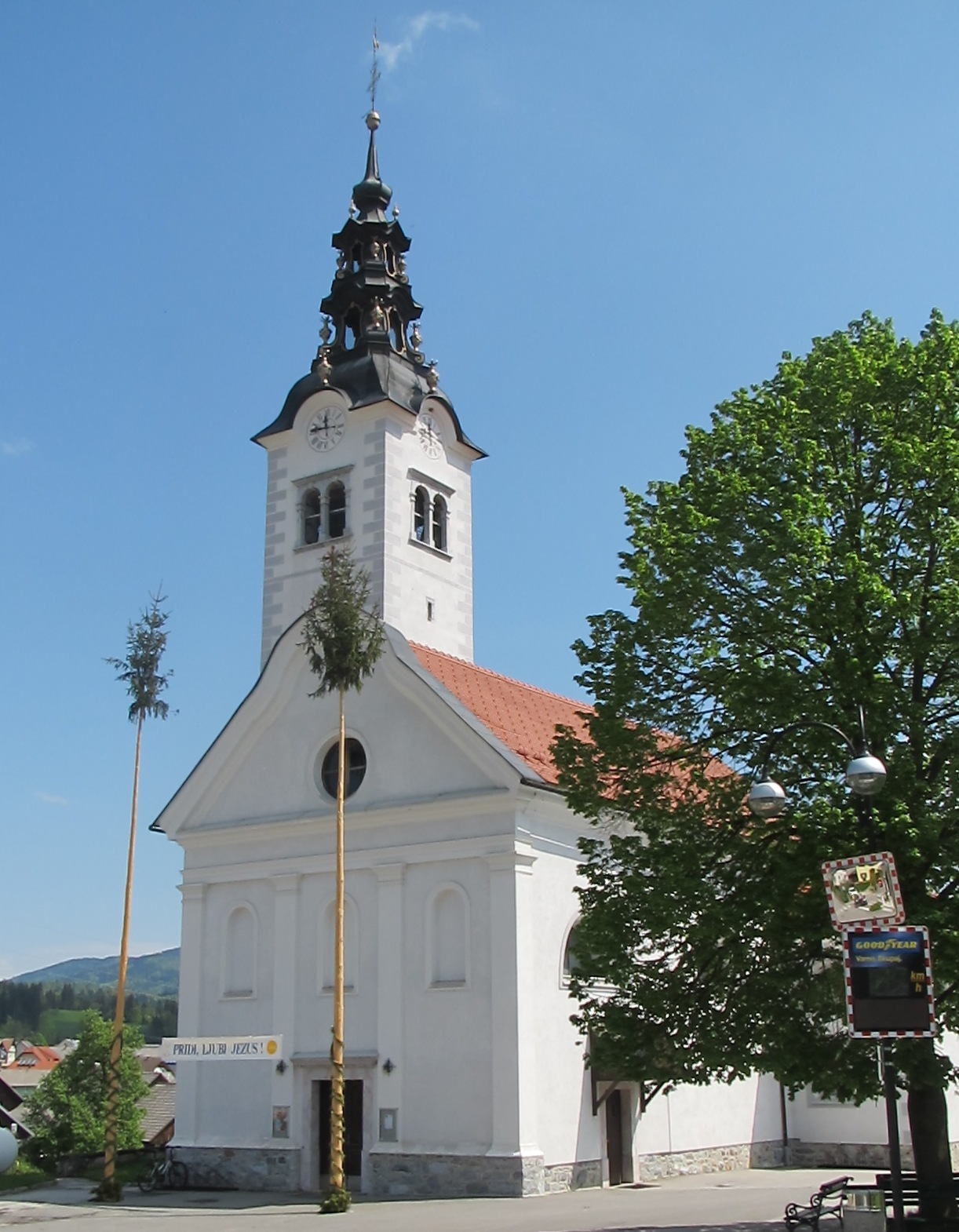
Saint John the Baptist Church

The Gorenja Vas parish church stands in Trata and is dedicated to Saint John the Baptist.

== Notable people ==
Notable people that were born or lived in Trata include:

- Anton Dolinar (sl) (1894–1953), musician
- Ivan Regen (1868–1947), biologist, born in Lajše
- Marija Reven (1882 – after 1945), bobbin lacemaker
