= Leopoldina Pelhan =

Slovenian lacemaking teacher, drafter and designer (1880–1947)

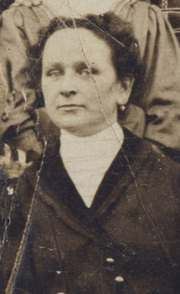
- Leopoldina Pelhan in 1906
- Born: October 20, 1880; Idrija, Austria-Hungary
- Died: July 17, 1947 (aged 66); Ljubljana, Slovenia
- Occupations: Lace maker, lace-making teacher, draughtswoman, designer

Leopoldina Pelhan (20 October 1880 – 17 July 1947) was a Slovenian bobbin-lace maker, teacher of bobbin lace making, draughtswoman and designer.

== Early life and education ==
She was born on 20 October 1880 in Idrija into a lace-making and mining family, to mother Ivana Gregorač and father Leopold Pelhan. In 1888 she began attending the four-year public elementary school in Idrija, which she completed with distinction in 1892. As a child, she also attended the Idrija Lace School under the direction of Antonija Ferjančič, sister of Ivanka Ferjančič. As the best student, after completing lace school she received a scholarship from the Idrija mine, which enabled her to continue her education in Vienna. There she completed a three-year central lace-making course (Zentral Spitzenkurs). In addition to perfecting her lace-making skills, she also studied drawing and art subjects. After completing her professional training in Vienna, she began working as a teacher.

== Work ==
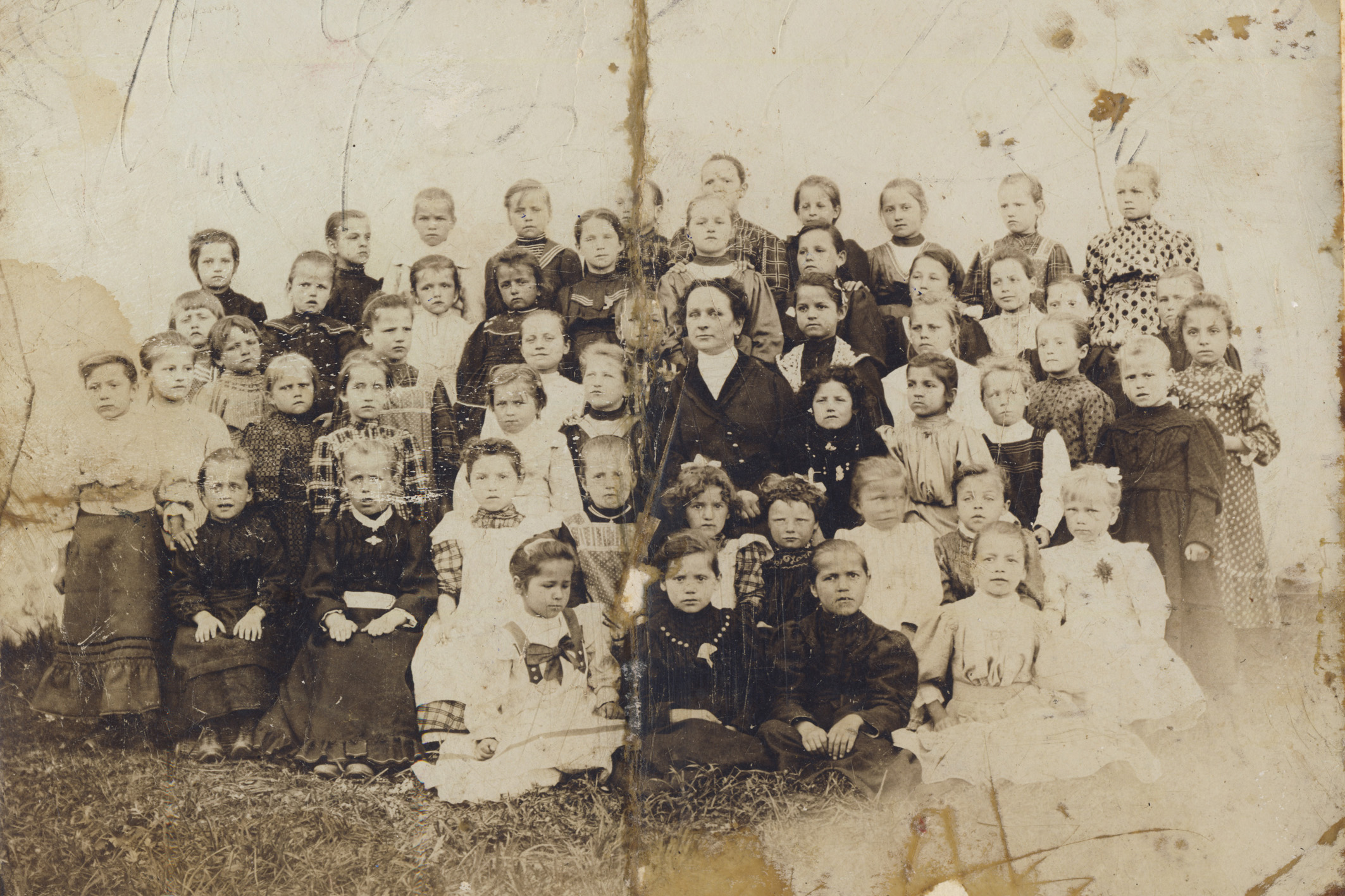
Leopoldina Pelhan (adult woman in black in the center) with students of the lace school in 1906

In 1906, she was employed as a lace-making teacher at the newly established lace school in Žiri, where she worked until her retirement. At the time of her arrival, around 200 people in Žiri were engaged in lace-making. Many local women earned their living as lace makers. With the establishment of the lace school, lace-making in Žiri flourished and reached new heights. Many children between the ages of 5 and 15, mostly girls, came to learn from her. Even experienced lace makers from Žiri attended her classes for advanced training. Among her regular students was the lace maker and draughtswoman Frančiška Giacomelli Gantar, who studied under her between 1912 and 1919. Her niece Neža Pelhan Klemenčič, also a lace-making teacher, remembered her aunt Leopoldina as a precise and conscientious teacher, a devout Catholic, and a tall, slender woman with curly black hair and blue eyes, who was always elegantly dressed and remained faithful to the fashion of her youth until her death.

She also designed and drew lace patterns in the style of Žiri lace, which differs from Idrija lace in specific bobbin techniques and design elements.

She also made complex lace pieces herself. She collaborated with various Slovenian artists, including the painter Bara Remec, according to whose design she created in lace the Sacred Heart of Mary, depicting Mary with Jesus and the burning heart framed with picots, which was well received.

== Later life and death ==
In 1936, she retired and left Žiri. In 1937, she designed and made a bobbin-lace depiction of the Basilica of Mary Help of Christians, Brezje for the university in Pittsburgh. She never married and had no children. She died on 17 July 1947 in Ljubljana.
