= Malenski Vrh =

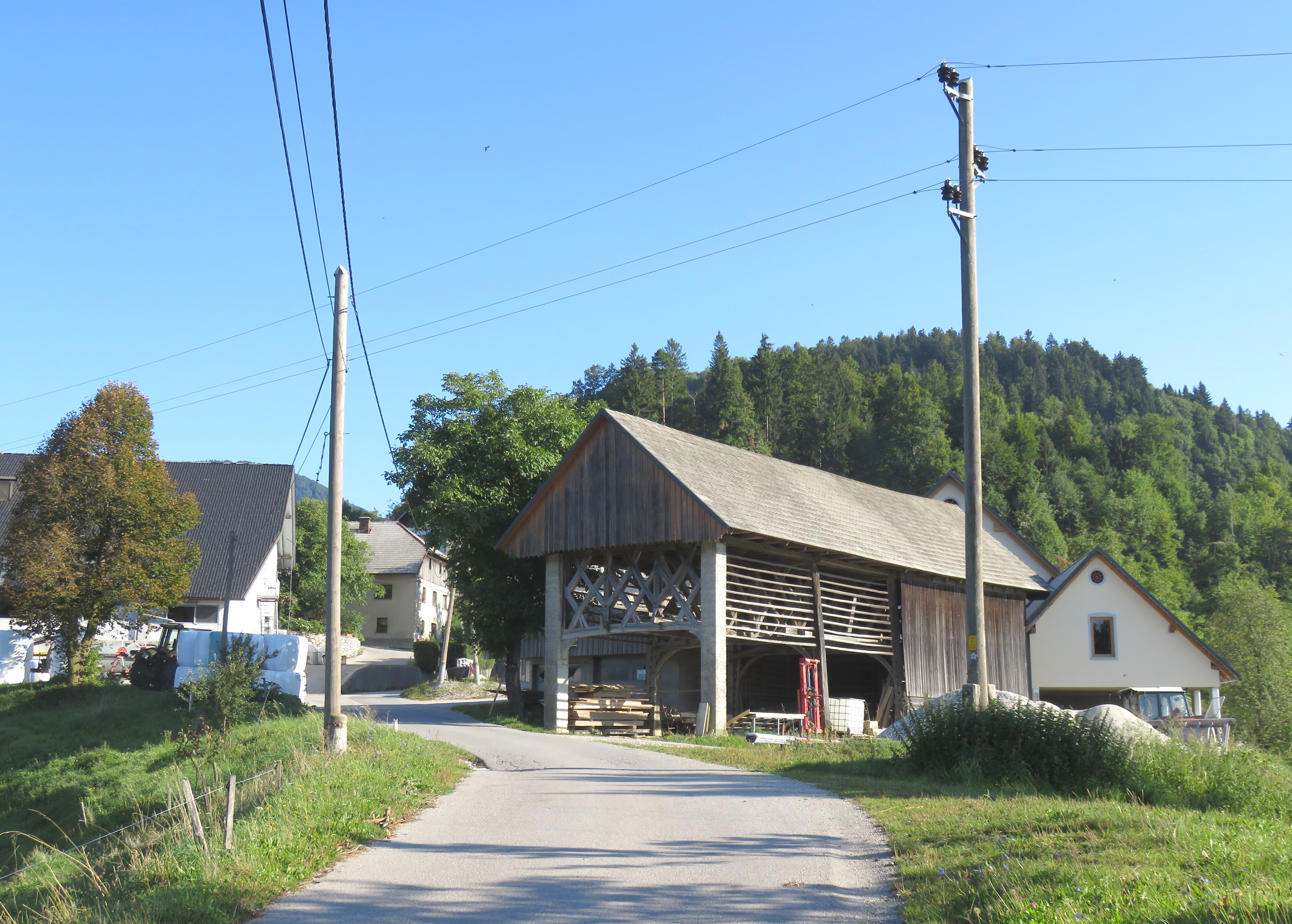

- Location in Slovenia
- Coordinates: 46°8′32.05″N 14°8′51.96″E
- Country: Slovenia
- Traditional region: Upper Carniola
- Statistical region: Upper Carniola
- Municipality: Gorenja Vas–Poljane

Area
  - Total: 1.37 km^{2} (0.53 sq mi)
- Elevation: 698.5 m (2,292 ft)

Population (2020)
  - Total: 47
  - Density: 34/km^{2} (89/sq mi)

Malenski Vrh (pronounced [ˈmaːlɛnski ˈʋəɾx]) is a small settlement in the Municipality of Gorenja Vas–Poljane in the Upper Carniola region of Slovenia. It lies in the hills north of Poljane.

== Name ==
The name Malenski Vrh literally means 'Mill Peak'. It is derived from maln 'mill'.

== Prominent residents ==
- Julka Gantar Fortuna (1916–1999), Slovenian farmer, poet and lacemaker
