= Marija Makarovič =

Slovene ethnologist

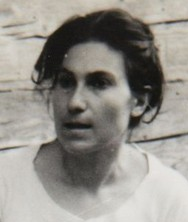
- Marija Makarovič in 1963
- Born: 15 August 1930 (age 95); Ljubljana, Slovenia
- Awards: Levstik Award; 1979 for Kmečka abeceda and Kmečko gospodarstvo na Slovenskem
- Scientific career
- Fields: ethnology

Marija Makarovič, née Jagodic, (born 15 August 1930) is a Slovene ethnologist.

Makarovič was born in Ljubljana in 1930. After graduating from the University of Ljubljana in 1953 she worked as a curator at the Slovene Ethnographic Museum from 1953 until 1989. From 1993 to 1997 she led the Urban Jarnik Slovene Ethnographic Institute in Klagenfurt. In 2001 she was one of the co-founders of Centre for Biographic Research in Ljubljana together with Prof. Dr. Mojca Ramšak.

She collaborated with many ethnologist including Neli Niklsbacher Bregar.

In 1979 she won the Levstik Award for her book Kmečka abeceda and Kmečko gospodarstvo na Slovenskem (The Farmer's Alphabet and Farm Management in Slovenia).

In 2014 she won the Deklica s Piščalko Award, which is awarded by county Kočevje for professionalism in the fields of art, culture, and humanitarian sciences.
