= Ivan Regen =

Slovenian biologist (1868–1947)

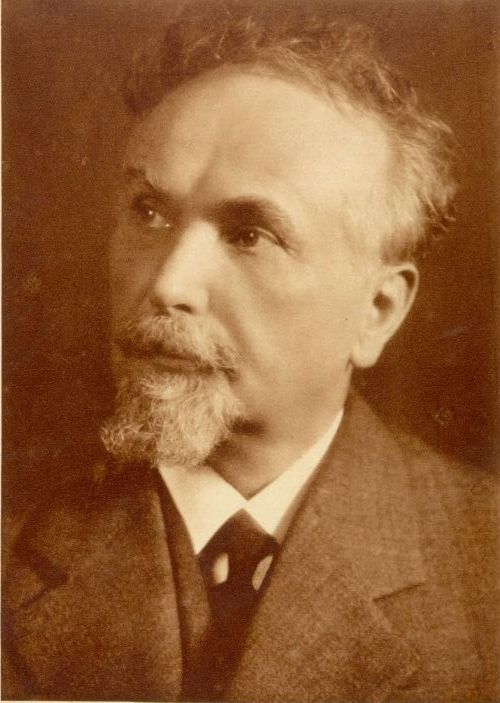
- Born: December 9, 1868; Lajše, Austria-Hungary (now Slovenia)
- Died: July 27, 1947 (aged 78); Vienna, Austria
- Education: University of Vienna
- Known for: establishing modern bioacoustics
- Scientific career
- Fields: animal physiology, bioacoustics
- Academic advisors: Karl Grobben, Sigmund Exner, Carl Friedrich Wilhelm Claus

Ivan (or Janez) Regen (known also as Johann Regen) (December 9, 1868 – July 27, 1947) was a Slovenian biologist, best known for his studies in the field of bioacoustics.

Regen was born in the hamlet of Lajše in Trata (today part of Gorenja Vas, Slovenia) and became interested in insect sounds as a child. His family couldn't afford to pay for his schooling, so he studied first at the local seminary for which he received a scholarship, and slowly saved enough funds for the tuition fee in Vienna. There he studied natural history at the University of Vienna under the tutorship of Grobben, Exner and Claus. He received his doctorate in 1897 and began to work as a gymnasium professor, first in Vienna, and later in Hranice (Moravia). At last he was transferred back to a gymnasium in Vienna after a recommendation from Exner and worked there until his retirement in 1918.

In the meantime Regen began his research in animal physiology, being one of the first Slovenian scientists to work abroad after the World War I. With careful observations of katydid and cricket stridulation he proved that insects respond to acoustic stimuli from other individuals and was able to provoke his subjects to respond to artificial stimulation using a loudspeaker. Later, he demonstrated that insect hearing depends on intact tympanal organ which was the first description of this organ's function. For his contributions he is regarded as the founder of modern bioacoustics. He also studied other physiological phenomena in insects, such as breathing, hibernation, the development of pigment under different conditions, and ecdysis.

Regen's largest project was a so-called "geobiological laboratory", a large terrarium in which he studied phonotaxis on a large scale. Using as many as 1600 females with intact or damaged hearing organs, he was able to statistically evaluate their behaviour.

He was a private researcher since 1911, but remained in touch with Slovenia, supporting several local societies and cultural institutions, and establishing Slovene terminology for the fields he worked in. In 1921, he declined the invitation to become a professor at the University of Ljubljana. In 1940, he became an associate member of Slovenian Academy of Sciences and Arts and was also an honorary member of Slovenian society of natural history.
