= Sestranska Vas =

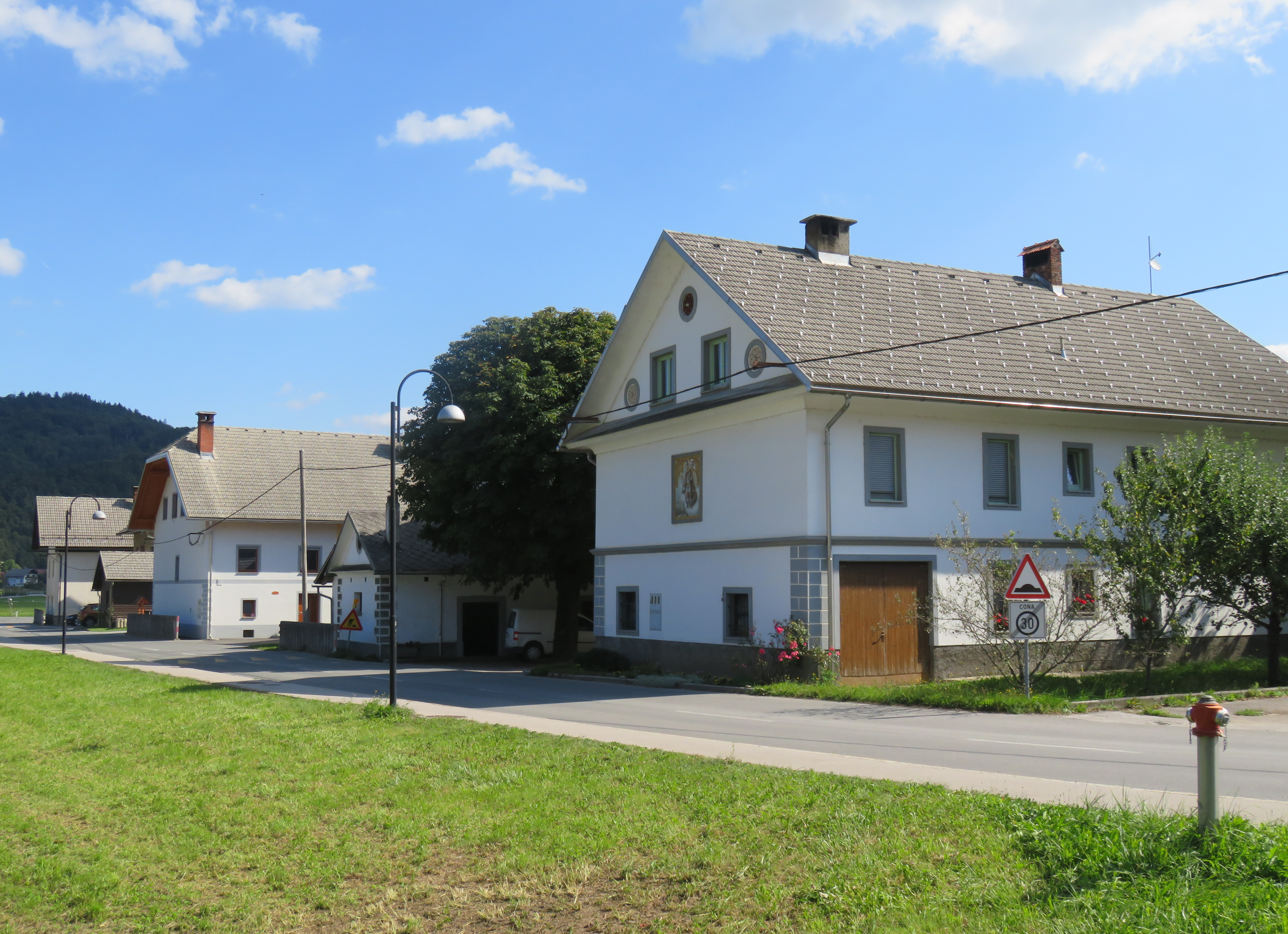

- Location in Slovenia
- Coordinates: 46°06′17″N 14°08′30″E
- Country: Slovenia
- Traditional region: Upper Carniola
- Statistical region: Upper Carniola
- Municipality: Gorenja Vas–Poljane
- Elevation: 402 m (1,319 ft)

Sestranska Vas (pronounced [sɛˈstɾaːnska ˈʋaːs], Slovene: Sestranska vas, German: Sestranskawas) is a former village in northwestern Slovenia in the Municipality of Gorenja Vas–Poljane. It is now part of the town of Gorenja Vas. It is part of the traditional region of Upper Carniola and is now included in the Upper Carniola Statistical Region.

== Geography ==
Sestranska Vas lies on the right bank of the Poljane Sora River, between the former village of Trata to the southwest and the old center of Gorenja Vas to the northeast.

== Name ==
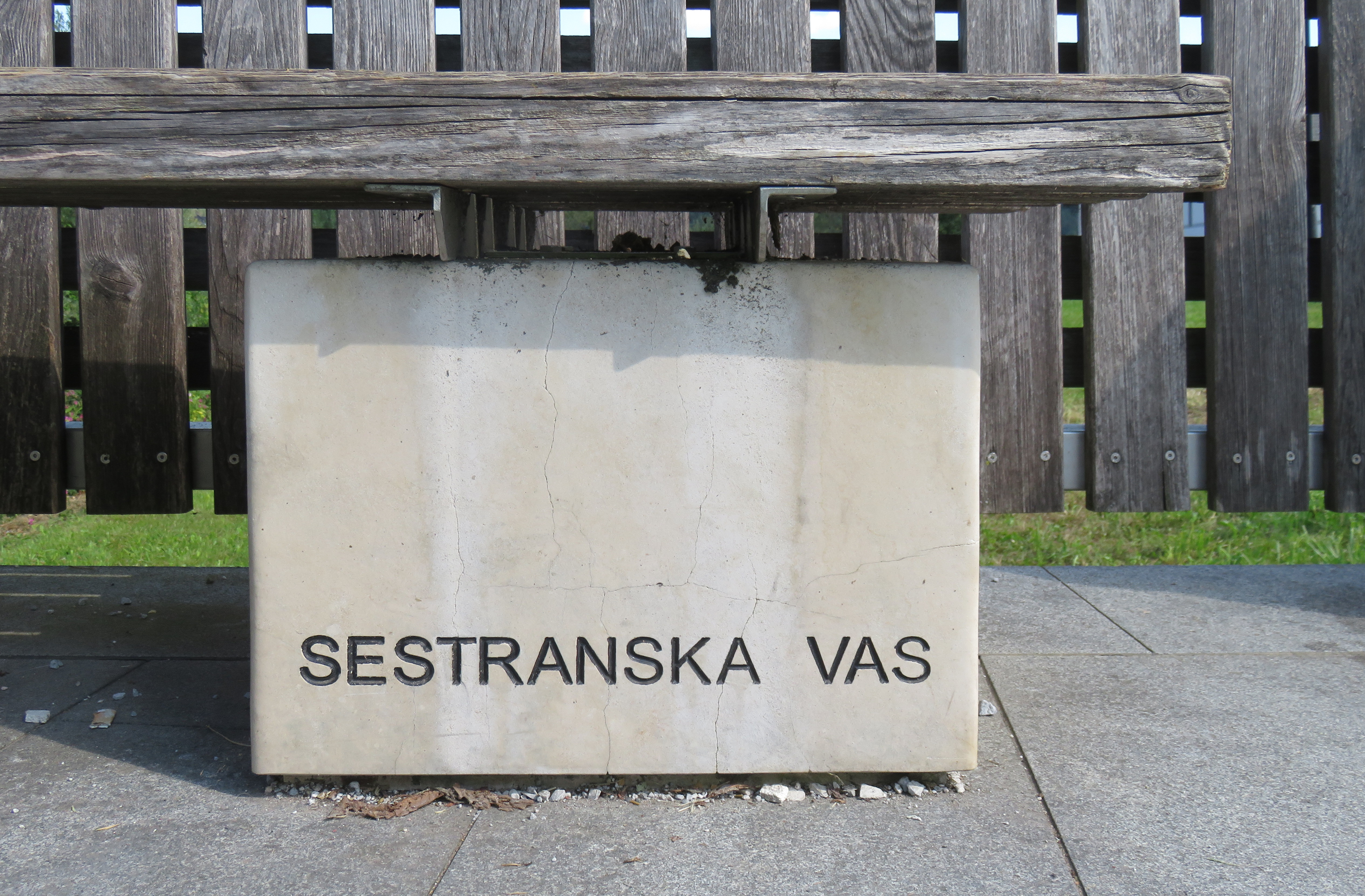
Detail of a bench on a footbridge to Sestranska Vas

Sestranska Vas was attested in Latin in 1291 as in Polan ex altera parte aque 'on the other side of the water in [the Parish of] Poljane', and in German in the 18th century as Schwesterdorf (literally, 'sister village'). The name Sestranska Vas is related to the frequent Slovenian toponym Stranska vas (literally, 'side village'), and it either refers to a place of secondary importance in comparison to a nearby larger and older settlement or indicates its location on the (other) side of the river.

== History ==
Sestranska Vas was annexed by the town of Gorenja Vas in 1953, ending its existence as an independent settlement.
