= Frančiška Giacomelli Gantar =

Slovenian lacemaker, drafter and designer (1905–1988)

- Born: Frančiška Giacomelli; February 5, 1907; Nova Vas pri Žireh
- Died: January 1, 1988 (aged 80); Nova Vas pri Žireh
- Occupations: bobbin lacemaker, drafter, designer

Frančiška Giacomelli Gantar (27 February 1905 – 1 January 1988) was Slovenian bobbin lacemaker, drafter and designer. Her lacemaking patterns were very popular in Slovenia at her time and are still made nowadays.

== Early life ==
Frančiška Giacomelli Gantar was born on 27 February 1905 in Nova Vas pri Žireh into a poor family. Her mother was a farm worker Frančiška Gregorač and her father was farm worker Franc Giacomelli. It was her father who first taught her the basics of lace-making. At the age of seven she entered the lace school. Her lace teacher was Leopoldina Pelhan, with whom she studied lace-making for eight years.

== Career ==
At fifteen she began working as a bobbin lacemaker. She produced complex lace and demand for her work was high. In 1920 a new border was set, and lace patterns ("paperci") from Idrija were no longer available. Frančiška was artistically gifted, and some lacemakers encouraged her to start drawing patterns herself. At first she hesitated, as she was earning well from lacemaking. In 1926 she created her first patterns. She invented and drew the designs herself, first copying them with carbon paper, later with a special copying machine. Initially, she created patterns for a shopkeeper who exported lace to the American market, and later for several other merchants. She also produced custom patterns for individual clients, drawing to the requested size and filling them with motifs. She drew freehand with a soft pencil, so corrections could be erased. The only base she had pre-drawn was the honeycomb grid in various sizes. Soon she abandoned lacemaking altogether and earned her living solely from designing and reproducing patterns.

In 1931 she married Vinko Gantar. Her husband strongly supported her work and, when orders were heavy, also helped copy patterns with the machine. Occasionally her sister and sister-in-law, themselves lacemakers, assisted her as well. She kept every pattern she ever made.

== Later life and death ==
In old age, Frančiška Giacomelli Gantar considered burning her collection of patterns, believing they would only be a burden after her death because lacemaking in Žiri had lost its former popularity. Her daughter convinced her to preserve them. She died on 1 January 1988 in Nova Vas pri Žireh.

== Artistic legacy ==
Her artistic legacy is now cared for by her daughter, a prize-winning lacemaker. Lace based on her patterns is still being produced. In 2017, an exhibition of her patterns and lace made from them was held in Žiri.
