= Jelovica, Gorenja Vas–Poljane =

Jelovica
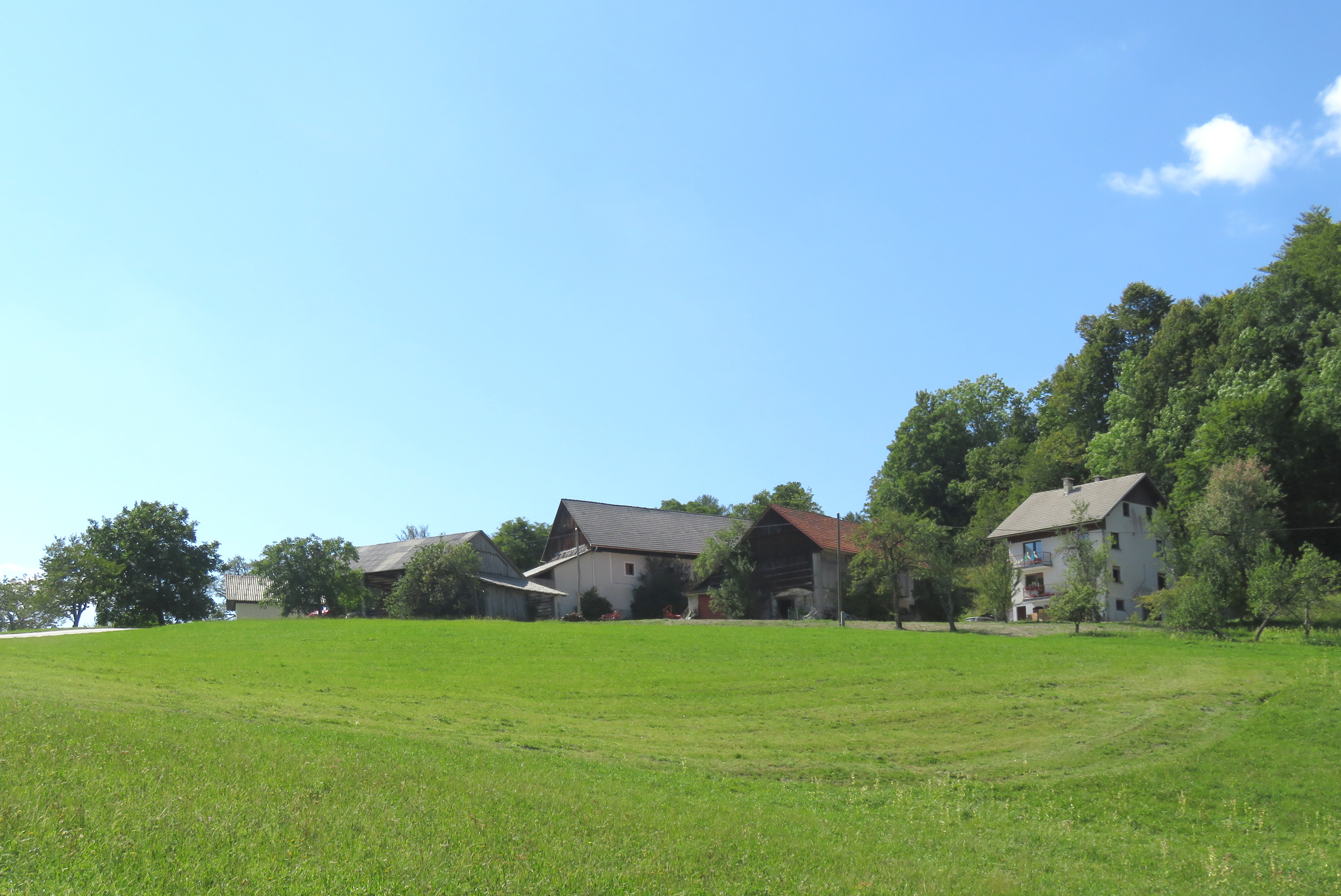

- Location in Slovenia
- Coordinates: 46°8′56.26″N 14°7′57.53″E
- Country: Slovenia
- Traditional region: Upper Carniola
- Statistical region: Upper Carniola
- Municipality: Gorenja Vas–Poljane

Area
  - Total: 2.04 km^{2} (0.79 sq mi)
- Elevation: 880.9 m (2,890 ft)

Population (2020)
  - Total: 7
  - Density: 3.4/km^{2} (8.9/sq mi)

Jelovica (pronounced [jɛˈlɔːʋitsa] or [jɛˈloːʋitsa]) is a small dispersed settlement below the eastern slopes of Mount Blegoš in the Municipality of Gorenja Vas–Poljane in the Upper Carniola region of Slovenia.
