= Gorenja Vas, Gorenja Vas–Poljane =

Gorenja Vas
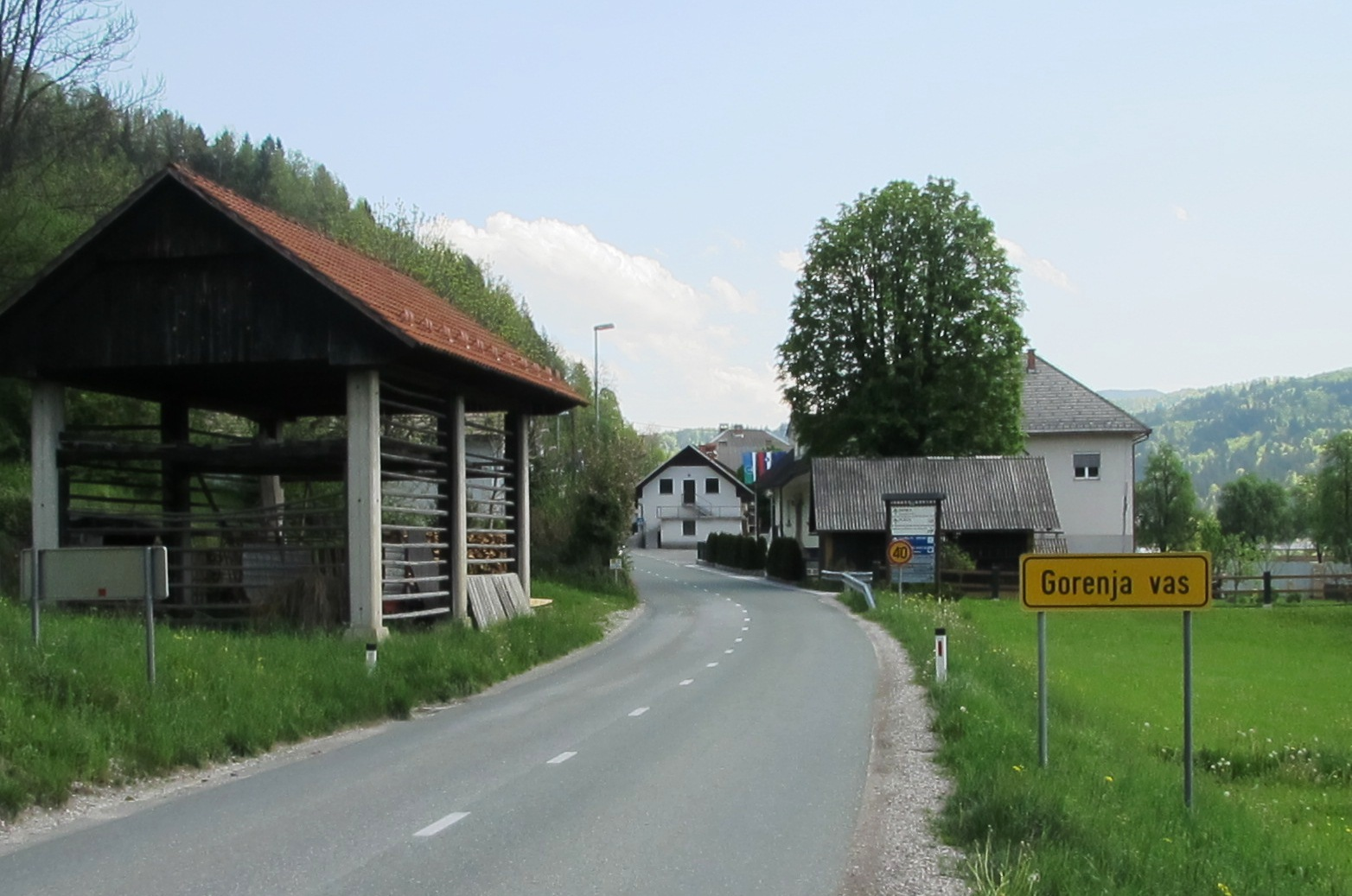
- Gorenja Vas

- Flag Coat of arms

- Location in Slovenia
- Coordinates: 46°6′24.68″N 14°8′42.28″E
- Country: Slovenia
- Traditional region: Upper Carniola
- Statistical region: Upper Carniola
- Municipality: Gorenja Vas–Poljane

Area
  - Total: 5.9 km^{2} (2.3 sq mi)
- Elevation: 423.7 m (1,390 ft)

Population (2020)
  - Total: 1,132
  - Density: 190/km^{2} (500/sq mi)

Gorenja Vas (pronounced [ɡɔˈɾeːnja ˈʋaːs]; Slovene: Gorenja vas, German: Goreinawas) is a settlement in the Poljane Sora Valley and the administrative centre of the Municipality of Gorenja Vas–Poljane in the Upper Carniola region of Slovenia. In addition to the settlement core of Gorenja Vas itself, the settlement also consists of the hamlets of Sestranska Vas (Slovene: Sestranska vas) north of the Poljane Sora River, and Trata and Lajše south of the settlement core.

== Religious heritage ==
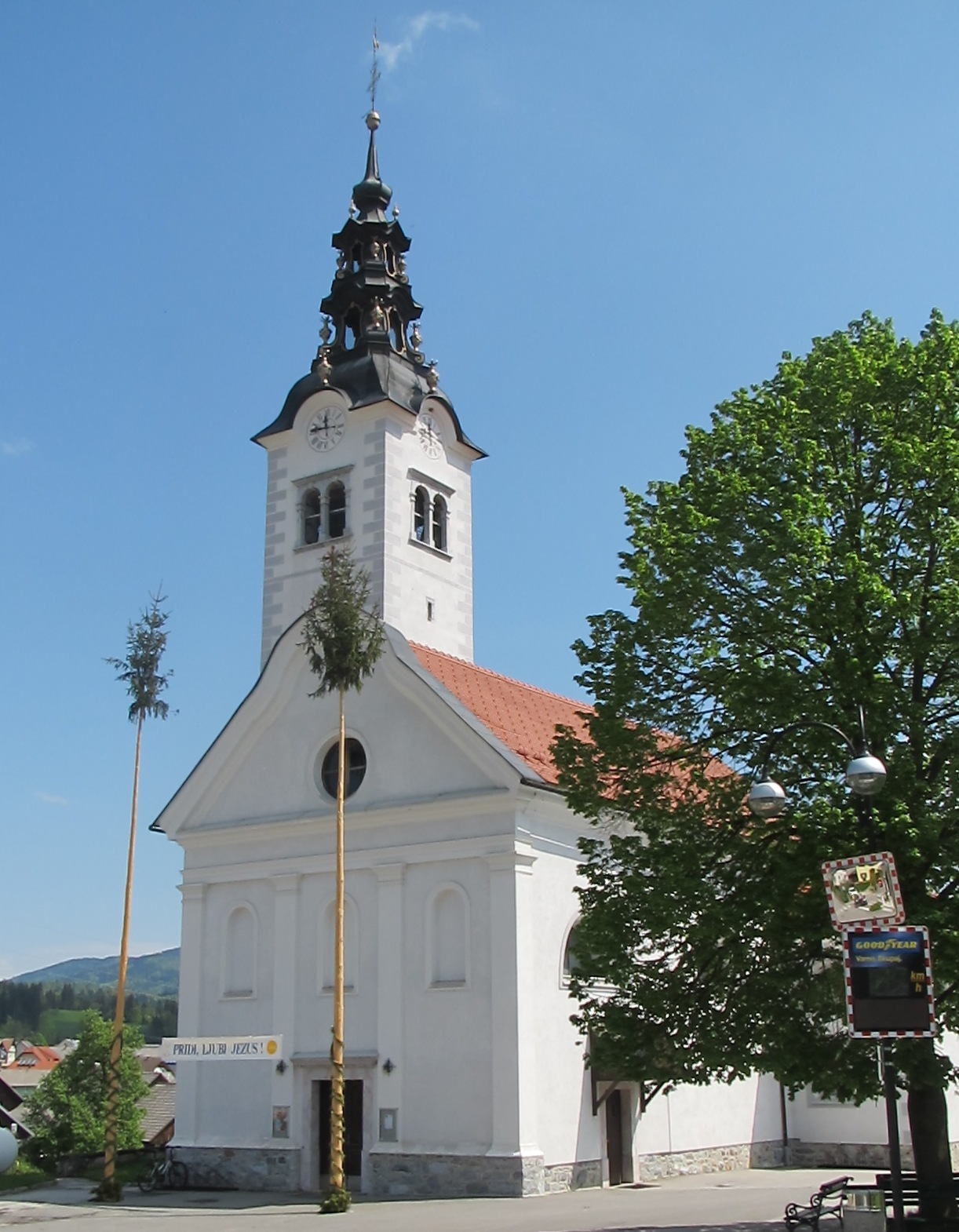
Saint John the Baptist Church

The parish church is dedicated to the martyrdom of Saint John the Baptist. It dates to the second half of the 17th century and was built on the site of a smaller chapel. It was remodeled in the 18th century, when the nave was extended, the side chapels were walled in, and the current belfry and main facade were created. Paintings dating to circa 1700 decorate the nave and presbytery. The main altar is late Baroque; it has been reworked several times and has paintings by Janez Wolf (1825–1884) and Matija Bradaška (1852–1915).

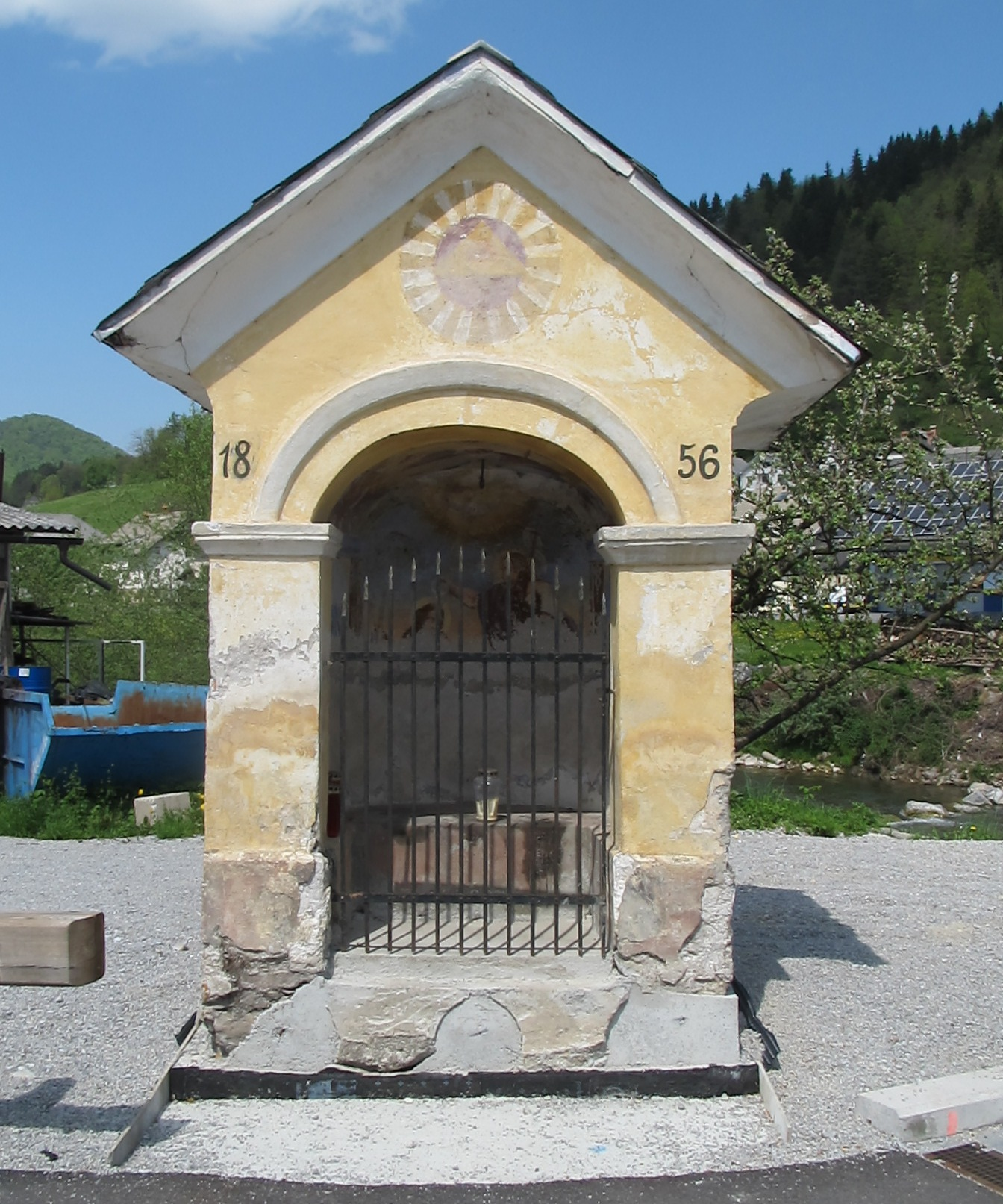
Shrine on the Poljane Sora River

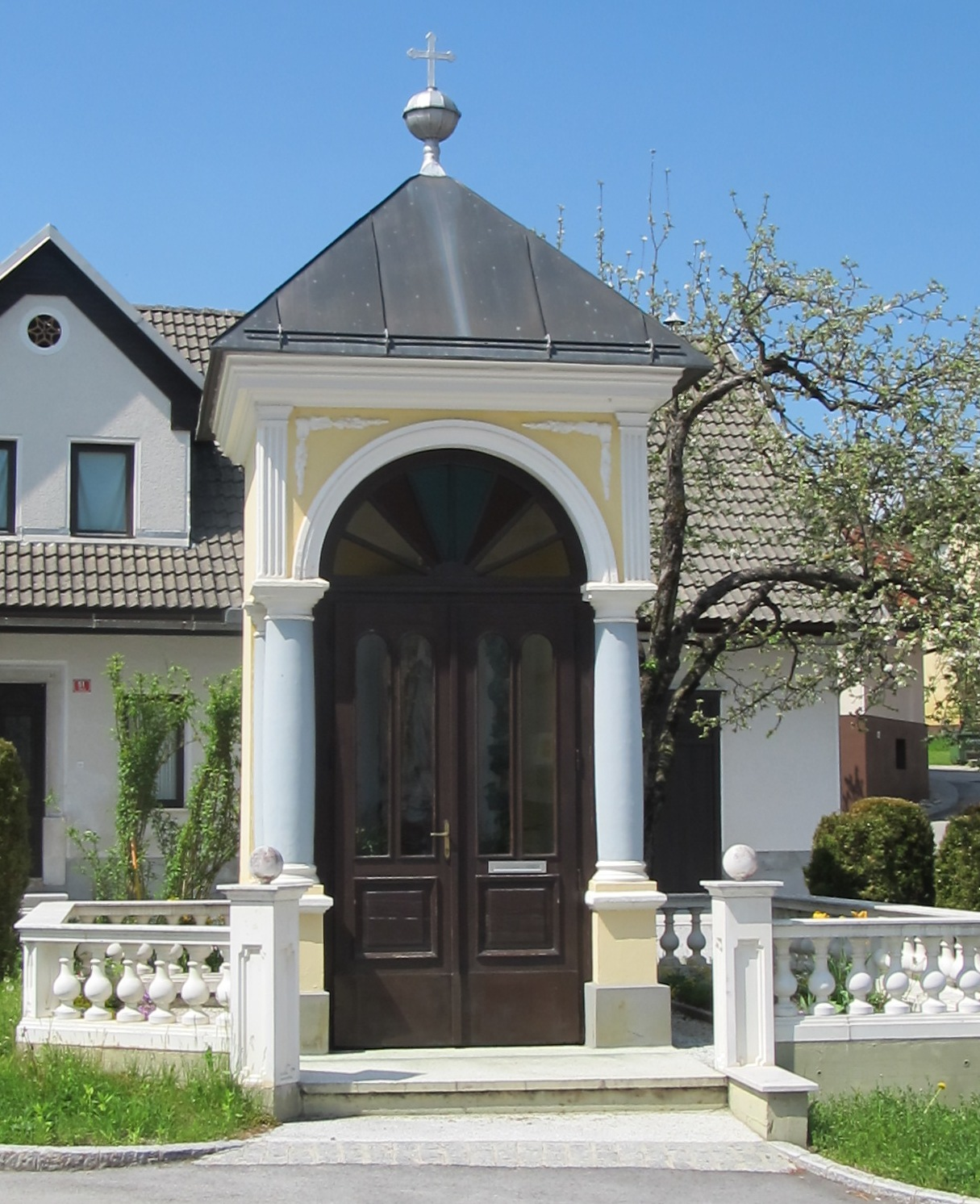
Shrine opposite the parish church

== Notable people ==
Notable people that were born or lived in Gorenja Vas include:

- Anton Dolinar (sl) (1894–1953), musician, born in Trata
- Ignacij Oblak (1834–1916), wood carver and gilder
- Ivan Poljanec (1855–1933), wood carver
- Ivan Regen (1868–1947), biologist, born in Lajše
