= Idrija lace =

Type of bobbin tape lace from Slovenia

Bobbin lacemaking in Slovenia
- UNESCO Intangible Cultural Heritage
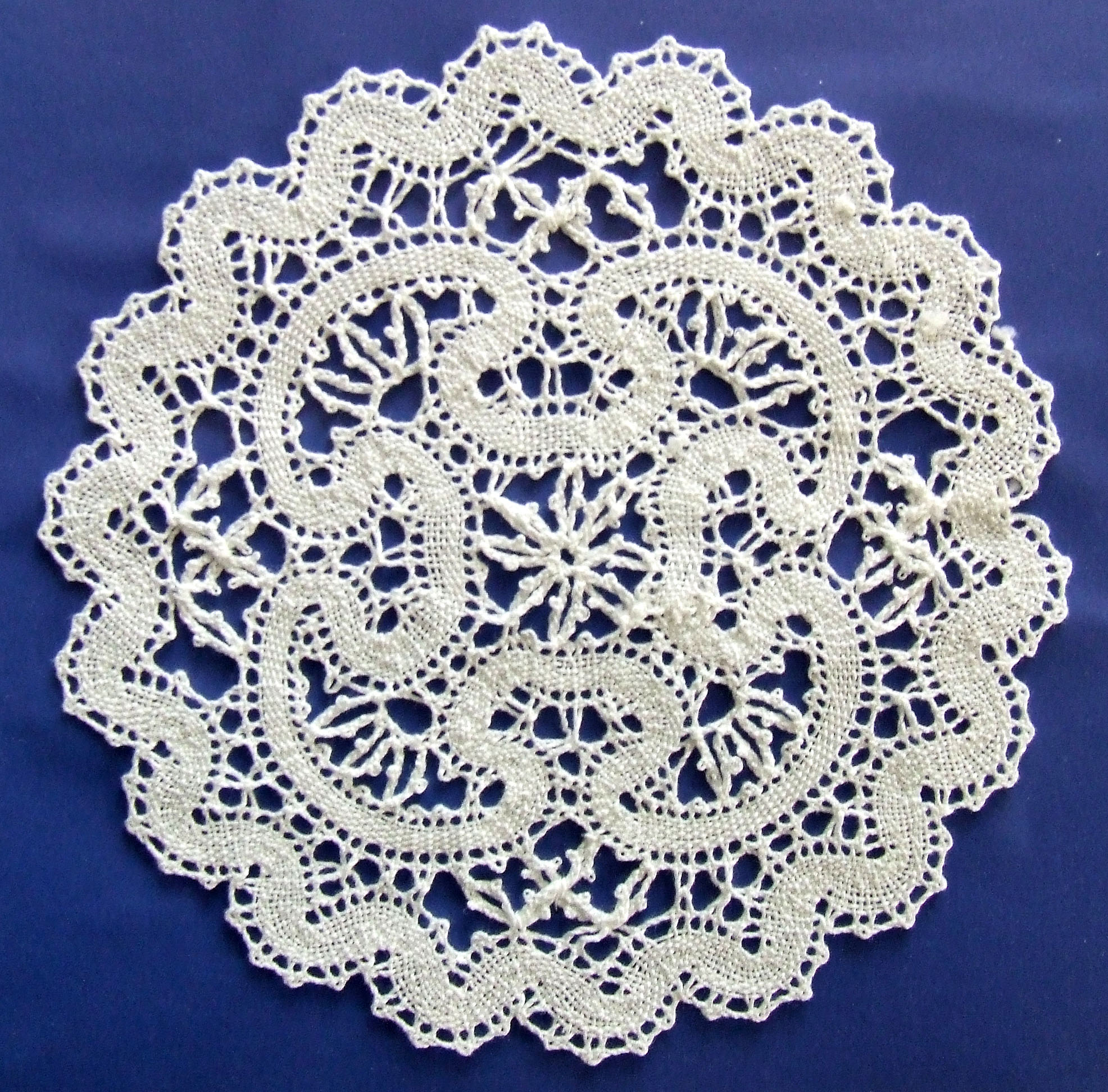
- A doily made from Idrija lace
- Country: Slovenia
- Domains: Traditional craftsmanship
- Reference: 01378
- Region: Europe and North America

Inscription history
- Inscription: 2018 (13th session)
- List: Representative

Idrija lace is a bobbin tape lace, native to Slovenia, and plays an important part in the Slovenian cultural heritage. The lace was named after the town of Idrija, the main and oldest Slovenian lacemaking center where Idrija lace has been made for centuries and where the renowned Idrija Lace School is located and continually operates since 1876. On August 10, 2000, Idrija lace was registered under protected geographical indication by the Slovenian Intellectual Property Office in Ljubljana. Moreover, bobbin lacemaking in Slovenia was inscribed on the Representative List of the Intangible Cultural Heritage of Humanity by UNESCO in 2018.

Idrija lace is distinguishable by a set of lacemaking techniques that have been adapted and enriched through time and also by patterns that were given folk names; for example, srčkovke (hearts), potonke (peonies), and zibke (cradles). The most distinctive technique of Idrija lace is the tape which is traditionally made with six to eight pairs of bobbins. There are two types of the tape; broad tape, predominantly used during the Austro-Hungarian period, and narrow tape (also called Idrija tape), developed under Italian influence after the World War I.

== History ==
Idrija lace

=== 17th–20th century ===
Idrija laces were mainly used by the middle class because they were very hard-wearing since the beginning. Lacemaking trade began at the end of the 17th century when miners started to lose work in the Idrija Mercury Mine. Idrija lace became famous all over the world when Franc Lapajne started a lace trading business in 1875 and successfully exported laces across Europe and America. In 1876 the Idrija Lace School was opened by Ivanka Ferjančič and other lacemakers. Many important lacemakers and designers were taught there like Marija Reven and Leopoldina Pehlan.

Until the collapse of Austria-Hungary the sales of laces flourished since the lacemakers had received great international recognition. During the World War I the sales dropped significantly and, in the aftermath, Idrija was occupied by Italy, thus Idrija lace also had to adapt by shifting its main market from Germany to Italy. Following the World War II the sales of laces dropped due to the decline of the mine. In addition, the Vocational Lace School in Idrija was closed.

=== Modern Idrija lace ===
Nowadays, Idrija laces are being sold mostly as souvenirs. The Idrija Lace Festival takes place every summer in Idrija. Lacemakers today are predominantly retirees and young girls, who are enrolled in the Idrija Lace School as their pastime activity. The Idrija Lacemakers' Association has been continuously educating its members (currently, there are around 130) since 2003 and has organized annual lace exhibitions. The association is known on an international level by a successful online initiative that is held before Christmas and Easter since 2020.

There are numerous descendants of Franc Lapajne, including Darja Lapajne and Vanda Lapajne, who strive to preserve their family tradition and lacemaking tradition in general. Recently, the collaboration of lacemakers and the Faculty of Natural Sciences and Engineering at the University of Ljubljana seems to have made some progress towards a modern and designer Idrija lace.

== Production ==
The lace is made using thread-wound bobbins and a lace pattern (a pencil-drawn motif) that is fixed on a cylindrical lacemaking pillow which is placed in a shallow basket. The tape is made with bobbins at the same time as the rest of the lace, curving back on itself, and joined using a crochet hook. In addition, pins and scissors must be used.

== See also ==
- Marija Reven
- Leopoldina Pelhan
- Antonija Thaler
- Frančiška Giacomelli Gantar
