= Blegoš =

Mountain in Slovenia

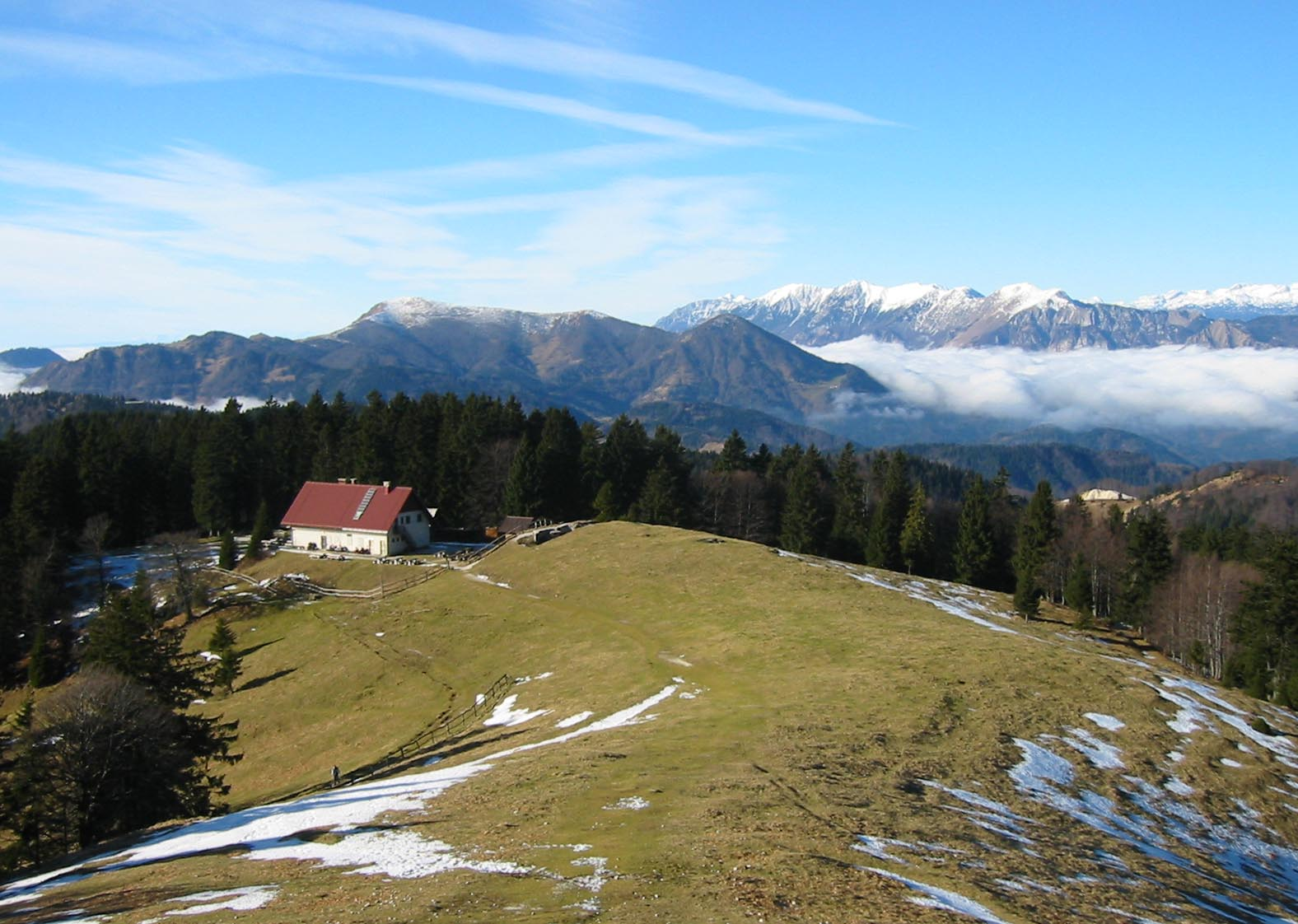
- View from the summit

Highest point
- Elevation: 1,562 m (5,125 ft)
- Coordinates: 46.164854°N 14.113490°E

Geography
- Location: Škofja Loka Hills, Slovenia
- Parent range: Slovenian Prealps

Climbing
- Easiest route: From Gorenja Žetina

Blegoš, with an elevation of 1,562 metres (5,125 ft), is the second-highest peak in the Škofja Loka Hills of Upper Carniola (northwestern Slovenia), after Mount Altemaver on the Ratitovec Ridge. From the summit it is possible to see the highest Slovenian mountain groups in the Julian Alps, the Karawanks, and the Kamnik–Savinja Alps.

== Name ==
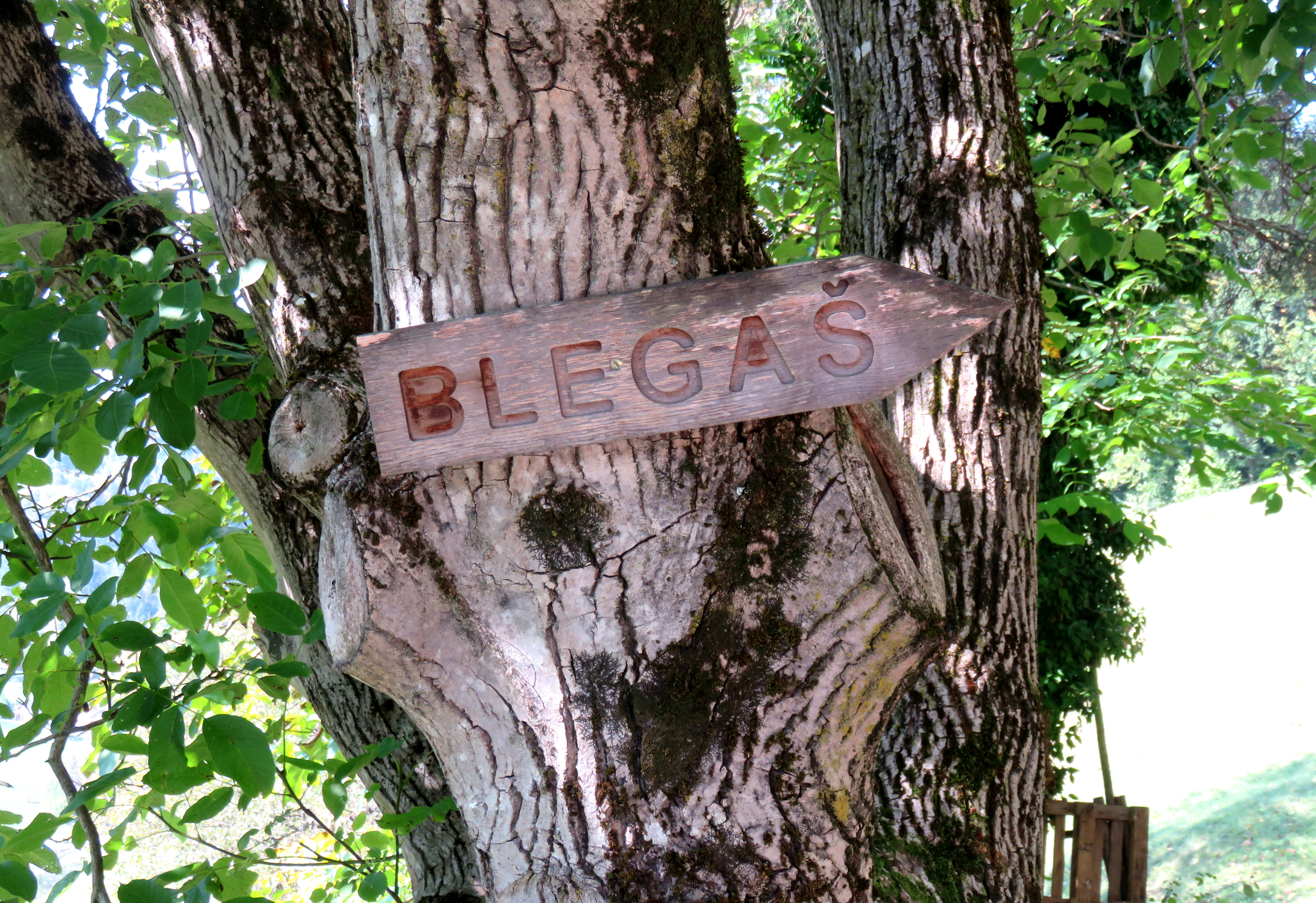
Sign for Mount Blegoš (spelled Blegaš) in Čabrače

Blegoš was attested in historical records as Bligosh and Bligos in 1763–1787. In the local dialect, it is known as Bliegaš. The name Blegoš is a clipped borrowing from the German name Fleherskofel (a compound of Fleher 'suppliant, petitioner' and Kofel 'mountain with a rounded top').

== See also ==
- Dolenja Žetina
- Jelovica, Gorenja Vas–Poljane
