= Gorenja Žetina =

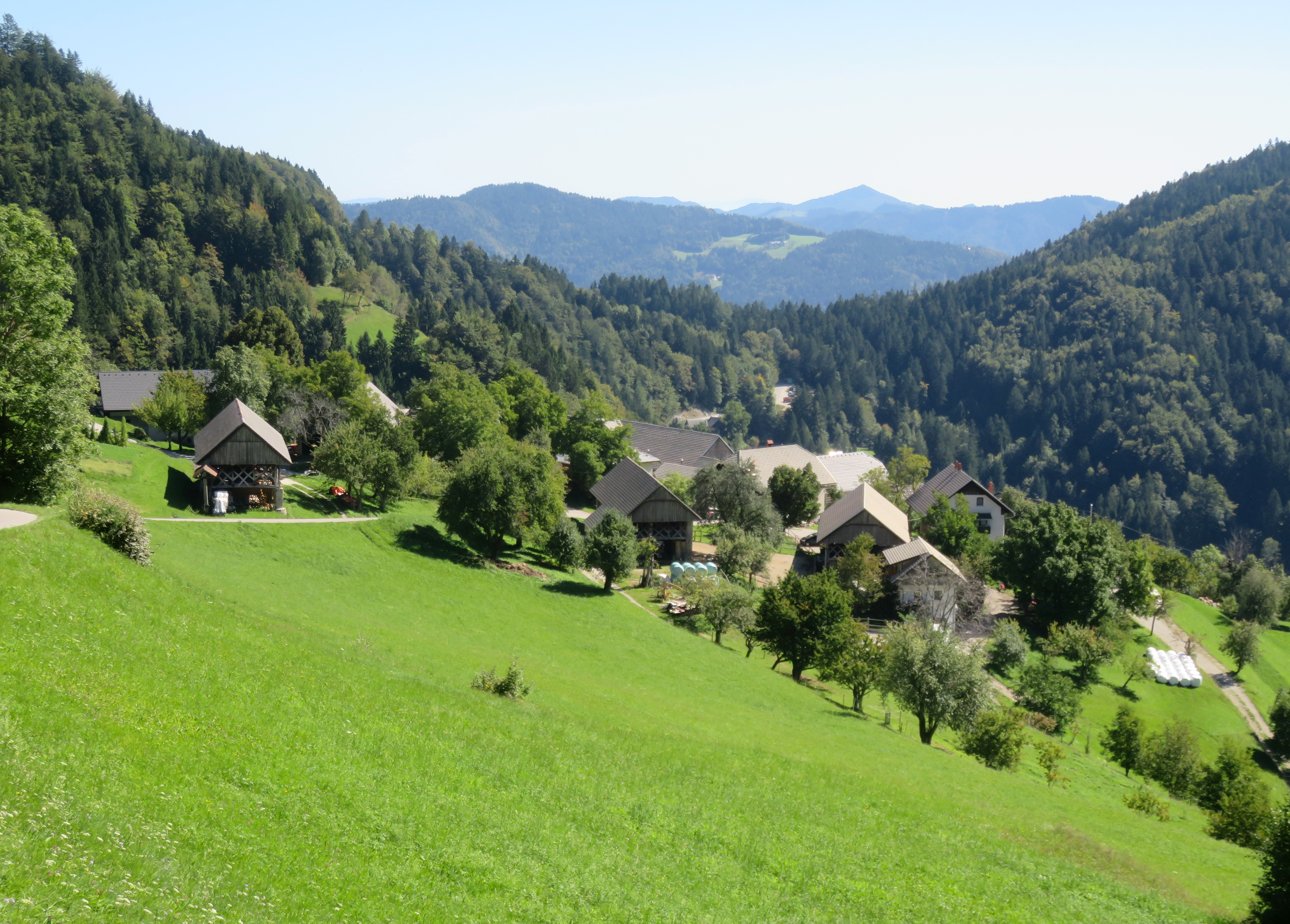

- Location in Slovenia
- Coordinates: 46°10′0.66″N 14°8′32.88″E
- Country: Slovenia
- Traditional region: Upper Carniola
- Statistical region: Upper Carniola
- Municipality: Gorenja Vas–Poljane
- Elevation: 924.6 m (3,033 ft)

Population (2020)
  - Total: 59

Gorenja Žetina (pronounced [ɡɔˈɾeːnja ʒɛˈtiːna]) is a small settlement in the Municipality of Gorenja Vas–Poljane in the Upper Carniola region of Slovenia. It lies at the foot of Mount Blegoš and is a somewhat popular starting point for hikes to its peak.
