= City Museum of Ljubljana =

Museum in Ljubljana, Slovenia

Coordinates: 46°2′49.26″N 14°30′14.60″E

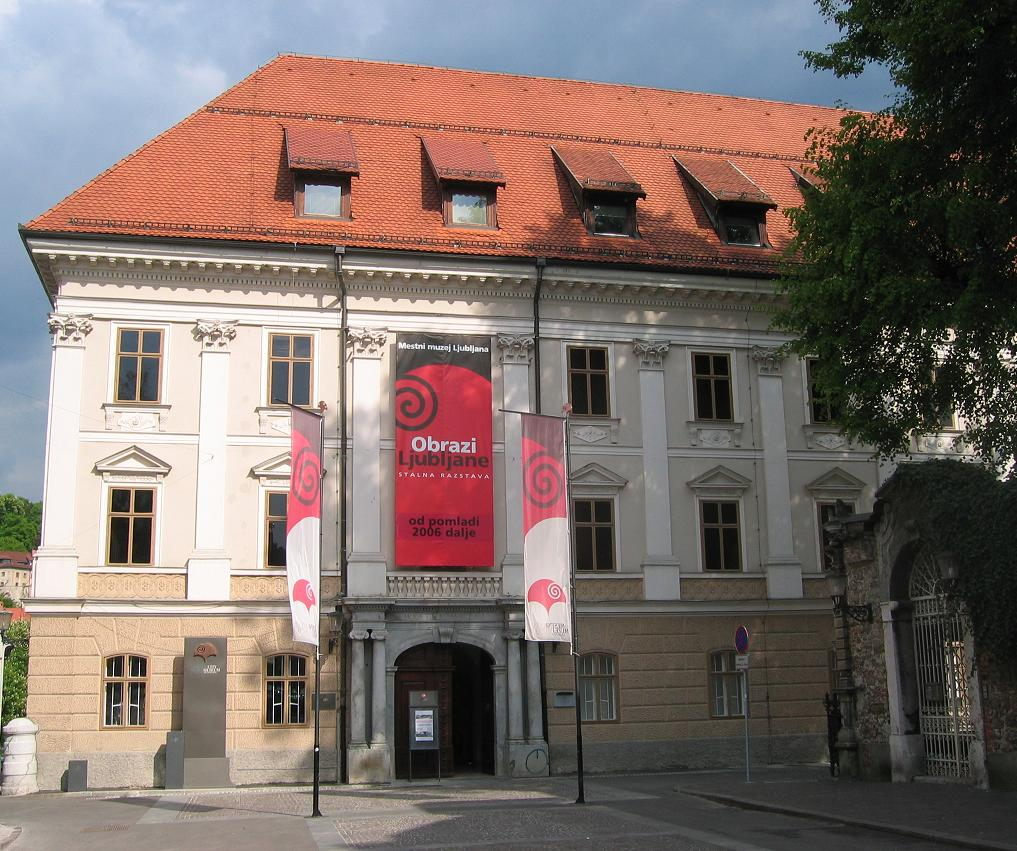
Turjak Palace, the seat of the museum

The City Museum of Ljubljana (Slovene: Mestni muzej Ljubljana) was established in 1935. It is housed in Turjak Palace at 15 Gentry Street (Gosposka ulica 15) in the centre of Ljubljana.

The museum offers various pedagogical activities for children and students between the ages of 5 and 18 and also features a special itinerant museum groups for hospital schools, schools for learners with special needs and lower graders of the remote schools around Ljubljana.

== Archeological excavations ==
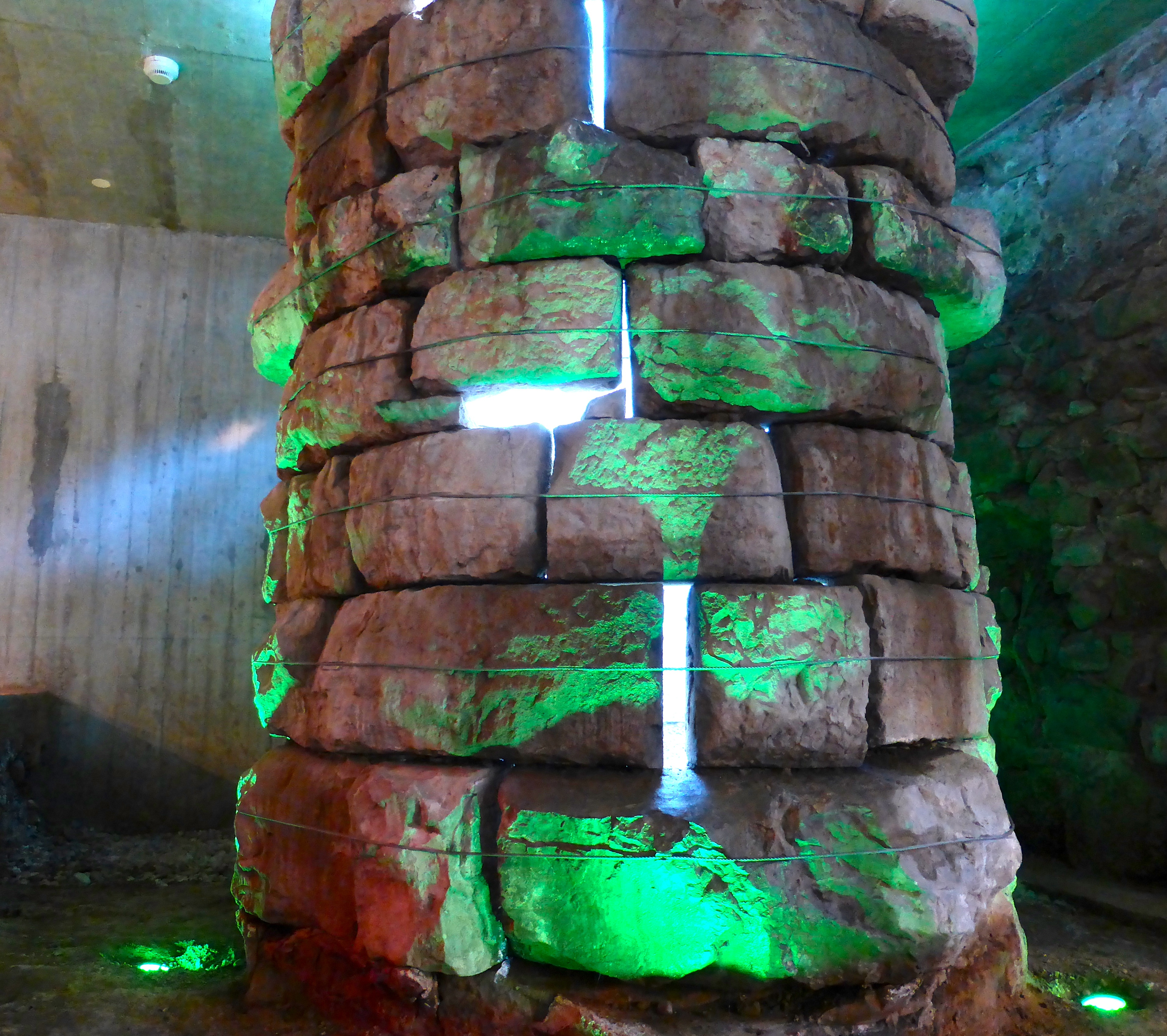
An in-situ preserved Ancient Roman well in the museum

Several archeological excavations have taken place at the site of the museum itself. Excavations were conducted between 2000 and 2003 during renovations on the Palace (in the basement and in the inner courtyard) under the direction of the City Museum curator. These revealed many historical artifacts and remains from the Urnfield Culture, the Late Hallstatt period, the Middle and Late La Tène period, the Roman Imperial period, the Late Medieval period and the Early Modern periods. Of note were two graves of La Tène warriors that were discovered in an Early Roman in-fill deposit during the investigation in 2002.
