= Smrečje, Vrhnika =

Smrečje
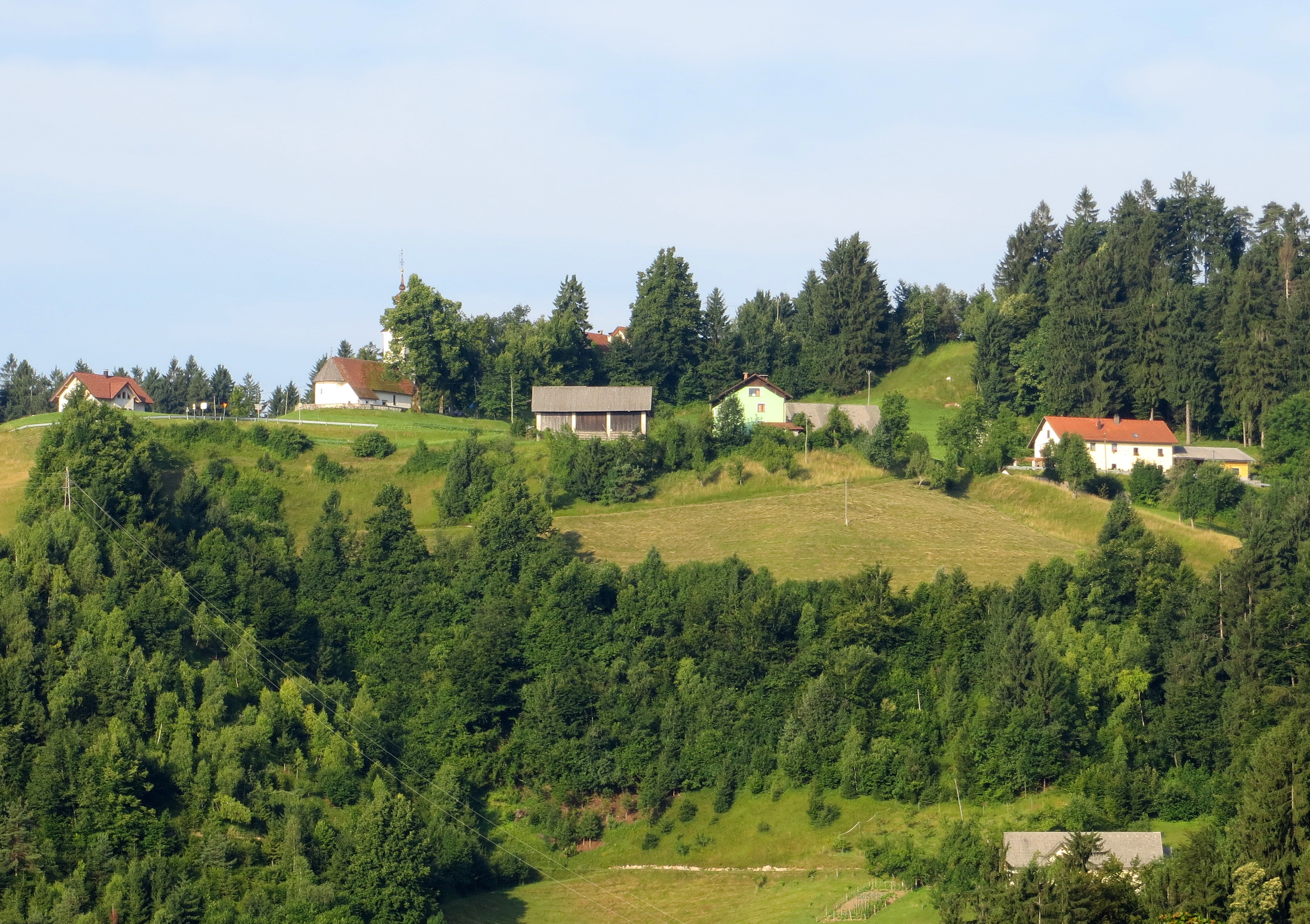
- Smrečje

- Location in Slovenia
- Coordinates: 46°0′53.31″N 14°12′27.28″E
- Country: Slovenia
- Traditional region: Inner Carniola
- Statistical region: Central Slovenia
- Municipality: Vrhnika

Area
  - Total: 6.45 km^{2} (2.49 sq mi)
- Elevation: 445.2 m (1,461 ft)

Population (2002)
  - Total: 242

Smrečje (pronounced [ˈsmɾeːtʃjɛ]) is a dispersed settlement in the hills northwest of Vrhnika in the Inner Carniola region of Slovenia. It comprises the hamlets of Celarje, Jazba, Kajndol, Samija, Spodnje Smrečje, Zgornje Smrečje, Spodnja Dolina (Slovene: Spodnja dolina), and Šuštarjev Graben (Šuštarjev graben).

== Church ==
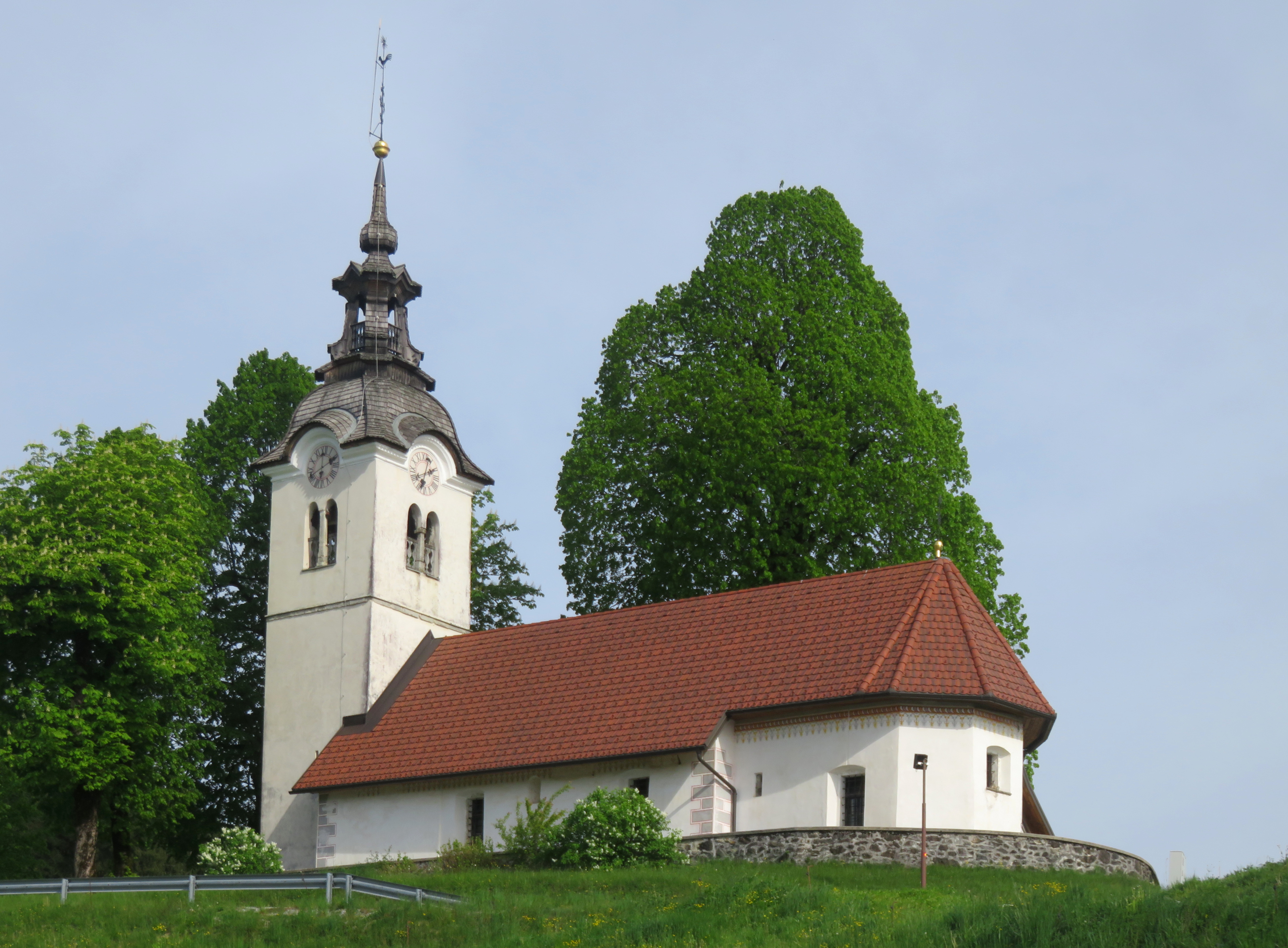
Assumption of Mary Church

The local church in the settlement is dedicated to the Assumption of Mary and belongs to the Parish of Šentjošt nad Horjulom.

== Prominenet residents ==
- Julka Gantar Fortuna (1916–1999), Slovenian farmer, poet, and lacemaker

== Gallery ==
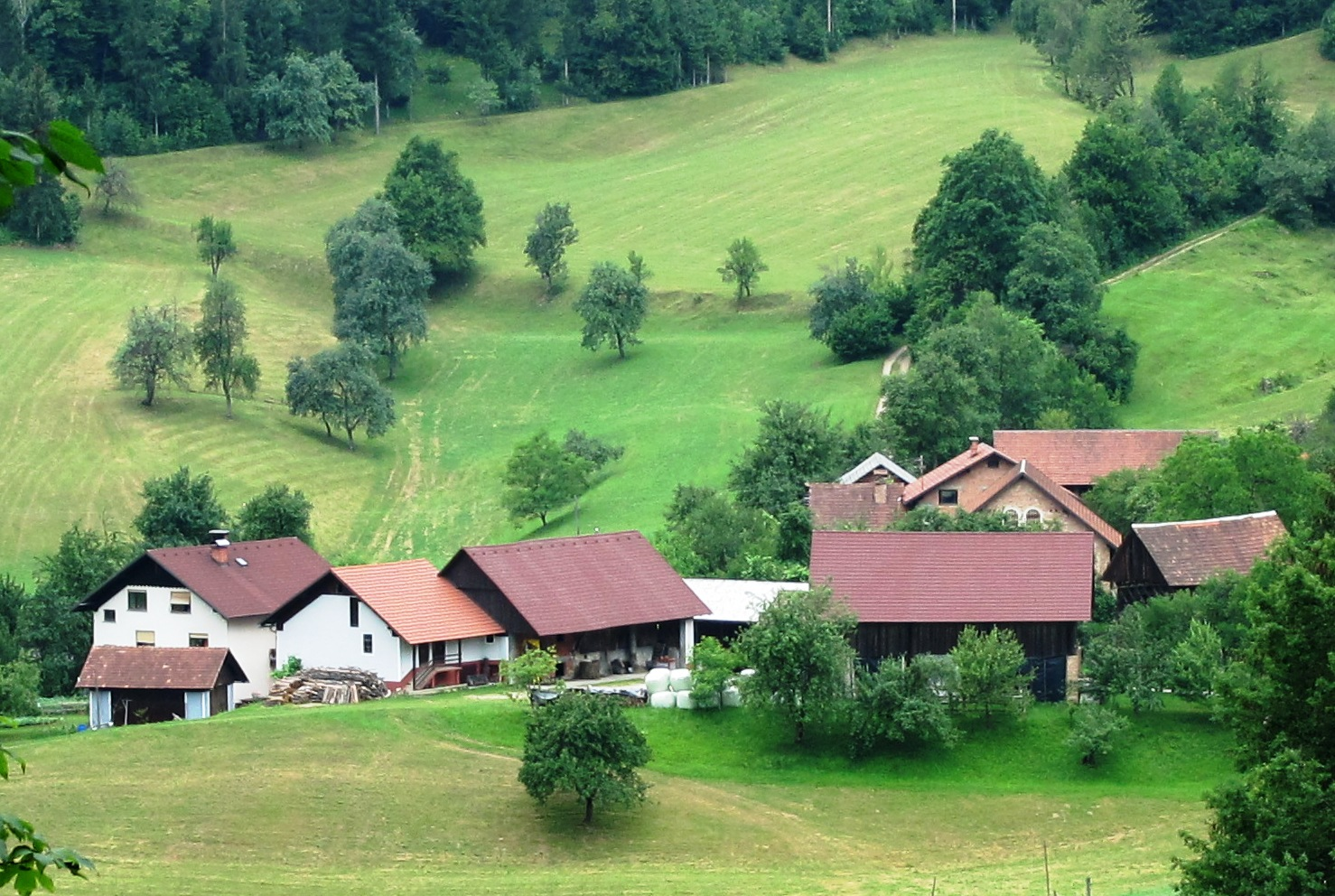
The hamlet of Kajndol in Smrečje
