= Podpleče =

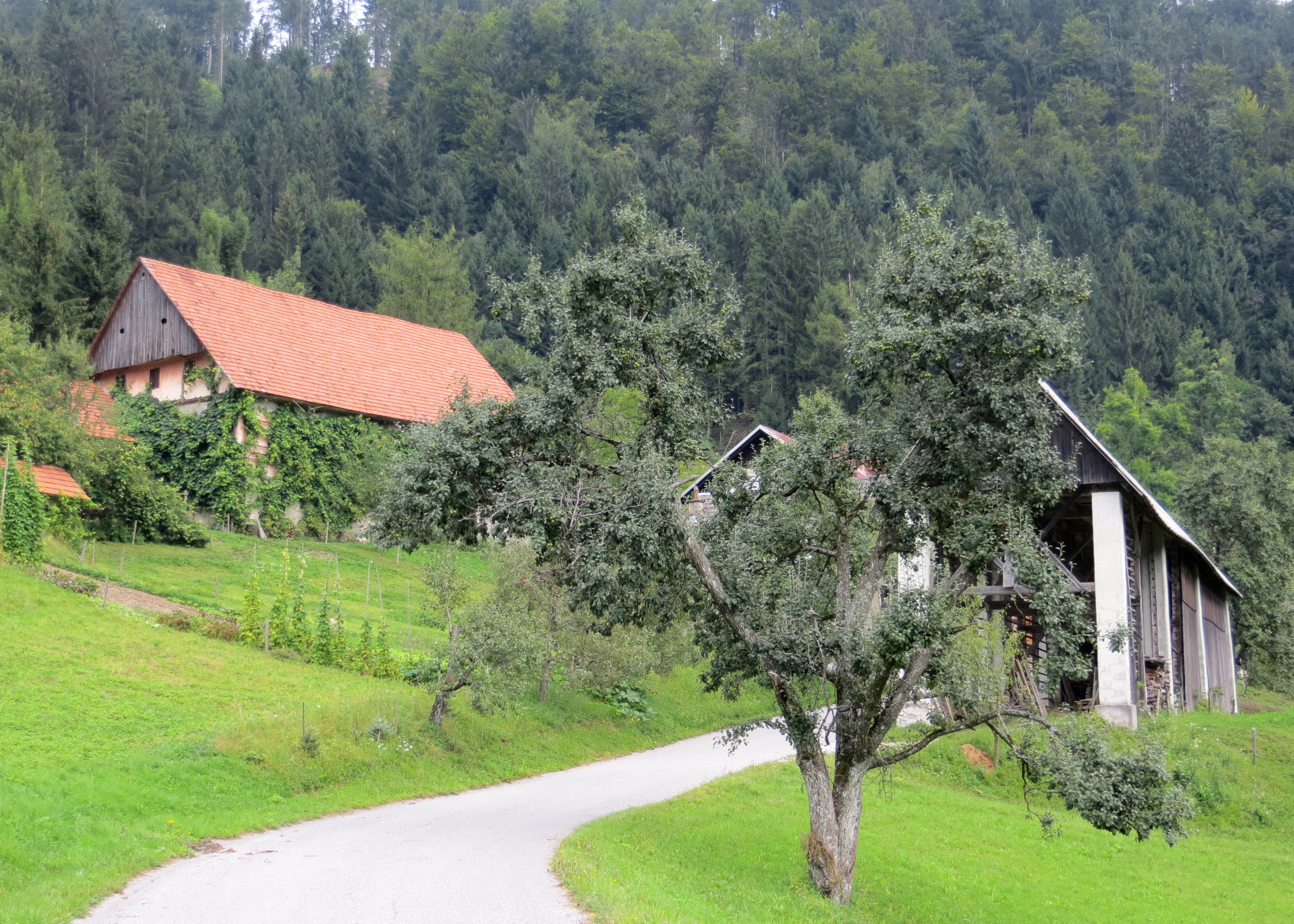
- The hamlet of Dolenc in Podpleče

- Location in Slovenia
- Coordinates: 46°7′37.48″N 14°1′46.08″E
- Country: Slovenia
- Traditional region: Littoral
- Statistical region: Gorizia
- Municipality: Cerkno

Area
  - Total: 3.41 km^{2} (1.32 sq mi)
- Elevation: 723.5 m (2,374 ft)

Population (2020)
  - Total: 25
  - Density: 7.3/km^{2} (19/sq mi)

Podpleče (pronounced [pɔtˈplɛːtʃɛ]; German: Podpletscham) is a dispersed settlement in the hills east of Cerkno in the traditional Littoral region of Slovenia.

== Geography ==
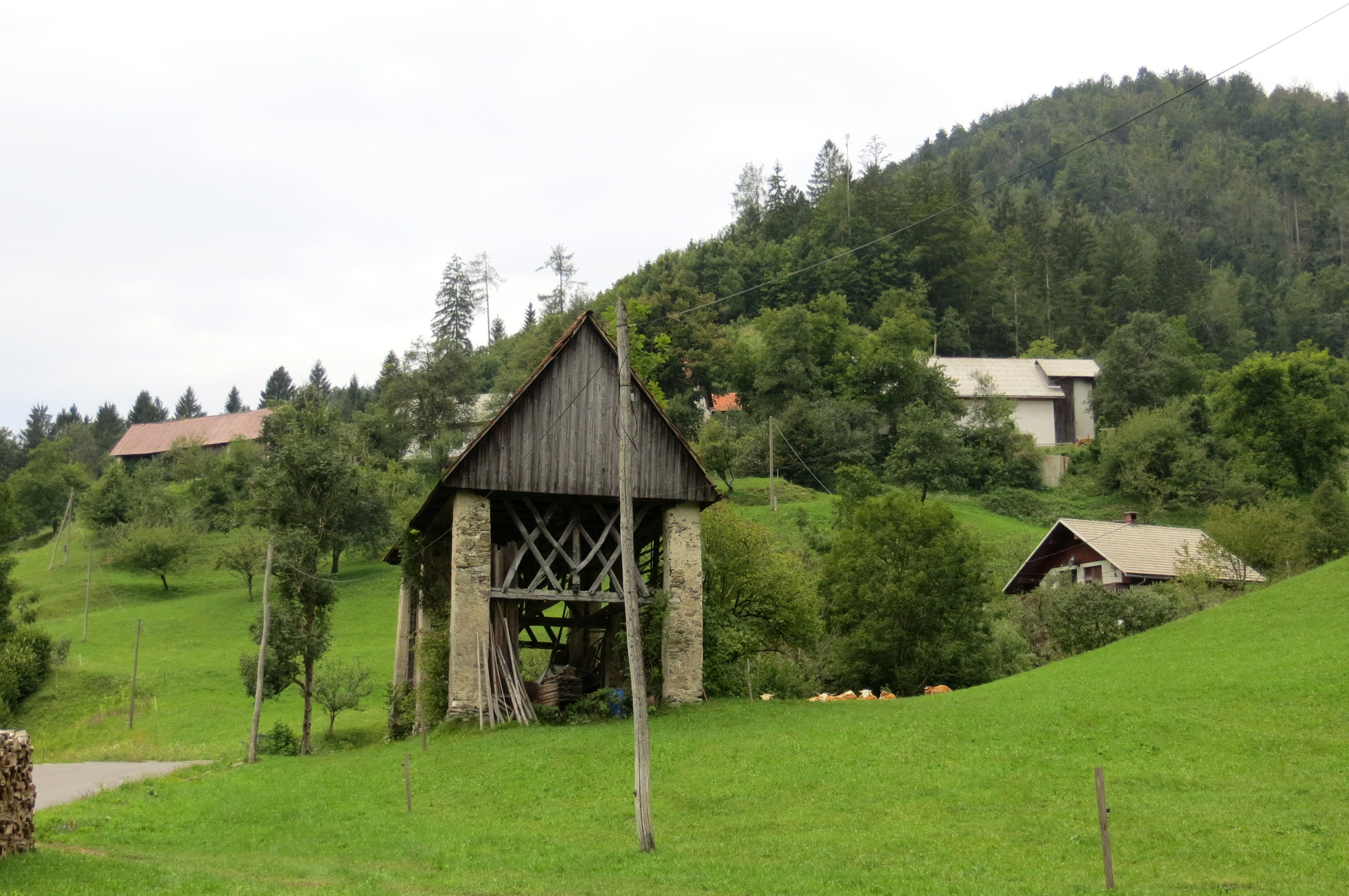
The hamlet of Kumar

Podpleče is a scattered hill settlement on the eastern edge of the Cerkno region, where the terrain descends toward Škofja Loka below a ridge dividing the watersheds of the Sora and Idrijca river basins. It includes the hamlets and isolated farmsteads of Joškovec, Kumar, Tomažek, Dolenc, Kolinc, Peter, Novine, Jeram, Na Brdu, and Mlakar. Podpleče is connected by a road from Cerkno through Planina pri Cerknem that continues east through the Kopačnica Valley to Hotavlje. Nearby elevations include Škofje Hill (974 meters or 3,196 feet) to the north and Vrhovec Hill (Slovene: Vrhovčev grič; 1,048 meters or 3,438 feet) to the south. The slopes of the hills are wooded, with hayfields and small tilled fields scattered among them.

== History ==
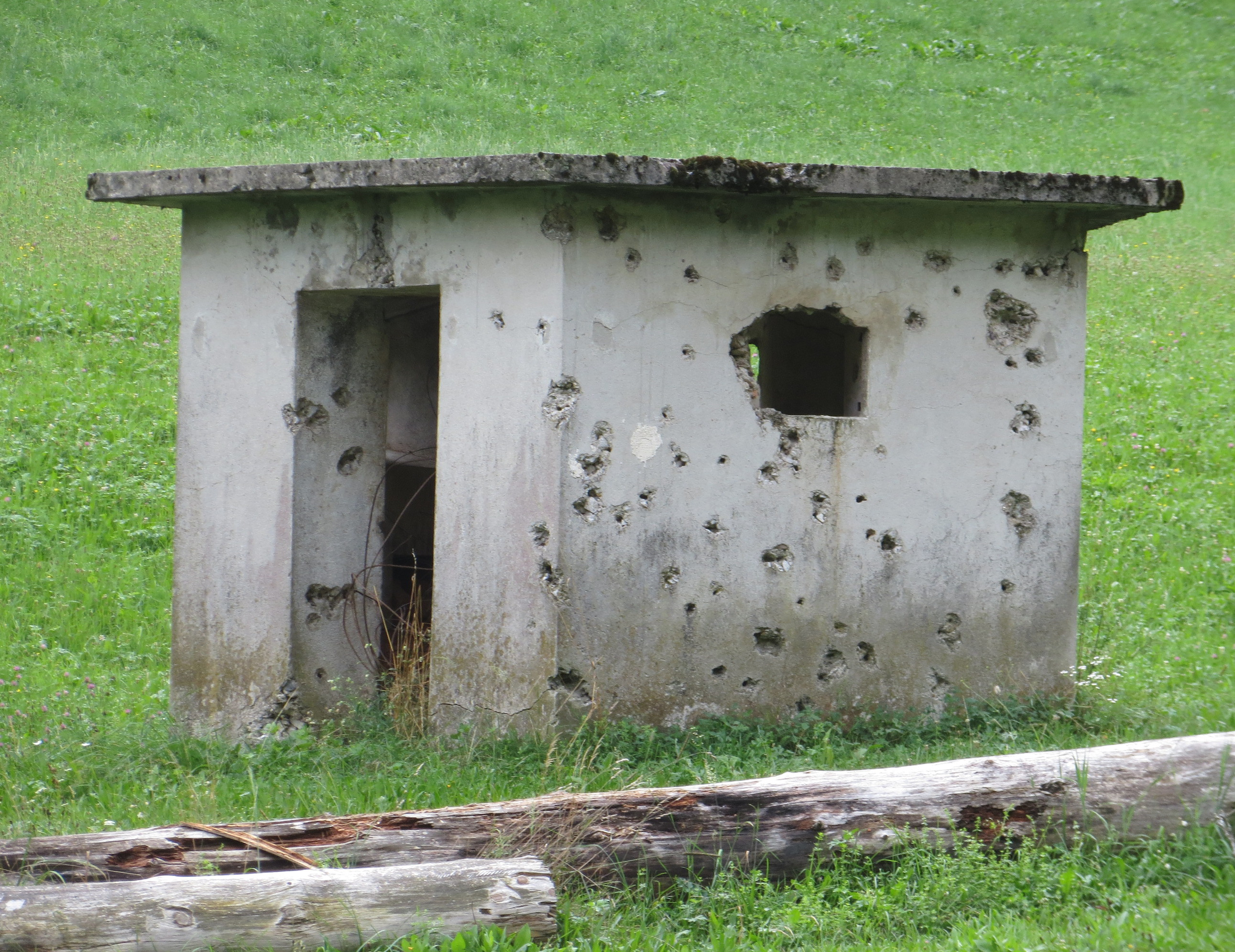
Interwar fortification in the hamlet of Tomažek

Above the farm at Jerman is a hill known as Vrata (literally, 'door'; 831 meters or 2,726 feet). It has been hypothesized that this name refers to a passage through the Roman limes, built before AD 430. The existence of a former wall is also suggested by stone that was apparently brought to the site as well as the adjacent microtoponym Za zidom (literally, 'behind the wall') in the neighboring village of Podlanišče.

In the Middle Ages, Podpleče was part of the territory of the Bishopric of Freising. During the interwar period, the village was in Italian territory, west of the Rapallo border. During the Second World War, one house in the village was destroyed in a German air raid. A former copper mine in the area closed in 1943. A dairy processing center also operated in the village but was shut down after the Second World War.

== Cultural heritage ==
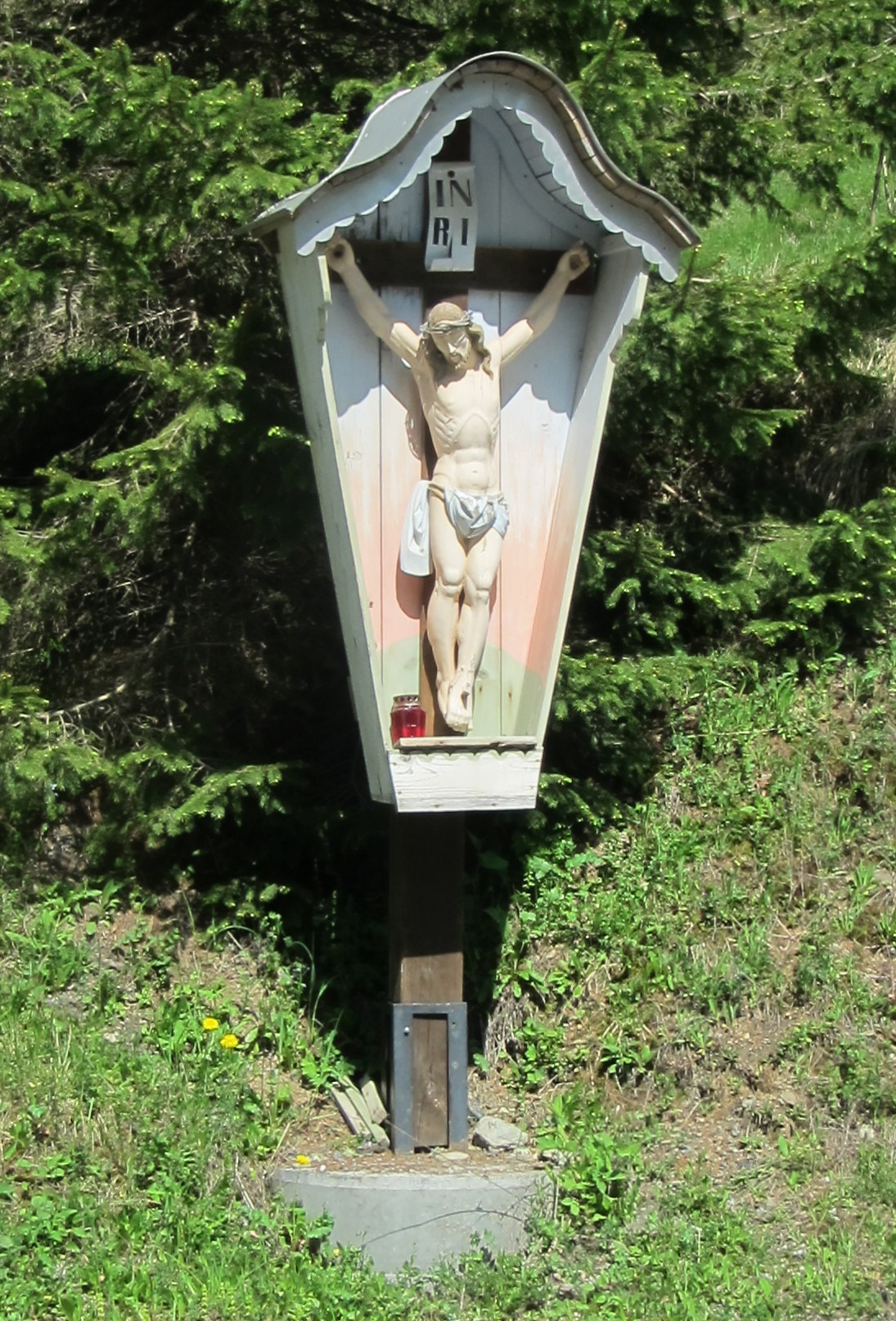
Wayside shrine in the hamlet of Joškovec

Registered cultural heritage in Podpleče includes the following:

- The farm at Podpleče no. 16, in the hamlet of Novine, consists of a two-story house, a double hayrack, a fruit-drying shed, a barn, a stone watering trough by the well, and a pigsty. The vaulted barn is supported by eight stone columns. It is an isolated farm northeast of the village core.
- A stone pillar shrine on a base with four niches stands near the farm at Podpleče no. 16. It dates to 1814.
- A wooden crucifix dating from the 19th century stands on the eastern edge of the settlement. It has a metal covering and stands near the house at Podpleče no. 11, in the hamlet of Joškovec.
