= Travnik, Cerkno =

Travnik
- Location in Slovenia
- Coordinates: 46°4′11.66″N 13°59′38.44″E
- Country: Slovenia
- Traditional region: Littoral
- Statistical region: Gorizia
- Municipality: Cerkno

Area
  - Total: 0.49 km^{2} (0.19 sq mi)
- Elevation: 286.7 m (941 ft)

Population (2020)
  - Total: 63
  - Density: 130/km^{2} (330/sq mi)

Travnik (pronounced [ˈtɾaːu̯nik]) is a small settlement on the right bank of the Idrijca River in the Municipality of Cerkno in the traditional Littoral region of Slovenia. Travnik became a settlement in 1997, when parts of Jazne and Otalež were separated and made into an independent settlement.
