= Novaki =

Novaki is the name of several villages. It may refer to

== In Croatia ==
- Novaki, Sveta Nedelja, near Sveta Nedelja, Zagreb County
- Novaki, Dubrava, near Dubrava, Zagreb County
- Novaki, Virovitica-Podravina County, near Sopje
- Novaki, Varaždin County, near Maruševec
- Novaki Bistranski, near Bistra, Zagreb County
- Novaki Bizovački, near Bizovac, Osijek-Baranja County
- Novaki Ozaljski, near Ozalj, Karlovac County
- Novaki Petrovinski, near Jastrebarsko, Zagreb County
- Novaki Ravenski, near Križevci, Koprivnica-Križevci County
- Novaki Šćitarjevski, near Velika Gorica, Zagreb County
- Kraljevečki Novaki, part of the Sesvete district of the City of Zagreb

== In Slovenia ==
- Dolenji Novaki, near Cerkno
- Gorenji Novaki, near Cerkno
