= Krog =

Krog may refer to:

- Krog, a hamlet of Sečovlje, Slovenia
- Krog, Murska Sobota, a village in Slovenia
- Krog, Cerkno, a hamlet of Cerkljanski Vrh, Slovenia
- Krog, a character from the Mixels franchise
- Krog (surname)

KROG may refer to:

- KROG, an American radio station from Oregon
- Rogers Executive Airport (ICAO code: KROG), an airport in Arkansas, US
- KROG, a Cartoon Network short
