= Laznica, Cerkno =

Laznica
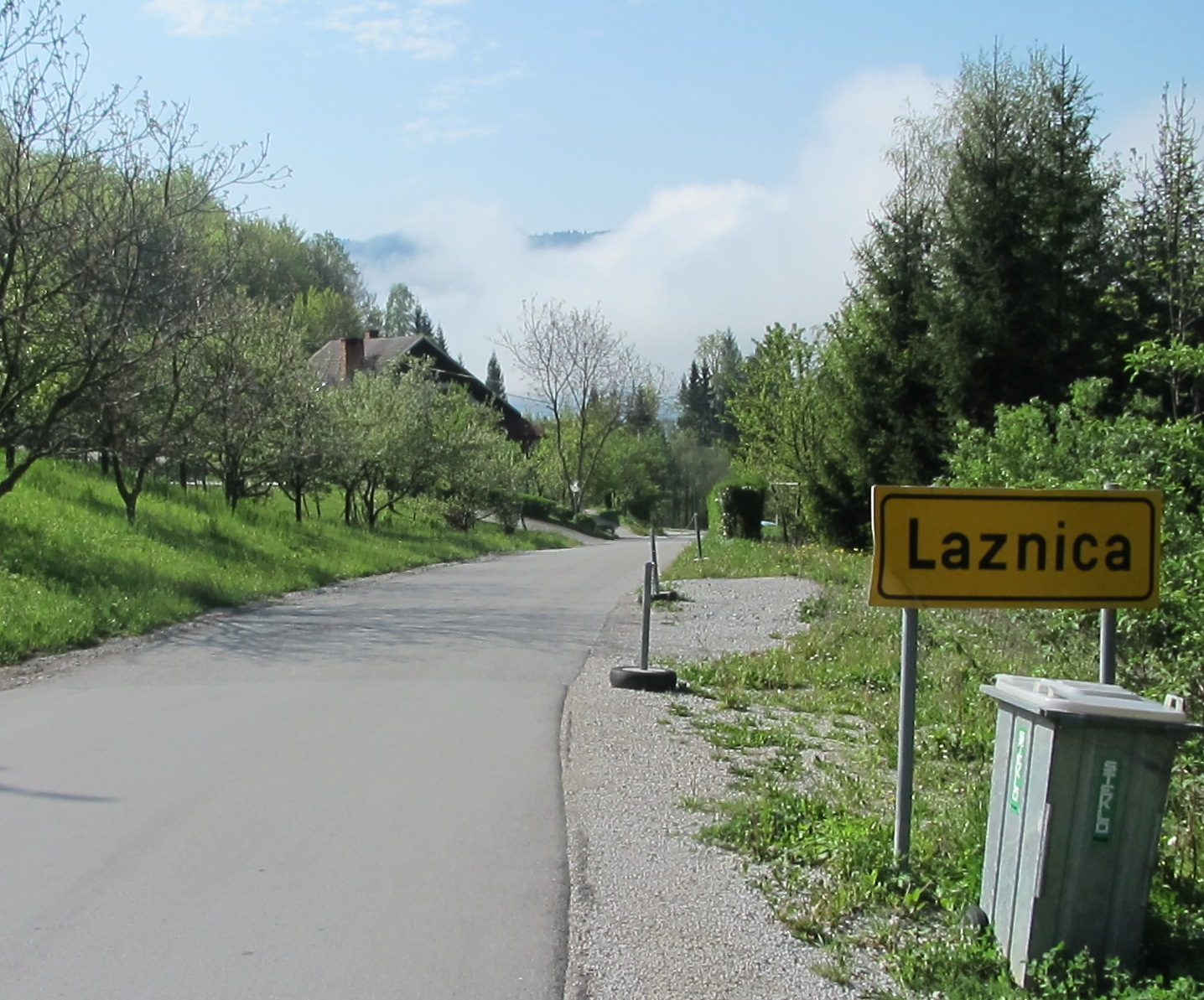

- Location in Slovenia
- Coordinates: 46°8′58.86″N 13°58′48.95″E
- Country: Slovenia
- Traditional region: Littoral
- Statistical region: Gorizia
- Municipality: Cerkno

Area
  - Total: 0.22 km^{2} (0.085 sq mi)
- Elevation: 541 m (1,775 ft)

Population (2020)
  - Total: 43
  - Density: 200/km^{2} (510/sq mi)

Laznica (pronounced [ˈlaːznitsa]) is a small settlement in the hills north of Cerkno in the traditional Littoral region of Slovenia.

== History ==
Laznica was part of Poče until 1996, when it was separated and made an independent settlement.
