= Poljane, Cerkno =

Poljane
- Location in Slovenia
- Coordinates: 46°8′43.31″N 14°0′38.75″E
- Country: Slovenia
- Traditional region: Littoral
- Statistical region: Gorizia
- Municipality: Cerkno

Area
  - Total: 3.76 km^{2} (1.45 sq mi)
- Elevation: 500.6 m (1,642 ft)

Population (2020)
  - Total: 61
  - Density: 16/km^{2} (42/sq mi)

Poljane (pronounced [pɔˈljaːnɛ]) is a small settlement on the road from Cerkno towards Dolenji Novaki in the traditional Littoral region of Slovenia.
