= Municipality of Cerkno =

Municipality of Slovenia

Municipality of Cerkno Občina Cerkno
- Municipality
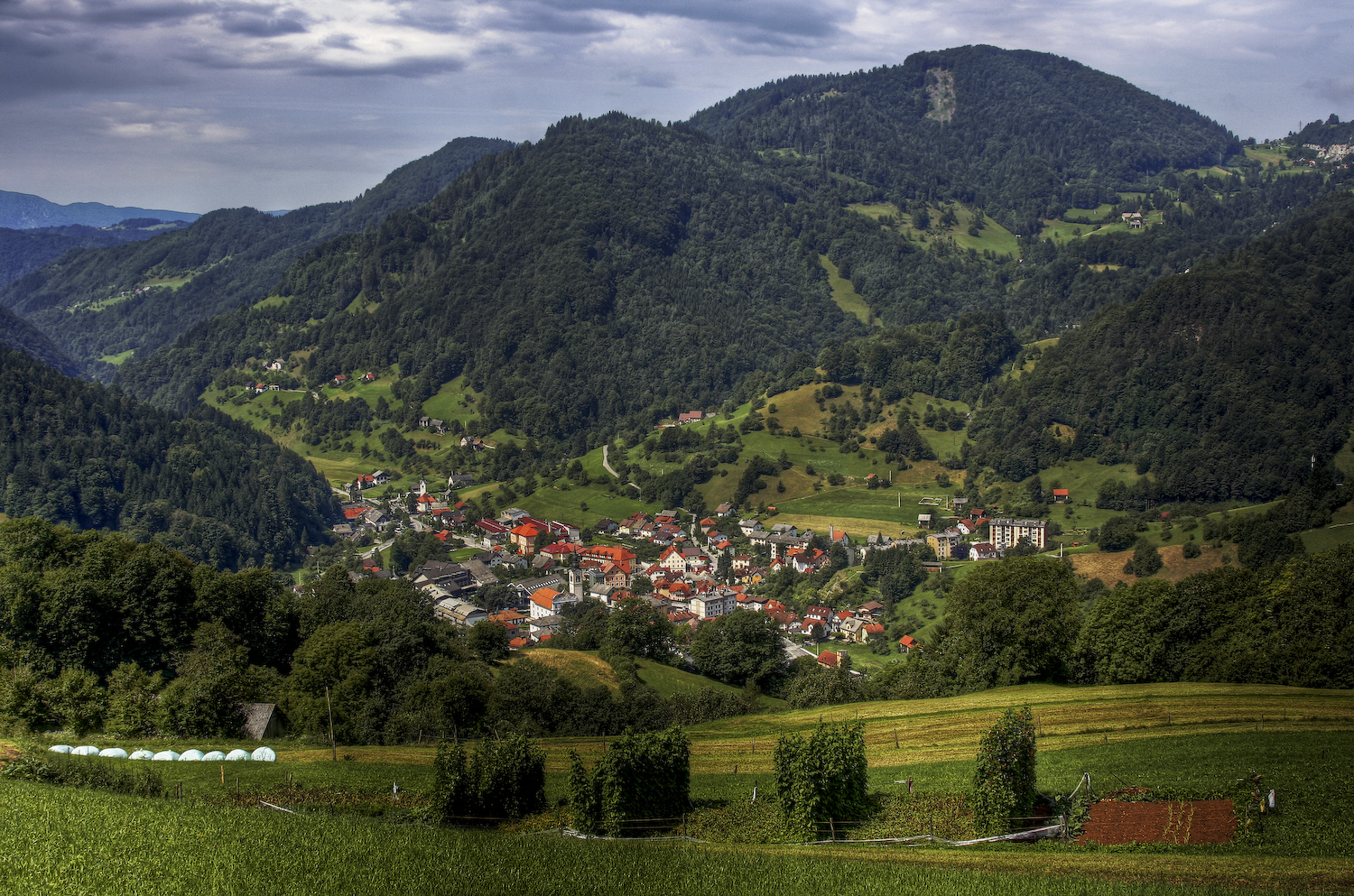

- Location of the Municipality of Cerkno in Slovenia
- Coordinates: 46°8′N 13°58′E
- Country: Slovenia

Government
  - Mayor: Gašper Uršič (SDS)

Area
  - Total: 131.6 km^{2} (50.8 sq mi)

Population (2002)
  - Total: 5,040
  - Density: 38.3/km^{2} (99.2/sq mi)
- Time zone: UTC+01 (CET)
  - Summer (DST): UTC+02 (CEST)

The Municipality of Cerkno (Slovene: Občina Cerkno) is a municipality in the Littoral region of Slovenia. The seat of the municipality is the town of Cerkno. The municipality has around 5,000 people.

== History ==
Historically, the Cerkno Hills belonged to Tolmin County. In the 16th century, the area came under Habsburg rule, and was included in the County of Gorizia and Gradisca. After the end of World War I, the area was occupied by the Italian Army, and then officially annexed to Italy in 1920. Between 1920 and 1943, it was part of the administrative region known as the Julian March. After the Italian armistice in September 1943, Cerkno was liberated by the Yugoslav Partisans and the region became one of the most important centres of Partisan resistance in the Slovenian Littoral. In 1945, the area came under Yugoslav military administration, and in 1947 it was officially annexed to the People's Republic of Slovenia within the Federal People's Republic of Yugoslavia.

== Settlements ==
In addition to the municipal seat of Cerkno, the municipality also includes the following settlements.

- Bukovo
- Čeplez
- Cerkljanski Vrh
- Dolenji Novaki
- Gorenji Novaki
- Gorje
- Jagršče
- Jazne
- Jesenica
- Labinje
- Lazec
- Laznica
- Orehek
- Otalež
- Planina pri Cerknem
- Plužnje
- Poče
- Podlanišče
- Podpleče
- Police
- Poljane
- Ravne pri Cerknem
- Reka
- Šebrelje
- Straža
- Travnik
- Trebenče
- Zakojca
- Zakriž
