= Lazec, Cerkno =

Lazec
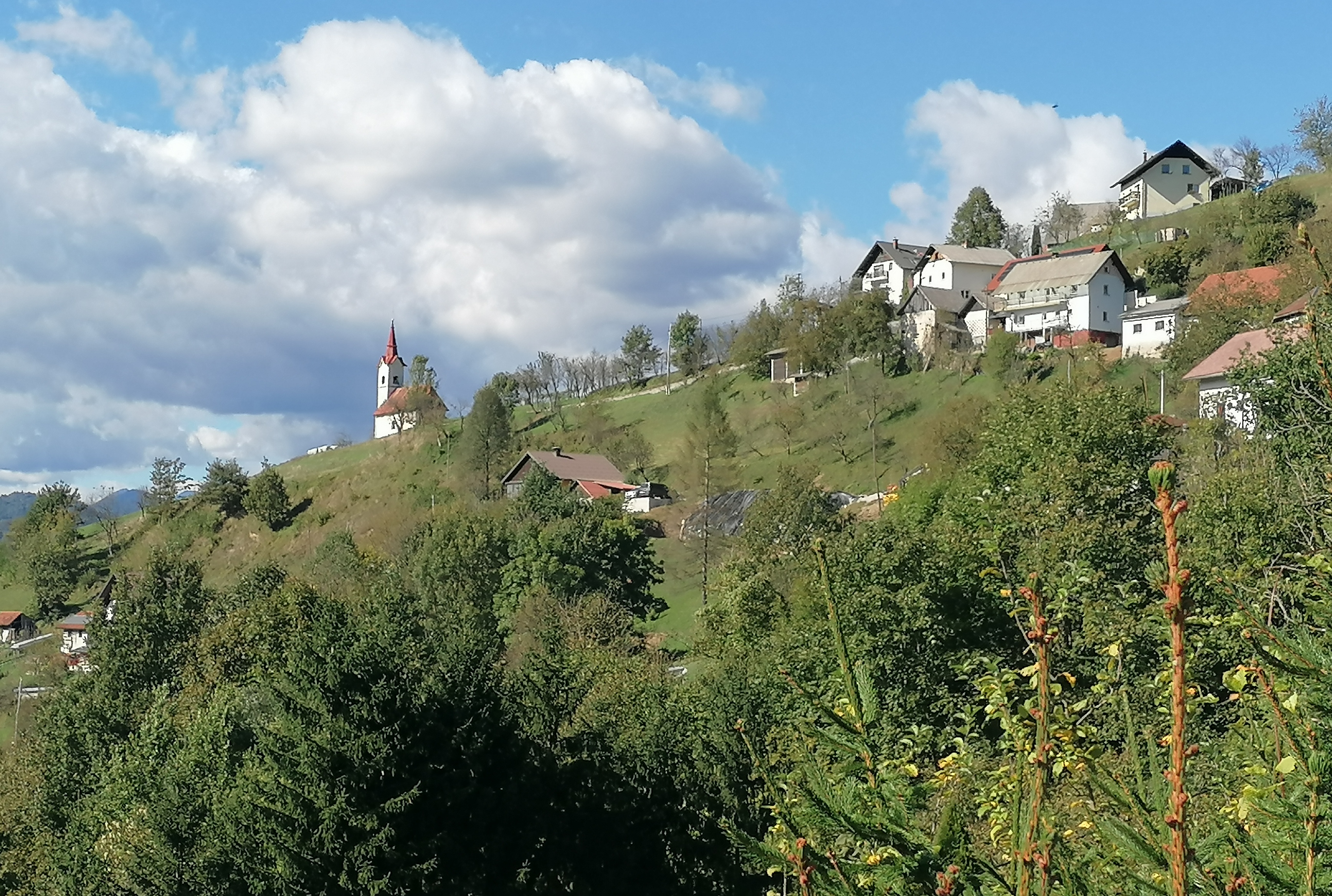

- Location in Slovenia
- Coordinates: 46°5′27.11″N 13°58′22.59″E
- Country: Slovenia
- Traditional region: Littoral
- Statistical region: Gorizia
- Municipality: Cerkno

Area
  - Total: 2.21 km^{2} (0.85 sq mi)
- Elevation: 566.5 m (1,859 ft)

Population (2020)
  - Total: 119
  - Density: 53.8/km^{2} (139/sq mi)

Lazec (pronounced [ˈlaːzəts]) is a village above the right bank of the Idrijca River in the Municipality of Cerkno in the traditional Littoral region of Slovenia.

The local church is dedicated to Saint George and belongs to the Parish of Otalež.
