= Trebenče =

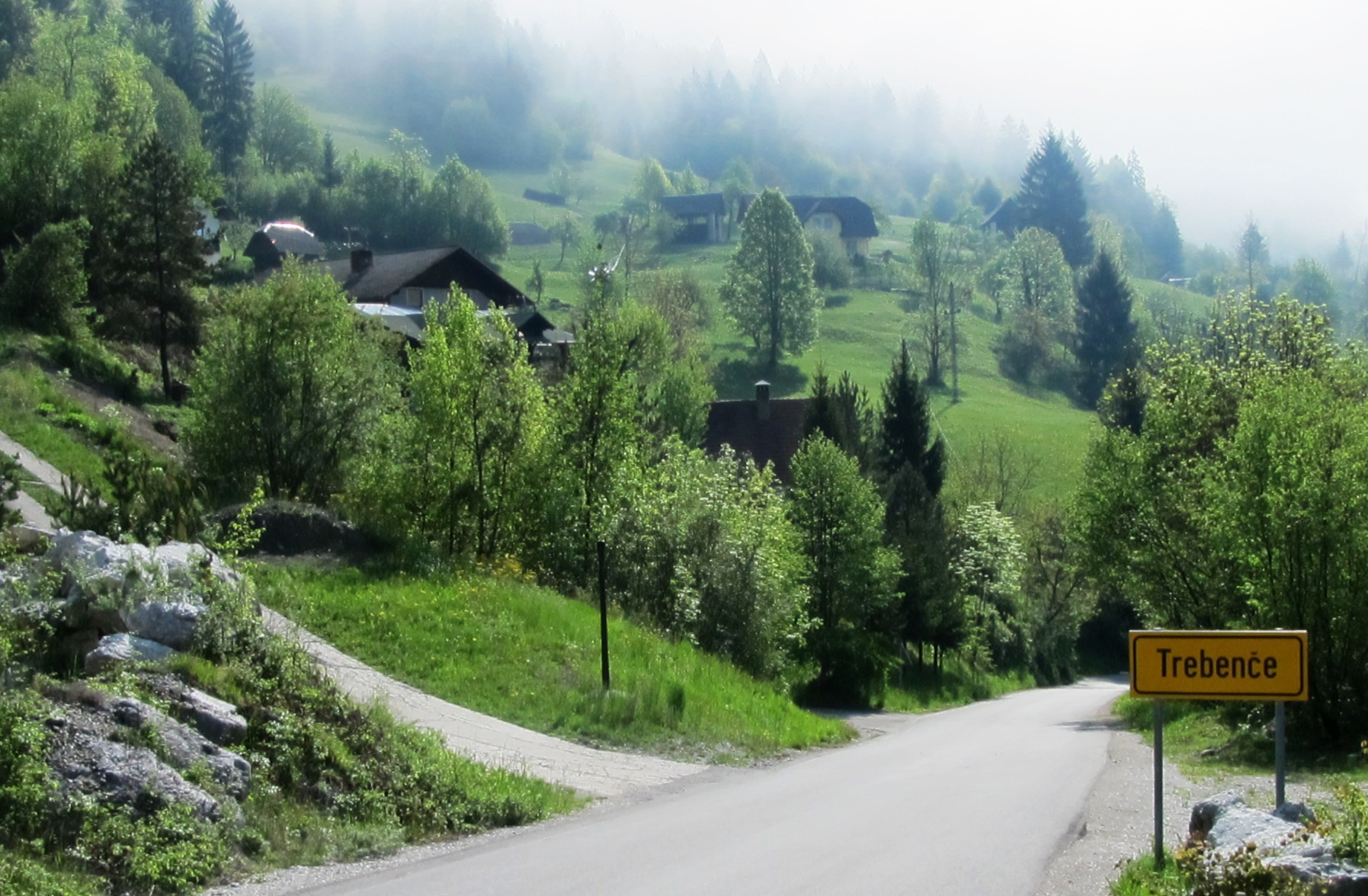

- Location in Slovenia
- Coordinates: 46°8′36.35″N 13°59′7.07″E
- Country: Slovenia
- Traditional region: Littoral
- Statistical region: Gorizia
- Municipality: Cerkno

Area
  - Total: 0.98 km^{2} (0.38 sq mi)
- Elevation: 453 m (1,486 ft)

Population (2020)
  - Total: 93
  - Density: 95/km^{2} (250/sq mi)

Trebenče (pronounced [tɾɛˈbeːntʃɛ]) is a village north of Cerkno in the traditional Littoral region of Slovenia.

== Church ==
The local church is dedicated to Saint Josse and belongs to the Parish of Cerkno. The church stands on a rocky rise northwest of Trebenče. It was originally a Gothic structure that was remodeled in the Baroque style. The presbytery and nave preserve paintings believed to date from the 16th century. There is a wooden Baroque altar against the south wall of the nave.

== Other cultural heritage ==
In addition to the church, a number of other structures in Trebenče have official cultural heritage status:

- The farm at Trebenče no. 4 stands in a cluster of other farms and houses in the village, above the main road and southeast of the Church of Saint Josse. The rectangular house has a gabled roof and decorated plaster on its facade. There is also a granary under the same roof. The farm also includes a stall and a barn, and was renovated in 1947.
- The Gradišče archaeological site is an unexplored potential site. It is the location of a prehistoric fort. There is a folk tradition of a structure at the site and a gilded clay pot was found there.
- A closed chapel-shrine stands on a rocky outcrop alongside the bridge east of the house at Trenenče no. 15. It is a stone structure with a gabled metal roof shaped to accommodate a triangular cornice on the front side. The top of the roof is ornamented by a stone orb and a metal cross. The sides are decorated with pilasters, and the door casing and windows are rounded at the top.
- There is a Partisan memorial at the crossroads in the northwest part of the village. It is a rectangular stone structure with a stone plaque on the front commemorating Partisan institutions and units that functioned in Trebenče during the Second World War. It was installed on 12 May 1985.
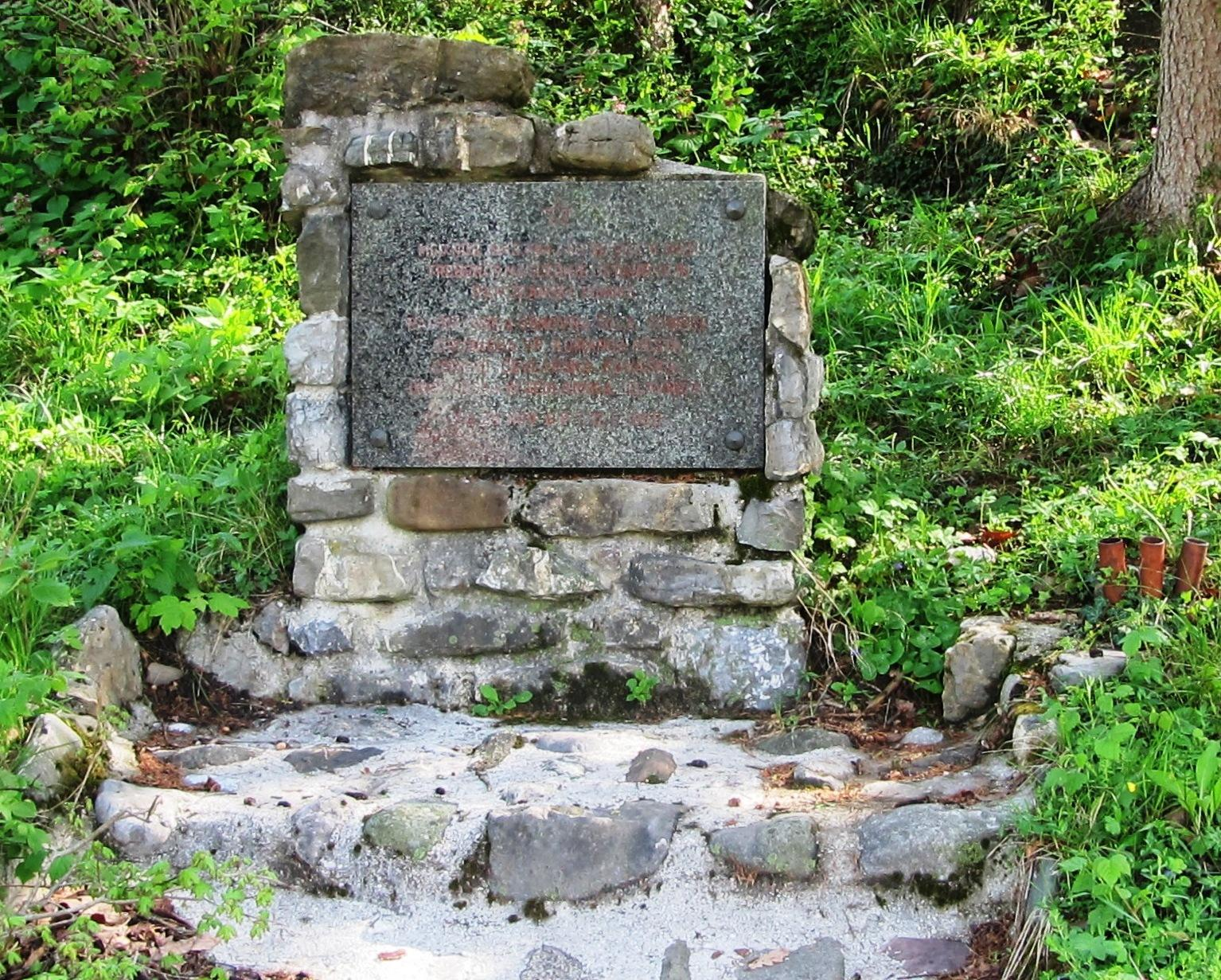
Partisan memorial in Trebenče
