= Zakriž =

- Location in Slovenia
- Coordinates: 46°8′9.6″N 13°58′9.32″E
- Country: Slovenia
- Traditional region: Littoral
- Statistical region: Gorizia
- Municipality: Cerkno

Area
  - Total: 3.66 km^{2} (1.41 sq mi)
- Elevation: 587.7 m (1,928 ft)

Population (2020)
  - Total: 188
  - Density: 51.4/km^{2} (133/sq mi)

Zakriž (pronounced [zaˈkɾiːʃ]) is a settlement northwest of Cerkno in the traditional Littoral region of Slovenia.

== Geography ==
Zakriž is a village on the slope of Davinec Hill (872 meters or 2,861 feet) to the north, and Big Kovk Hill (Slovene: Veliki Kovk; 839 meters or 2,753 feet) rises to the south. The hamlet of Vrh Križa lies above the village. Cultivated fields and meadows lie on sandy soil on the slopes of the hills. Zajegrščica Creek flows southeast through the village, eventually joining the Cerknica River in Cerkno. Mixed forest surrounds the village.

== Name ==
The name of the village is derived from the common noun križ 'cross'. In many cases, villages with similar names are named after a local church or cross-shaped wayside shrine. However, in this case it is more likely that the name Zakriž—literally, 'behind the cross(ing)'—refers to the village's location near a crossroads (cf. Slovene križišče 'crossroads'), as indicated by its position along a transport route.

== History ==
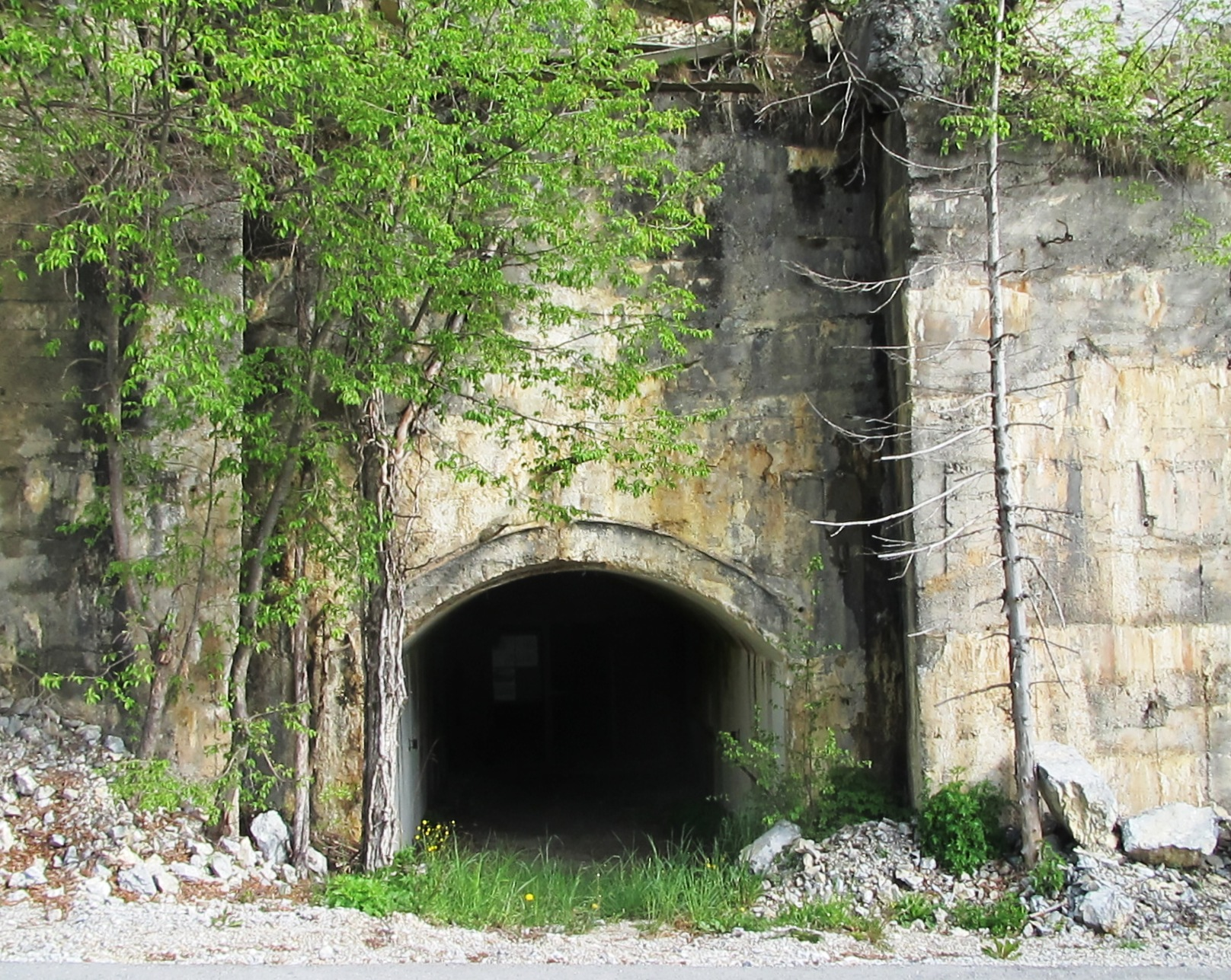
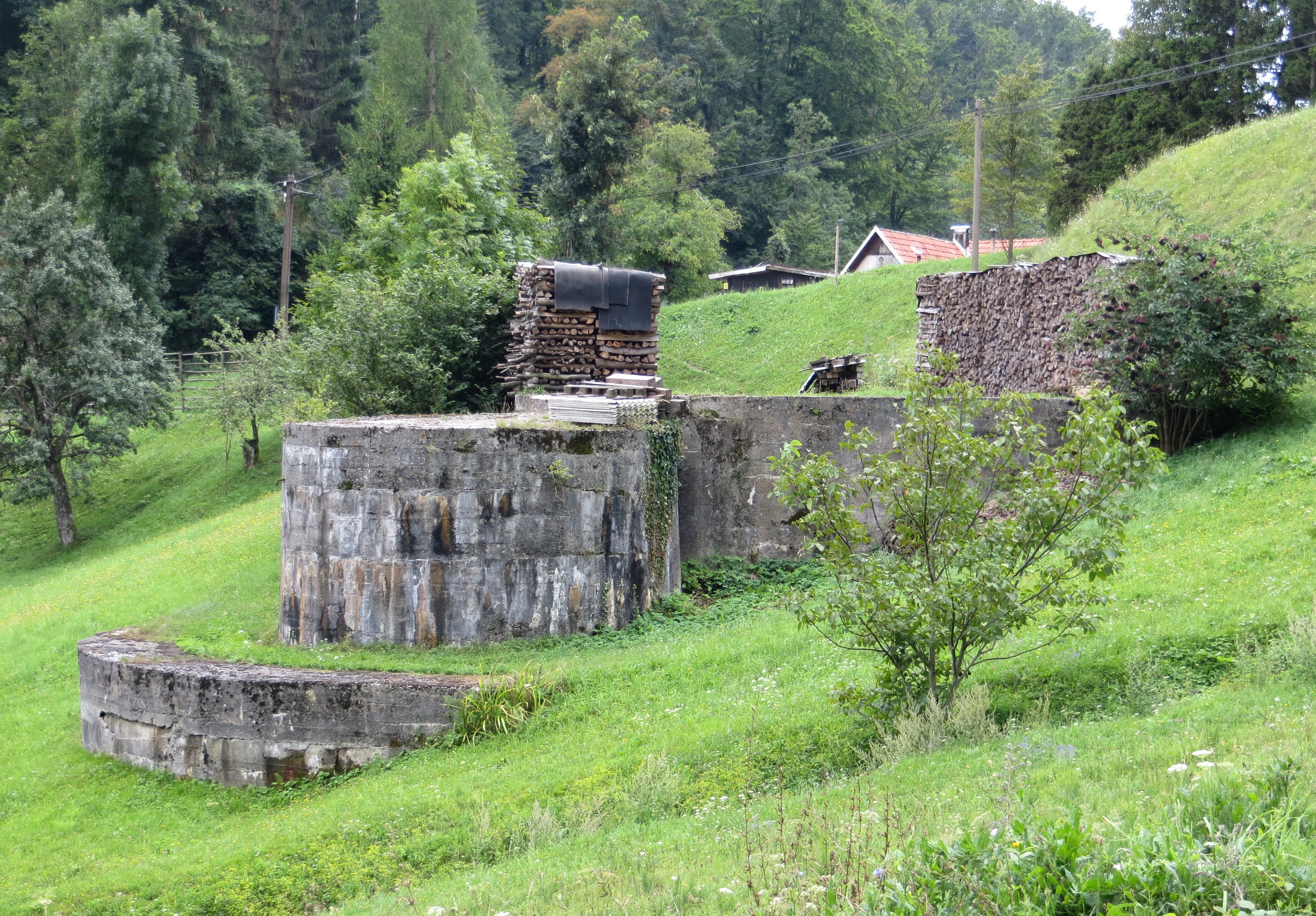
Italian fortifications above Zakriž

A water main was installed in Zakriž in 1903, piped from Big Kovk Hill. During the interwar period, the Italian authorities installed military fortifications above the village as part of the Alpine Wall, but the installation was never completed. During the Second World War, Italian Carabinieri had an outpost in the barracks above the village. They were routed on January 26, 1943 in an engagement with the Partisans, who later set up Partisan workshops in the barracks. In the second half of 1944, the Partisans stationed staffs of various brigades and artillery in the village.

=== Mass grave ===
Zakriž is the site of a mass grave associated with the Second World War. The Zakriž Mass Grave (Grobišče Zakriž), also known as the Slope Mass Grave (Grobišče v Rebrah), lies southwest of the village core, on the steep western slope of Big Kovk Hill (Veliki Kovk), below a series of cliffs below a forest path. It contains the remains of 22 or 23 civilians that were taken from the prison in Cerkno or held for forced labor, and who were murdered by the Partisans on March 21 or 22, 1945.

== Church ==
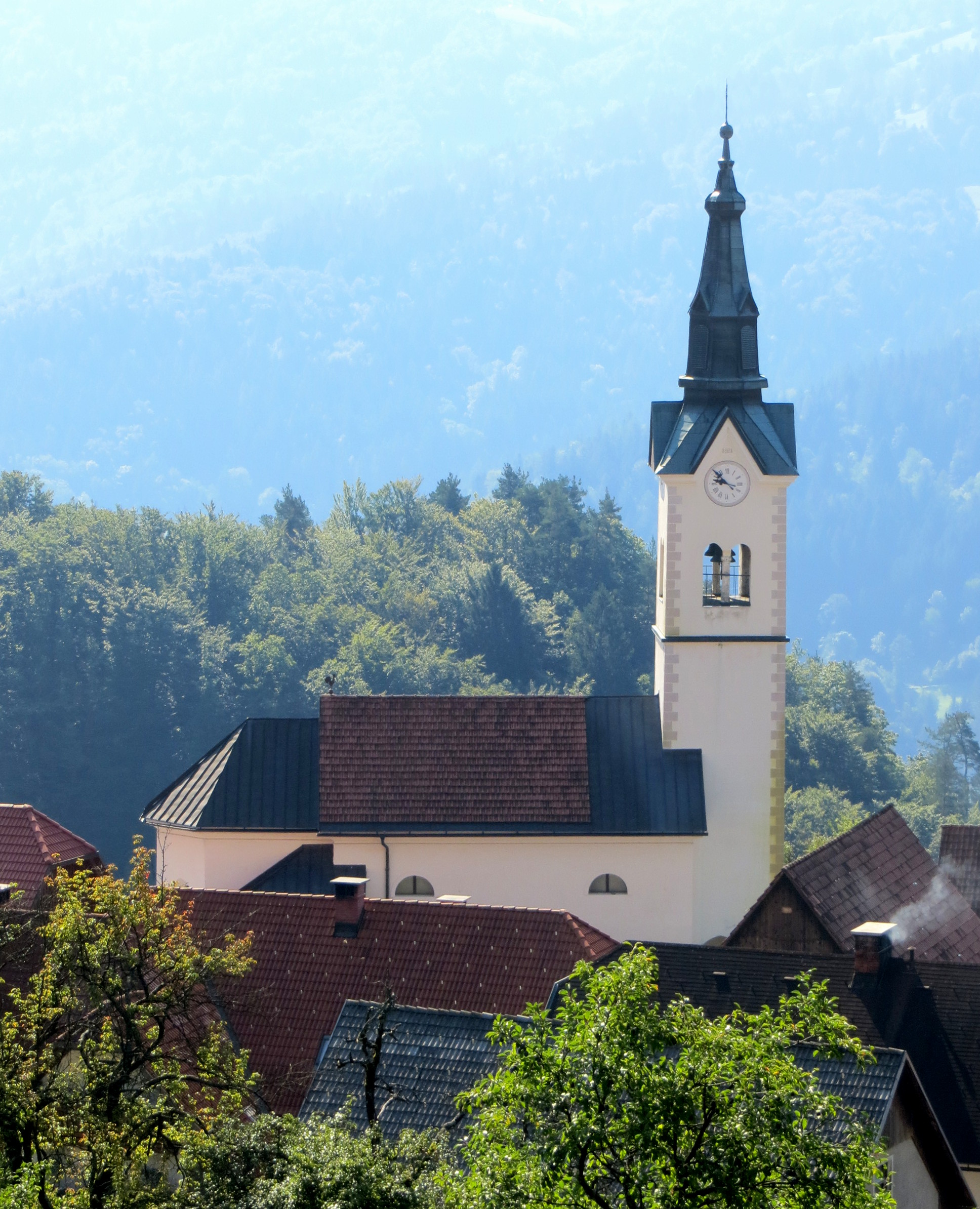
Saint Andrew's Church

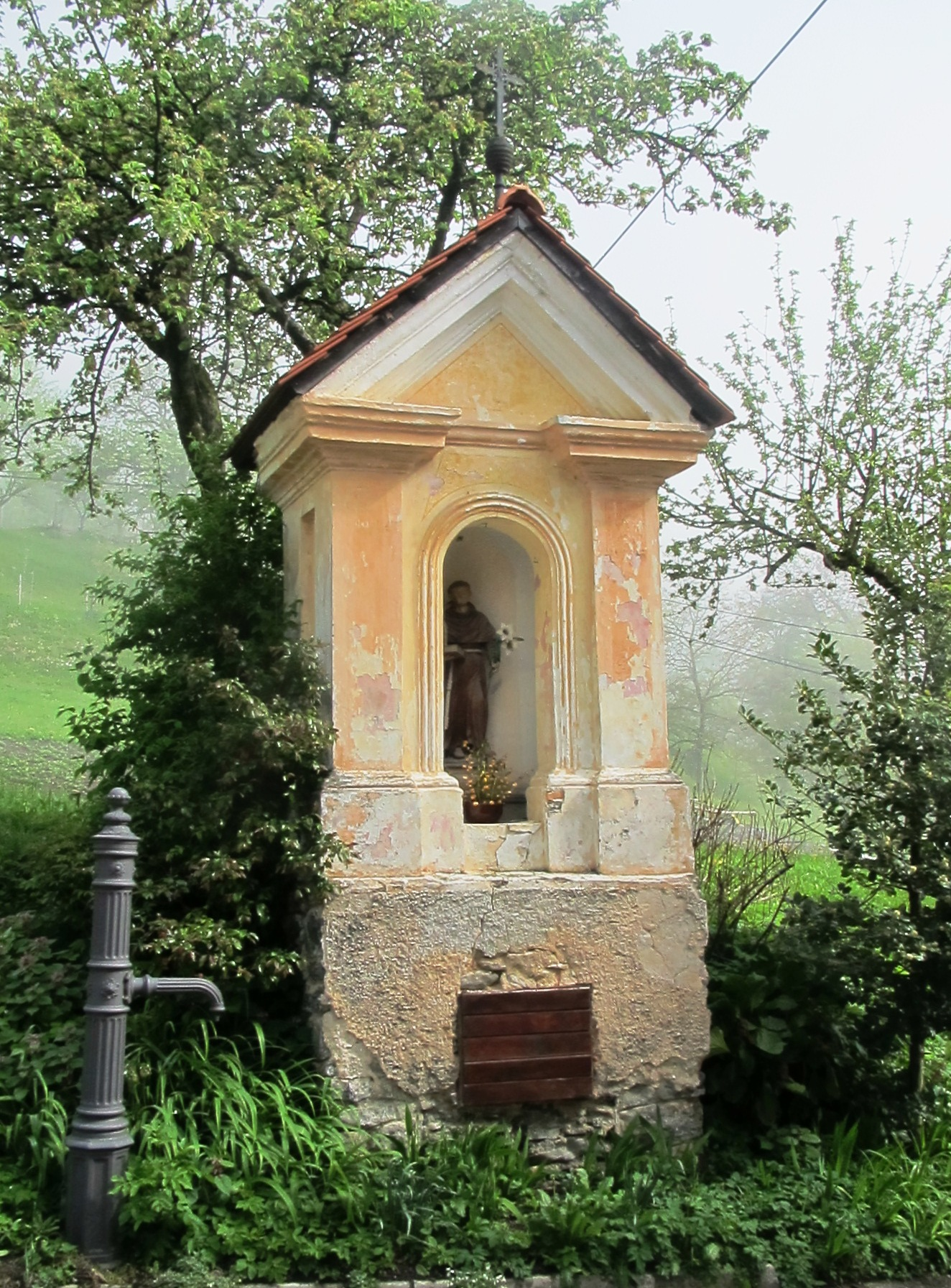
Wayside shrine

Religious heritage in Zakriž

The local church is dedicated to Saint Andrew and belongs to the Parish of Cerkno. It is a Gothic structure that was reworked in the 18th century. It has a polygonal chancel walled on three sides, a rectangular nave, and a bell tower. The furnishings were created by local wood carvers in the 19th century.

Near the house at Zakriž no. 11 is a small chapel-shrine, which stood above a watering trough (now destroyed, although the pump remains). It is built of stone and has an arched niche with a wooden statue of Saint Anthony of Padua, a triangular gable, and a double-pitched roof.
