= Straža, Cerkno =

Straža
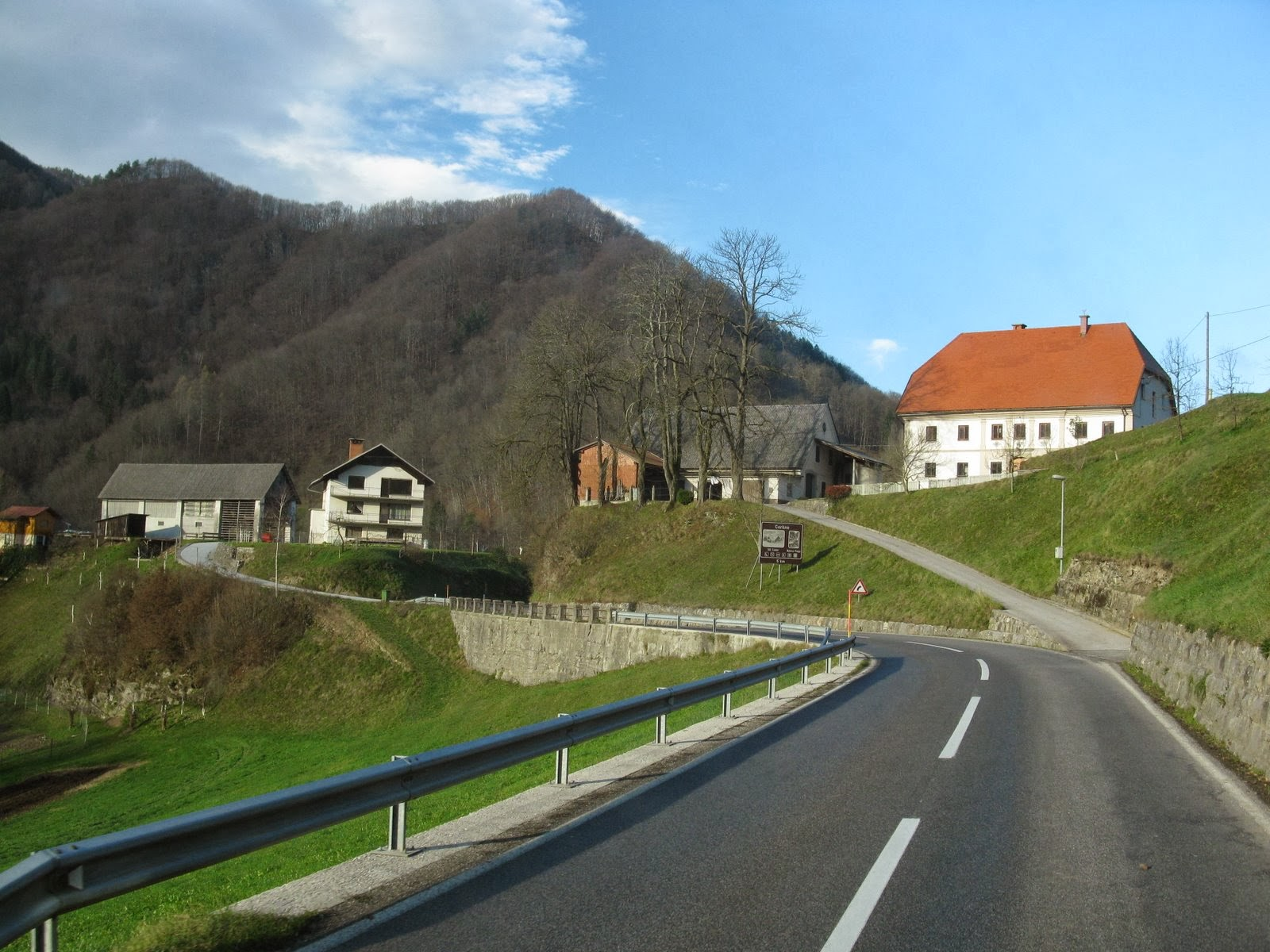

- Location in Slovenia
- Coordinates: 46°5′49.9″N 13°57′19.12″E
- Country: Slovenia
- Traditional region: Littoral
- Statistical region: Gorizia
- Municipality: Cerkno

Area
  - Total: 6.06 km^{2} (2.34 sq mi)
- Elevation: 252.4 m (828 ft)

Population (2020)
  - Total: 114
  - Density: 18.8/km^{2} (48.7/sq mi)

Straža (pronounced [ˈstɾaːʒa]) is a settlement on the Idrijca River southwest of Cerkno in the traditional Littoral region of Slovenia.

The local church is dedicated to the Conversion of Paul and belongs to the Parish of Cerkno.
