= Plužnje =

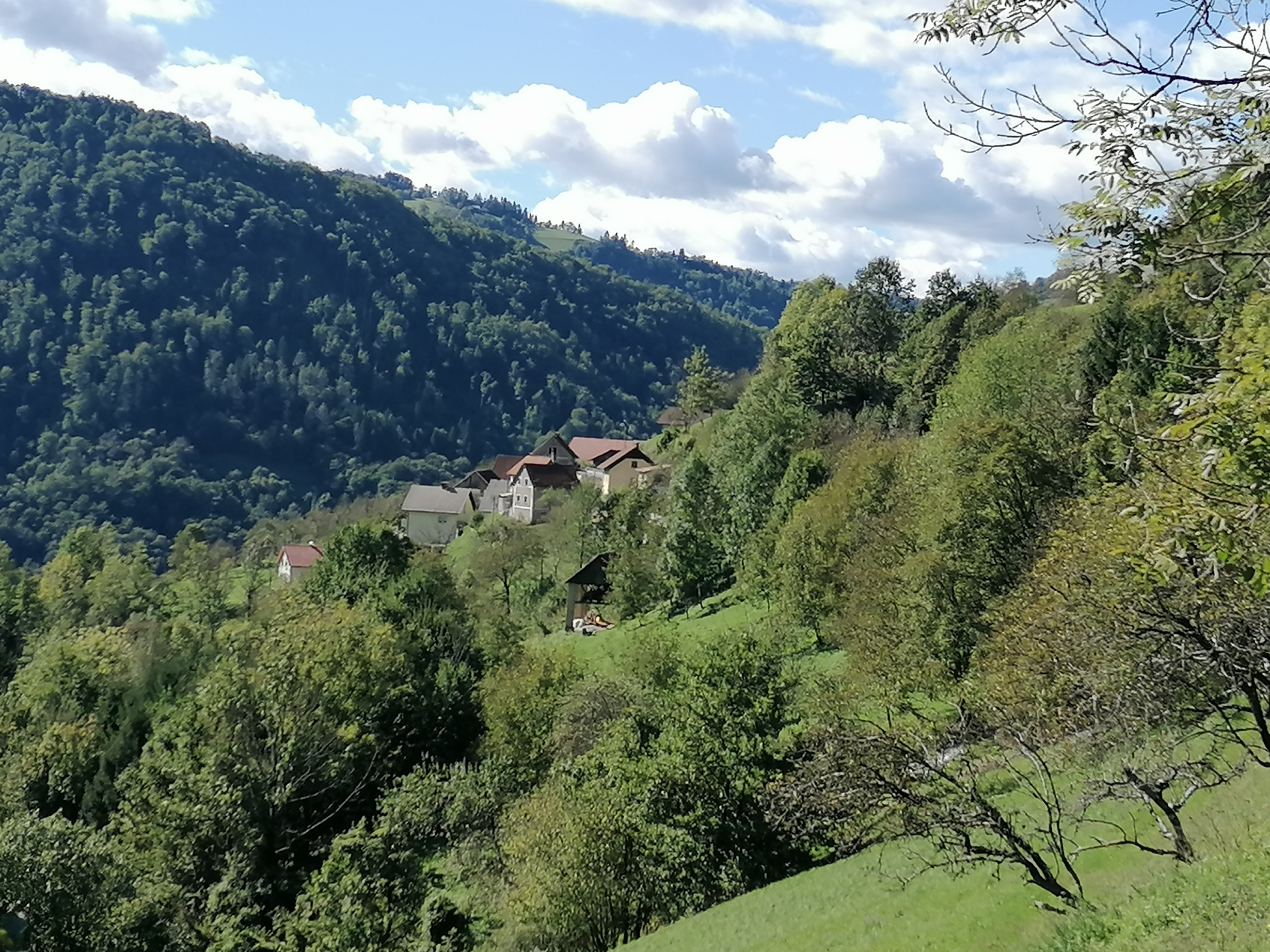

- Location in Slovenia
- Coordinates: 46°5′8.8″N 13°58′39.63″E
- Country: Slovenia
- Traditional region: Littoral
- Statistical region: Gorizia
- Municipality: Cerkno

Area
  - Total: 2.07 km^{2} (0.80 sq mi)
- Elevation: 476.6 m (1,564 ft)

Population (2020)
  - Total: 104
  - Density: 50.2/km^{2} (130/sq mi)

Plužnje (pronounced [ˈpluːʒnjɛ]) is a settlement in the hills above the right bank of the Idrijca River in the Municipality of Cerkno in the traditional Littoral region of Slovenia.
