= Franja Partisan Hospital =

Former hospital in Slovenia

Coordinates: 46°9′12.7″N 14°1′42.87″E

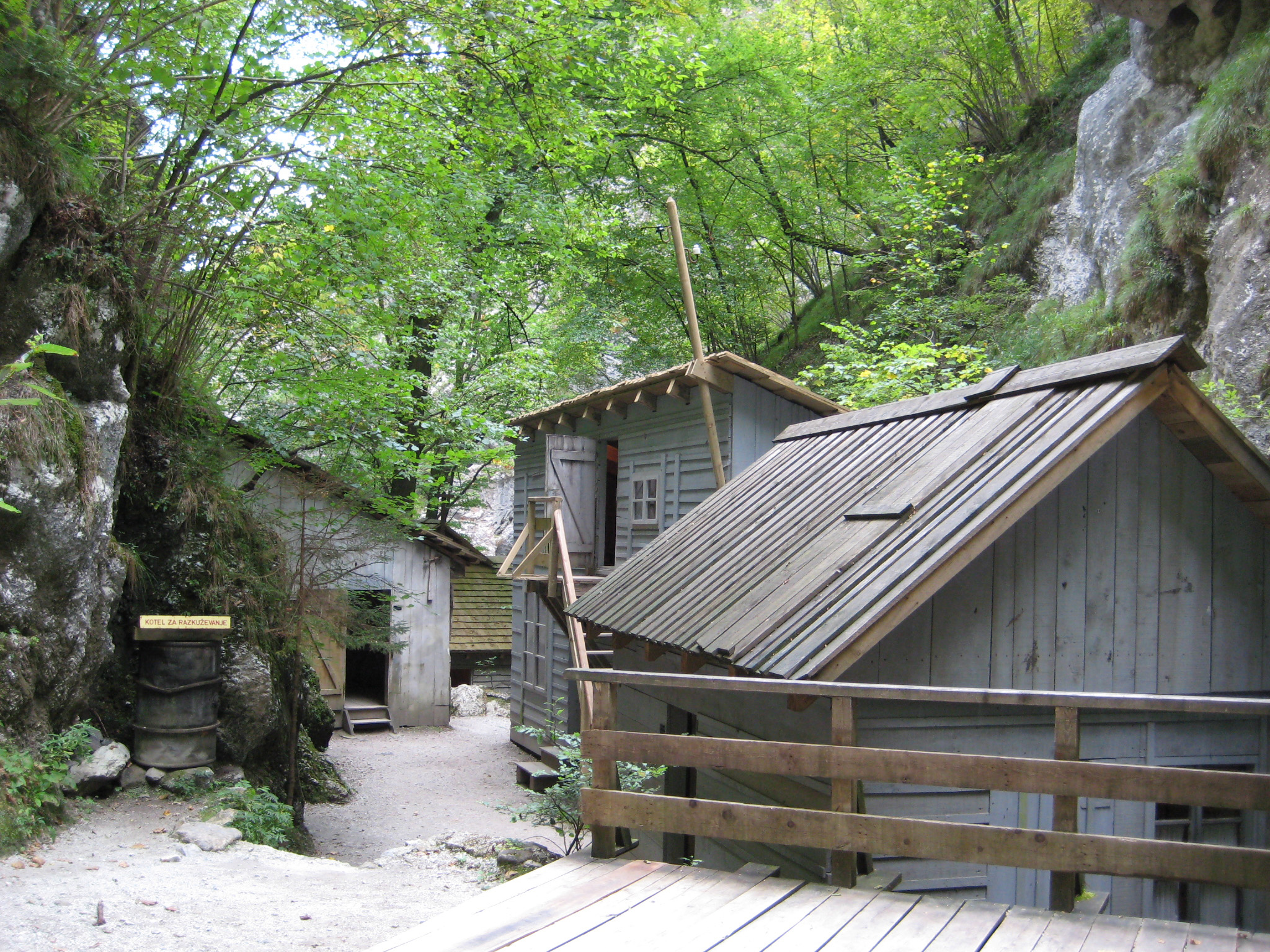
Franja Partisan Hospital on 15 September 2007, three days prior to the hospital's near destruction in a flood

Franja Partisan Hospital (Slovene: Partizanska bolnica Franja) was a secret World War II hospital at Dolenji Novaki near Cerkno in western Slovenia. It was run by the Slovene Partisans from December 1943 until the end of the war as part of a broadly organized resistance movement against the Fascist Italian and Nazi German forces.

The wounded treated there were soldiers from both the Allied Powers and the Axis powers. Although the Wehrmacht forces, which occupied territory that had been annexed by Italy, launched several attempts to find the hospital, it was never discovered. Today the reconstructed site exists as a museum. It has been protected as a cultural monument of national significance.

== History and overview ==
=== World War II ===
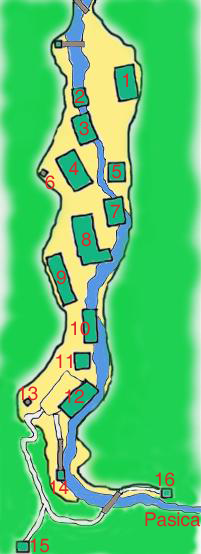
Numerical plan of hospital buildings before the near destruction: 1. Hut for the wounded; bunker; 2. Isolation unit; 3. Operating hut; 4. Doctors' barracks; 5. X-ray unit; 6. Stretcher store; 7. Kitchen; 8. Hut for the wounded; dining room; 9. Hut for the wounded, stores and carpenters' workshop; 10. Staff rooms; 11. Bathroom; laundry room; 12. Infirmary; 13. Water tank; 14. Electric plant; 15. Building for burying limbs; 16. Bunker over the Pasica Gorge

Built in difficult and rugged terrain in the remote Pasica Gorge in western Slovenia by Slovene Partisans, the hospital opened in December 1943 and saw continuous improvements until May 1945. The hospital was located deep inside German-occupied Europe, only a few hours from Austria and the central parts of the Third Reich. German military activity was frequent in the general region throughout the operation of the hospital. The hospital's entrance was hidden in the forest, and the hospital could only be reached by bridges.

The bridges could be retracted if the enemy was in the vicinity. In order to preserve the secrecy necessary for a clandestine hospital to operate, the patients were blindfolded during transportation to the facility. The hospital was also protected by minefields and nests of machine guns. Because the hospital is in a gorge, the many trees and camouflaged buildings provided protection against air reconnaissance.

The founder and first builder of the hospital was Viktor Volčjak, but the hospital was named after its manager and physician, Franja Bojc Bidovec, who began working there in February 1944. Among the doctors working in the hospital there was also an Italian, Antonio Ciccarelli. Extremely well equipped for a clandestine partisan operation, the hospital remained intact until the end of the war. It was designed to provide treatment to as many as 120 patients at a time, but saw almost ten times as many during its operation. Most of its patients were wounded anti-Nazi resistance fighters, who could not go to regular hospitals because they would be arrested. Among its patients were many nationalities, including one wounded German enemy soldier who, after being treated, remained in the hospital as a member of the hospital staff. The hospital operated until 5 May 1945.

=== Postwar period ===
A reconstruction of Franja Partisan Hospital became part of the Cerkno Museum in 1963. In 1997, an American Association of Air Force Veterans issued an award to Franja Hospital for saving and treating the downed American pilot Harold Adams.

It has been on a list of candidates to become a UNESCO World Heritage Site since 2000. In 2003, a stamp was issued by the Slovene Post Office to mark the 60th anniversary of Franja Hospital, and became the stamp of the year in Slovenia.

On 18 September 2007, the site was badly damaged in a flood after torrential rains. It was reconstructed and completely rebuilt by 2010, and it was then reopened for visitors. On 13 July 2023, heavy rainfall damaged the site again, completely destroying three buildings. In the event, three more buildings were damaged, electrical wiring was destroyed, and access to the entrance building was cut off.
