= Jazne =

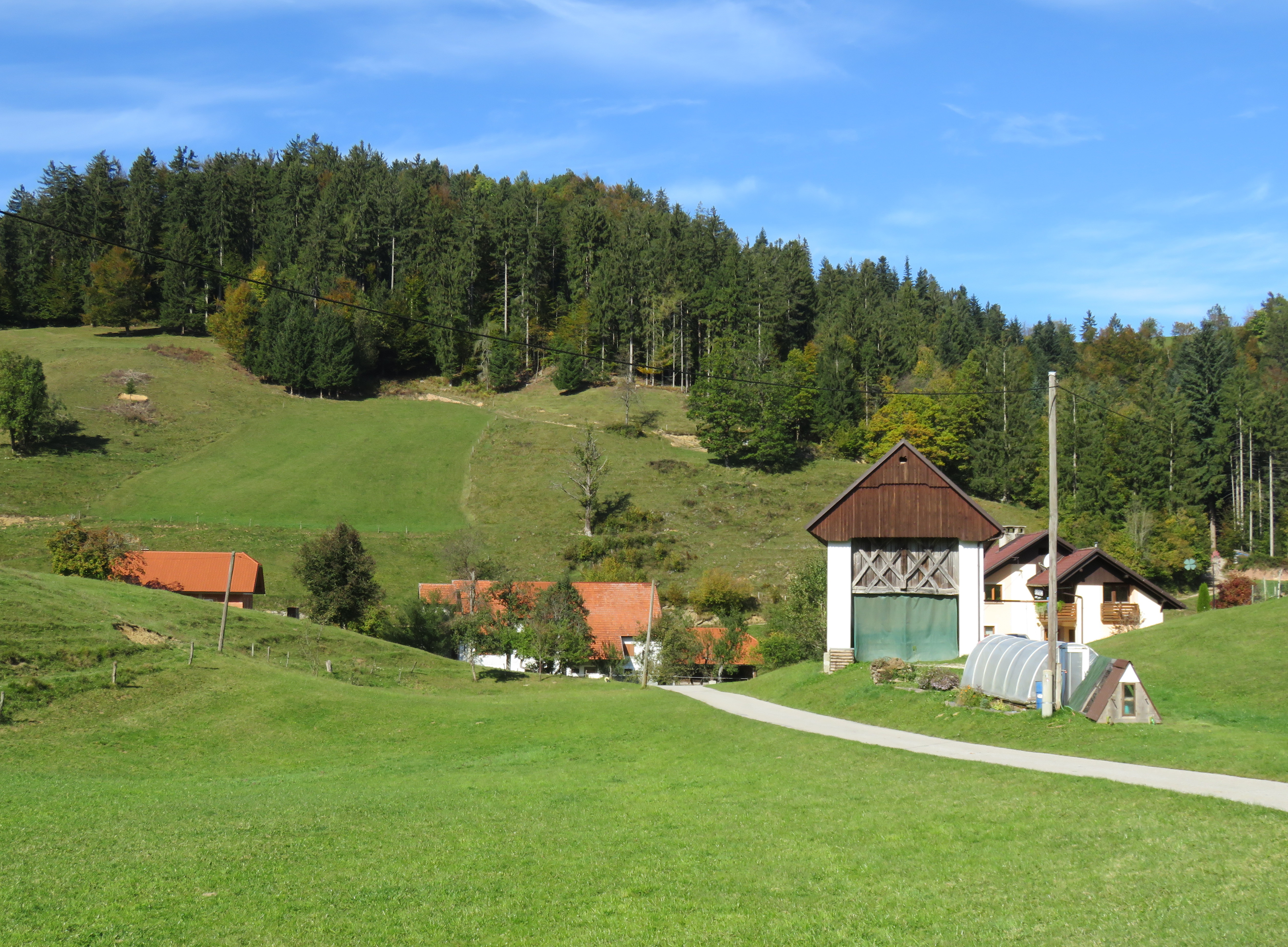

- Location in Slovenia
- Coordinates: 46°4′13.27″N 14°0′51.01″E
- Country: Slovenia
- Traditional region: Littoral
- Statistical region: Gorizia
- Municipality: Cerkno

Area
  - Total: 5.09 km^{2} (1.97 sq mi)
- Elevation: 681.4 m (2,236 ft)

Population (2020)
  - Total: 119
  - Density: 23.4/km^{2} (60.6/sq mi)

Jazne (pronounced [ˈjaːznɛ]) is a settlement in the hills above the Idrijca Valley in the Municipality of Cerkno in the traditional Littoral region of Slovenia.

== Church ==
The local church is dedicated to Saint Nicholas and belongs to the Parish of Otalež.

== Cultural heritage ==
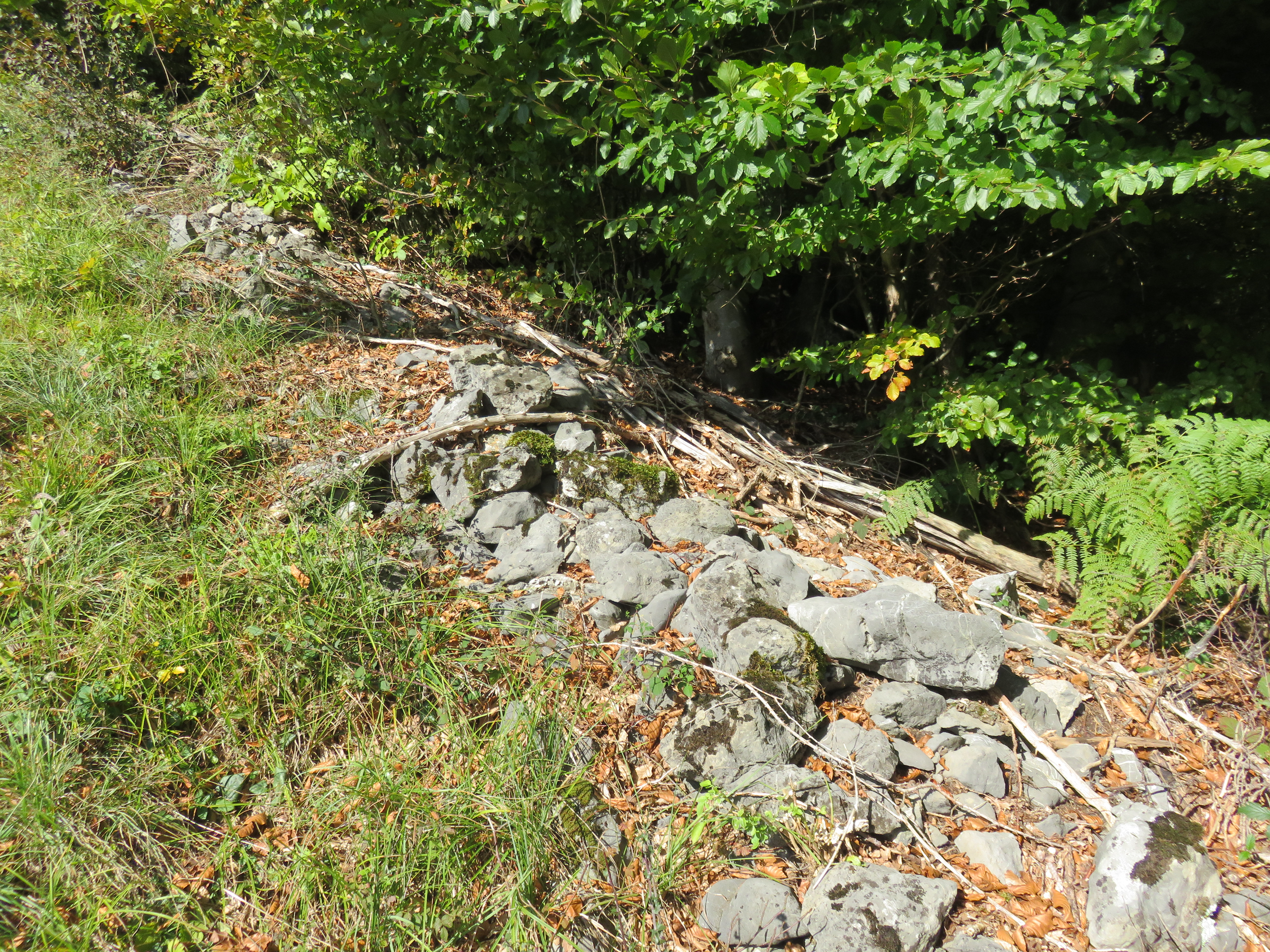
Remnant of the Claustra Alpium Iuliarum in Jazne

The remnants of a Roman defensive wall, the Claustra Alpium Iuliarum, lie in the southeastern part of Jazne. The wall is located south of the Lanišar farm, and it runs east of the hamlet of Znojile toward Gorenje Jazne.
