= Jurij Moškon =

Slovenian film editor and photographer (born 1973)

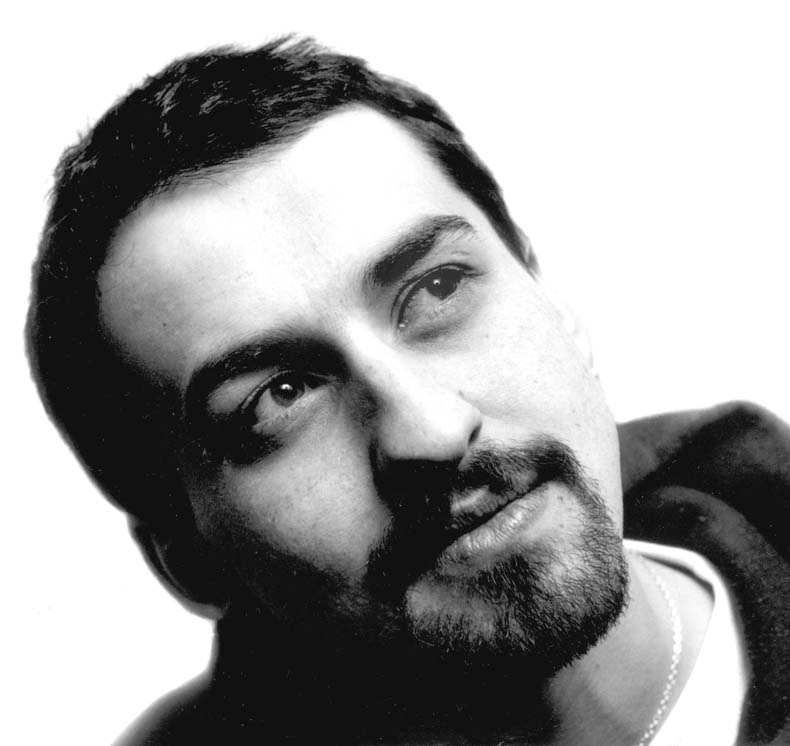
Self-portrait of Jurij Moškon

Jurij Moškon (born 6 March 1973) is a Slovenian film editor and photographer. He received the Vesna award, the main Slovenian recognition in the field of film.

Jurij Moškon was born in Novo Mesto to mother Branka, a folklorist, and father Marjan, the founder of the Novo Mesto Television, the first local-regional television station in Slovenia. He became active in video and film creation in 1991, when he was involved in the establishment of the Novo Mesto Television. In 1997 and 1998, he studied in Prague, Czech Republic, at the 3F programme of the FAMU academy. In 1999, he published a book on film editing, titled Video Technology and Creativity (Videotehnika in ustvarjalnost). In 2001, he received a special recognition from the Municipality of Novo Mesto for his ten-year work. In 2002, he co-edited the film Headnoise (Zvenenje v glavi) by Andrej Košak, which among other prizes received the Best Cinematography Award at the Cologne Mediterranean Film Festival. In 2004, he edited the film Work Liberates (Delo osvobaja) by Damjan Kozole. In 2008, at the 11th Slovenian Film Festival, he received the Vesna award for the editing of the film Forever (Slovene: Za vedno), directed by Kozole. He also co-edited the films Slovene Girl (Slovenka, 2009) by Kozole and Going Our Way (Gremo mi po svoje, 2010) by Miha Hočevar. In 2011, he edited the documentary The Slope to the Home (Klanec do doma), directed by Dušan Moravec, about the painter Rafael Terpin and the Cerkno Hills. He lives in Novo Mesto.
