= Čeplez =

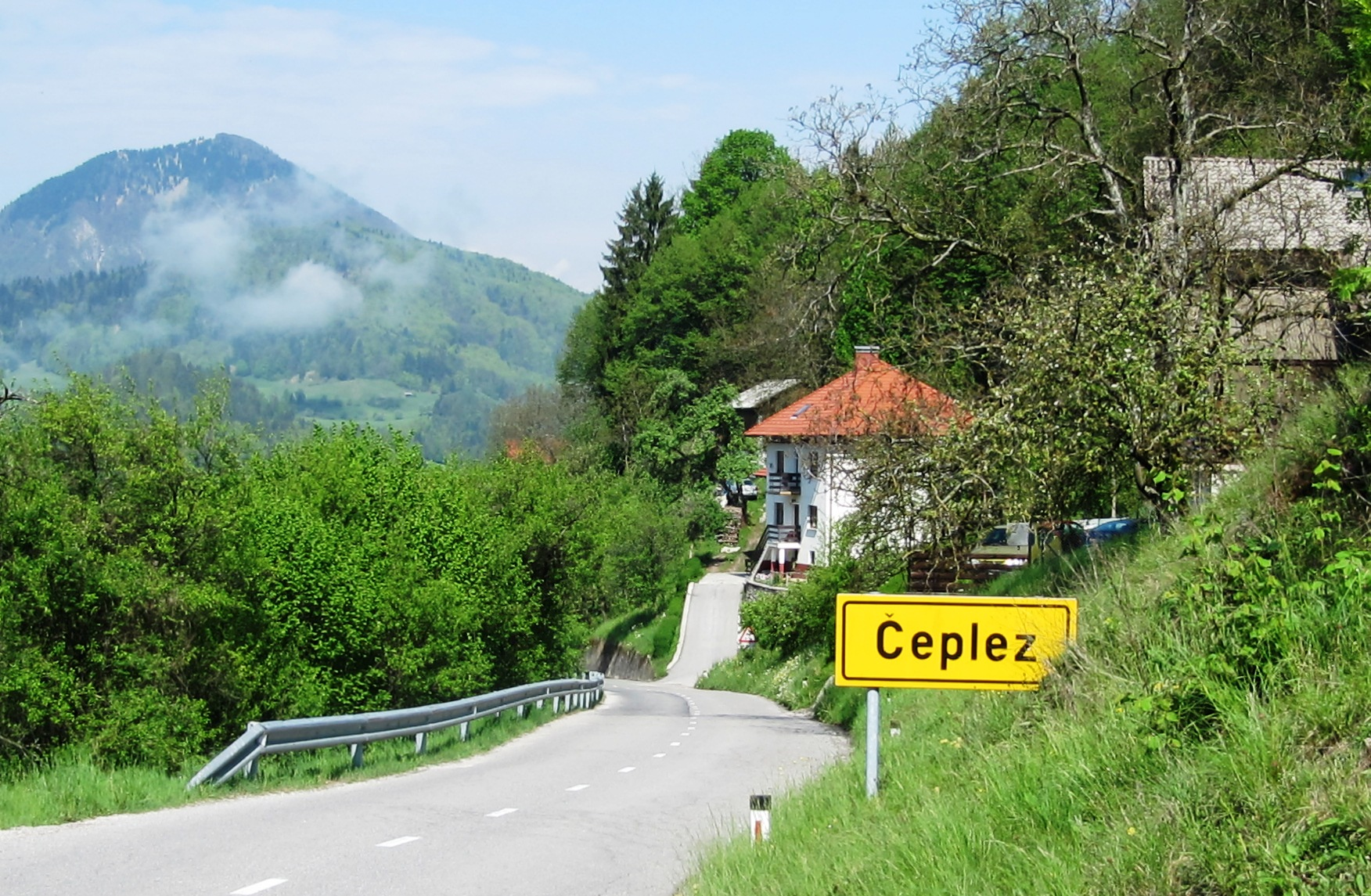

- Location in Slovenia
- Coordinates: 46°7′39.57″N 14°0′10.54″E
- Country: Slovenia
- Traditional region: Littoral
- Statistical region: Gorizia
- Municipality: Cerkno

Area
  - Total: 1.74 km^{2} (0.67 sq mi)
- Elevation: 564.4 m (1,852 ft)

Population (2020)
  - Total: 73
  - Density: 42/km^{2} (110/sq mi)

Čeplez (pronounced [ˈtʃeːplɛs]) is a small settlement in the hills east of Cerkno in the traditional Littoral region of Slovenia.
