= Šebrelje =

- Location in Slovenia
- Coordinates: 46°5′28.16″N 13°55′0.52″E
- Country: Slovenia
- Traditional region: Littoral
- Statistical region: Gorizia
- Municipality: Cerkno

Area
  - Total: 11.89 km^{2} (4.59 sq mi)
- Elevation: 638.8 m (2,096 ft)

Population (2020)
  - Total: 294
  - Density: 24.7/km^{2} (64.0/sq mi)

Šebrelje (pronounced [ʃɛˈbɾeːljɛ]) is a village in the Municipality of Cerkno in the traditional Littoral region of Slovenia.

The parish church in the settlement is dedicated to Saint George and belongs to the Koper Diocese. A second church, belonging to the same parish, is built outside the settlement to the north and is dedicated to John the Baptist.
