= Gorje, Cerkno =

Gorje
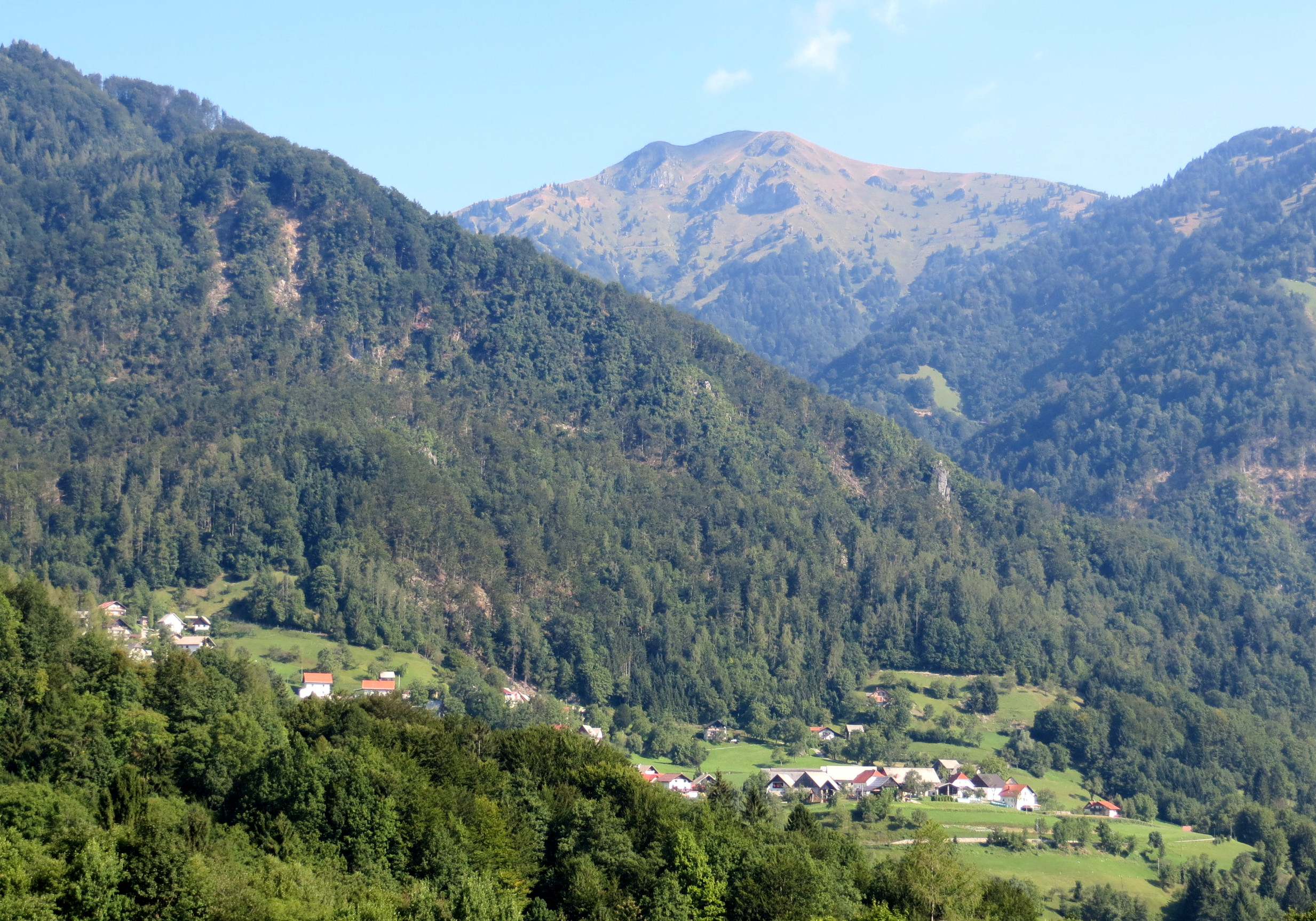

- Location in Slovenia
- Coordinates: 46°9′1.94″N 13°58′30.72″E
- Country: Slovenia
- Traditional region: Littoral
- Statistical region: Gorizia
- Municipality: Cerkno

Area
  - Total: 4.14 km^{2} (1.60 sq mi)
- Elevation: 576.7 m (1,892 ft)

Population (2020)
  - Total: 80
  - Density: 19/km^{2} (50/sq mi)

Gorje (pronounced [ˈɡɔːɾjɛ]) is a settlement in the hills north of Cerkno in the traditional Littoral region of Slovenia.
