= Ravne pri Cerknem =

- Village
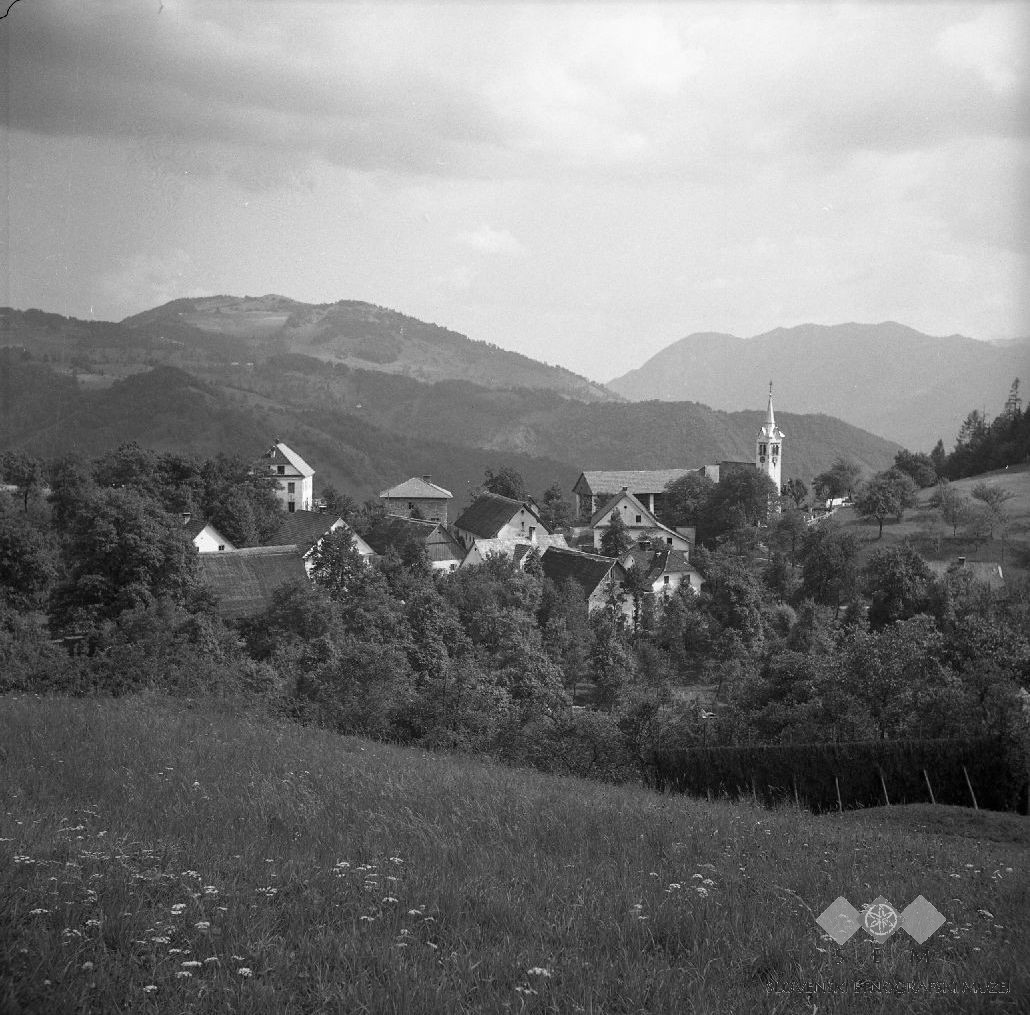
- Ravne pri Cerknem in 1954

- Location in Slovenia
- Coordinates: 46°7′18.9″N 13°57′15.76″E
- Country: Slovenia
- Traditional region: Littoral
- Statistical region: Gorizia
- Municipality: Cerkno

Area
  - Total: 5.03 km^{2} (1.94 sq mi)
- Elevation: 684.2 m (2,245 ft)

Population (2020)
  - Total: 175
  - Density: 34.8/km^{2} (90.1/sq mi)

Ravne pri Cerknem (pronounced [ˈɾáːwnɛ pɾi ˈtsèːɾknɛm, ˈɾàː-]) is a settlement west of Cerkno in the traditional Littoral region of Slovenia.

The parish church in the settlement is dedicated to Saint Ulrich and belongs to the Koper Diocese.
