= Jagršče =

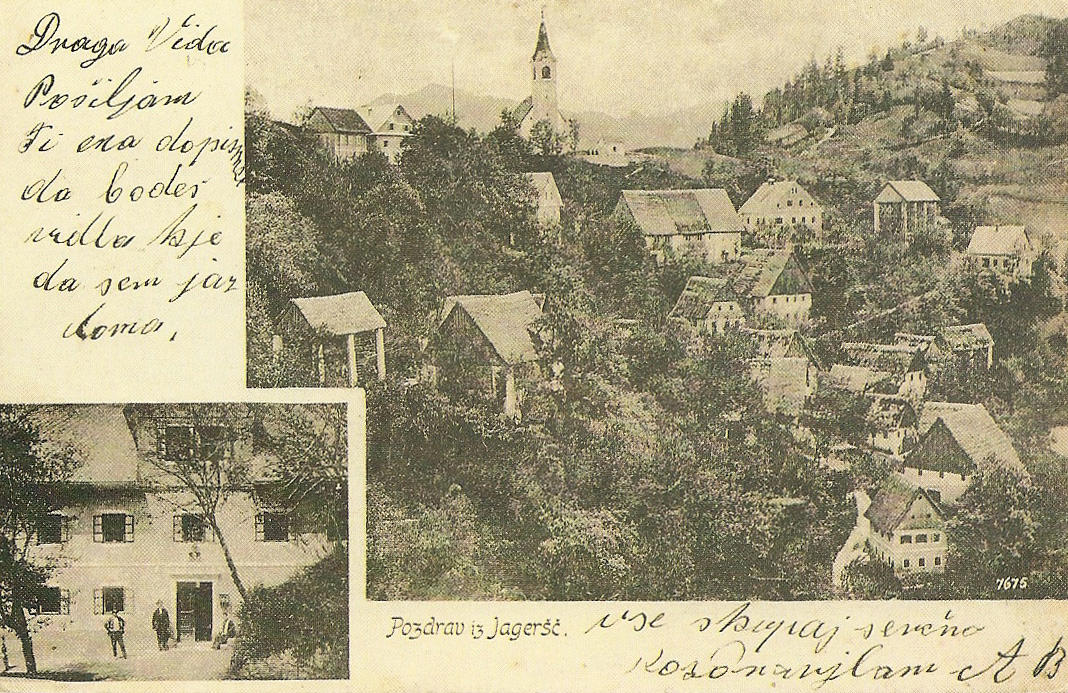
- 1910 postcard of Jagršče

- Location in Slovenia
- Coordinates: 46°5′17.03″N 13°56′31.51″E
- Country: Slovenia
- Traditional region: Littoral
- Statistical region: Gorizia
- Municipality: Cerkno

Area
  - Total: 4.59 km^{2} (1.77 sq mi)
- Elevation: 657.8 m (2,158 ft)

Population (2020)
  - Total: 31
  - Density: 6.8/km^{2} (17/sq mi)

Jagršče (pronounced [ˈjaːɡəɾʃtʃɛ]) is a settlement in the hills above the Idrijca Valley in the Municipality of Cerkno in the traditional Littoral region of Slovenia.

The parish church in the village is dedicated to Saint Ursula and belongs to the Koper Diocese.
