= Reka, Cerkno =

Reka
- Location in Slovenia
- Coordinates: 46°6′53.62″N 13°55′29.12″E
- Country: Slovenia
- Traditional region: Littoral
- Statistical region: Gorizia
- Municipality: Cerkno

Area
  - Total: 3.71 km^{2} (1.43 sq mi)
- Elevation: 252.8 m (829 ft)

Population (2020)
  - Total: 78
  - Density: 21/km^{2} (54/sq mi)

Reka (pronounced [ˈɾeːka]) is a settlement on the Idrijca River in the Municipality of Cerkno in the traditional Littoral region of Slovenia.

The local church is dedicated to Saint Cantius and belongs to the Parish of Cerkno.
