= Headnoise (film) =

- Directed by: Andrej Košak
- Written by: Andrej Košak; Dejan Dukovski
- Starring: Jernej Šugman; Ksenija Mišić; Albert Vlado Novak; Uroš Potočnik; Radko Polič; Ivan Godnič; Haris Burina; Petar Arsovski; Bogdan Diklić
- Edited by: Jurij Moškon
- Music by: Saša Lošić
- Release date: 2002
- Running time: 90 minutes
- Country: Slovenia
- Language: Slovene

Headnoise (Slovene: Zvenenje v glavi) is a Slovenian feature film by the director Andrej Košak, featuring Jernej Šugman in the main role. It was released in 2002. It was edited by Jurij Moškon, who received the Best Cinematography Award at the Cologne Mediterranean Film Festival for it.

== Plot ==
In 1970 Yugoslavia, inmates at the Livada prison led by an inmate named Keber convince reluctant prison guards to let them watch a televised game of the 1970 FIBA World Championship between Yugoslavia and the United States. However, taunting guards interrupt the viewing and provoke the prisoners to the point of rioting. After a period of a kind of blissful anarchy where the inmates taste freedom, Keber enlists the house "intellectual" Mrak to devise a system of prisoner self-government aimed at forcing reforms upon the state.

== Reception ==
The film was selected as a Slovenian submission to the 75th Academy Awards for Best Foreign Language Film, but did not get nominated.

== See also ==
- List of submissions to the 75th Academy Awards for Best Foreign Language Film
- List of Slovenian submissions for the Academy Award for Best International Feature Film
