= Police, Cerkno =

Police
- Location in Slovenia
- Coordinates: 46°7′36.55″N 13°54′4.9″E
- Country: Slovenia
- Traditional region: Littoral
- Statistical region: Gorizia
- Municipality: Cerkno

Area
  - Total: 3.45 km^{2} (1.33 sq mi)
- Elevation: 549.7 m (1,803 ft)

Population (2020)
  - Total: 21
  - Density: 6.1/km^{2} (16/sq mi)

Police (pronounced [pɔˈliːtsɛ]) is a small village in the Municipality of Cerkno in the traditional Littoral region of Slovenia.

The local church is dedicated to the Nativity of Mary and belongs to the Parish of Šentviška Gora.
