= Jernej Šugman =

Slovenian actor (1968-2017)

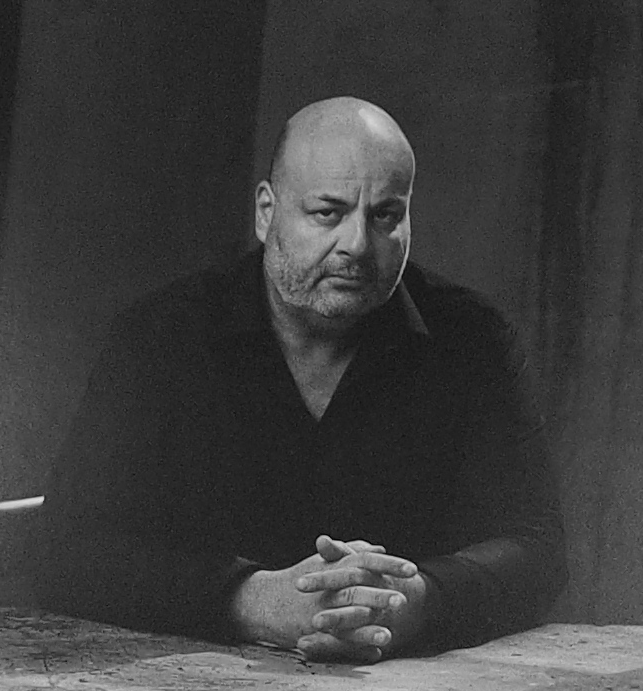
- Born: 23 December 1968; Ljubljana, Yugoslavia (now Slovenia)
- Died: 10 December 2017 (aged 48); Zelenica, Slovenia
- Education: University of Ljubljana
- Occupation: Actor

Jernej Šugman (23 December 1968 – 10 December 2017) was a prominent Slovenian theater, television and film actor.

== Biography ==
Šugman was born in Ljubljana, the son of actors Zlatko and Maja Šugman. Between 1988 and 1992, he studied acting at the Academy of Theatre, Radio, Film and Television in Ljubljana.

He graduated with the role of Astrov in Anton Chekhov's Uncle Vanya, for which he received the Sever's award and Prešeren's student award. In 1992, he joined the Ljubljana Slovene National Theatre Drama where he would remain for the rest of his career.

In theater, Šugman played 80 roles, the vast majority of those were in drama. Some of his most prominent roles include the titular roles in Shakespeare's King Lear, Othello, Titus Andronicus, Julius Caesar, and Hamlet (Šugman first played the role of Hamlet and later, after 20 years, the role of King Claudius).

Šugman played in two important dramas of Ivan Cankar, the role of Kantor in The King of Betajnova (Kralj na Betajnovi) and the role of the Priest in The Serfs (Hlapci). Other prominent roles include Molière's Orgon in Tartuffe and Alceste in The Misanthrope, Sophocles' Oedipus, Bertolt Brecht's Baal, and Agamemnon in the stage interpretation of Iliad. His last stage role was in the adaptation of Alfred Jarry's play Ubu Roi.

In addition to his stage work, Šugman frequently appeared in television shows and films. One of his most prominent characters was Veso, a receptionist at a theater in the comedy show Teater Paradižnik, directed by Branko Đurić, which aired on RTV Slovenija from 1994-97. Šugman later reprised this role in another of Đurić's comedy series Naša mala klinika (Our Little Clinic) which aired on POP TV from 2004 to 2007. Some of his other television appearances include roles in Vrtičkarji (2000–03) and Več po oglasih (2016).

Some of Šugman's most prominent film appearances include roles in Andrej Košak's Headnoise (Zvenenje v glavi, 2002) and Janez Lapajne's Short Circuits (Kratki stiki, 2006), both of which were submitted for the Academy Award for Best Foreign Language Film, and Metod Pevec's Lahko noč, gospodična (2011). Šugman was also active as a voice actor, one of his roles was providing the Slovenian voice-over for Daddy Pig in the animated television series Peppa Pig.

For his stage work, Šugman received three Borštnik's awards and the Prešeren Fund Award in 1997. For his role in Ubu Roi, he received the golden laurel wreath at the MESS theater festival in Sarajevo. He received several Sever's awards and awards by the magazine Stop for the actor of the year.

He had two children.

== Death ==
Šugman died of a heart attack, at the age of 48, in Zelenica, Slovenia during a ski trip. He was buried on 15 December at Žale Cemetery in Ljubljana, with military honors.
