= Podlanišče =

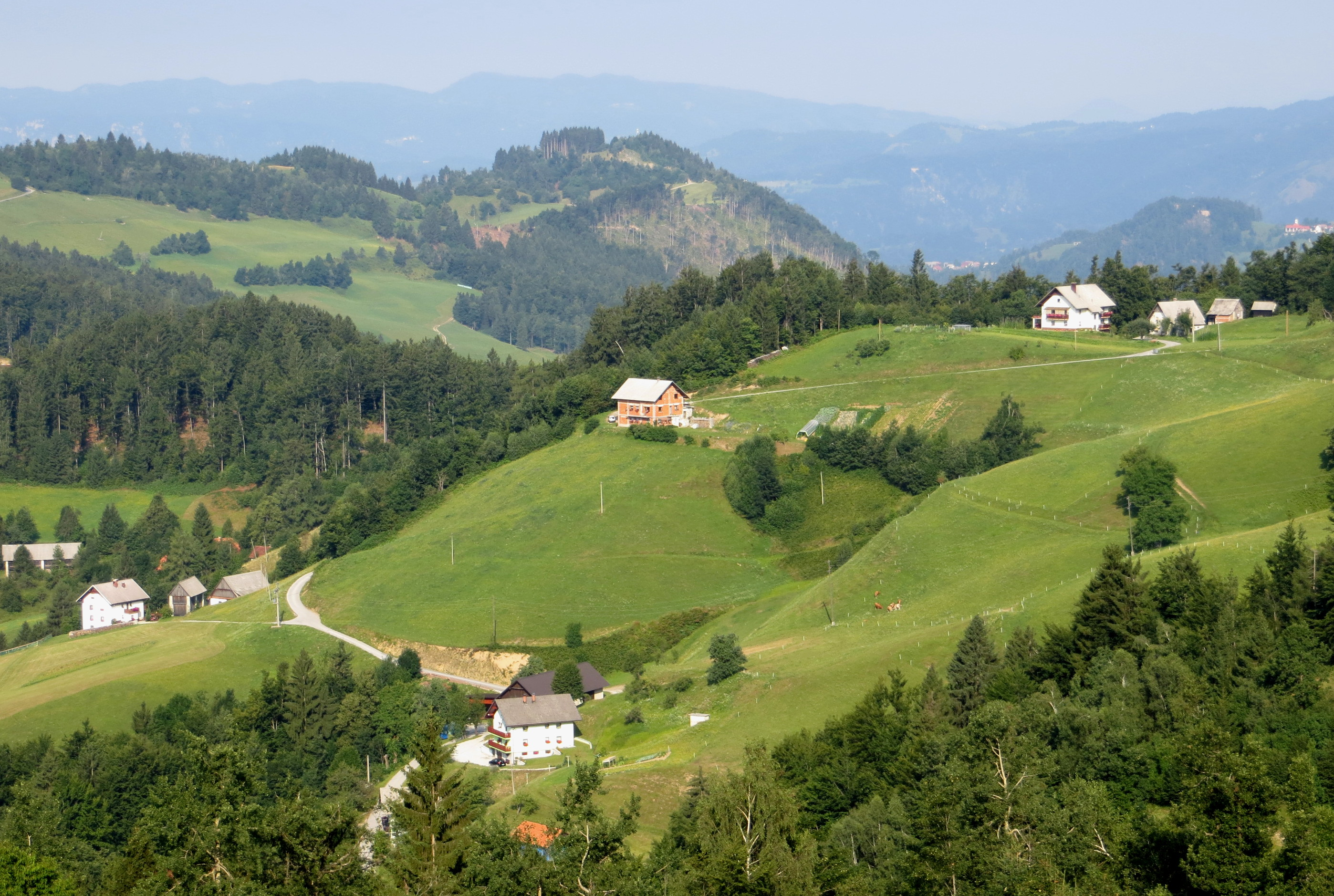

- Location in Slovenia
- Coordinates: 46°6′36.73″N 14°0′47.53″E
- Country: Slovenia
- Traditional region: Littoral
- Statistical region: Gorizia
- Municipality: Cerkno

Area
  - Total: 5.15 km^{2} (1.99 sq mi)
- Elevation: 788.8 m (2,588 ft)

Population (2020)
  - Total: 147
  - Density: 28.5/km^{2} (73.9/sq mi)

Podlanišče (pronounced [pɔdlaˈniːʃtsɛ]; German: Podlanischam) is a dispersed settlement in the hills southeast of Cerkno in the traditional Littoral region of Slovenia.
