= Cerkljanski Vrh =

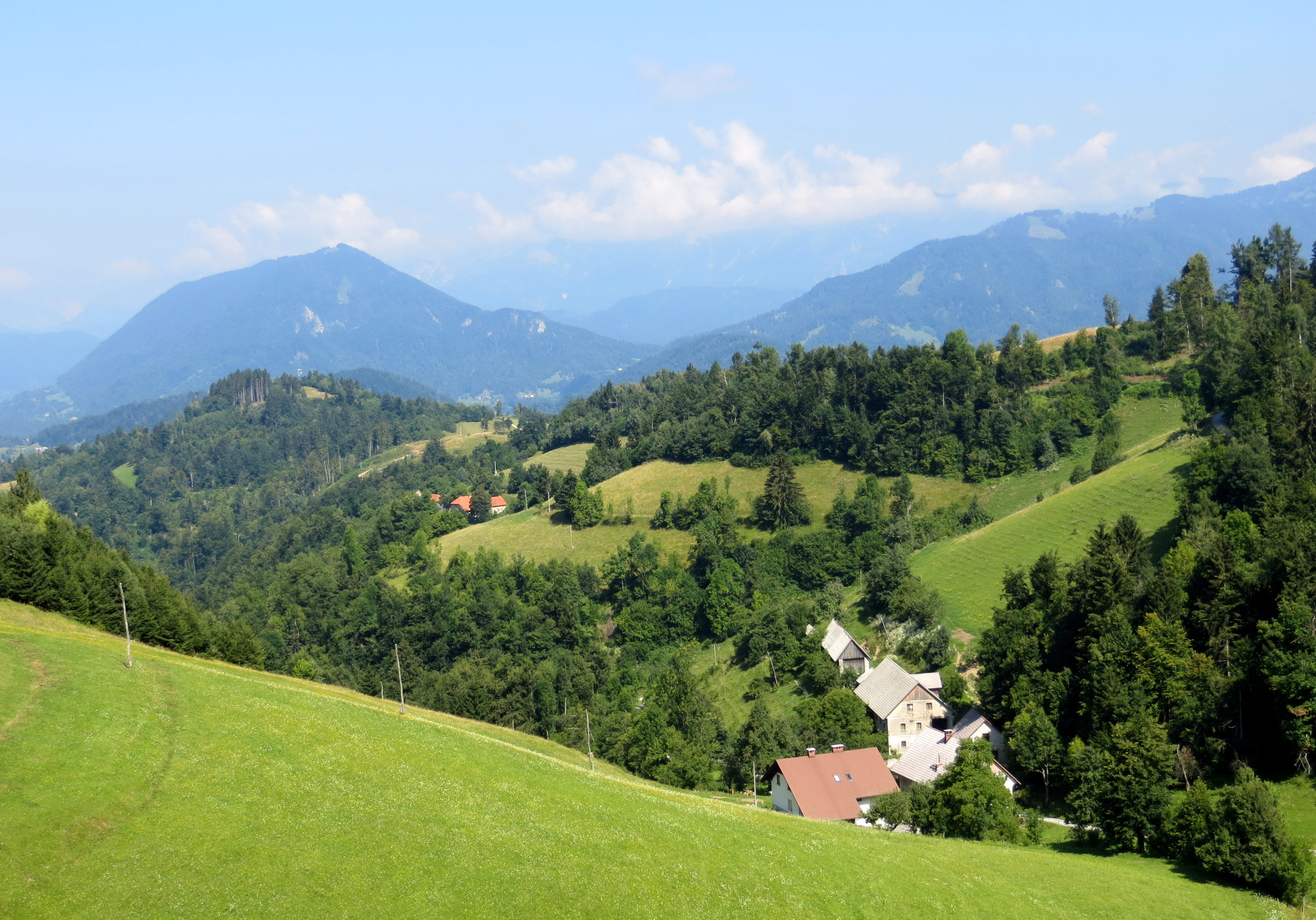

- Location in Slovenia
- Coordinates: 46°6′26.99″N 14°0′7.65″E
- Country: Slovenia
- Traditional region: Littoral
- Statistical region: Gorizia
- Municipality: Cerkno

Area
  - Total: 5.68 km^{2} (2.19 sq mi)
- Elevation: 836.3 m (2,744 ft)

Population (2020)
  - Total: 53
  - Density: 9.3/km^{2} (24/sq mi)

Cerkljanski Vrh (pronounced [tsɛɾˈkljaːnski ˈʋəɾx]) is a dispersed settlement in the hills south of Cerkno in the traditional Littoral region of Slovenia. It includes the hamlets and isolated farms of Bende, Kacin, Krog, Zakrog, Hobovše (German: Hobousche bei Neuoßlitz), Lajše, Mator, Na Ravan, Polanc, Stotnikar, Zakrog, and Za Vrhom.
