= Labinje =

- Location in Slovenia
- Coordinates: 46°8′32.64″N 14°0′3.99″E
- Country: Slovenia
- Traditional region: Littoral
- Statistical region: Gorizia
- Municipality: Cerkno

Area
  - Total: 1.73 km^{2} (0.67 sq mi)
- Elevation: 627.6 m (2,059 ft)

Population (2020)
  - Total: 81
  - Density: 47/km^{2} (120/sq mi)

Labinje (pronounced [ˈlaːbinjɛ]) is a village northeast of Cerkno in the traditional Littoral region of Slovenia.

The local church is dedicated to the Holy Spirit and belongs to the Parish of Cerkno. It was built in 1723 by the builder Matija Maček (c. 1657–1737) from the Poljane Valley.
