= Planina pri Cerknem =

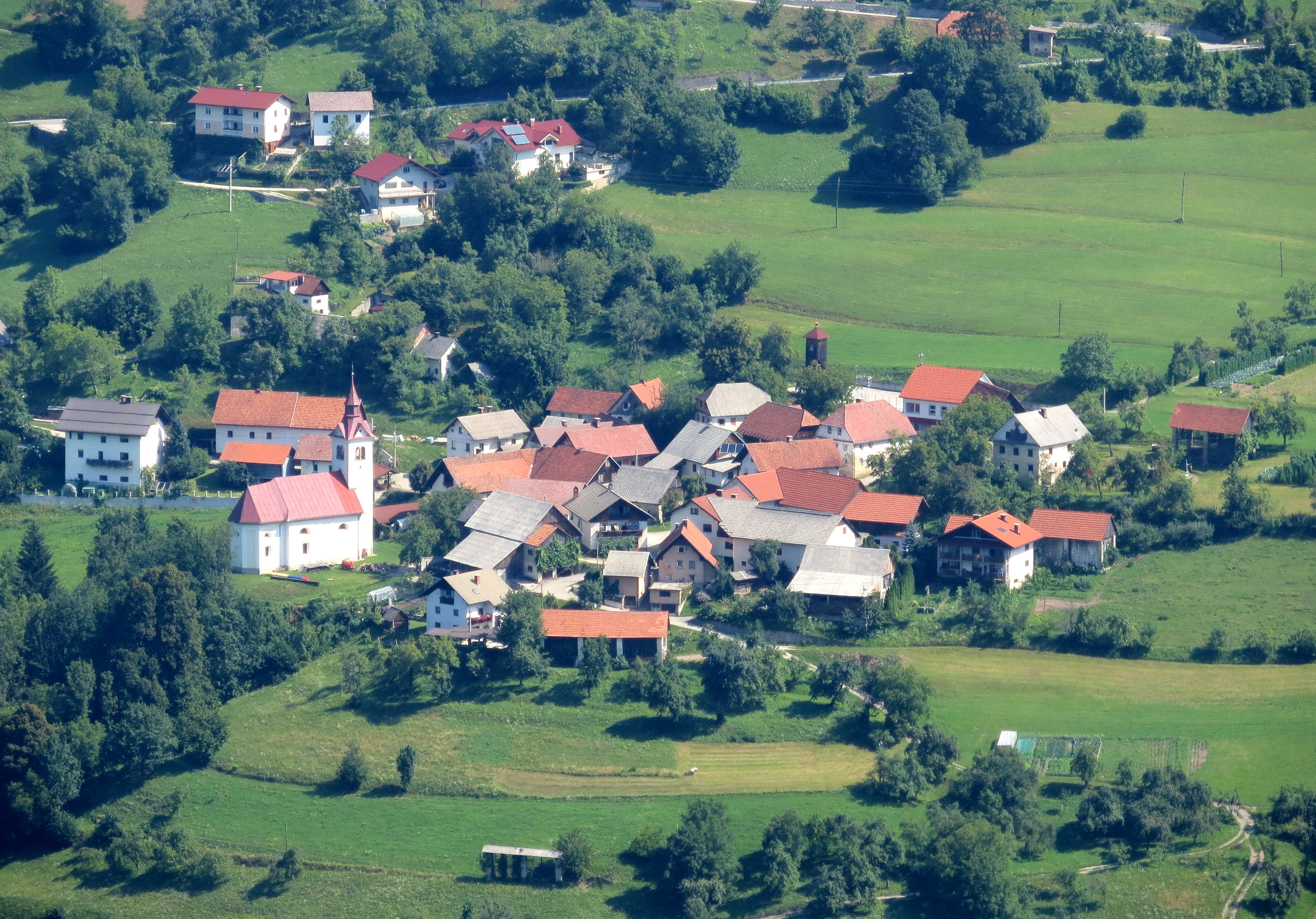

- Location in Slovenia
- Coordinates: 46°7′32.59″N 14°0′27.43″E
- Country: Slovenia
- Traditional region: Littoral
- Statistical region: Gorizia
- Municipality: Cerkno

Area
  - Total: 1.94 km^{2} (0.75 sq mi)
- Elevation: 600.9 m (1,971 ft)

Population (2020)
  - Total: 135
  - Density: 69.6/km^{2} (180/sq mi)

Planina pri Cerknem (pronounced [plaˈnìːna pɾi ˈtsèːɾknɛm]) is a village in the hills east of Cerkno in the traditional Littoral region of Slovenia.

== Name ==
The name of the settlement was changed from Planina to Planina pri Cerknem in 1955.

== Church ==
The local church is dedicated to John the Baptist and belongs to the Parish of Cerkno.

== Other cultural heritage ==
On the road to Čeplez there is a Partisan monument consisting of two pieces of concrete linked by four wooden beams. The concrete element to the left bears a plaque with the names of the fallen and a dedication. The monument was designed by J. Bizjak and was unveiled on 6 May 1973.
