= Gorenji Novaki =

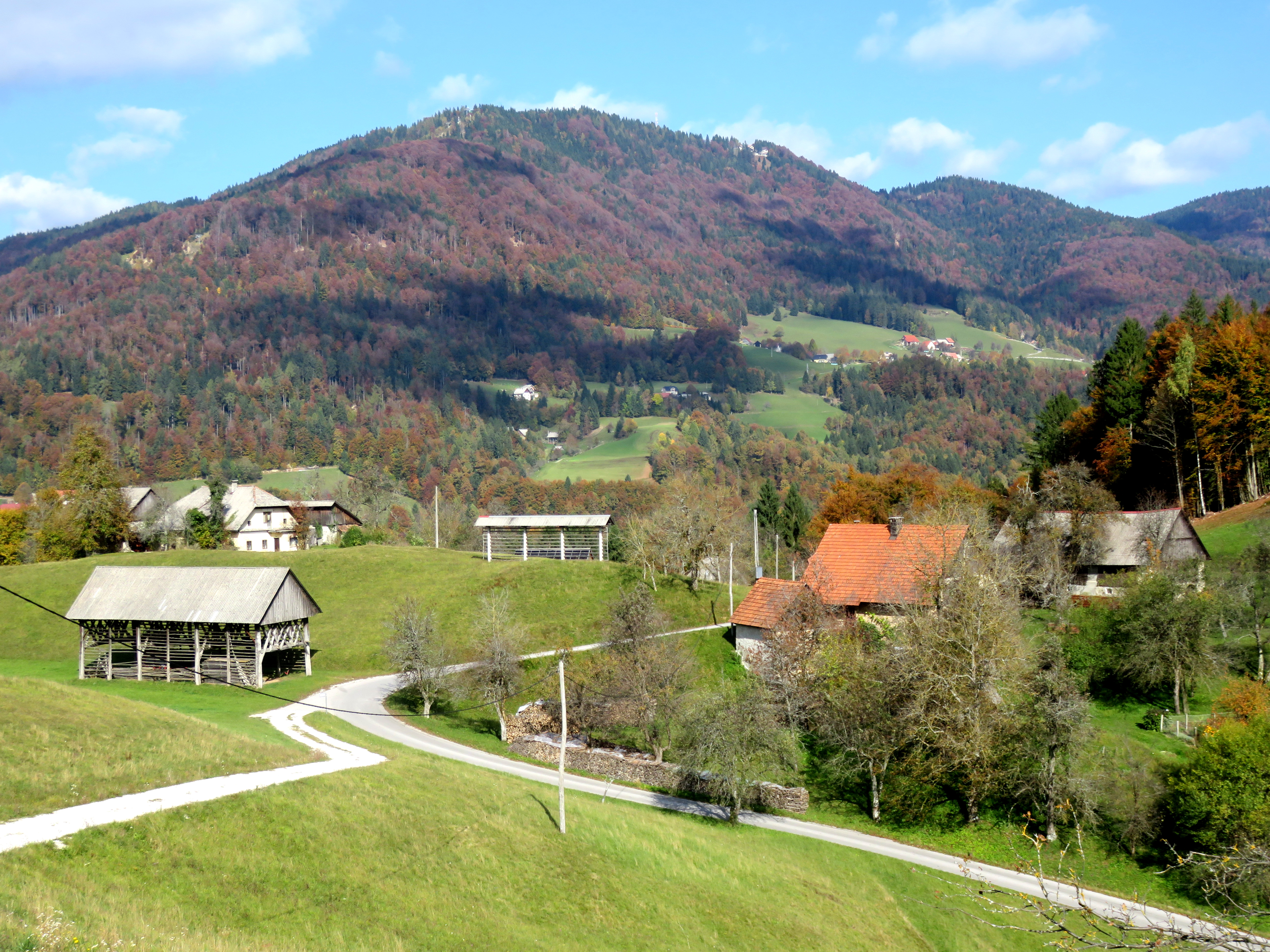

- Location in Slovenia
- Coordinates: 46°9′0.96″N 14°3′32.27″E
- Country: Slovenia
- Traditional region: Littoral
- Statistical region: Gorizia
- Municipality: Cerkno

Area
  - Total: 11.17 km^{2} (4.31 sq mi)
- Elevation: 753.6 m (2,472 ft)

Population (2020)
  - Total: 228
  - Density: 20.4/km^{2} (52.9/sq mi)

Gorenji Novaki (pronounced [ɡɔˈɾeːnji nɔˈʋaːki]; Italian: Novacchi) is a dispersed settlement in the Municipality of Cerkno in the traditional Littoral region of Slovenia.

== Name ==
The name Gorenji Novaki literally means 'upper Novaki', distinguishing the settlement from neighboring Dolenji Novaki, which stands about 126 meters (413 ft) lower in elevation. Together with Dolenji Novaki, Gorenji Novaki was attested in historical sources as Novak in 1337, Noathe in 1377, and Noach in 1380.

== Geography ==
Most of the ski slopes of the Cerkno Ski Resort are in the Gorenji Novaki area.
