= Poče =

- Location in Slovenia
- Coordinates: 46°9′13.24″N 13°59′2.67″E
- Country: Slovenia
- Traditional region: Littoral
- Statistical region: Gorizia
- Municipality: Cerkno

Area
  - Total: 6.06 km^{2} (2.34 sq mi)
- Elevation: 652.6 m (2,141 ft)

Population (2020)
  - Total: 91
  - Density: 15/km^{2} (39/sq mi)

Poče (pronounced [ˈpoːtʃɛ]) is a settlement in the hills north of Cerkno in the traditional Littoral region of Slovenia. The name of the settlement is derived from the word poč 'well', which is preserved in the Resian dialect.
