= Cerkno Hills =

Coordinates: 46°10′40.22″N 13°58′30.16″E

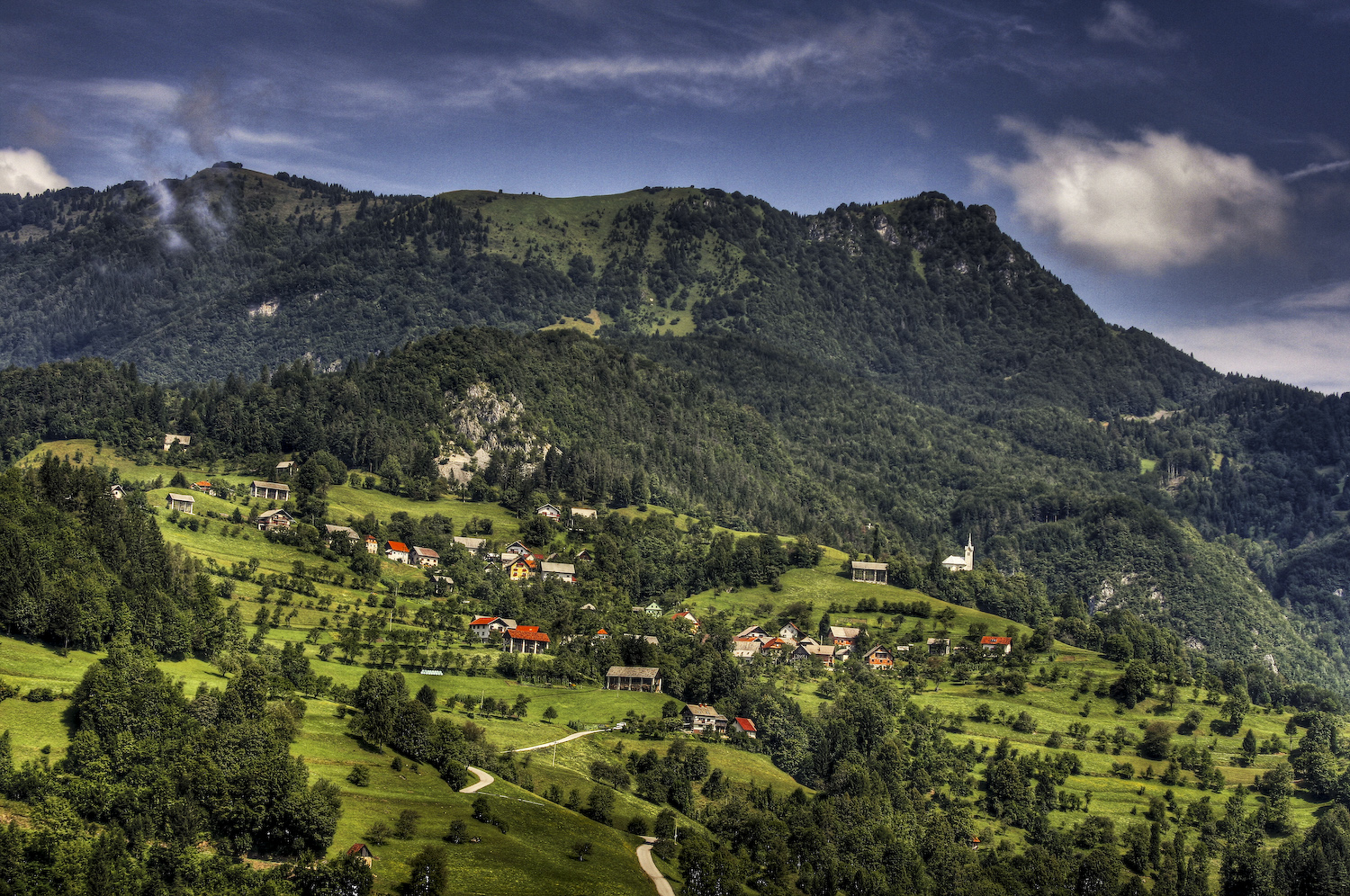
The Cerkno Hills and the village of Labinje, northeast of Cerkno

The Cerkno Hills (Slovene: Cerkljansko hribovje or Cerkljansko) is a transitional region between the Alpine and the Dinaric landscape, centered on Cerkno in northwestern Slovenia. Several passes in this area connect the Poljane Valley and the Selca Valley with the Idrijca Valley and the Soča Valley. The highest peak is Porezen (1,630 metres or 5,350 feet).

The landscape is geologically very diverse and one of the most interesting in Slovenia in this regard. Among the steep hills, numerous ravines and valleys have been carved out by the Cerknica River and its tributaries.

The Cerkno Hills and the people who live there were presented in the 2011 documentary The Slope to the Home (Klanec do doma), directed by Dušan Moravec and edited by Jurij Moškon.
