= Dolenji Novaki =

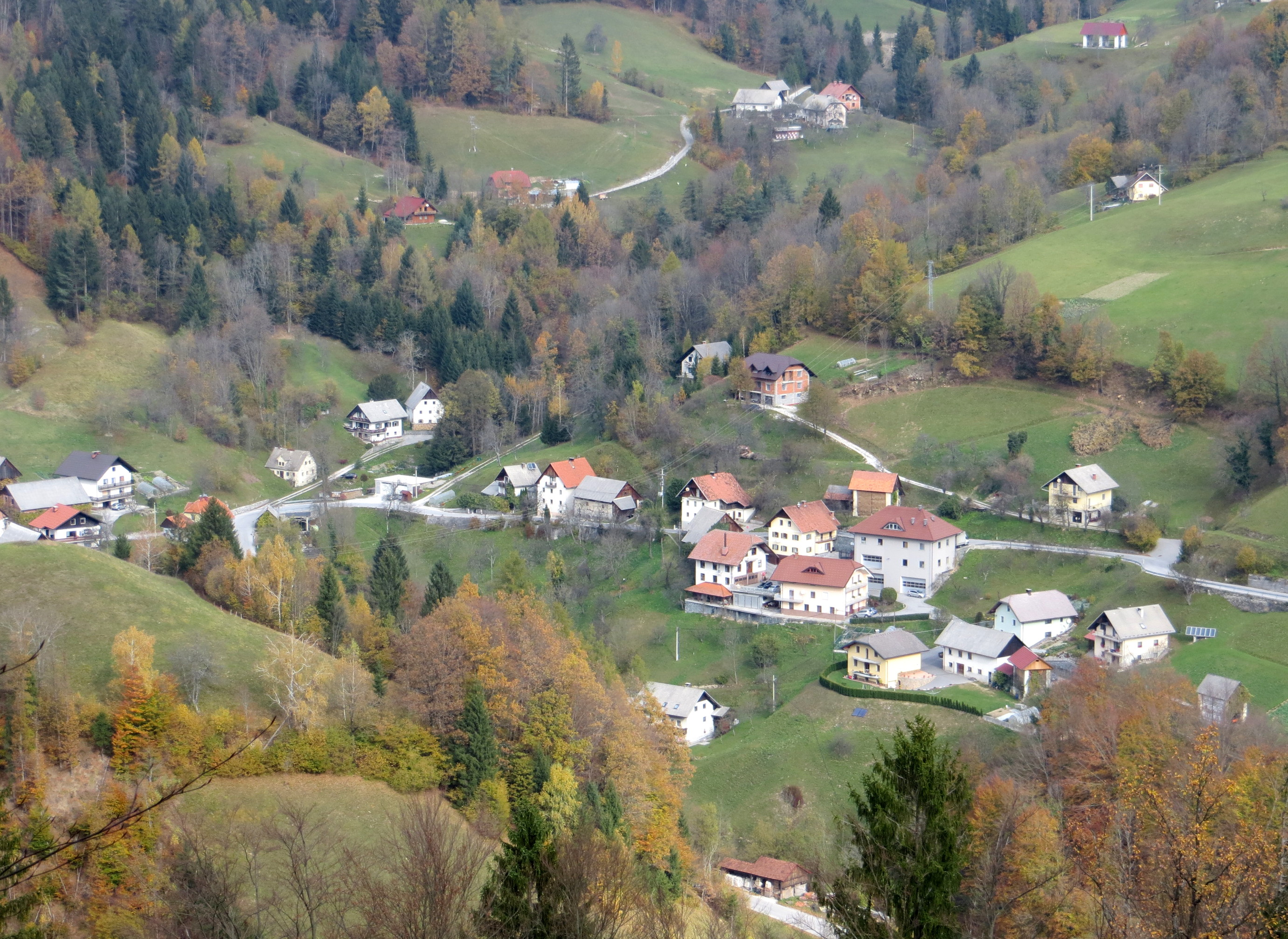

- Location in Slovenia
- Coordinates: 46°9′6.55″N 14°2′24.13″E
- Country: Slovenia
- Traditional region: Littoral
- Statistical region: Gorizia
- Municipality: Cerkno

Area
  - Total: 4.13 km^{2} (1.59 sq mi)
- Elevation: 627.8 m (2,060 ft)

Population (2020)
  - Total: 227
  - Density: 55.0/km^{2} (142/sq mi)

Dolenji Novaki (Slovene pronunciation: [dɔˈleːnji nɔˈʋaːki]) is a village in the Municipality of Cerkno in the traditional Littoral region of Slovenia.

== Name ==
The name Dolenji Novaki literally means 'lower Novaki', distinguishing the settlement from neighboring Gorenji Novaki, which stands about 126 meters (413 ft) higher in elevation. Together with Gorenji Novaki, Dolenji Novaki was attested in historical sources as Novak in 1337, Noathe in 1377, and Noach in 1380.

== History ==
Franja Partisan Hospital is located in a valley north of the settlement.

== Church ==
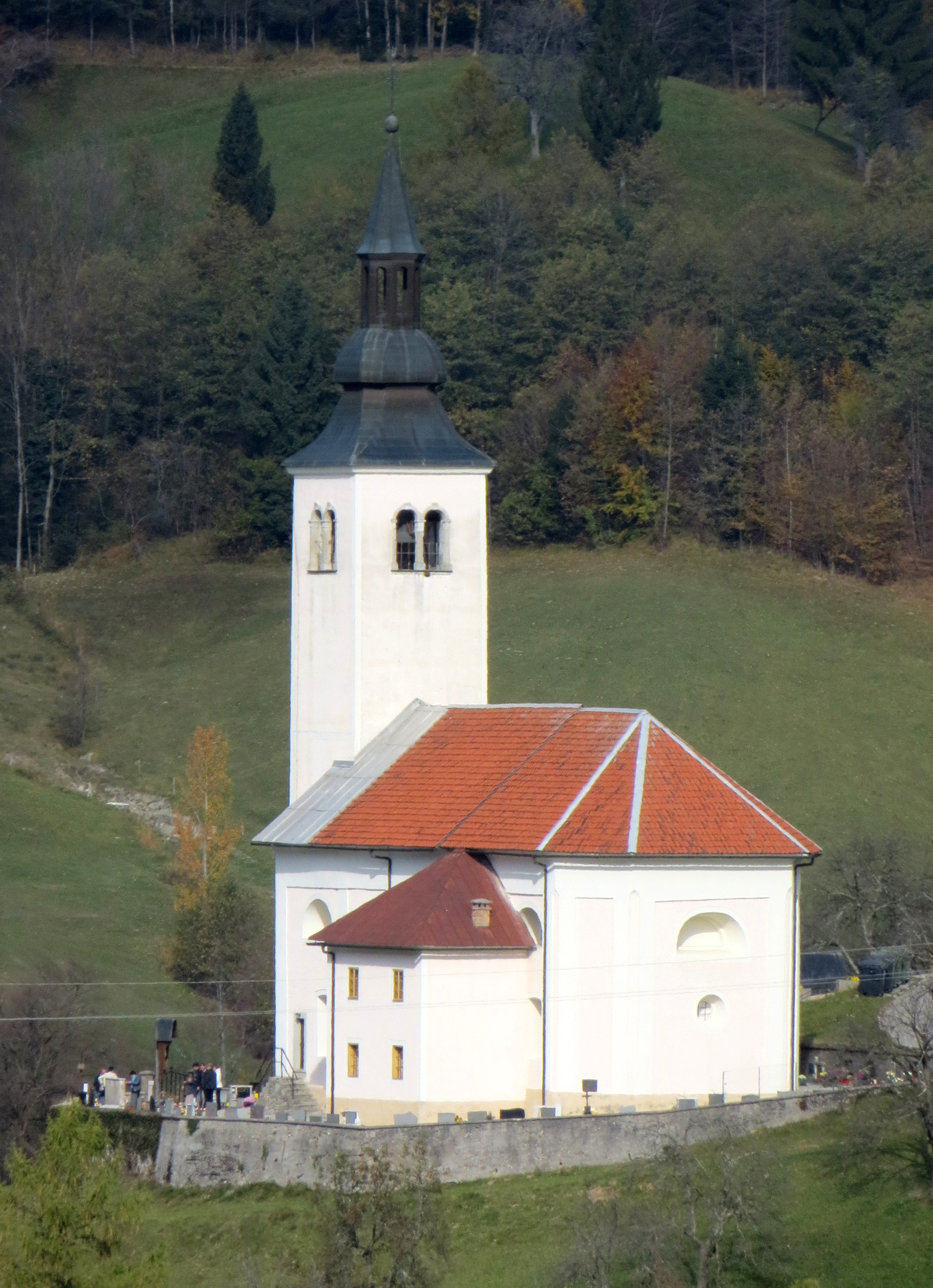
Saint Thomas's Church

The parish church in the village is dedicated to Saint Thomas and belongs to the Koper Diocese.
