= Otalež =

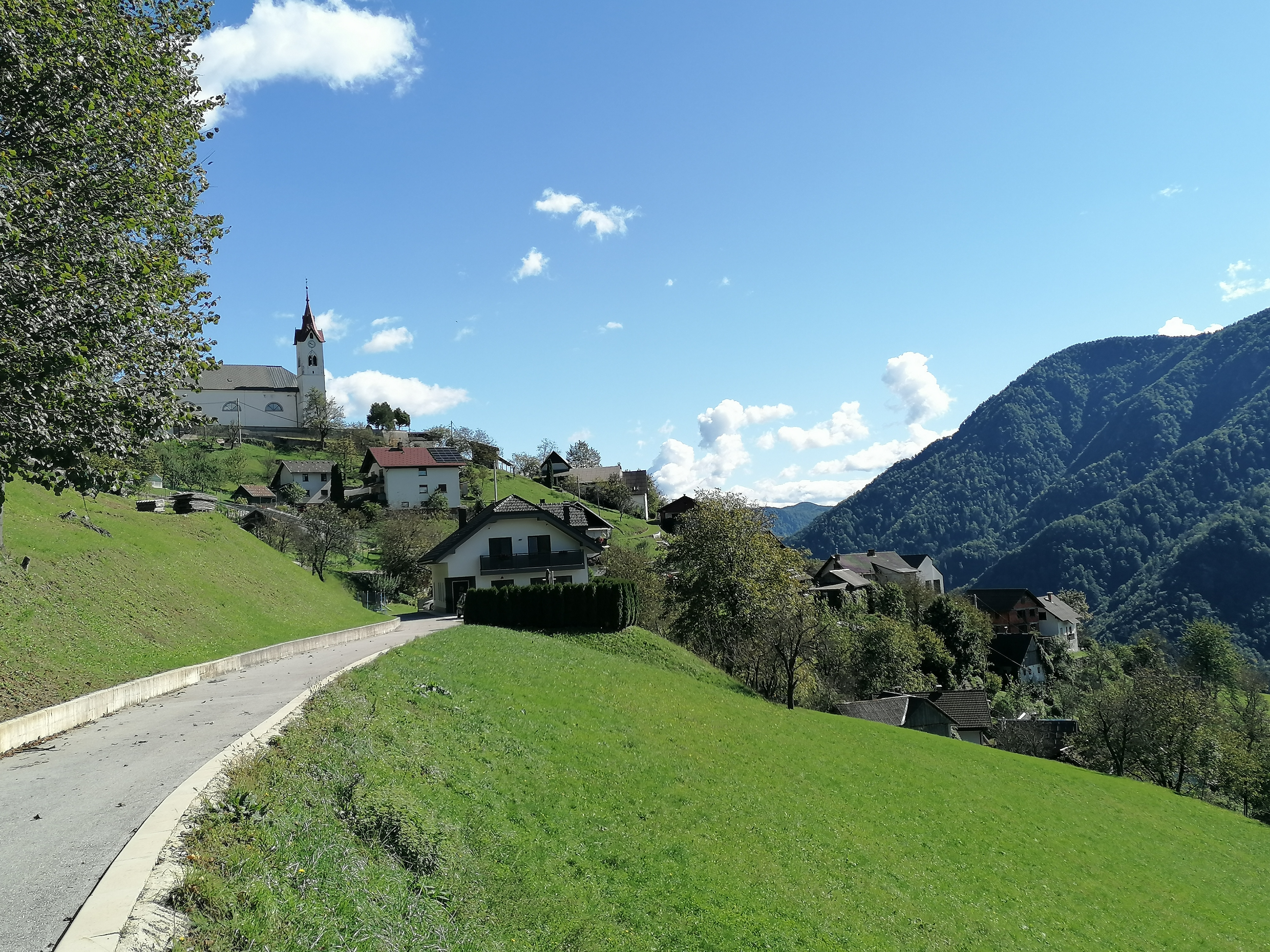

- Location in Slovenia
- Coordinates: 46°4′44.33″N 13°59′33.2″E
- Country: Slovenia
- Traditional region: Littoral
- Statistical region: Gorizia
- Municipality: Cerkno

Area
  - Total: 2.67 km^{2} (1.03 sq mi)
- Elevation: 597.8 m (1,961 ft)

Population (2020)
  - Total: 126
  - Density: 47.2/km^{2} (122/sq mi)

Otalež (pronounced [ɔˈtaːlɛʃ]) is a village in the Cerkno Hills above the right bank of the Idrijca River in the Municipality of Cerkno in the traditional Littoral region of Slovenia.

The parish church in the settlement is dedicated to Saint Catherine and belongs to the Koper Diocese.
