= Jerebica =

Mountain in northwest Slovenia

- Italian: Cima del Lago
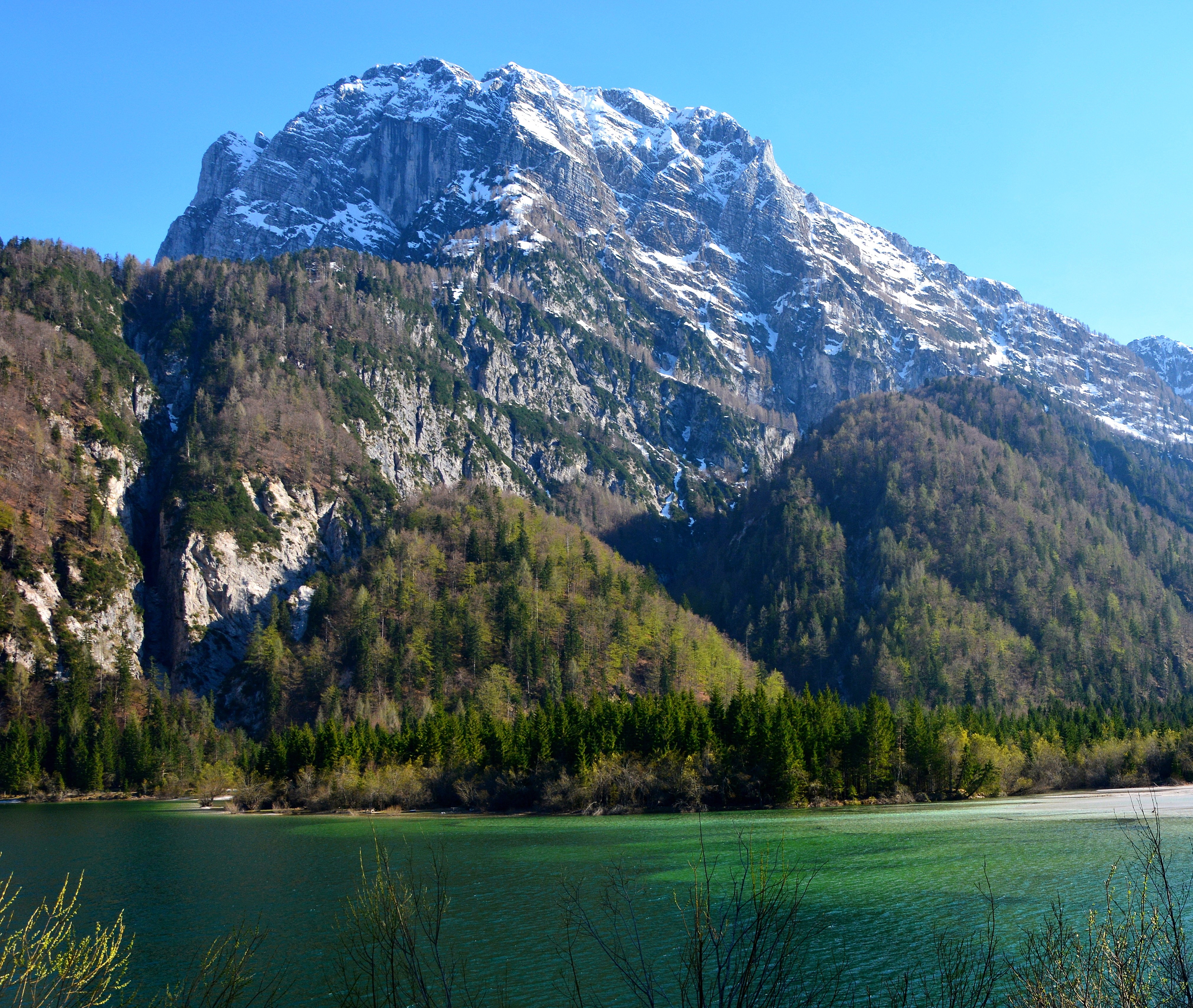
- North aspect

Highest point
- Elevation: 2,126 m (6,975 ft)
- Prominence: 427 m (1,401 ft)
- Isolation: 3.54 km (2.20 mi)
- Listing: Prominent mountains of the Alps
- Coordinates: 46.398261°N 13.564953°E

Naming
- English translation: partridge

Geography
- Location within Slovenia Location within Italy Location within Alps
- Location: Littoral, Slovenia; Udine, Italy
- Protected area: Triglav National Park
- Parent range: Alps; Julian Alps

Climbing
- Easiest route: scramble / via ferrata

Jerebica (pronounced [jɛrɛbìːt͡sa]; German: Raibler Seekopf; Italian: Cima del Lago), with an elevation of 2,126 metres (6,975 ft 3/4 in), is one of the two-thousand-meter mountains (dvatisočaki) in the Julian Alps of Slovenia. Set on the Italy–Slovenia border, the mountain is located two kilometers immediately south of Lake Predil and five kilometers north of the town of Bovec. It is part of Triglav National Park.

The peak can be reached via trails starting from the Možnica Valley near Log pod Mangartom or from the Rio Bianco Valley (Bele vode) between Sella Nevea (Na Žlebeh) and Cave del Predil (Rabelj).

== Climate ==
Based on the Köppen climate classification, Jerebica is located in an alpine climate zone with long, cold winters, and short, mild summers. Weather systems are forced upward by the mountains (orographic lift), causing moisture to drop in the form of rain and snow. The months of June through September offer the most favorable weather for visiting or climbing in this area.

== Gallery ==
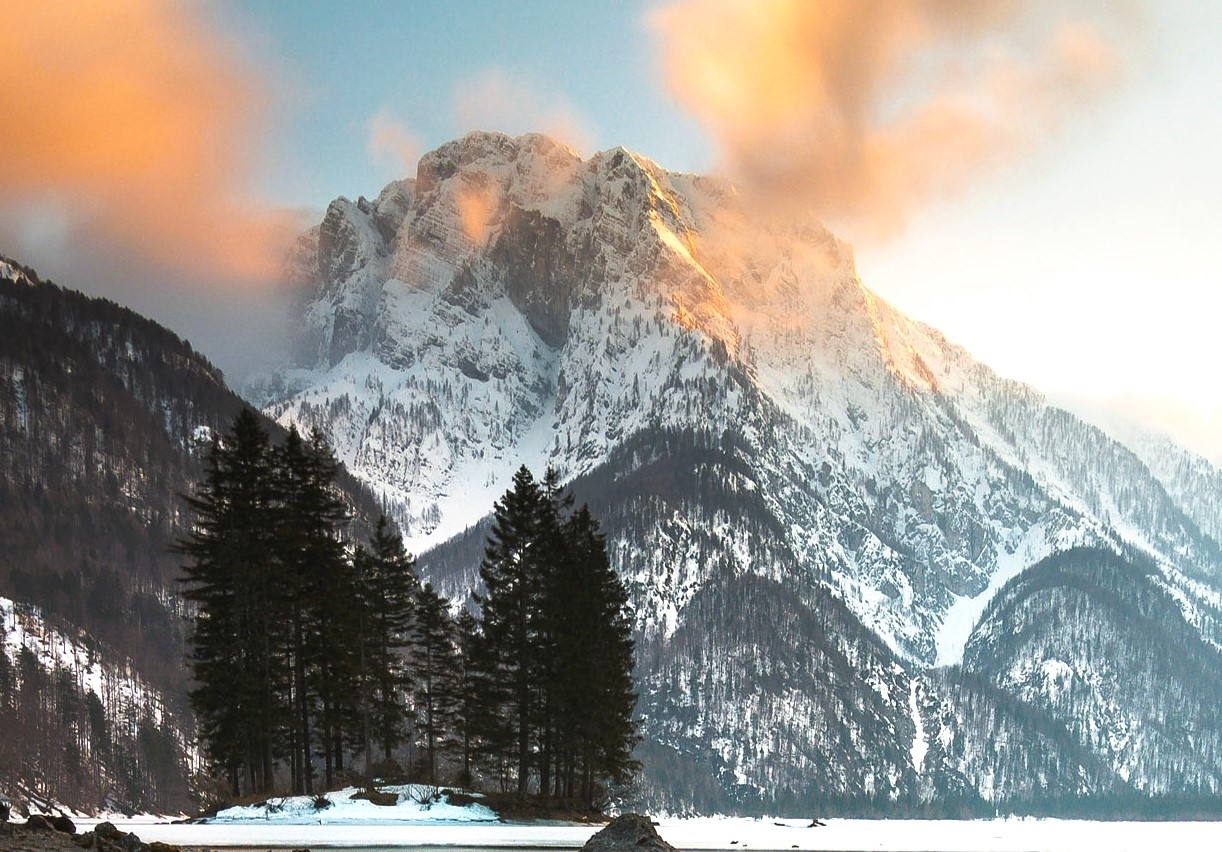
Jerebica in winter

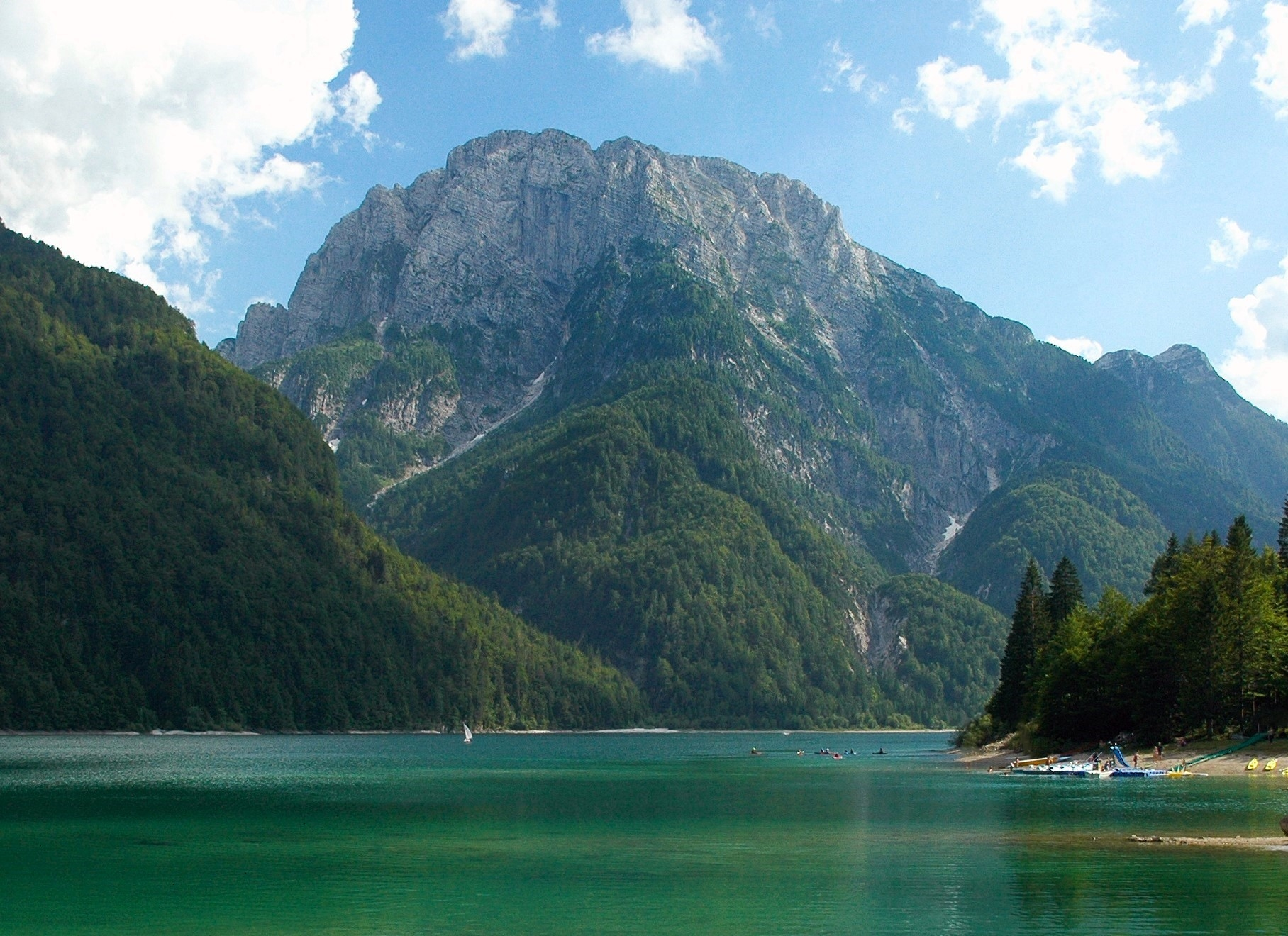
North aspect of Jerebica viewed from Lago del Predil

== See also ==
- Geography of the Alps
- Southern Limestone Alps
- Triglav National Park
