= Predil Pass =

Mountain pass on border between Italy and Slovenia

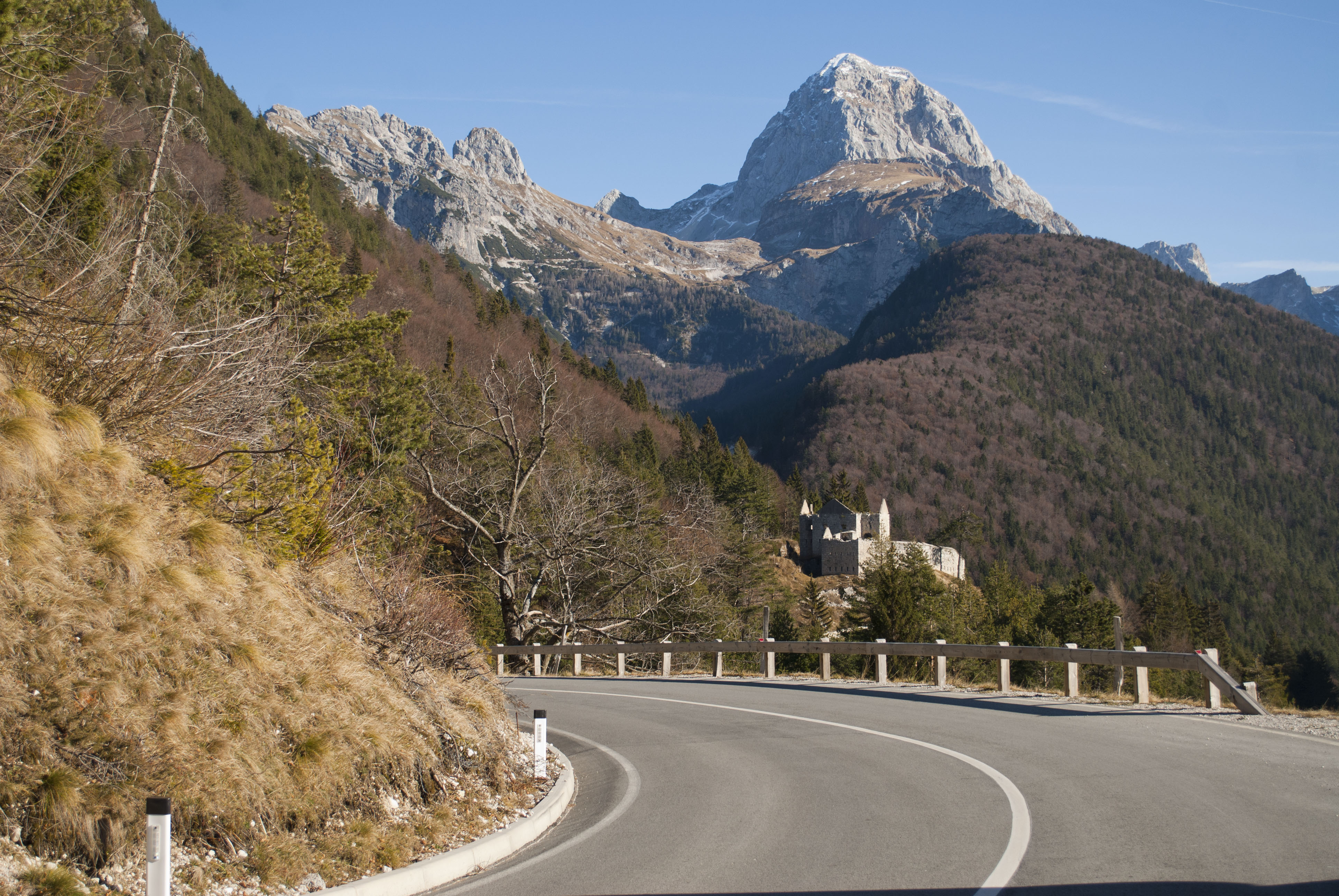
- Pass road with Mount Mangart

- Location within Alps
- Elevation: 1,156 metres (3,793 ft)

Third Approach
- Location: Italy–Slovenia border
- Coordinates: 46°25′7″N 13°34′47″E

The Predil Pass, also known as the Predel Pass (Italian: Passo di Predil; Slovene: Predel, pronounced [pɾɛˈdeːl]; elevation 1,156 meters or 3,793 feet), is a high mountain pass on the border between Italy and Slovenia.

== Geography ==
Map of pass road and tunnel

The pass is located in the Julian Alps, between the peaks of Mount Mangart to the north and Mount Kanin to the south. It connects Cave del Predil, part of the Italian municipality of Tarvisio in the northwest, with the Municipality of Bovec in the Upper Soča (Isonzo) Valley in Slovenia.

On the Italian side, state highway no. 54 (del Friuli) leads from Tarvisio and the Canal Valley along Slizza Creek to Lake Predil, where the route to the Sella Nevea Pass in the south branches off, and uphill to the Predil crest. On the Slovenian side, road no. 203 runs downhill to Log pod Mangartom and continues to Bovec. The village of Strmec na Predelu lies just below the border crossing.

== History ==
The road was built from 1319 onwards by the citizens of Cividale in the Patriarchate of Aquileia with the consent of the Prince-Bishops of Bamberg, then the possessors of the Carinthian lands in the north. However, the importance of the trade route diminished after the Aquileia territory in the south was incorporated into the Domini di Terraferma by the Republic of Venice in 1420.

Since 1754 the Predil Pass marked the border between the Duchy of Carinthia with the lands of the Princely County of Gorizia and Gradisca (part of the Austrian Littoral from 1849) in the southeast, both part of the Habsburg monarchy. During the War of the Fifth Coalition, an Austrian contingent under Captain Johann Hermann von Hermannsdorf on 18 May 1809 fought against the French forces moving from the Kingdom of Italy upon the Battle of Tarvis. Hermannsdorf was killed in battle, in 1851 a memorial was erected in his honour.

In 1903 a 4.5 km (2.8 mi) long tunnel (Štoln) was built beneath the pass, serving miners from Log pod Mangartom on their way to the lead mines in Cave del Predil. In World War I the mine railway was used to supply the Austro-Hungarian Army in the Battles of the Isonzo against the Kingdom of Italy.

== Gallery ==
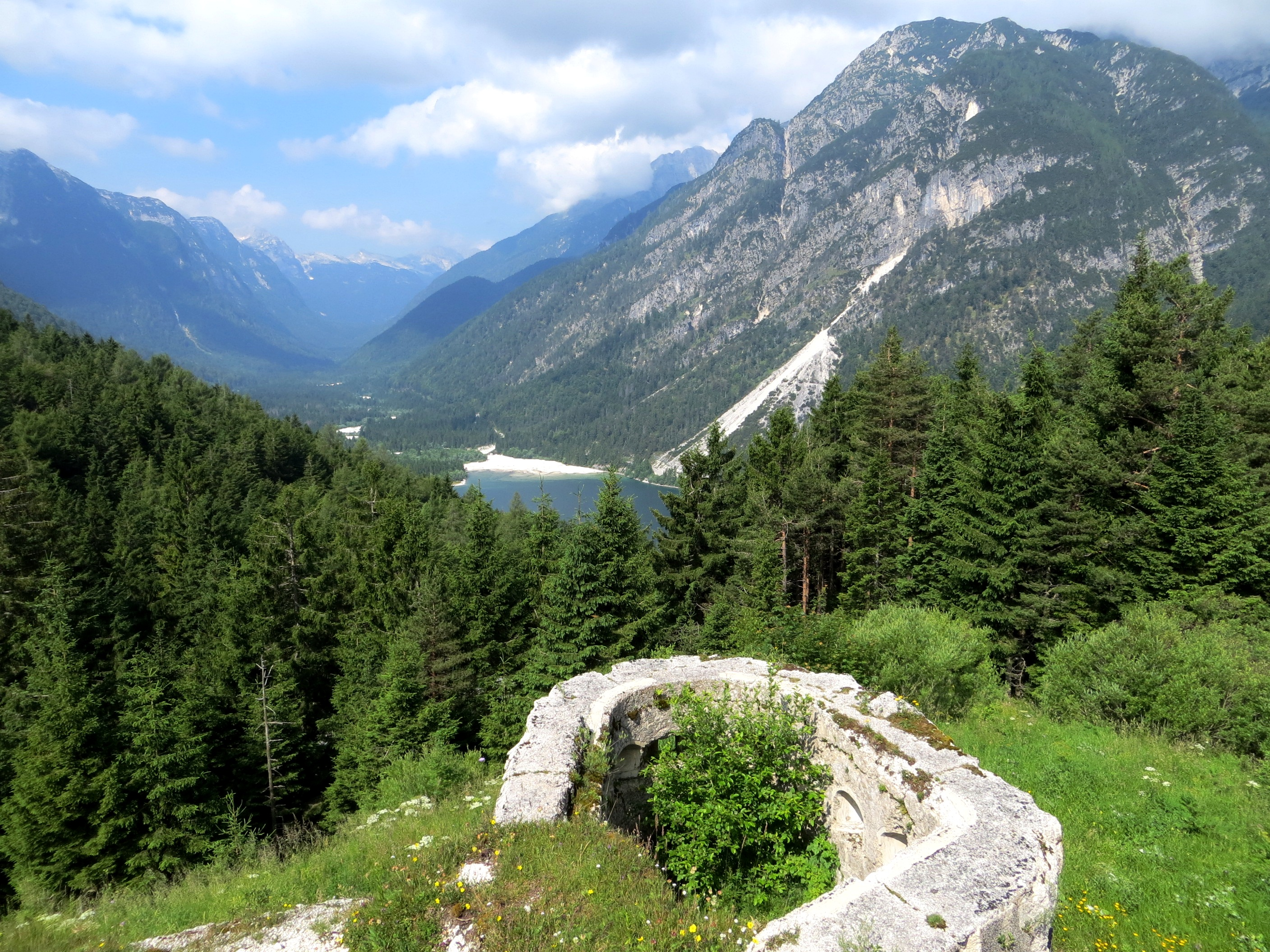
West view from the pass, showing Lake Predil

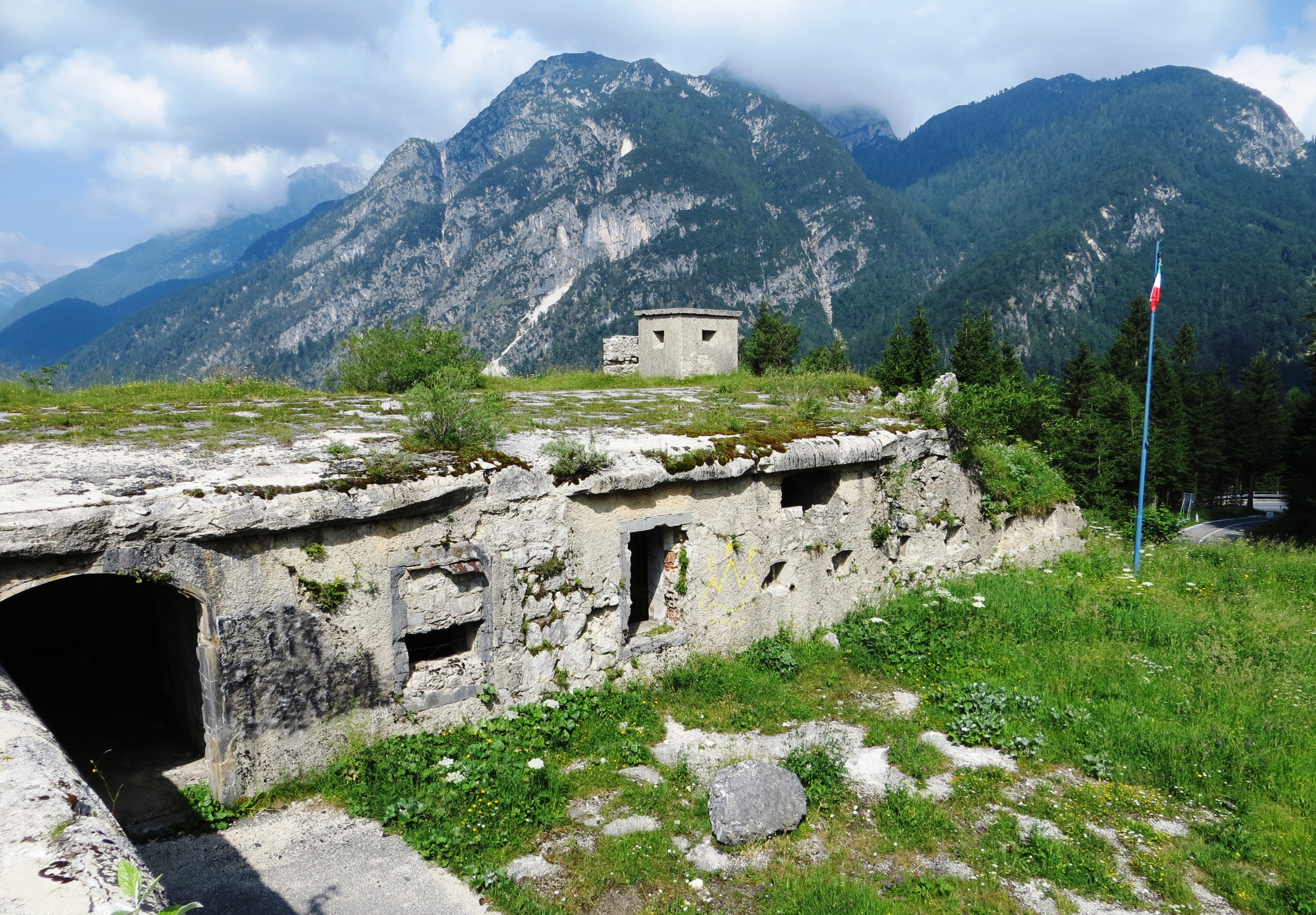
Fortification on the Italian side of the pass

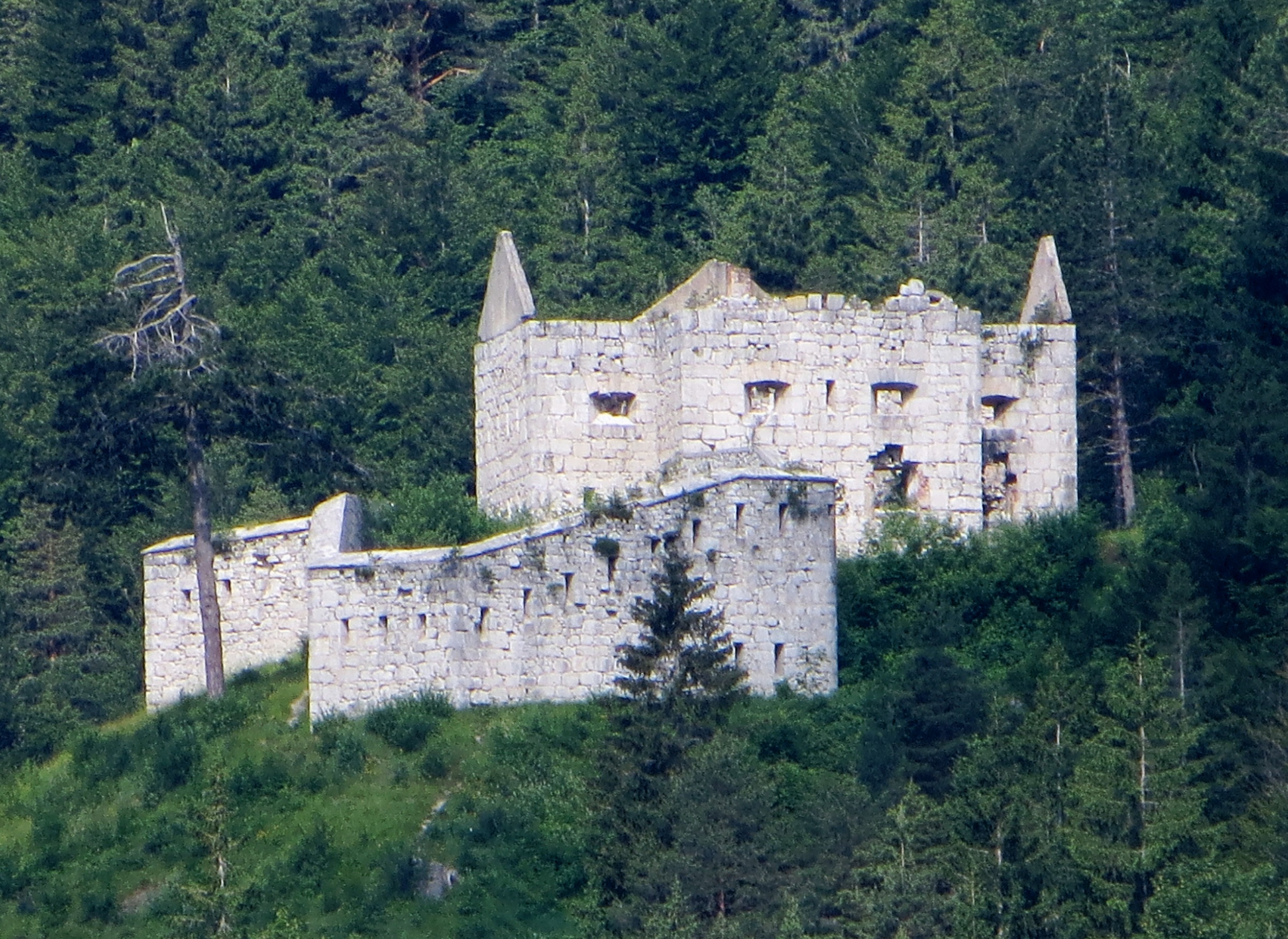
Austrian fort on the Slovenian side of the pass

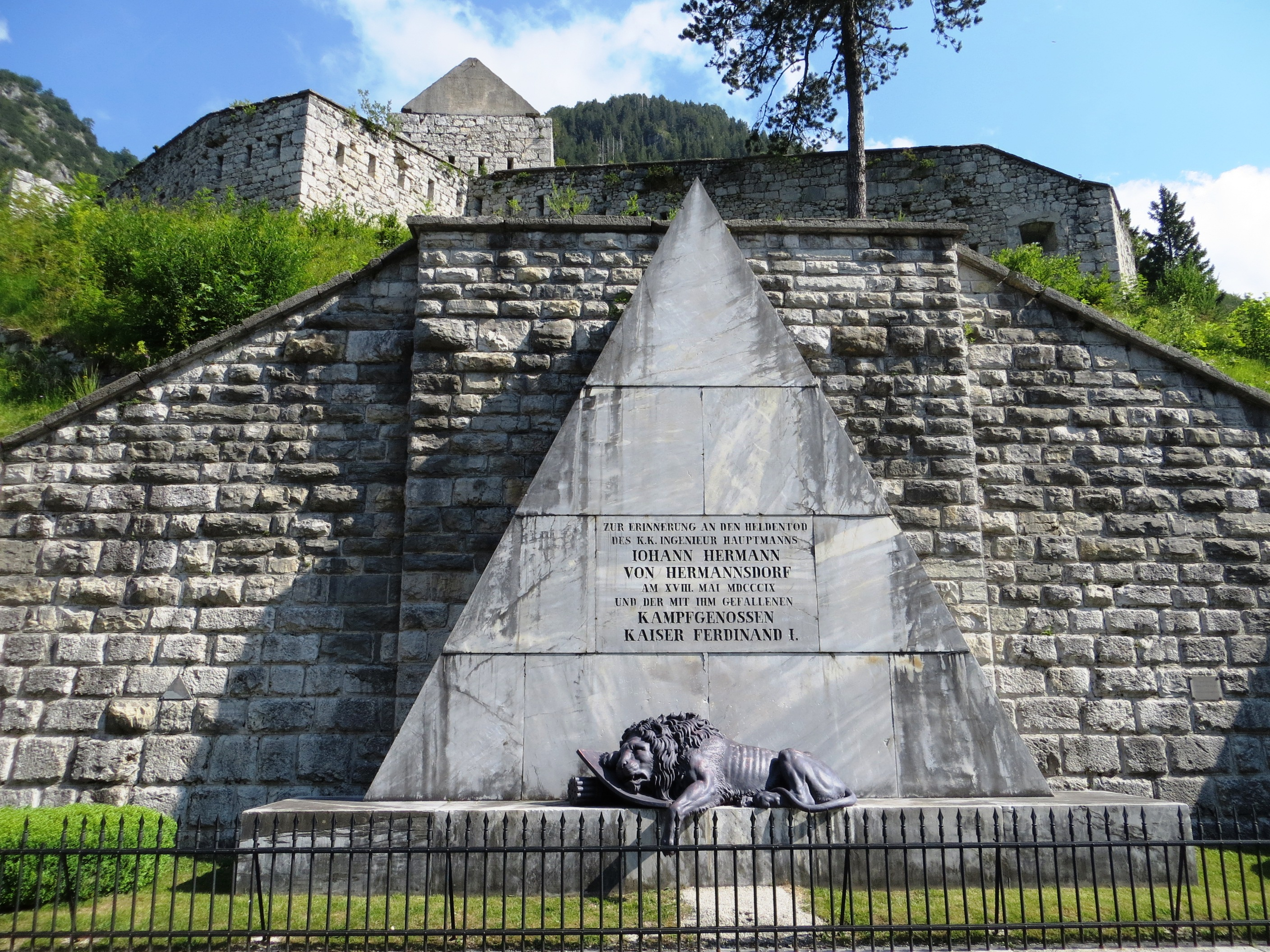
Monument to troops killed at the pass in 1809

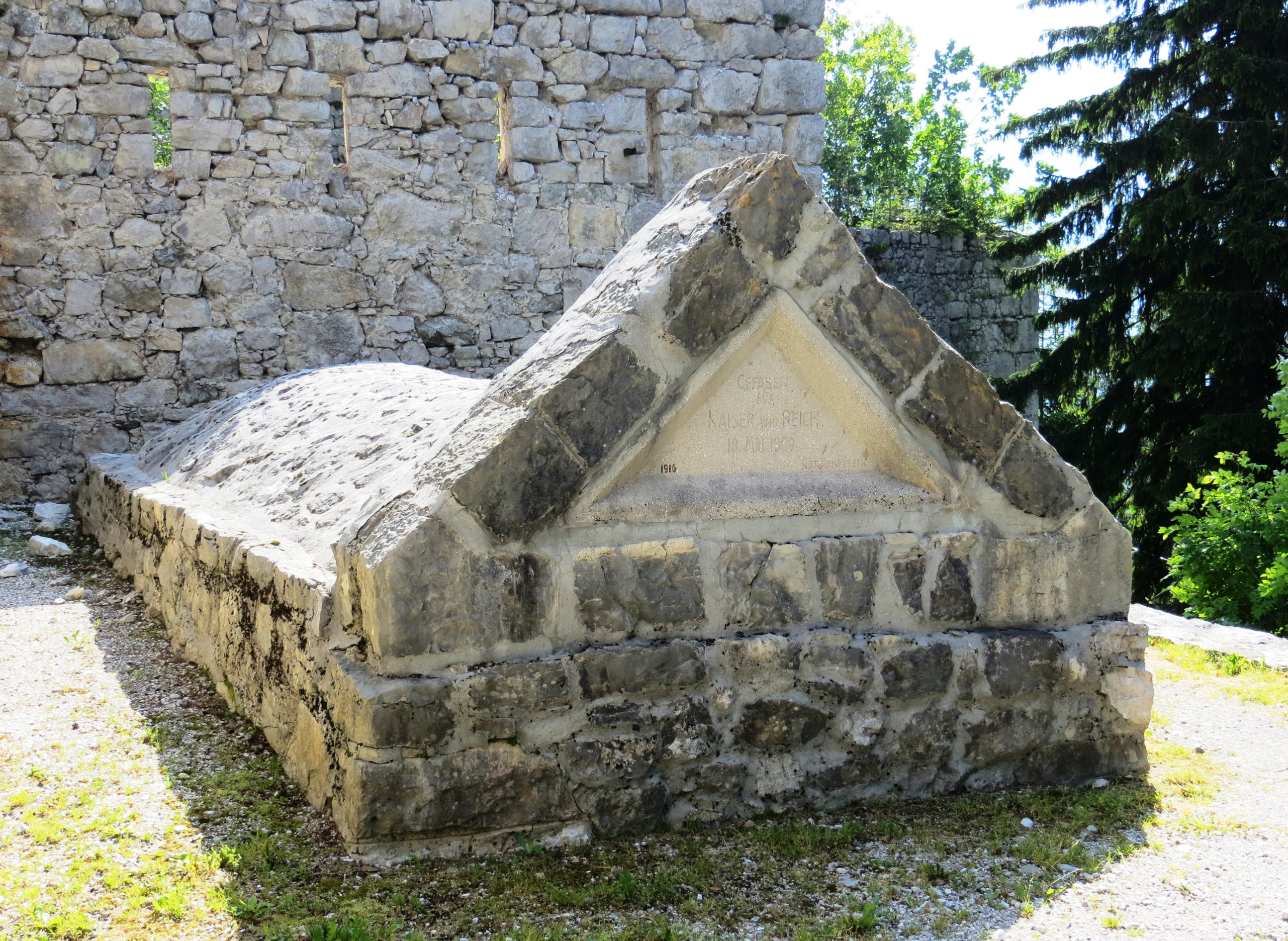
Grave of Austrian troops killed at the pass in 1809

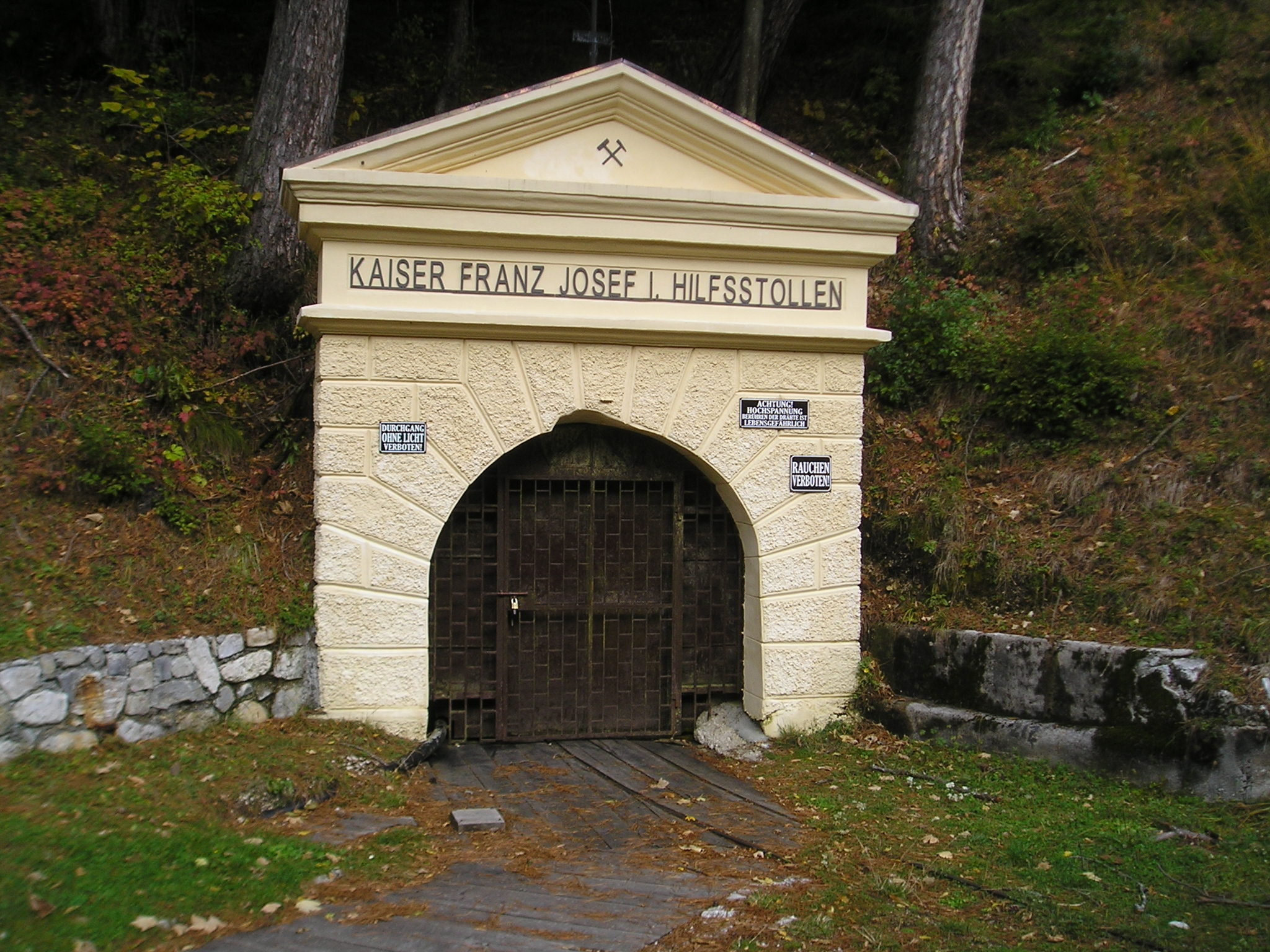
Tunnel entrance in Log pod Mangartom

== See also ==
- List of highest paved roads in Europe
- List of mountain passes
