= Slizza =

Slizza Gailitz
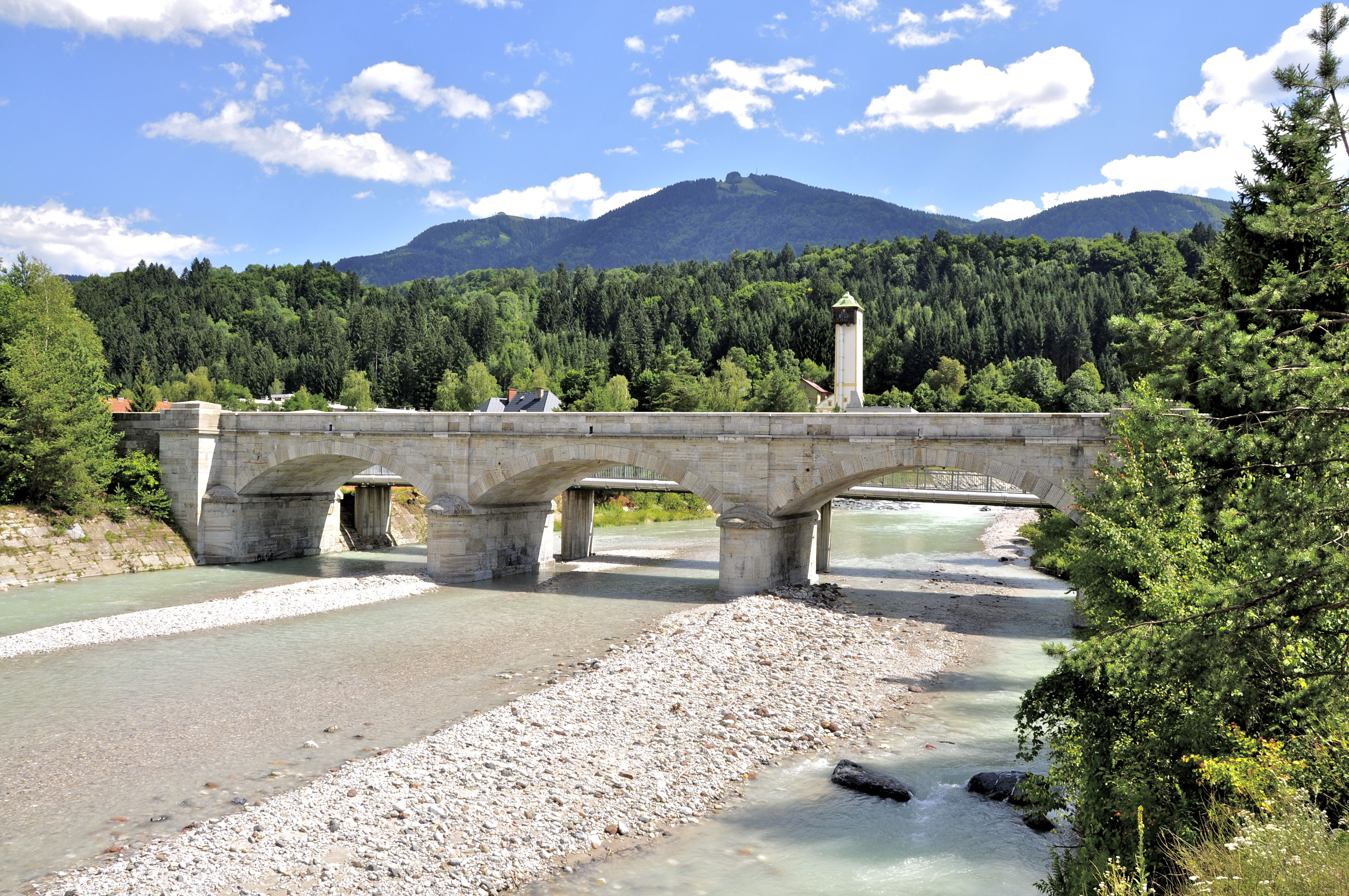
- Gailitz bridge between Arnoldstein and Hohenthurn

Location
- Countries: Italy and Austria

Physical characteristics
- Source
  - location: Sella Nevea (Italy)
  - elevation: 1,190 m (3,900 ft)
- Mouth
  - location: Gail at Arnoldstein
  - coordinates: 46°34′13″N 13°41′24″E
  - elevation: 548 m (1,798 ft)
- Length: 29.8 km (18.5 mi)
- Basin size: 212.5 km^{2} (82.0 sq mi)
- Discharge
  - average: 7.9 m^{3} (280 cu ft)

Basin features
- Progression: Gail→ Drava→ Danube→ Black Sea

The Slizza (Italian) or Gailitz (German; Friulian: Slize, Slovene: Ziljica) is an Alpine torrent in Italy and Austria, a right tributary of the river Gail. Its drainage basin is 212.5 km^{2} (82.0 sq mi).

== Course ==
Its source is below the Sella Nevea mountain pass in the Julian Alps, where it is known as the Rio del Lago (Seebach). It flows in a north-easterly direction through Lago del Predil and via Cave del Predil down towards the town of Tarvisio. Here it enters the broad Val Canale and its waters are swelled by a number of tributaries. Near the village of Coccau it is joined by the Rio di Fussine and at the village of Thörl, it crosses the border with Carinthia, Austria, where it is called the Gailitz. It then passes through Arnoldstein before flowing into the Gail.

The water quality of the Gailitz in Austria has significantly improved since the closure of the Arnoldstein lead works in 1987/88. Today it is again the home range of fish like brown trout, grayling and even European bullhead.
