= Predil Battery =

Austro-Hungarian fortification near the Italo-Slovenian Border

The Predil Battery is an Austro-Hungarian fortification built on the shores of Lake Predil on the Italian-Slovenian border. Work started on June 22, 1897, and ended on Sept. 24, 1899. Predil's armament was three 12 cm guns, and an unspecified amount of 8 mm machine guns. Despite being located 1,125m high, Predil couldn't engage enemies at long range due to the building site.

== World War I ==
Before Italy's declaration of war on May 23, 1915, the drilling out of a cave battery was begun. By the time Italy declared war, most of the guns were still in the fort due to a lack of drills to carve out the battery. Between May 25 and 26, the first guns were moved into the cave battery. On May 27, Italian 21 cm mortars bombarded the fort. By June 5, all personnel except the sentries were removed from the fort.

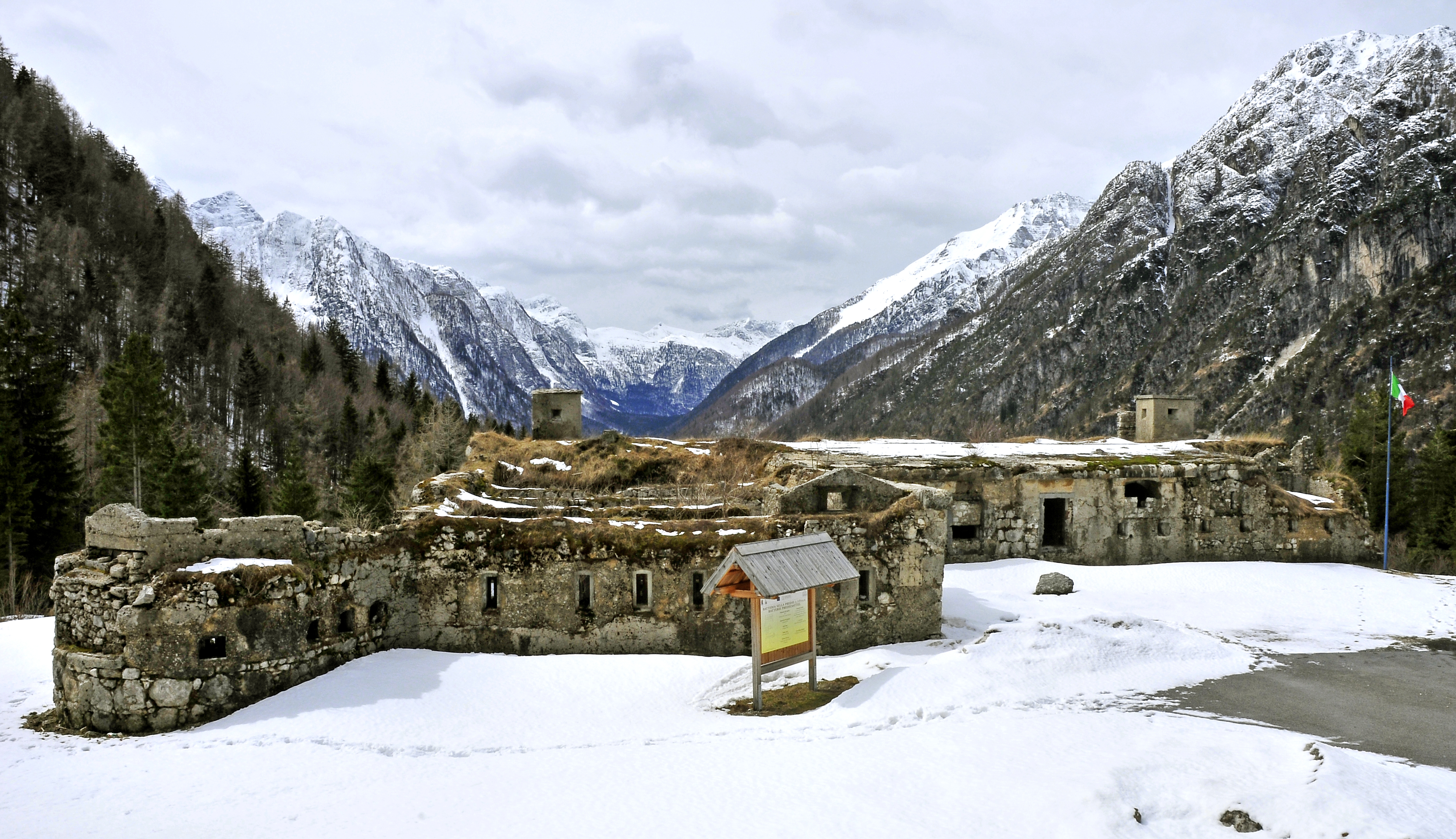
What remains of the Predil Battery today is not much, a few damaged walls.

Between June 7 and 11, the second gun was removed and placed in the cave battery. On June 12, Italian 30.5 cm shells began raining down on the fort. Between June 16 and 21, the third and final gun was removed to the cave battery. Later in the war, the Italians realised that the guns were emplaced in a cave battery and tried to destroy the openings of the battery, but with no success. During the Austrian Capporetto Offensive of 1917, the guns were removed from the cave battery and were used as mobile artillery.
