= Sella Nevea =

- Nevee
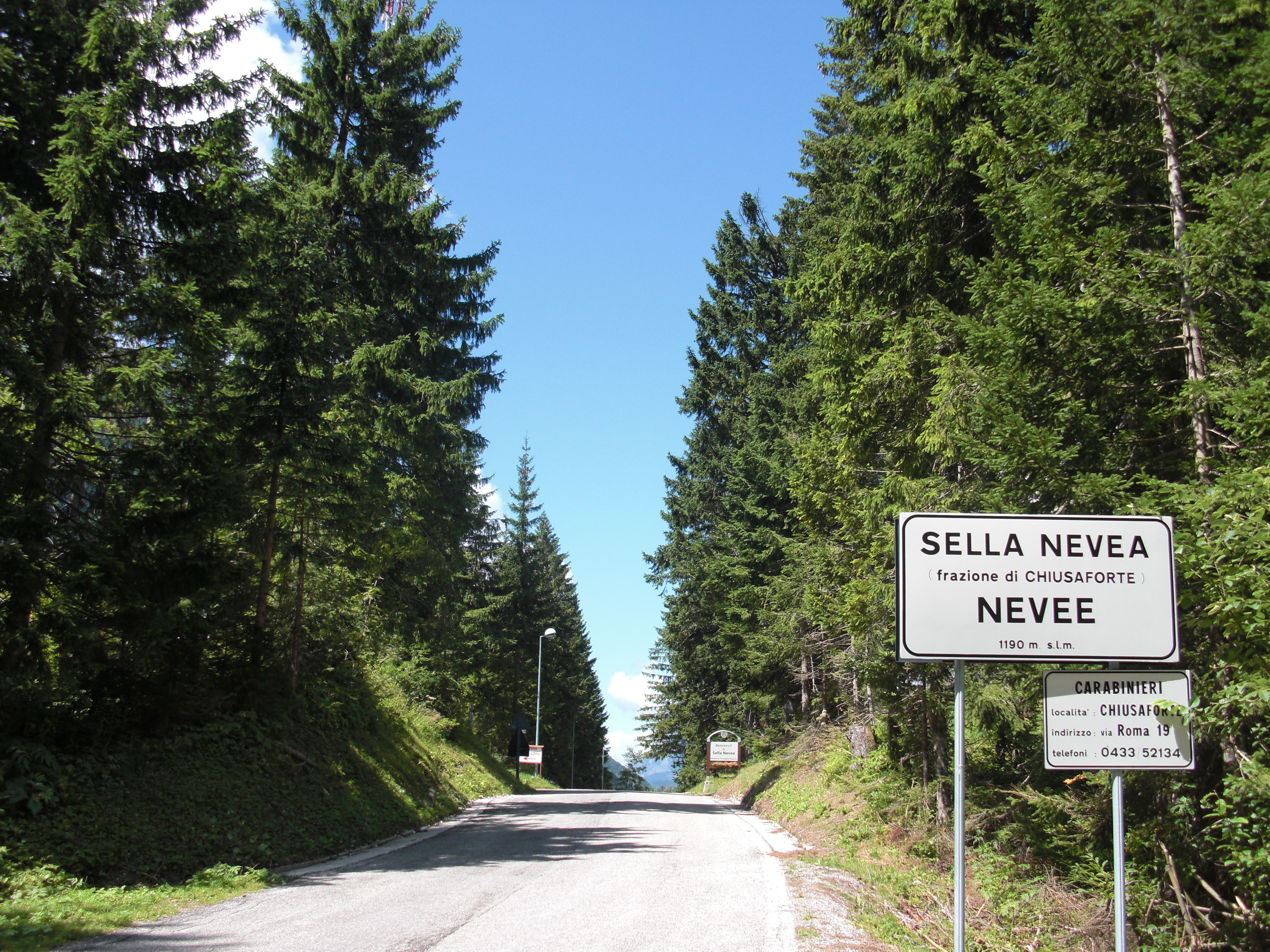
- Pass road

- Location within Alps
- Elevation: 1,195 metres (3,921 ft)

Third Approach
- Location: Friuli-Venezia Giulia, Italy
- Range: Julian Alps
- Coordinates: 46°23′26″N 13°28′32″E

Sella Nevea (Friulian: Nevee, German: Neveasattel, Slovene: Na Žlebeh), at an altitude of 1,195 m (3,921 ft), is a high mountain pass in the Julian Alps, in the Friuli-Venezia Giulia region of northeast Italy. Sella Nevea also lends its name to a frazione of the Chiusaforte municipality and the nearby Kanin-Sella Nevea Ski Resort.

== Geography ==
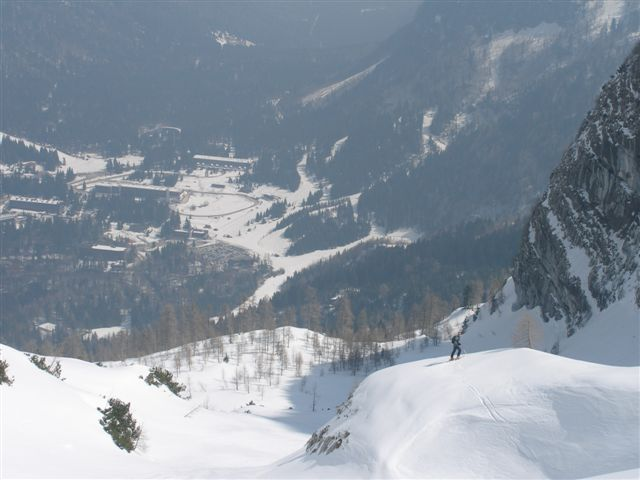
View from Mt. Kanin

The mountain pass is located between the Montasio massif in the north and Mt. Kanin in the south, in the Province of Udine near the border with Slovenia. The pass road connects Chiusaforte via the steep Raccolana valley in the southwest with Cave del Predil and Tarvisio in the north.

Sella Nevea is part of a European Watershed dividing the basin of the Tagliamento river, running southwards to the Adriatic Sea, from the Slizza creek, which originates at Sella Nevea, in the north, which is part of the Danube catchment area. About 10 km (6 mi) north of the pass is the picturesque Lago del Predil, a popular destination for canoeing, wind-surfing, and other water sports.

Sella Nevea offers facilities and equipment for winter sports, such as alpine skiing, cross-country skiing snowboarding, and ice skating. In the summer, the location is used as a base for mountain trekking and rock climbing.

== History ==
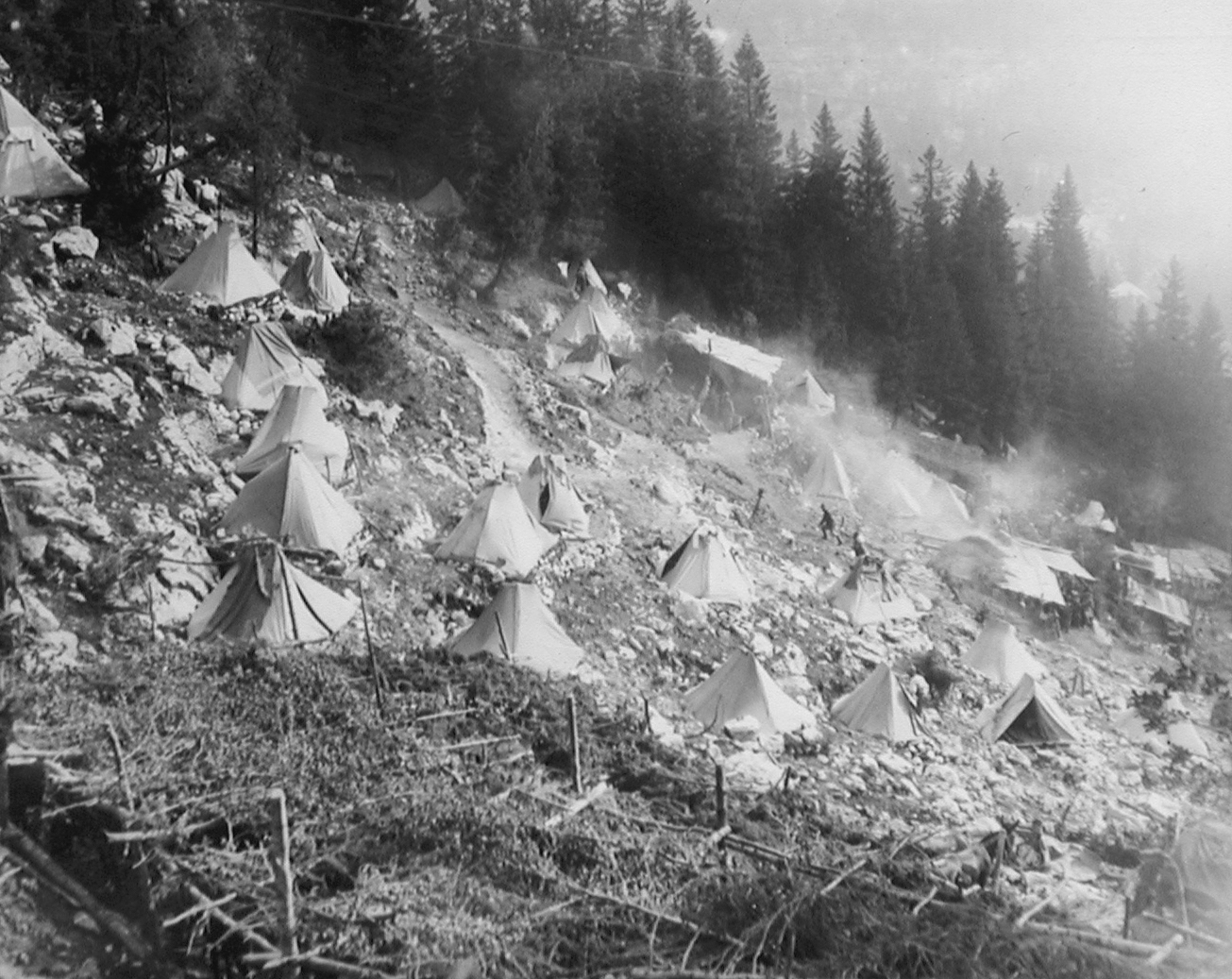
World War 1: 1st Alpini Regiment camped below the Sella Nevea pass

For centuries, the Sella Nevea mountain pass marked the border between the Domini di Terraferma territories of the Republic of Venice and the Imperial Duchy of Carinthia in the north. Incorporated into the Austrian Kingdom of Lombardy–Venetia from 1815, the former Venetian territory in the south finally became part of the newly established Kingdom of Italy upon the Third Italian War of Independence in 1866. The remote border region remained an agricultural area. In the late 19th century, the mountaineer Julius Kugy (1858–1944) described it as a "forest paradise".

In World War I, however, the Italian Front ran along Sella Nevea, while the bloody Battles of the Isonzo raged nearby. When in late 1917 Austro-Hungarian forces were able to break into the Italian front line during the Battle of Caporetto, they also rolled over the top of the pass, nevertheless, they again moved out of the area after the Austrian defeat at the Battle of Vittorio Veneto one year later. By the 1919 Treaty of Saint-Germain, the area of Cave del Predil (Raibl) and Tarvisio (Tarvis) north of the pass also fell to Italy.

== Ski resort ==
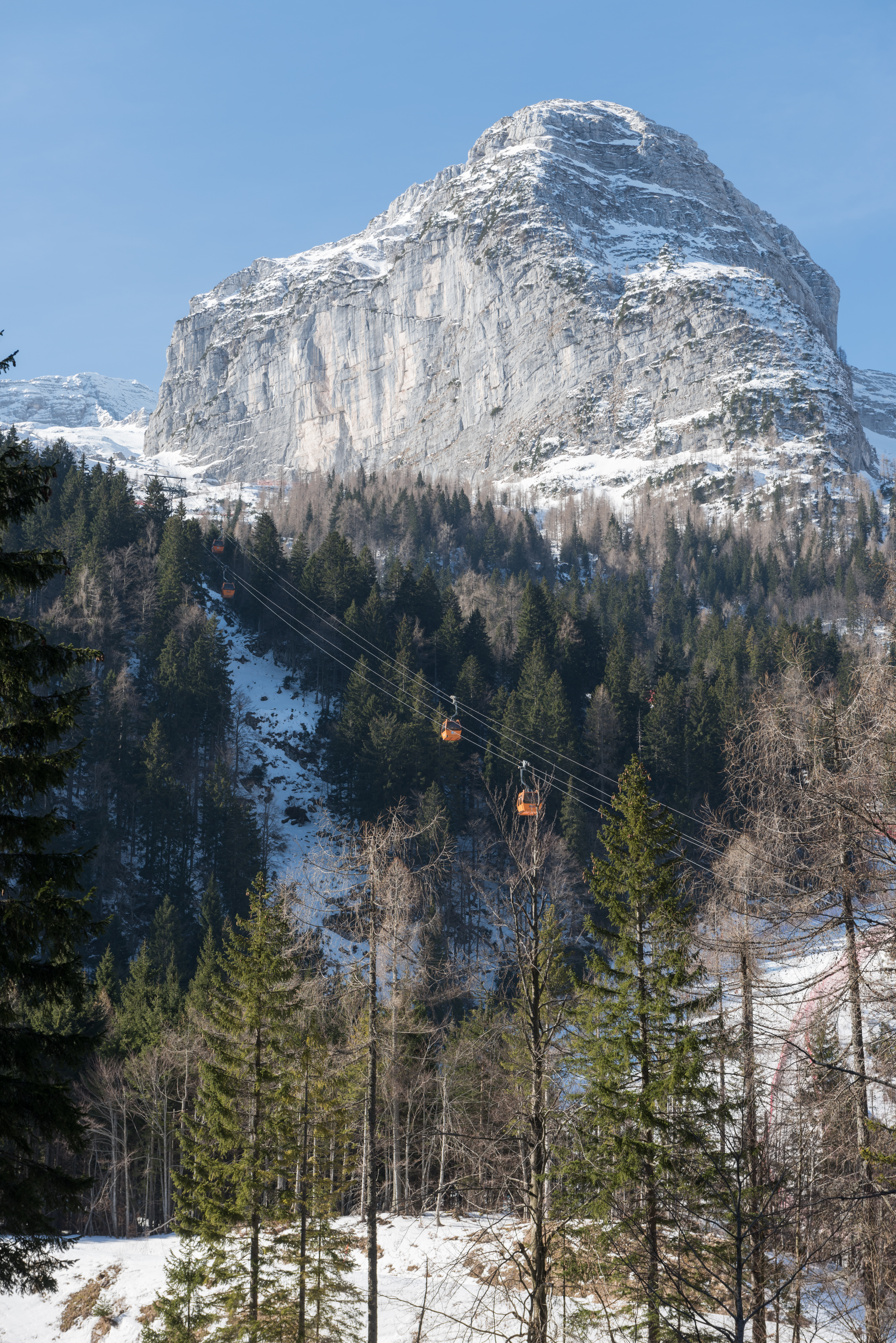
Mt Kanin with cableway

The beginning of the ski area date back to the 1930s, while the present-day Sella Nevea ski resort and hotel village started about 1965, when by resolution of the Chiusaforte municipal council plans for the first ski runs were developed. Considered as "snow-reliable", the area was projected to be a heaven for winter sports, including cable transport to the Celso Gilberti mountain hut at Mt. Kanin, several surface lifts and a hotel complex. However, Sella Nevea's development suffered a serious setback after a series of avalanches struck it in March 1975. In 1980, the company that managed the ski runs went bankrupt.

In the 1990s, Sella Nevea's ski runs fell under the control of Promotur, a state-owned but independent company, which took charge of all five main regional ski resorts. The Sella Nevea resort suffered from neglect that caused it to lose popularity. Promotur said repeatedly that despite the potential of the location, nothing further have been done to arrest its decline. In 2001, preventive measures against avalanches were finally completed. While Sella Nevea was excluded from the 2003 Winter Universiade in Tarvisio, the location grew in popularity as a ski racing training camp. It acquired a reputation for uncrowded slopes.

=== Connection to Bovec ===
In 2005, it was announced that Sella Nevea will receive substantial funds to replace outdated ski equipment, and that a cableway will be built that will connect it to the neighbouring Goriška municipality of Bovec, one of the largest winter ski resorts in Slovenia. The cross-border link of the two resorts was completed in December 2009. It is now possible to ski at both resorts. Because both Italy and Slovenia are members of the European Schengen zone, skiers are able to cross the border between Italy and Slovenia freely, effectively merging the Sella Nevea and Bovec ski resorts into one large ski resort covering both sides of the Kanin mountain.

== See also ==
- List of highest paved roads in Europe
- List of mountain passes
- Passo di Predil a pass just to the east, that leads into Slovenia.
