= Lake Predil =

Lake in Italy

- Lago del Predil (Italian); Lât di Rabil (Friulian); Rabeljsko jezero (Slovene)
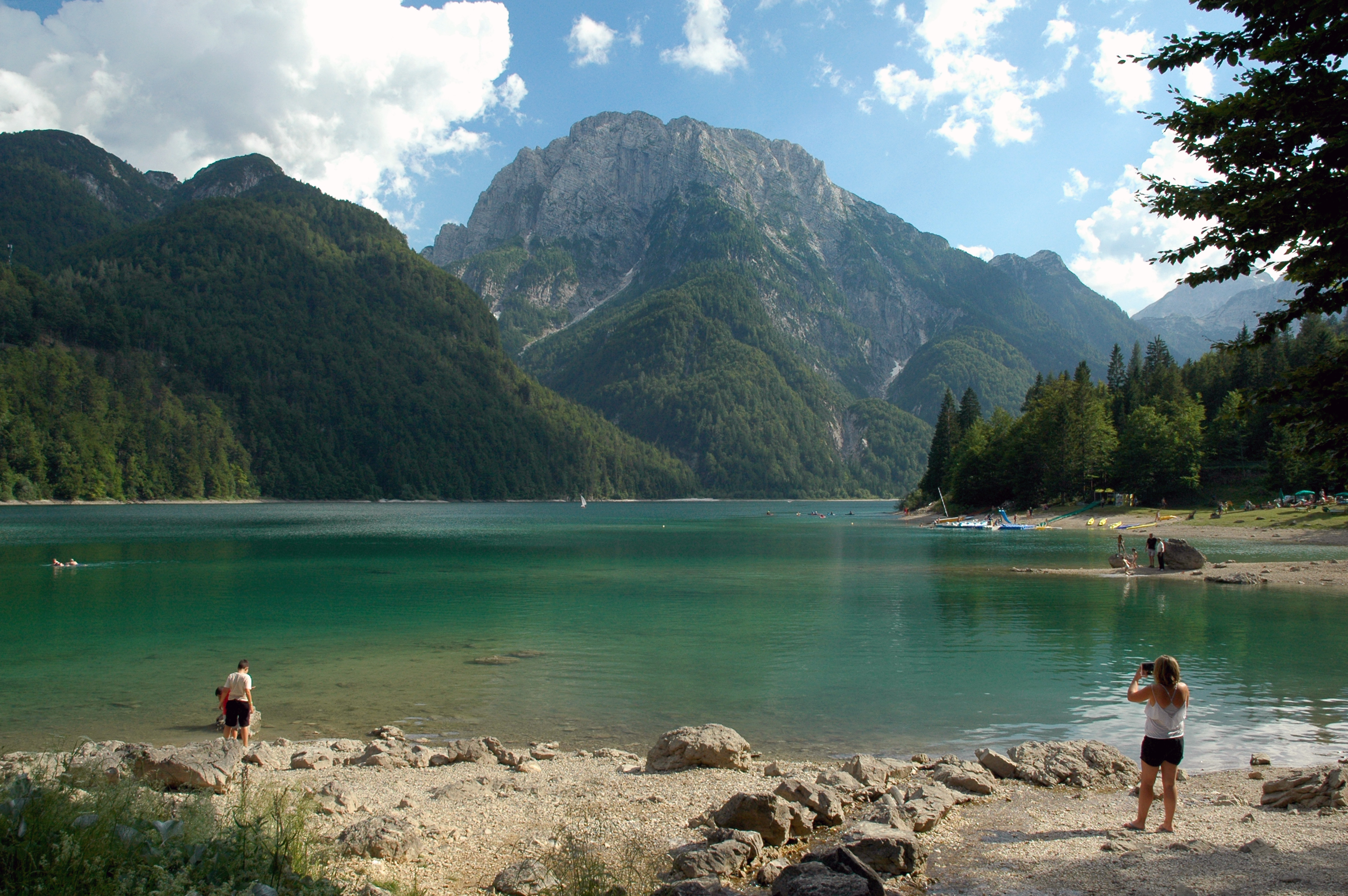
- Lago del Predil in summer

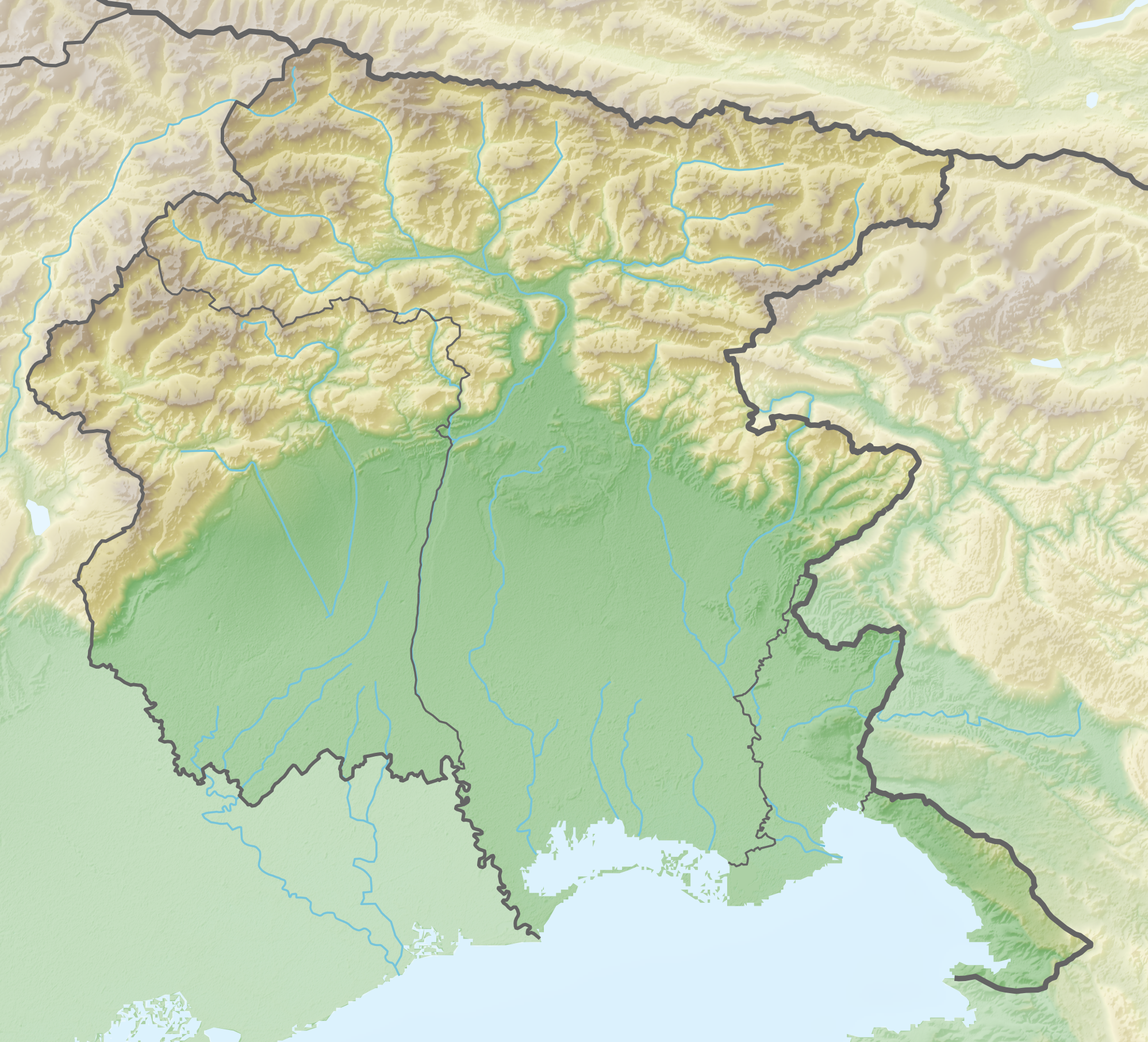
- Location within Friuli-Venezia Giulia
- Location: Province of Udine, Friuli-Venezia Giulia
- Coordinates: 46°25′N 13°34′E
- Primary inflows: Rio di Saletto
- Primary outflows: Rio del Lago
- Basin countries: Italy
- Surface area: 1 km^{2} (0.39 sq mi)
- Surface elevation: 969 m (3,179 ft)

Lake Predil (Italian: Lago del Predil, Friulian: Lât di Rabil, German: Raibler See, Slovene: Rabeljsko jezero) is a lake near Cave del Predil, part of the Tarvisio municipality in the Province of Udine, in the Italian region of Friuli-Venezia Giulia.

== Geography ==
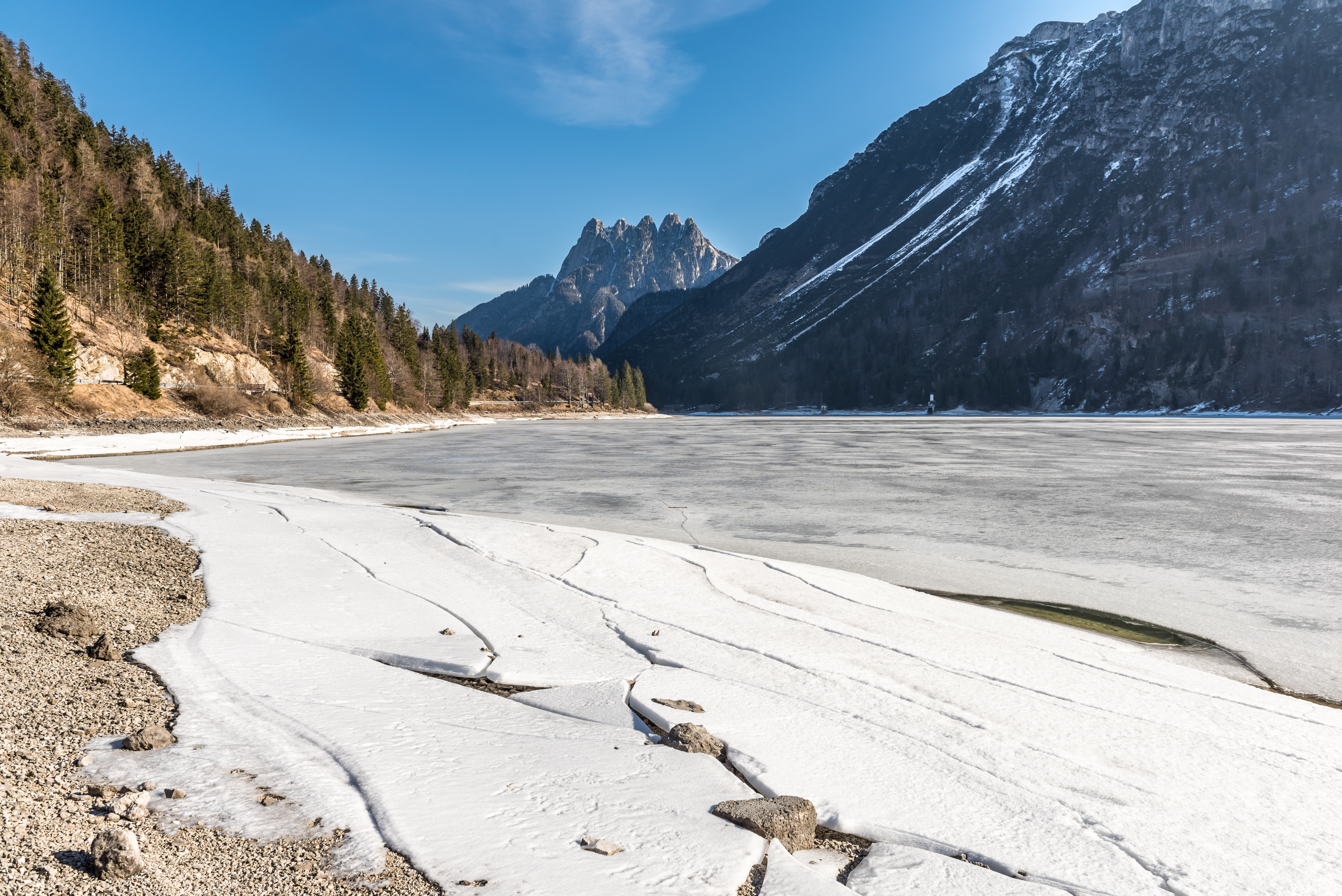
Cinque Punte (1909 m) in the background in winter

The lake is located at an elevation of 969 m (3,179 ft), situated in a high valley of the Julian Alps north of the Sella Nevea. In the east, the Predil Pass road leads up to the Slovenian border. With a surface area of about 1 km^{2} (0.39 sq mi), it is the second largest natural lake of the Friuli-Venezia Giulia region, after Lago di Cavazzo.

Due to its picturesque setting beneath the Kanin massif, the lake is a popular tourist destination for hikers and day trippers.

== History ==
For centuries, the southern border of the Imperial Duchy of Carinthia with the Venetian Domini di Terraferma ran along the nearby mountain crests of Predil Pass and Sella Nevea. After the loss of the Venetian territory to the Kingdom of Italy in 1866, the Austro-Hungarian Army from 1885 to 1887 had a fortress erected on the lakeside, to protect the road down to Tarvisio.

In World War I, the fort was badly damaged during the Battles of the Isonzo on the Italian Front. Some ruins are preserved and accessible to the public.
