= Cave del Predil =

- Frazione
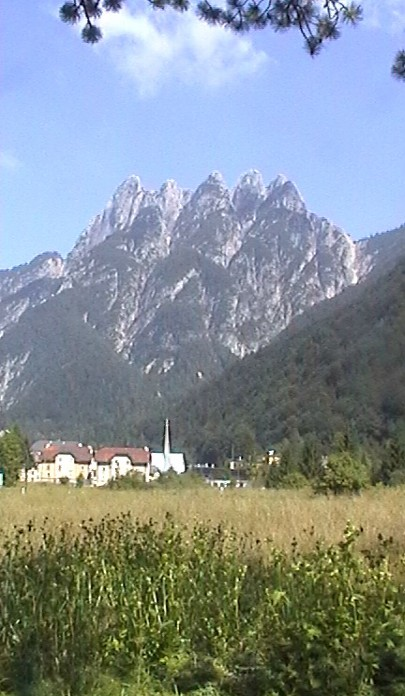
- Cave del Predil and Cinque Punte massif

- Location of Cave del Predil in Italy
- Coordinates: 46°26′33″N 13°34′17″E
- Country: Italy
- Region: Friuli-Venezia Giulia
- Province: Province of Udine (UD)
- Comune: Tarvisio

Population (2002)
  - Total: 400
- Time zone: UTC+1 (CET)
  - Summer (DST): UTC+2 (CEST)
- Dialing code: 0428

Cave del Predil (German: Raibl, Slovene: Rabelj) is a frazione subdivision of the comune of Tarvisio in the Province of Udine, in the Friuli-Venezia Giulia region of northeastern Italy.

== Geography ==
The hamlet is located about 15 km (9 mi) south of the Tarvis town centre, in the valley of the Rio del Lago (Seebachtal) between the Montasio and Mangart massifs of the Julian Alps. The parallel road runs further up to the picturesque Lago del Predil and the Sella Nevea mountain pass. An eastern branch-off leads to Predil Pass at the border with Slovenia. A 4,844 m (15,892 ft) long tunnel under the pass, built in 1905 and originally used for water drainage and later for transport of miners and political refugees escaping from communist Yugoslavia, connects it with Log pod Mangartom.

== History ==
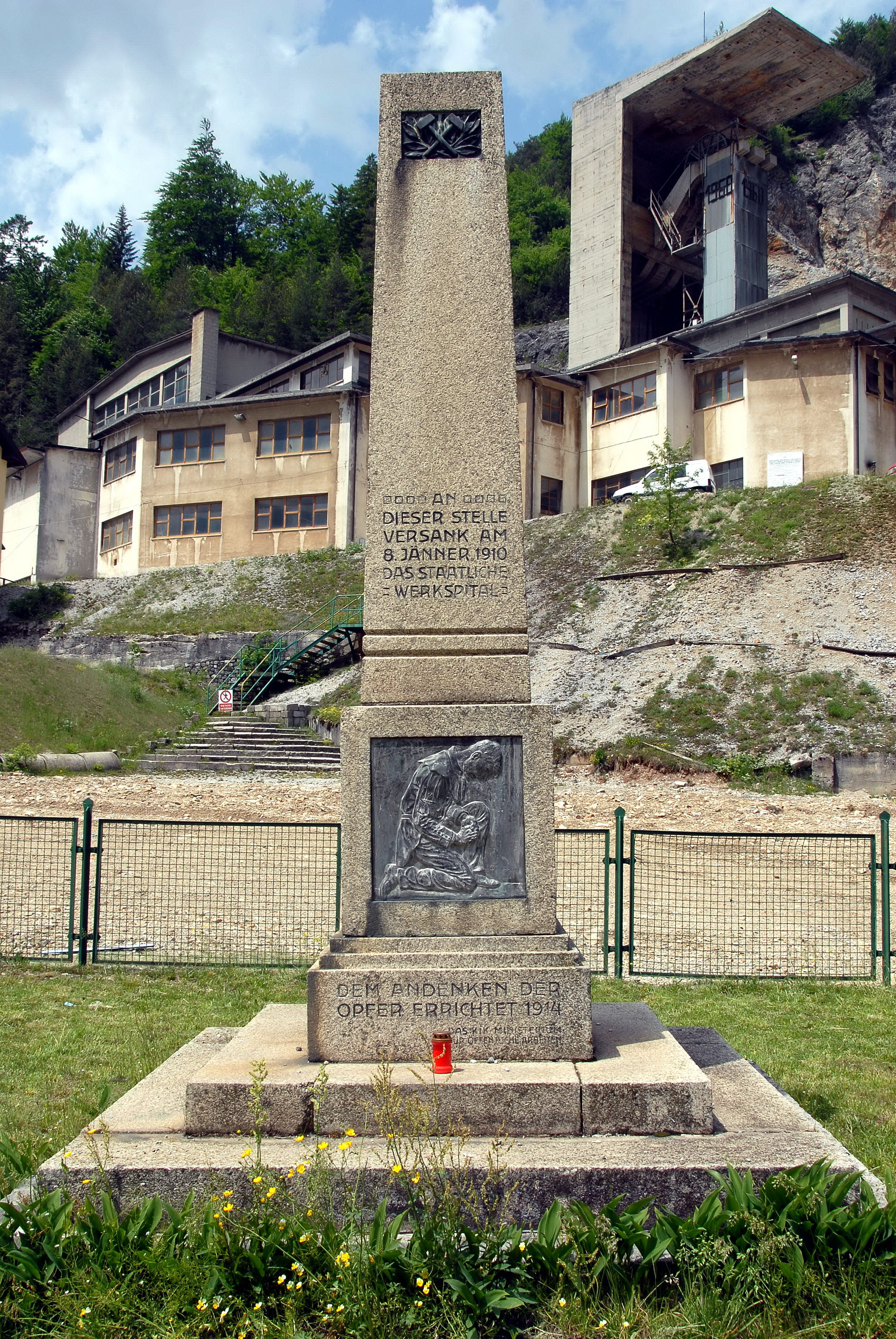
Monument to the hospital that collapsed on January 8, 1910

The lead and zinc mining community was first mentioned in a 1320 deed issued by the Habsburg duke Frederick the Fair, at the time when the surrounding estates belonged to the Carinthian possessions held by the Prince-Bishopric of Bamberg. The bishops also gained control over the trade route across the Nevea mountain pass leading to the city of Cividale del Friuli, the importance of which however diminished, after the Friulian lands in the south had been conquered by the Republic of Venice by 1420. Bamberg finally sold its remote Carinthian estates to Empress Maria Theresa in 1759, who incorporated it into the Austrian Habsburg monarchy.

By the late nineteenth century, mining activity was not limited to the nearby mountain, but extended deep below the village. On the January 8, 1910, a wall of rock in the mine collapsed, and the galleries were flooded with large quantities of gravel and water from Lake Predil and its river. A number of the galleries collapsed, and around 1 pm the hospital sank 150 m into the earth. Seven people died, commemorated with a monument in 1914.

With the Duchy of Carinthia, Cave del Predil until World War I was part of Austria-Hungary, and by the 1919 Treaty of Saint-Germain came under control of the Kingdom of Italy. A local museum covers the military history of the Alpine campaigns from the Napoleonic Wars to World War II. Under Italian control the mines, temporarily managed by Bernardino Nogara, operated until 1991; since then, the population has sharply decreased.

== Gallery ==
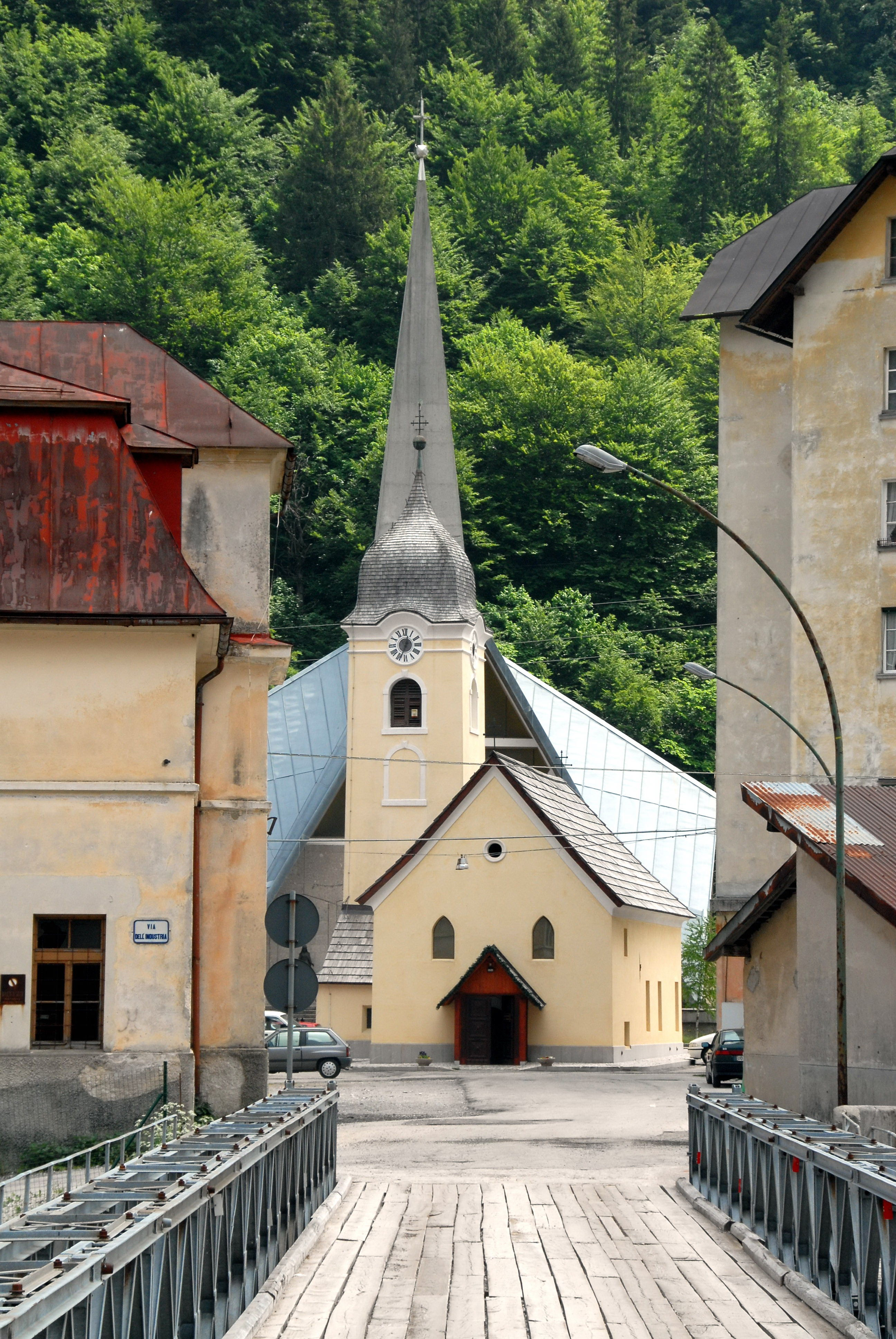
Saint Anne's Church

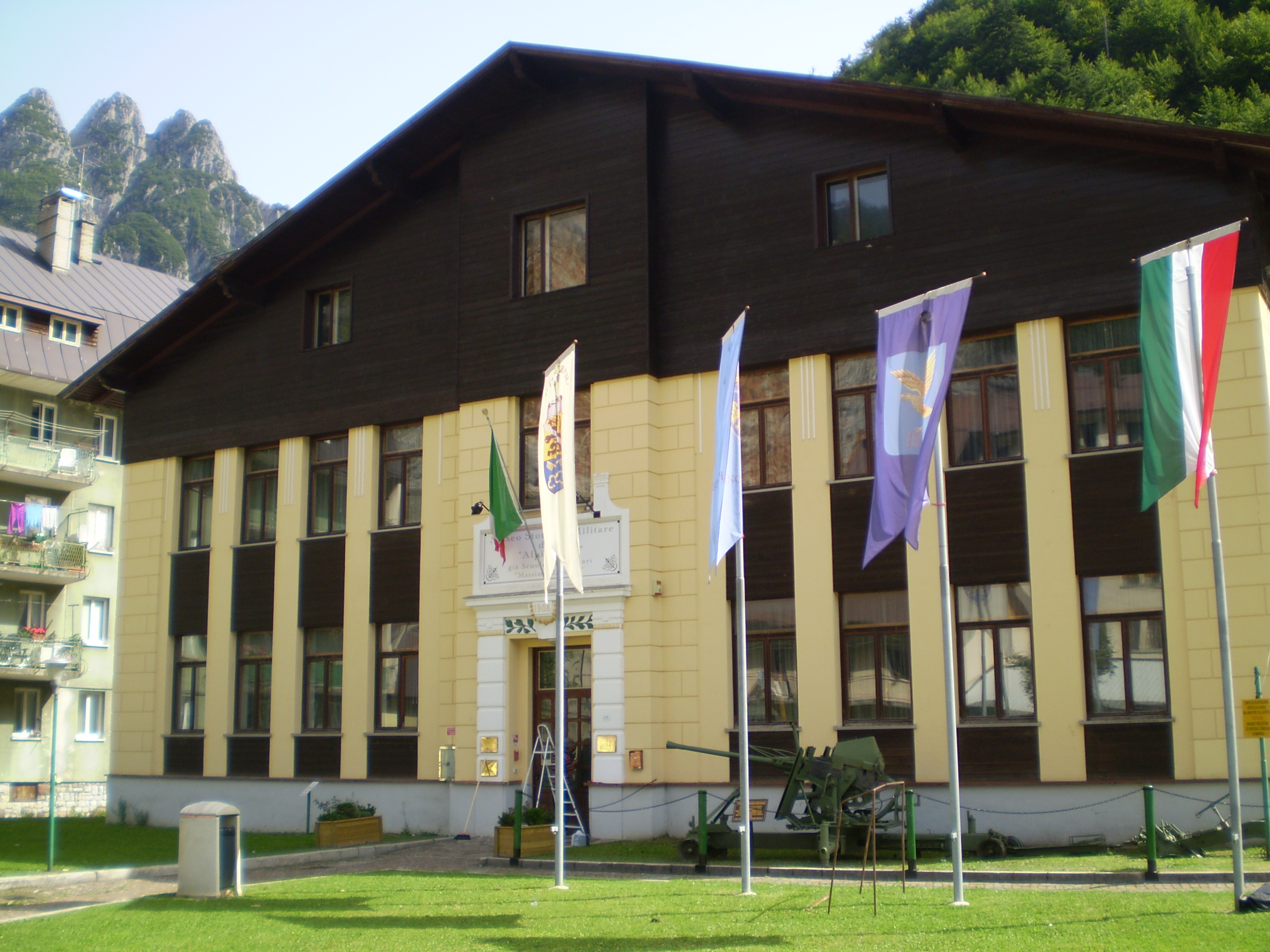
Military museum

== See also ==
- Raibl Formation
