= Tarvisio =

Tarvisio Tarvis (German) Tarvis (Friulian) Trbiž (Slovene)
- Comune
- Città di Tarvisio
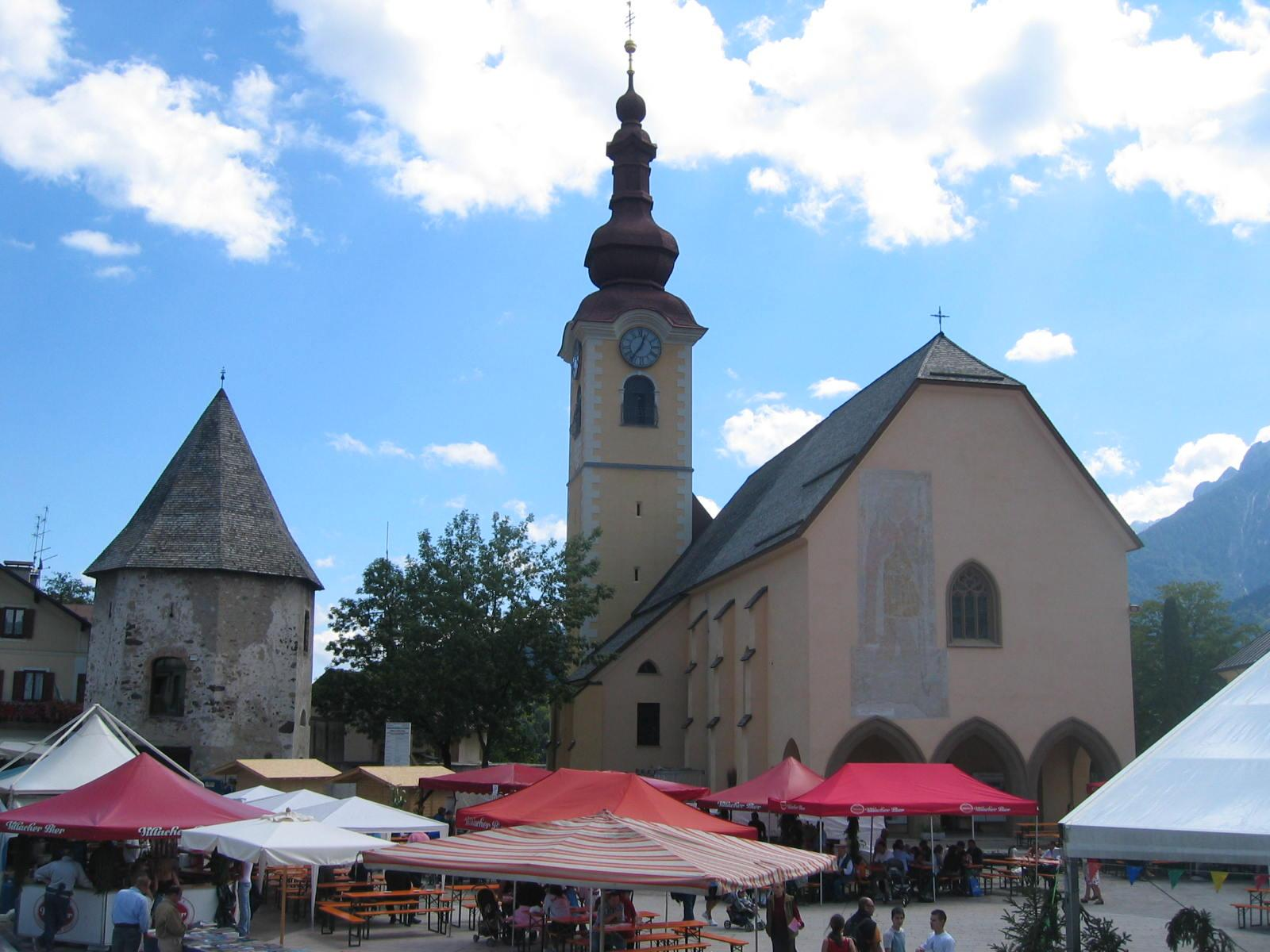
- Main square with Sts. Peter and Paul Church

- Coat of arms

- Location within Italy Location within Friuli-Venezia Giulia
- Coordinates: 46°30′18″N 13°34′42″E
- Country: Italy
- Region: Friuli-Venezia Giulia
- Province: Udine (UD)
- Frazioni: Tarvisio Centrale, Camporosso in Valcanale, Cave del Predil, Coccau, Fusine in Valromana, Monte Lussari, Muda, Plezzut, Poscolle, Rutte, Sant'Antonio

Government
  - Mayor: Renzo Zanette

Area
  - Total: 205 km^{2} (79 sq mi)
- Elevation: 754 m (2,474 ft)

Population (30 June 2025)
  - Total: 3,878
  - Density: 18.9/km^{2} (49.0/sq mi)
- Demonym: Tarvisiani
- Time zone: UTC+1 (CET)
  - Summer (DST): UTC+2 (CEST)
- Postal code: 33018
- Dialing code: 0428
- ISTAT code: 030117
- Patron saint: Saint Peter and Saint Paul
- Saint day: June 29
- Website: Official website

Tarvisio (German and Friulian: Tarvis; Slovene: Trbiž) is a comune (municipality) in the Regional Decentralization Entity of Udine, in the autonomous Friuli-Venezia Giulia region of Italy.

The comune of Tarvisio includes the following frazioni (fractional parishes):

Names in: Italian (German, Slovene, Friulian):

- Camporosso (Saifnitz, Žabnice, Cjamparos)
- Cave del Predil (Raibl, Rabelj, Rabil/Predil)
- Coccau (Goggau, Kokova, Cocau)
- Fusine in Valromana (Weißenfels/Weissenfels, Fužine/Bela Peč, Fusinis)
- Monte Lussari (Luschariberg, Svete Višarje, Mont Sante di Lussari)
- Muda (Mauth, Muta, Mude)
- Plezzut (Flitschl, Flíčl, Pleçùt)
- Poscolle (Hinterschloss, Zágradec, Puscuèl)
- Rutte (Greuth, Trbiške rute, Rute)
- Sant'Antonio (Sankt Anton, Sveti Anton, Sant Antòni)
- Riofreddo (Kaltwasser, Mrzla Voda)

Neighboring towns are: Chiusaforte and Malborghetto Valbruna in Italy, Arnoldstein and Hohenthurn in Austria, Kranjska Gora and Bovec in Slovenia.

== Geography ==
The town is in the Canal Valley (Val Canale) between the Carnic Alps and Karawanks ranges in the north and the Julian Alps in the south. Located at the border with both Austria and Slovenia, Tarvisio and its neighbouring municipalities of Arnoldstein and Kranjska Gora form the tripoint of Romance, Germanic and Slavic Europe. The height west of the town centre marks the watershed between the Slizza creek, a tributary of the Gail River which is part of the Danube basin and the Fella River, a tributary of the Tagliamento discharging into the Adriatic Sea. Tarvisio together with the rest of the Canal Valley was part of Austria until 1919.

Tarvisio has access to the A23 Alpe-Adria autostrada, part of the European route E55, running from the Austrian A2 Süd Autobahn to Udine, and the A4 autostrada at Palmanova. The Tarvisio railway station is located at the new Pontebbana line from Villach to Udine opened in 2000, that replaced the tracks of the former Austro-Hungarian k.k. Staatsbahn built in 1879.

== History ==
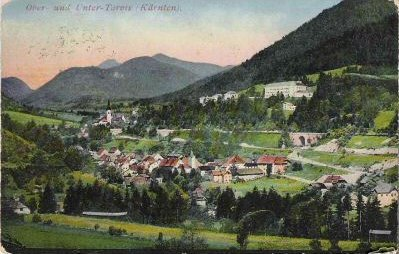
View of Tarvisio in 1915

As a place upon ancient trade routes across the Alps to Venice, Tarvisio's roots date back to Roman times. In 1007 Emperor Henry II vested the newly created Diocese of Bamberg with the Carinthian Canal Valley down to Pontebba, a region which had considerable importance because of nearby ore mines and ironworks, especially around the village of Fusine in Valromana (Weißenfels/Bela Peč/Fusinis). Tarvisio remained a southern exclave of the Prince-Bishopric of Bamberg, until in 1758 the bishop finally sold Tarvisio to the Habsburg Empress Maria Theresa of Austria. Until 1918 it was part of the Duchy of Carinthia, it received town privileges in 1909.

It became part of the Kingdom of Italy in 1919, after the First World War, and since then has enjoyed considerable growth as a border town, located on the Venice-Vienna route and near the important border crossings of Valico di Coccau, Valico di Fusine, and Passo del Predil. Beginning in the 1920s, the municipality of Tarvisio has received significant migratory flows from Friuli and the rest of Italy, which radically changed its ethnic composition.

In 1939, Tarvisio and the other municipalities of the Canale Valley were affected by the South Tyrol Options between Italy and Germany. A large number of citizens, not only German-speaking but also Slovenian-speaking, opted for German citizenship and moved to Carinthia. At the end of the war, the number of returns was much lower than that experienced in South Tyrol.

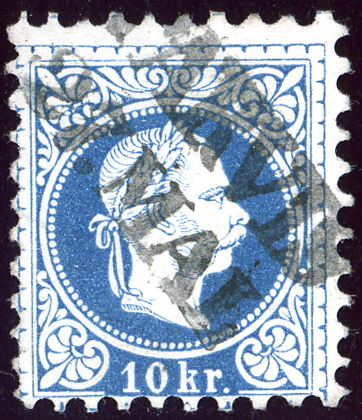
TARVIS in the Duchy of Carinthia (Austria-Hungary) in 1874 stamp

== Symbols ==
The municipality adopted its own historical coat of arms, recognized by decree of the Head of Government of January 8, 1935, which is emblazoned within the municipal statute.

"A semi-circular shield divided in the first or, a two-tailed lion sable, tongued gules, a band argent crossing; in the second azure, two keys crossed or. Stamped with the colorless wall crown." (Municipal Statute, art. 2, paragraph 3)

The banner, recognized by royal decree of December 10, 1942, is a flag divided in yellow and blue.

=== Climate ===
Despite being located only 754 m above sea level, it has an alpine climate with cold winters (absolute minimum temperature −23 °C or −9 °F in January 1985)) and very snowy winters (due to high precipitation, an annual average of 250 cm of snowfall). On the other hand, summers are quite hot (absolute maximum temperature 37 °C or 99 °F in July 1983). The Tarvisio weather station, officially recognized by the World Meteorological Organization, is located within the municipality and serves as a reference point for studying the climate of the corresponding Alpine region.

Climate data for Tarvisio (1991–2020, extremes 1953–present)
Month	Jan	Feb	Mar	Apr	May	Jun	Jul	Aug	Sep	Oct	Nov	Dec	Year
Record high °C (°F)	13.6 (56.5)	18.4 (65.1)	22.7 (72.9)	25.8 (78.4)	30.2 (86.4)	34.0 (93.2)	37.2 (99.0)	35.2 (95.4)	29.8 (85.6)	25.2 (77.4)	21.0 (69.8)	14.4 (57.9)	37.2 (99.0)
Mean daily maximum °C (°F)	2.4 (36.3)	4.5 (40.1)	9.1 (48.4)	13.6 (56.5)	18.4 (65.1)	22.4 (72.3)	24.5 (76.1)	24.2 (75.6)	19.2 (66.6)	13.7 (56.7)	7.1 (44.8)	2.4 (36.3)	13.5 (56.3)
Daily mean °C (°F)	−1.0 (30.2)	0.4 (32.7)	4.2 (39.6)	8.3 (46.9)	12.9 (55.2)	16.7 (62.1)	18.3 (64.9)	18.3 (64.9)	13.9 (57.0)	9.4 (48.9)	4.1 (39.4)	−0.6 (30.9)	8.7 (47.7)
Mean daily minimum °C (°F)	−4.3 (24.3)	−3.7 (25.3)	−0.5 (31.1)	3.1 (37.6)	7.4 (45.3)	10.9 (51.6)	12.3 (54.1)	12.4 (54.3)	8.7 (47.7)	5.1 (41.2)	1.2 (34.2)	−3.6 (25.5)	4.1 (39.4)
Record low °C (°F)	−23.2 (−9.8)	−22.4 (−8.3)	−20.5 (−4.9)	−10.8 (12.6)	−6.2 (20.8)	−1.2 (29.8)	2.4 (36.3)	1.8 (35.2)	−2.6 (27.3)	−7.1 (19.2)	−15.4 (4.3)	−18.9 (−2.0)	−23.2 (−9.8)
Average precipitation mm (inches)	53.7 (2.11)	61.5 (2.42)	68.8 (2.71)	89.5 (3.52)	110.3 (4.34)	120.7 (4.75)	137.3 (5.41)	145.7 (5.74)	144.0 (5.67)	153.8 (6.06)	143.7 (5.66)	87.8 (3.46)	1,316.7 (51.84)
Average precipitation days (≥ 1.0 mm)	4.5	5.4	5.9	8.8	11.2	10.8	10.3	11.0	9.0	8.4	8.7	6.6	100.5
Average relative humidity (%)	81.3	76.2	72.8	72.3	72.7	73.2	73.1	74.6	77.4	80.4	83.9	84.2	76.8
Average dew point °C (°F)	−3.5 (25.7)	−3.3 (26.1)	−0.5 (31.1)	3.1 (37.6)	7.9 (46.2)	12.0 (53.6)	13.6 (56.5)	14.1 (57.4)	10.6 (51.1)	6.7 (44.1)	1.9 (35.4)	−2.4 (27.7)	5.0 (41.0)
Source 1: NOAA
Source 2: Servizio Meteorologico

== Languages ==
As a former component of the Austrian Empire, until 1918, the town, as was the rest of the Canal Valley, was overwhelmingly German- and Slovenian-speaking. Today the municipality speaks mostly Italian; German-speakers and Slovenes make up a small minority. In 1983 the town registered 84% Italian-speakers, 9% German-speakers and 7% Slovene-speakers. In 2012, the mayor put up multilingual signs in four languages, Italian, German, Slovene, and the regional minority language of Friulian, saying "the inhabitants deserve to use their mother tongues freely."

== Monuments and places of interest ==
=== Religious Architecture ===
- Parish Church of Saints Peter and Paul, built in the 14th century and completed in the 15th century, was expanded between 1959 and 1962.
- Sanctuary Holy Mount of Lussari: at the summit of the 1,789-metre (5,869 ft) Mount Lussari (Italian: Monte Lussari, German: Luschariberg, Slovene: Svete Višarje) is a pilgrimage church, where according to legend in 1360 a shepherd discovered a statue of Virgin Mary.
- Church of Sant'Egidio Abate in Camporosso in Valcanale
- Church of the Blessed Virgin of Loreto, a 17th-century building located in Tarviso Bassa
- Church of San Leonardo, parish church of Fusine in Valromana, dating back to the 15th century
- Church of San Nicolò Vescovo, built in Coccau in the Middle Ages
- Church of Sant'Antonio, located in Oltreacqua, dating back to the 16th century
- Church of Saints Filippo and Giacomo in Plezzut, built in the 17th century
- Church of Sant'Anna in Cave del Predil

=== Civil and military buildings ===
- Medieval towers: The octagonal tower, owned by the municipality since 1857, was heavily modified in the late 19th century and the round tower houses the remains of Italian soldiers who died in the Tarvisio area during World War II.
- Monument to the Austrian Grenadier
- Customs Museum and Tarvisio Museums - International Geomineral Park
- Museum of Mining Tradition
- Historical Museum - Antiquarium of Camporosso
- Julian Alps Military History Museum
- Raibl International Geomineral Park with the former mine in the Cave del Predil

== Demographic evolution ==
Historical population

Year	Pop.	±%
1861	?	—
1871	?	—
1881	?	—
1901	?	—
1911	?	—
1921	5,863	—

Year	Pop.	±%
1931	6,724	+14.7%
1936	6,253	−7.0%
1951	6,438	+3.0%
1961	6,845	+6.3%
1971	6,466	−5.5%
1981	5,985	−7.4%

Year	Pop.	±%
1991	5,961	−0.4%
2001	5,071	−14.9%
2011	4,577	−9.7%
2021	3,997	−12.7%

Source: Data from ISTAT

== Foreign ethnicities and minorities ==
As of December 31, 2024 foreigners residents in the municipality were 242, i.e. 6.1% of the population. The largest foreign community comes from Romania, with 14.4% of all foreigners present in the country, followed by Austria and Bosnia-Herzegovina.

== Economy ==
For decades, Tarvisio benefited economically from people coming from Austria and former Yugoslavia for shopping trips. However, trade at the notorious "Rag Market" diminished after the implementation of Schengen Agreement and the establishment of the Eurozone. Today, tourism and winter sports in the Karawanks, the Carnic Alps, and the Julian Alps have become important industries. Tarvisio is known for its heavy alpine snow, which attracts many tourists for skiing and snowboarding, especially school groups. It was host to the 2003 Winter Universiade and the Women's 2007 Alpine Skiing World Cup.

== Infrastructure and transport ==
=== Roads ===
The town of Tarvisio is located in the immediate vicinity of the Alpe-Adria motorway (A23), which is accessible via two junctions: Tarvisio Sud and Tarvisio Nord. Tarvisio is also the junction of two major roads: the Pontebbana and the SS54.

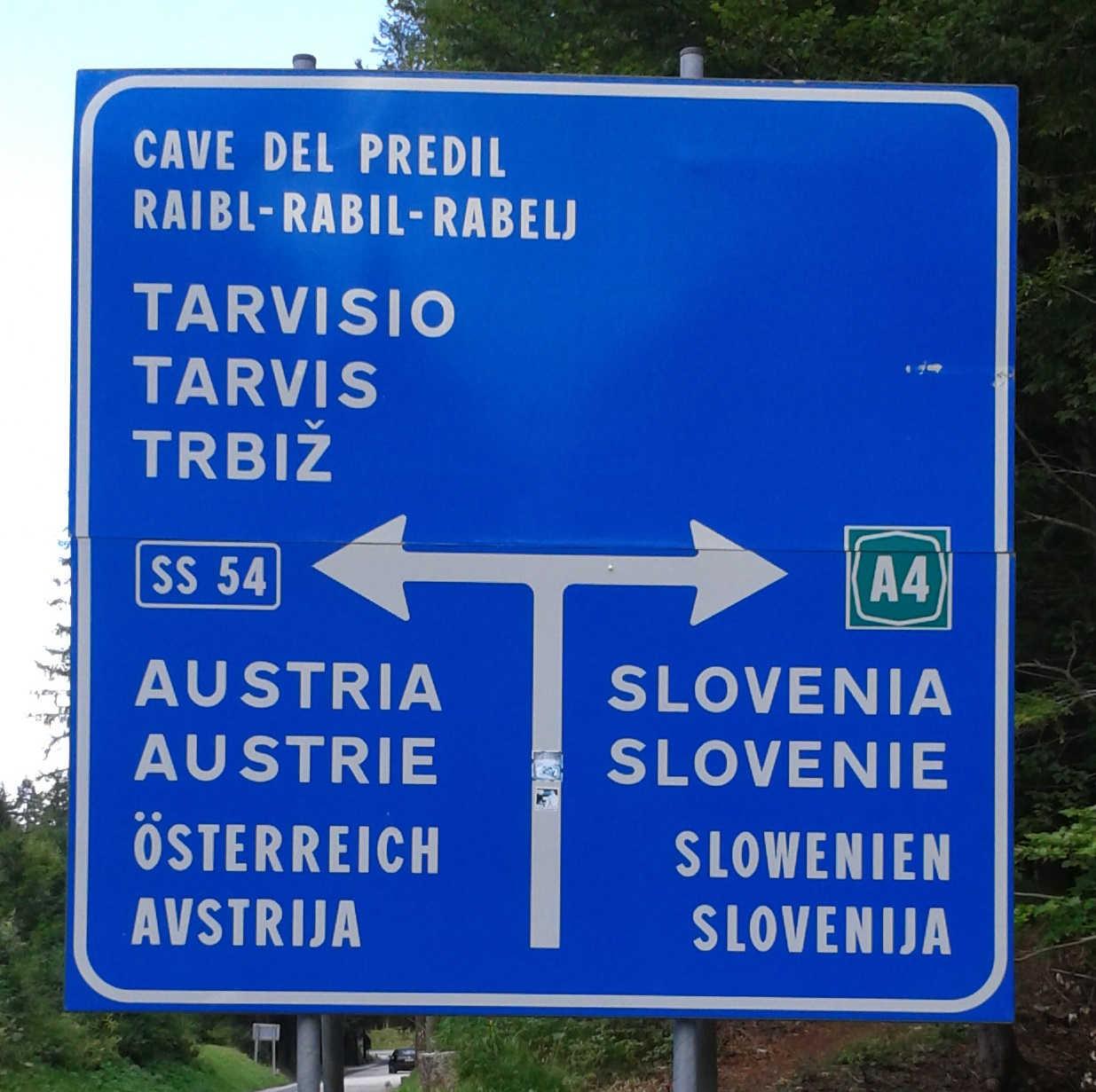
Quadrilingual road signs

=== Railways ===
Tarvisio Boscoverde railway station is located on the Pontebbana line, which runs to Udine and is operated by Rete Ferroviaria Italiana (RFI), and the Rodolfiana line, which runs to Austria and is operated by the Austrian Federal Railways (ÖBB).

Before the opening of the new Pontebbana line in 2000, Tarvisio was served by two railway stations: Tarvisio Centrale station, which served as an international border station, and Tarvisio Città station. Until 1965, the international line to Ljubljana branched off from Tarvisio Centrale, which served the Fusine in Valromana and Fusine Laghi stations.

=== Urban Mobility ===
Urban transport in the municipality is provided by scheduled bus services operated by the SAF company. Some tracks of the former railway station have been replaced by the Alpe Adria Cycle Path.

=== Air transport ===
The nearest airports to the Tarvisio are:

- Klagenfurt Airport, located 71 km (44 mi) north east
- Ljubljana Airport, located 82 km (51 mi) south east
- Trieste Airport, located 132 km (82 mi) south
- Venice Marco Polo Airport, located 209 km (130 mi) south west

== Notable people ==
People who were born or lived in Tarvisio include:

- Lambert Ehrlich (1878–1942), Slovene Roman Catholic priest, political figure, and ethnologist
- Nives Meroi, Italian mountaineer who summit all fourteen eight thousand meter peaks in the world

== Gallery ==
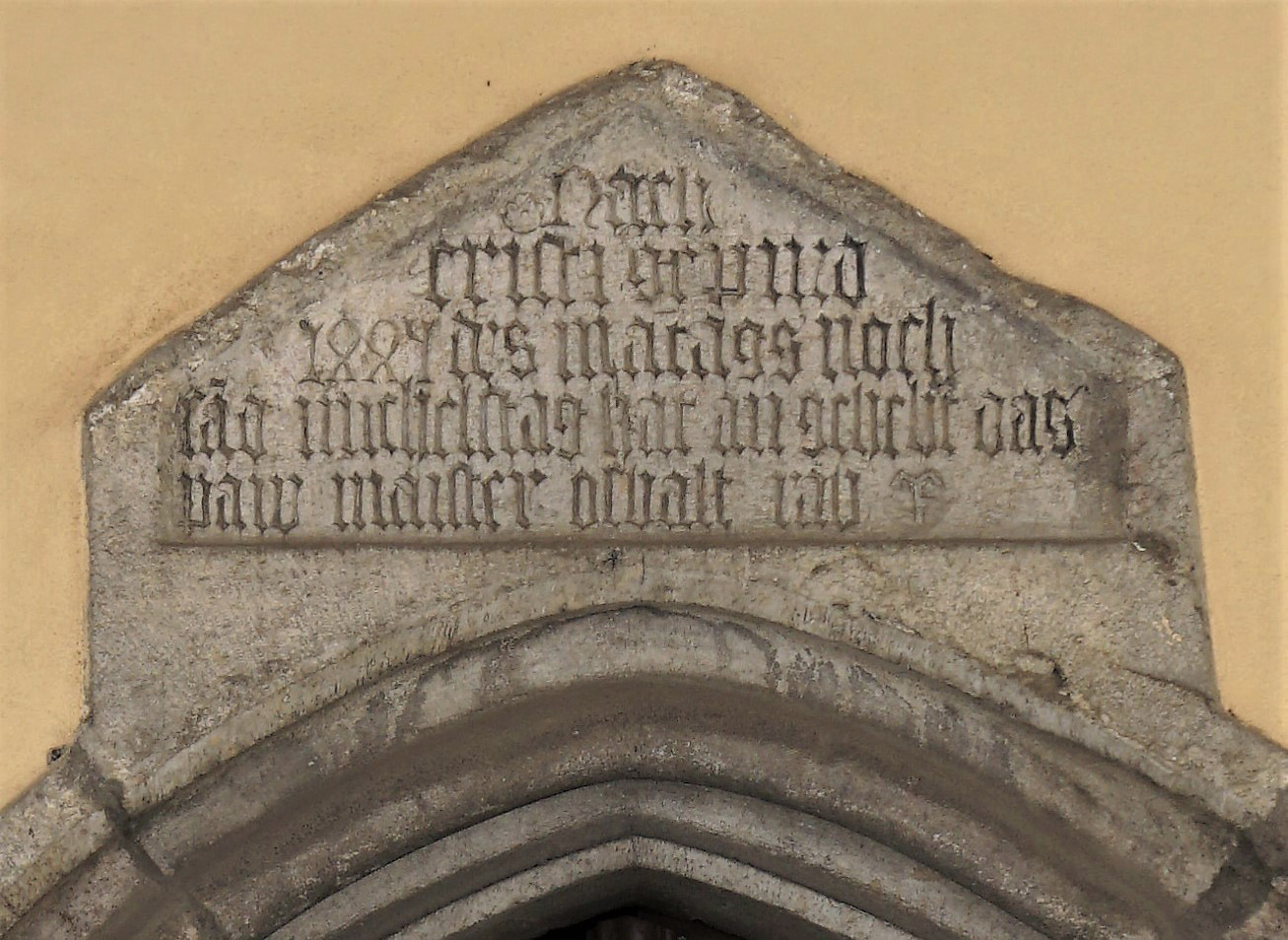
Stone plate with the founding year 1445

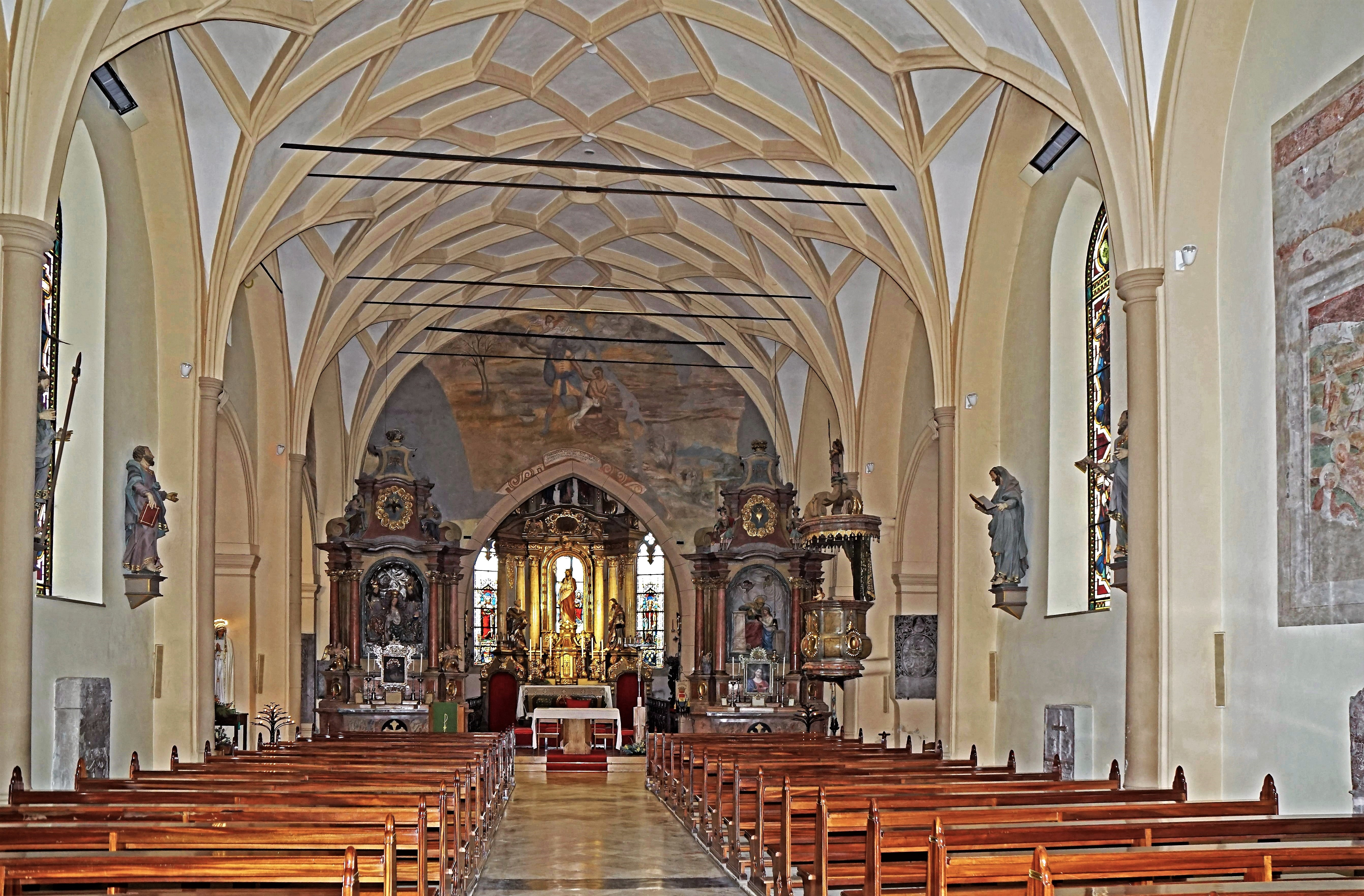
Interior view of the parish church

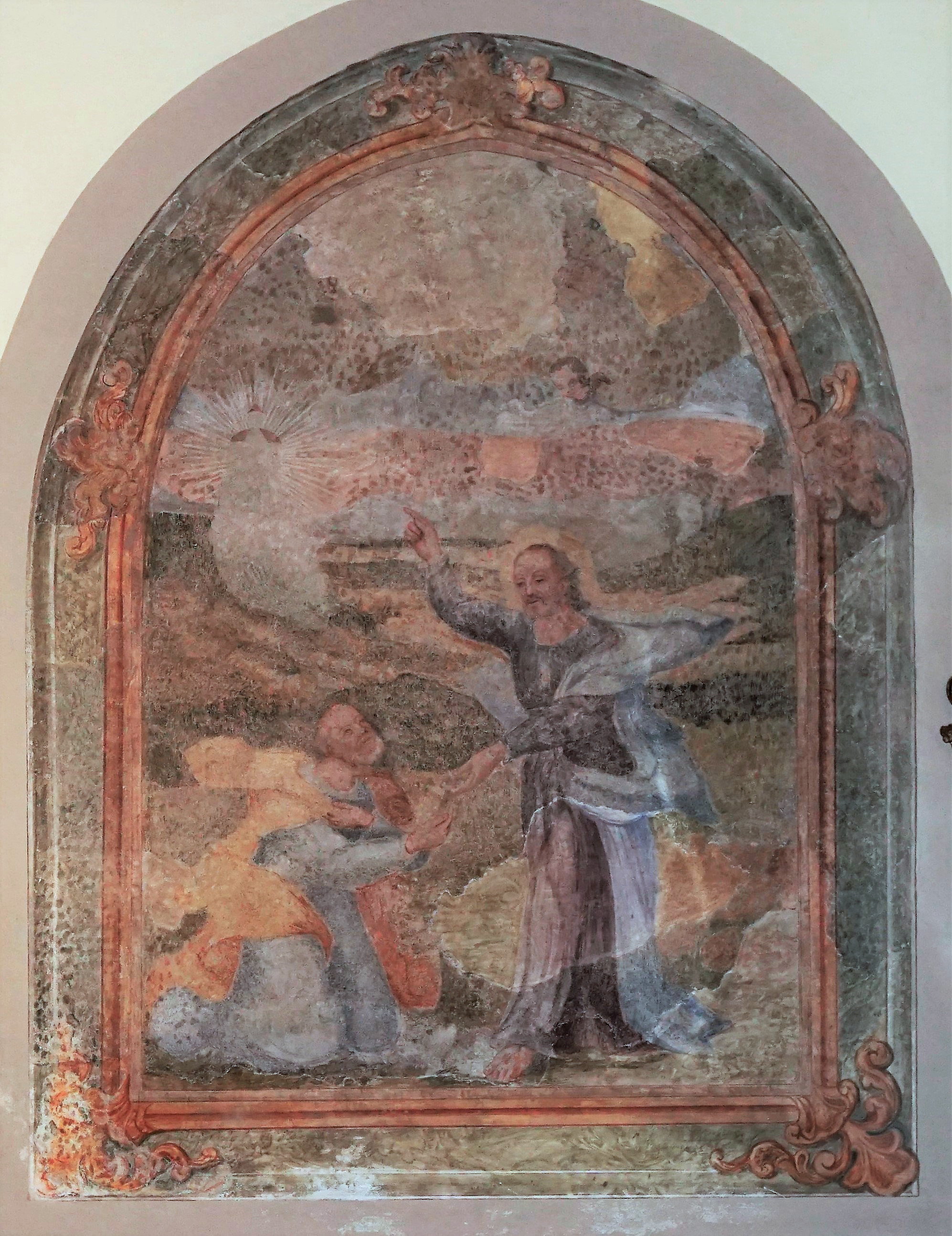
Fresco: Jesus transfers the primacy to Peter

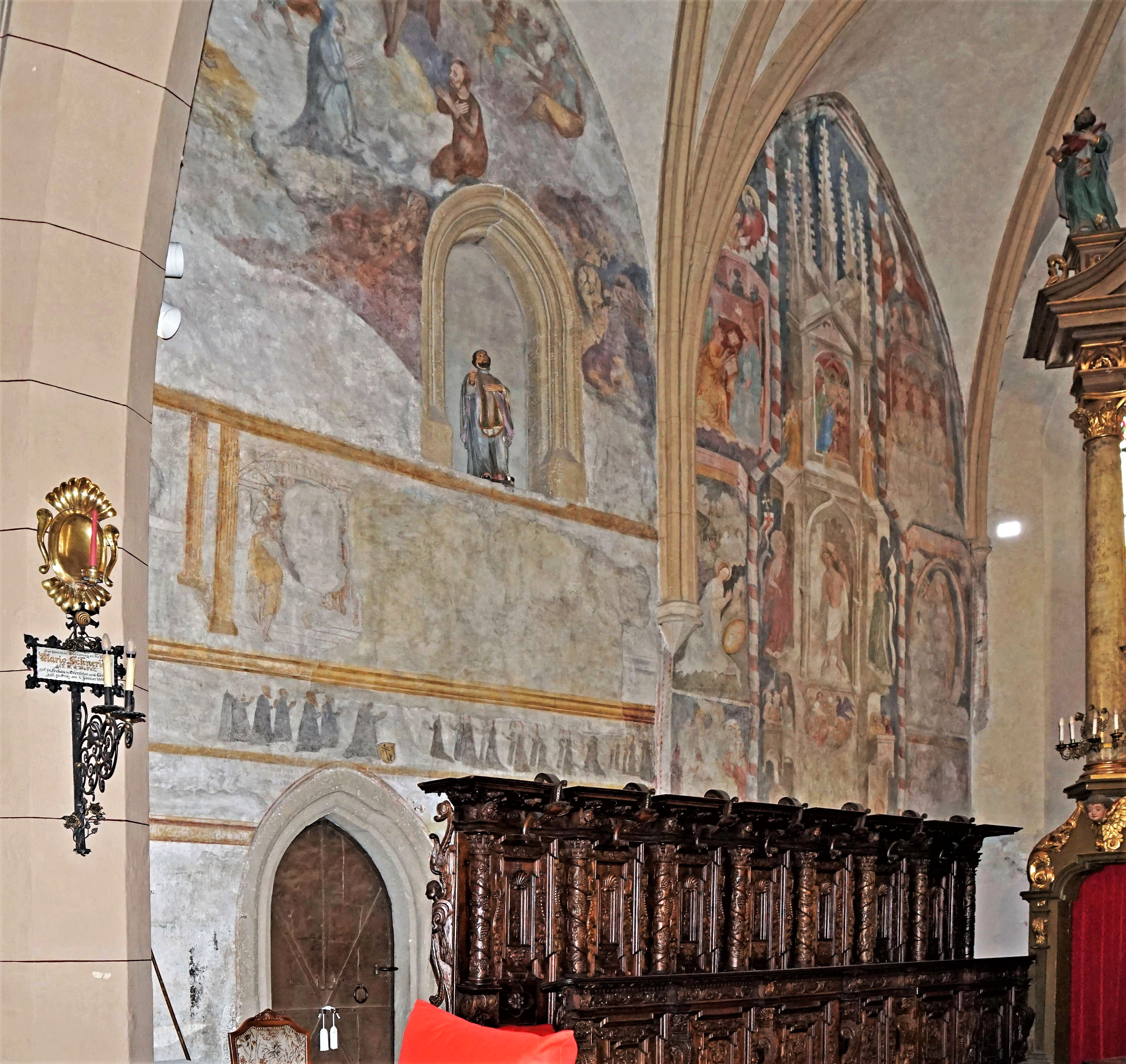
Look into the choir

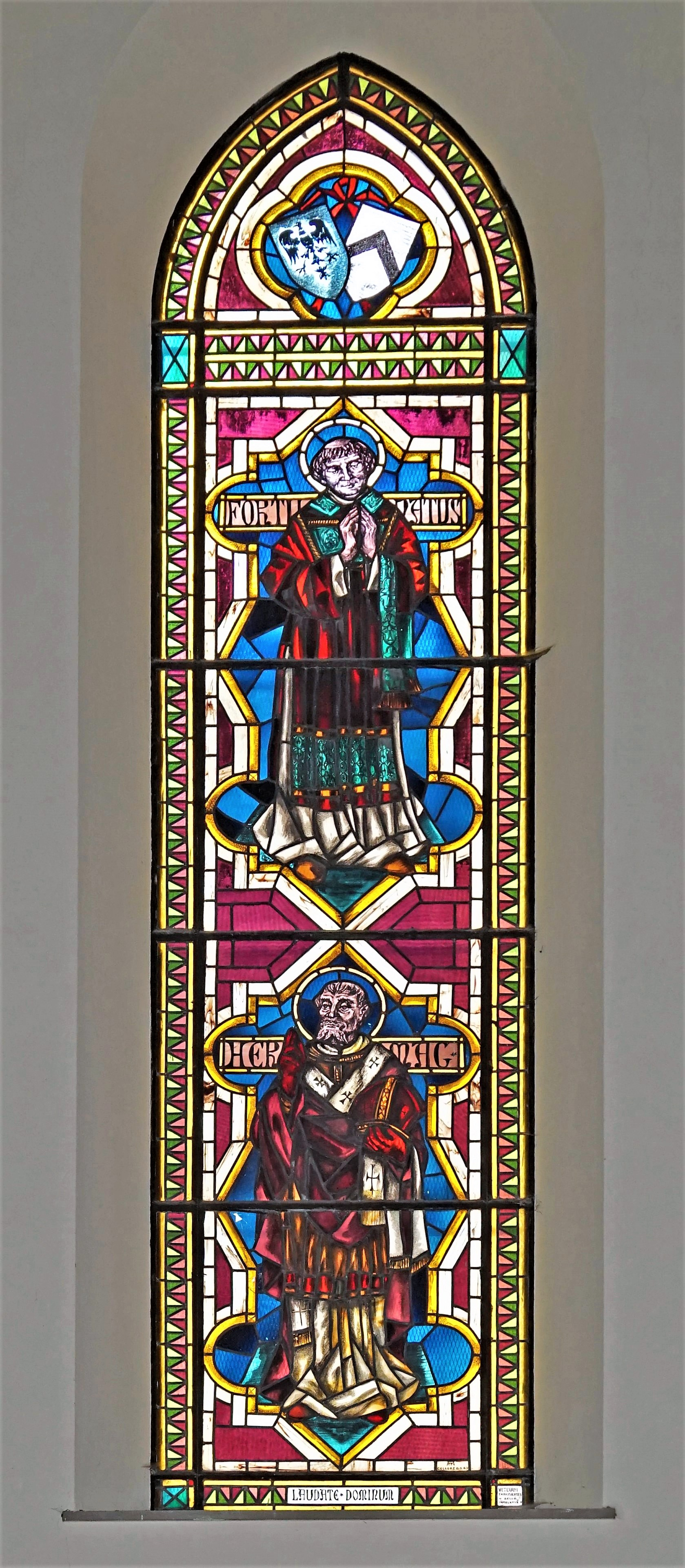
Window with the Saints Hermagoras and Fortunatus in the nave

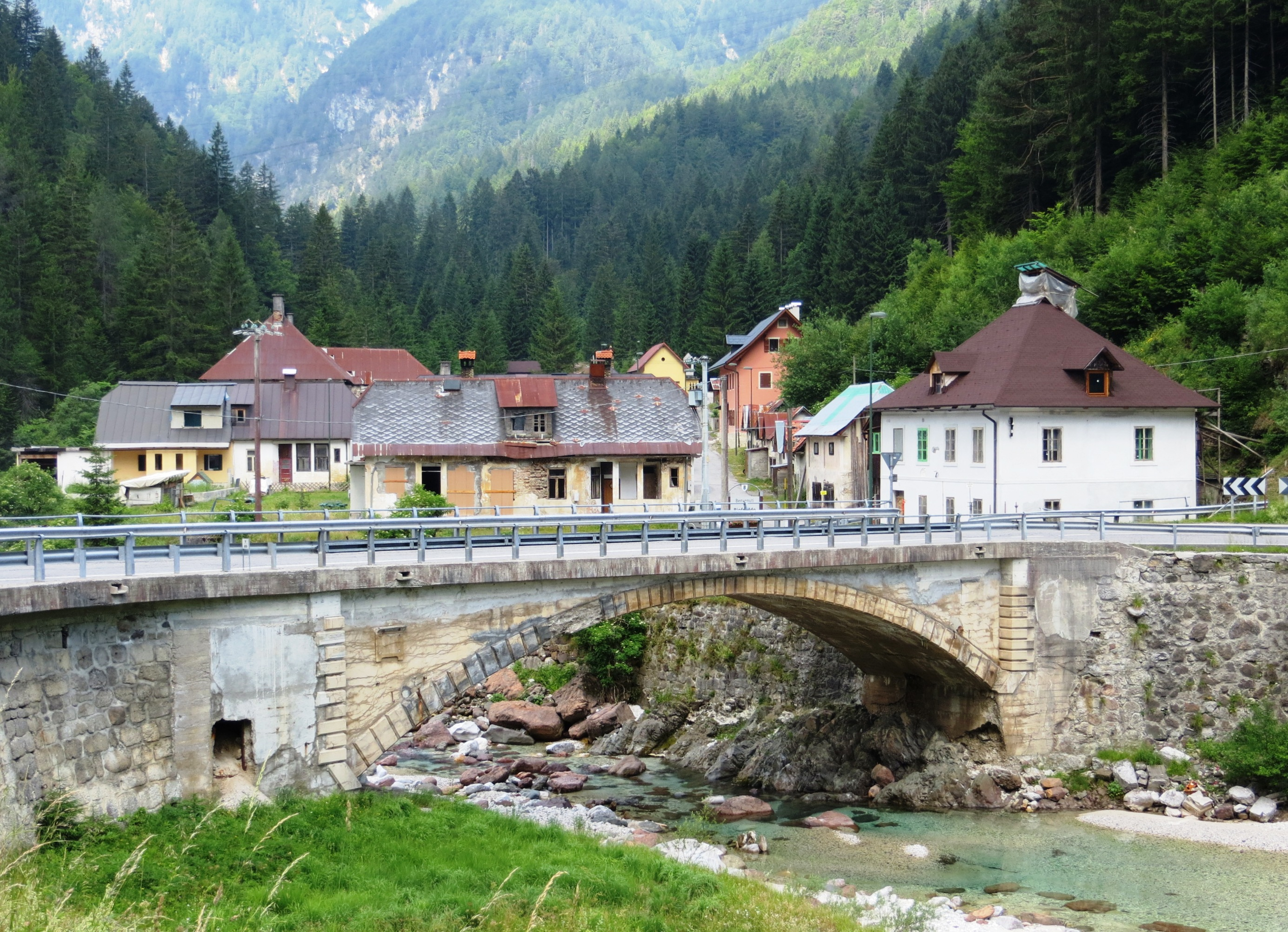
Riofreddo

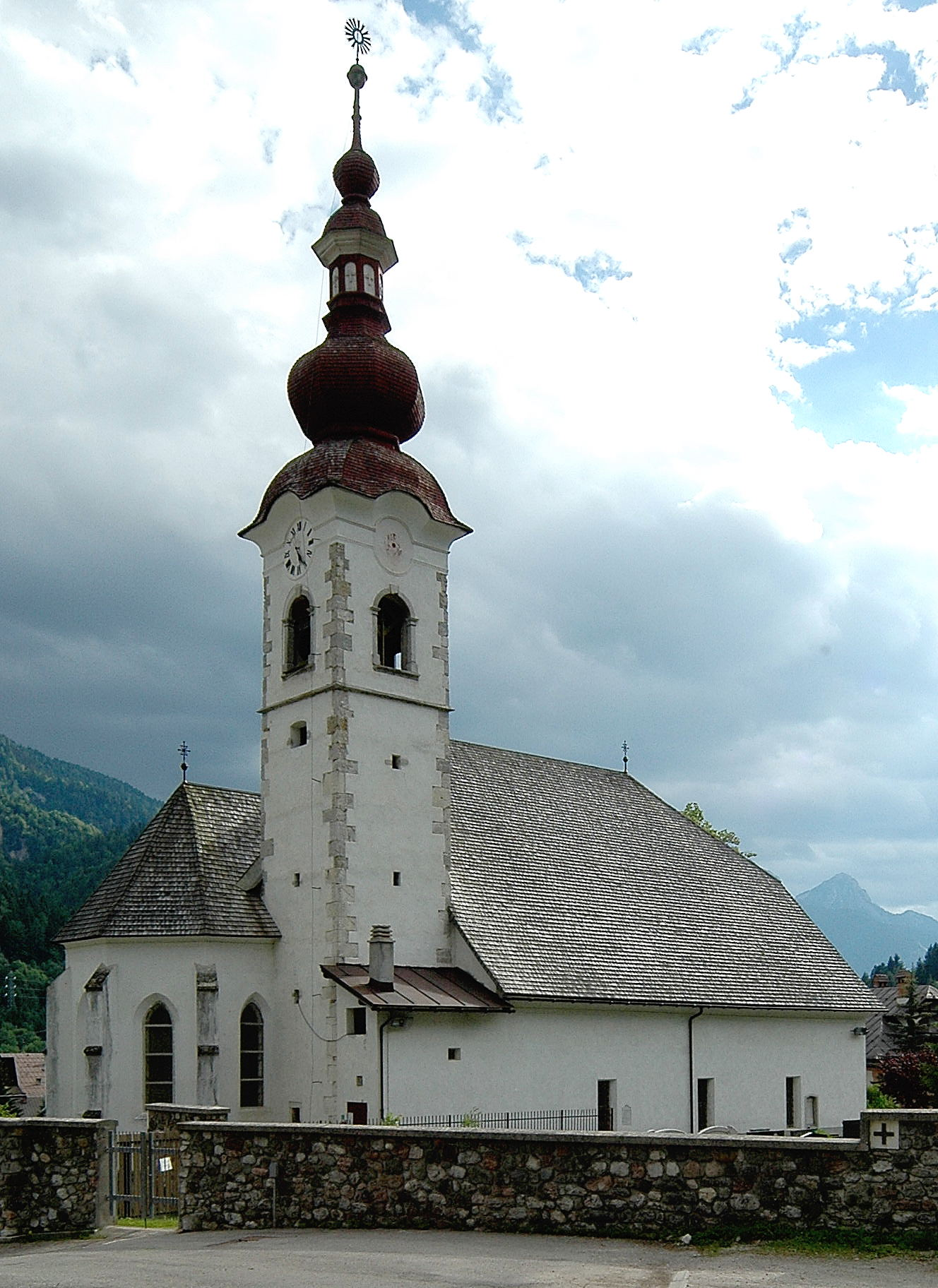
Camporosso Church

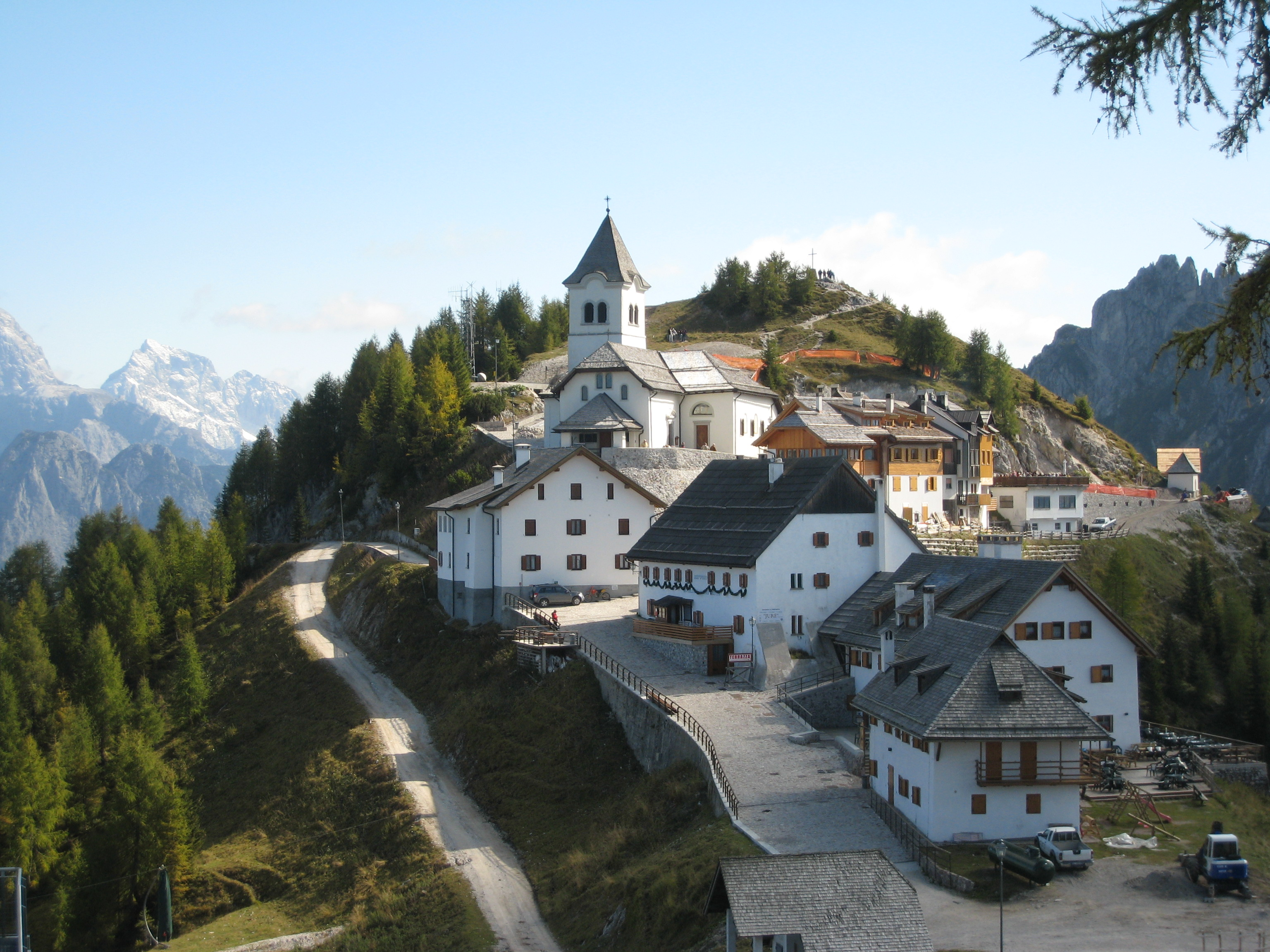
Sanctuary Holy Mount of Lussari
