= Nikova =

Stream in western Slovenia

Coordinates: 46°00′10″N 14°01′40″E

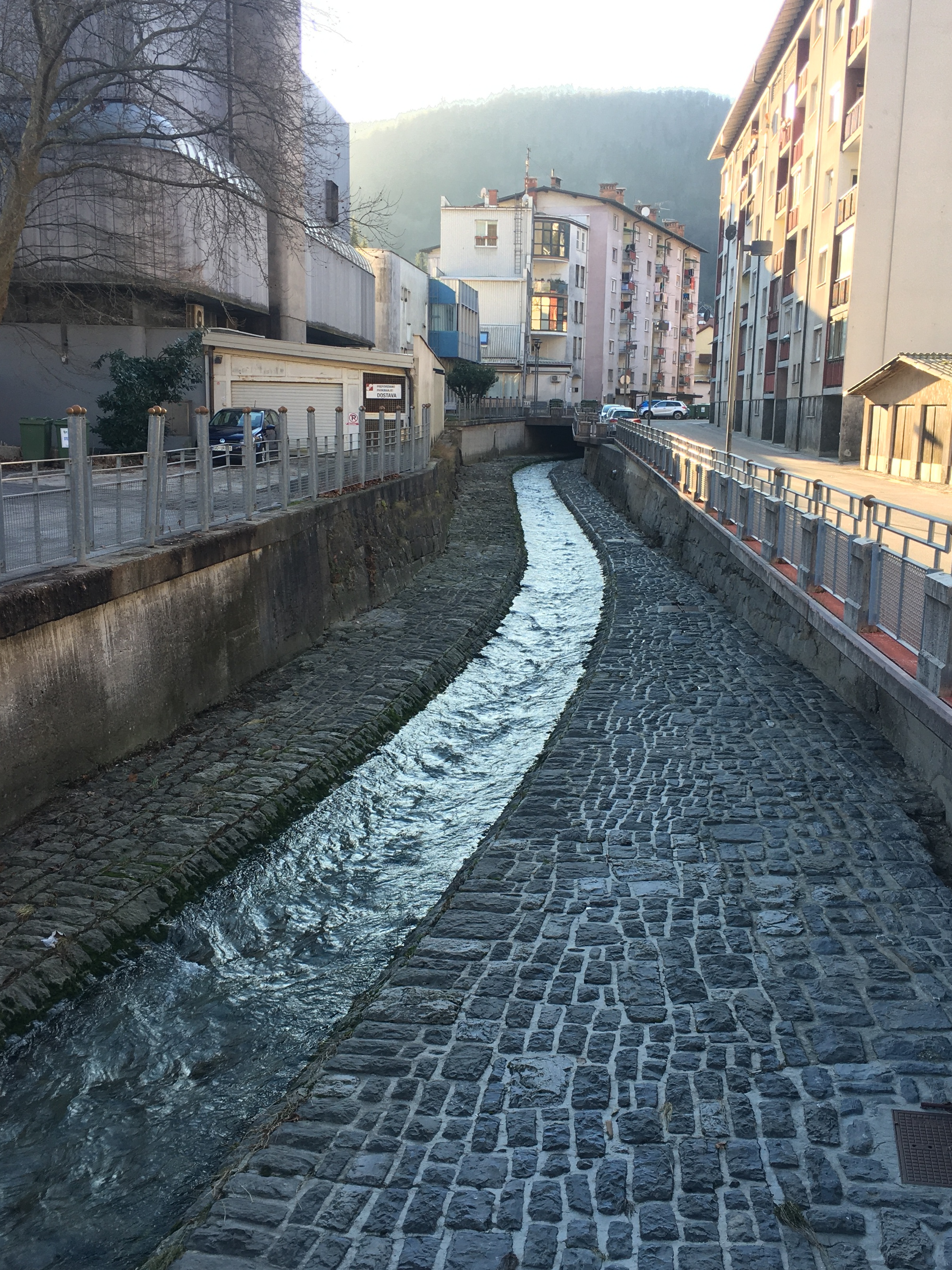
Nikova in a concrete channel, December 2023

Nikova is a stream in western Slovenia and the second left tributary of the river Idrijca. The confluence of Nikova and Idrijca is in Idrija. It originates southeast of Rejec Hill (Slovene: Rejcov grič, lit. Breeder Hill) near the hamlet of Kočevše, which is part of the Čekovnik settlement. From its source, it flows for about 1.5 km (0.9 miles) through a gorge in SE direction and then changes direction to NE for approximately 1.5 km (0.9 miles). The lower part of the flow goes for another 1.5 km (0.9 miles) through the center of Idrija in a man-made concrete channel until it meets the Idrijca River.

== Hydrology ==
Rivers in the broader Idrija area originally flowed southeast towards the Hotenje Basin and the Ljubljanica river, but due to the karstification of the Ljubljana Basin and erosion of the Soča River, the rivers began to flow into the Soča river basin instead. The initial part of the Nikova River's course is a remnant of a former larger river that also shaped the Hleviše Saddles and reached the area of today's Zala stream east of Divje jezero. In the past, the river then continued to flow past Godovič pond and discharged into a larger river near Hotedršica. The former river cut through softer stratigraphic layers in the Zala fault area, while elsewhere it formed alongside of thrust faults. Nikova is believed to have played a significant role in the formation of a vadose zone, of which both Divje Lake and the Padarca stream are now part of.

Due to its course and limited self-purifying capacity, Nikova is the most heavily ecologically affected water body in the municipality of Idrija.

== Geology ==
Nikova initially flows through shallow marine gray or white dolomite with dolomite conglomerate and sandstone, then predominantly through carbonate rocks, followed by shallow marine clastic rocks of shale and marl. As it flows through Idrija, it runs through shallow marine thin-layered limestone with dolomite interbeds, and a shorter section passes through deep-sea flysch with dark gray shale and quartz lenses just before its confluence. Nikova, like other surrounding rivers, took advantage of the faults of the Dinaric direction.

== Flora ==
Above the Nikova canyon, there are also rare and protected species of meadow orchids for Slovenia, such as Cypripedium calceolus and the Epipactis purpurata.

== Archaeometallurgy ==
In the early years of mining in a part of Idrija’s center, Pront, native mercury was extracted from the mined rocks by washing it in the Nikova stream. Until around 1510, when ore roasting near Idrija stopped, the burnt ore residues were deposited on the banks of the Nikova River. The natural migration of mercury is very limited and occurs only in certain outcrops and along the Nikova and Idrijca rivers, which are located downstream from the outflows.

Nikova was dammed in 1533 below the Gewerkenegg Castle to drive a pump for mine water in Ahacij shaft but was ineffective due to lack of water. In June 1587, in an attempt to save the pump and the mine, Ruprecht Pebinger ordered the raising of the dam for a more constant flow of water, but the pump stopped working in 1588. It was replaced in 1591 by a double pump on the nearby Barbara shaft. In the 18th century, grain mills also stood in the Nikova riverbed.
