= Joseph Mrakh =

Carniolan cartographer (1709–1786)

- Born: February 25, 1709; Idrija, Holy Roman Empire (now Slovenia)
- Died: August 14, 1786 (aged 77); Idrija, Holy Roman Empire (now Slovenia)
- Occupations: Surveyor, cartographer

Joseph Mrakh (Slovenized: Jožef Mrak, February 25, 1709 – August 14, 1786) was a Carniolan surveyor and cartographer.

Mrakh was born in Idrija (now Slovenia). He is remembered as a highly skilled mine surveyor, geodesist, cartographer, lecturer at vocational schools, and painter, and especially as the builder of logging sluices (Slovene: klavže) on the Idrijca and Belca rivers.

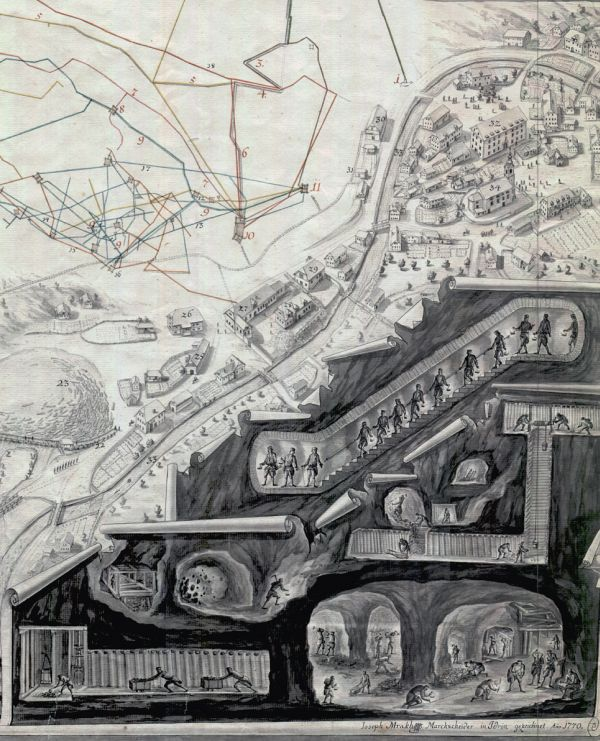
Sketch of the Idrija mercury mine and layout of Idrija by Joseph Mrakh (1770)

Mrakh was the leader and main representative of the Idrija Cartographic School. After 1736, as a mining trainee, he produced several plans of the Idrija mercury mine, and in 1744 a map of Idrija. He mapped ore deposits in Carinthia, the Karawanks, the Central Sava Valley, and Moravia. He designed a new smelting facility in Idrija, an ore smelter in Banská Štiavnica (now Slovakia), and logging sluices: the Brus logging sluice (Brusove klavže) and Putrih logging sluice (Putrihove klavže) on the Belca River, the Idrijca Logging Sluice (Klavže na Idrijci), and the Smrečne klavže on the Zala River. After 1750 he mapped the roads from Idrija to Godovič and from Eisenerz to Trofaiach (in Austria). In 1752 he was a lecturer in surveying at the Idrija Mining School, and from 1763 to 1769 at the Metallurgical and Chemical School. He trained several cartographers, and his work was continued by his son Anton Mrakh (1739–1801).

During its renovation in the 18th century, he decorated Assumption Church in Spodnja Idrija with frescoes. Mrakh's extensive and valuable cartographic estate is held by museums and archives in Idrija, Ljubljana, and Vienna. Due to Mrakh's significant contribution to Slovenian science, he was included in the book Sto slovenskih znanstvenikov (One Hundred Slovenian Scientists).

Joseph Mrakh died in Idrija at the age of 77.
