= Bukovo, Cerkno =

Bukovo
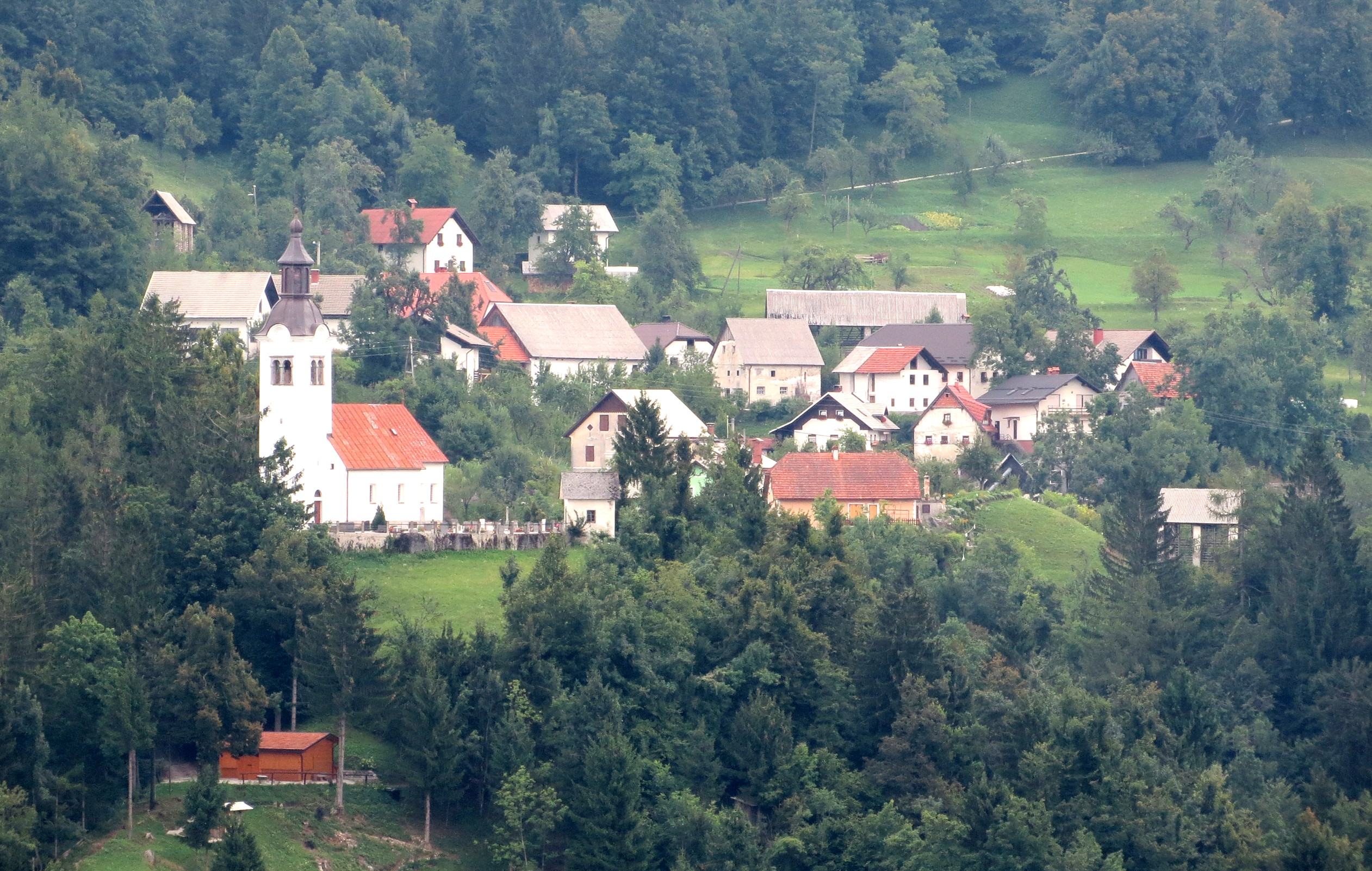

- Location in Slovenia
- Coordinates: 46°8′54.14″N 13°54′22.46″E
- Country: Slovenia
- Traditional region: Littoral
- Statistical region: Gorizia
- Municipality: Cerkno

Area
  - Total: 8.73 km^{2} (3.37 sq mi)
- Elevation: 709 m (2,326 ft)

Population (2020)
  - Total: 173
  - Density: 19.8/km^{2} (51.3/sq mi)

Bukovo (pronounced [ˈbuːkɔʋɔ]) is a settlement in the Municipality of Cerkno in the traditional Littoral region of Slovenia.

== Geography ==
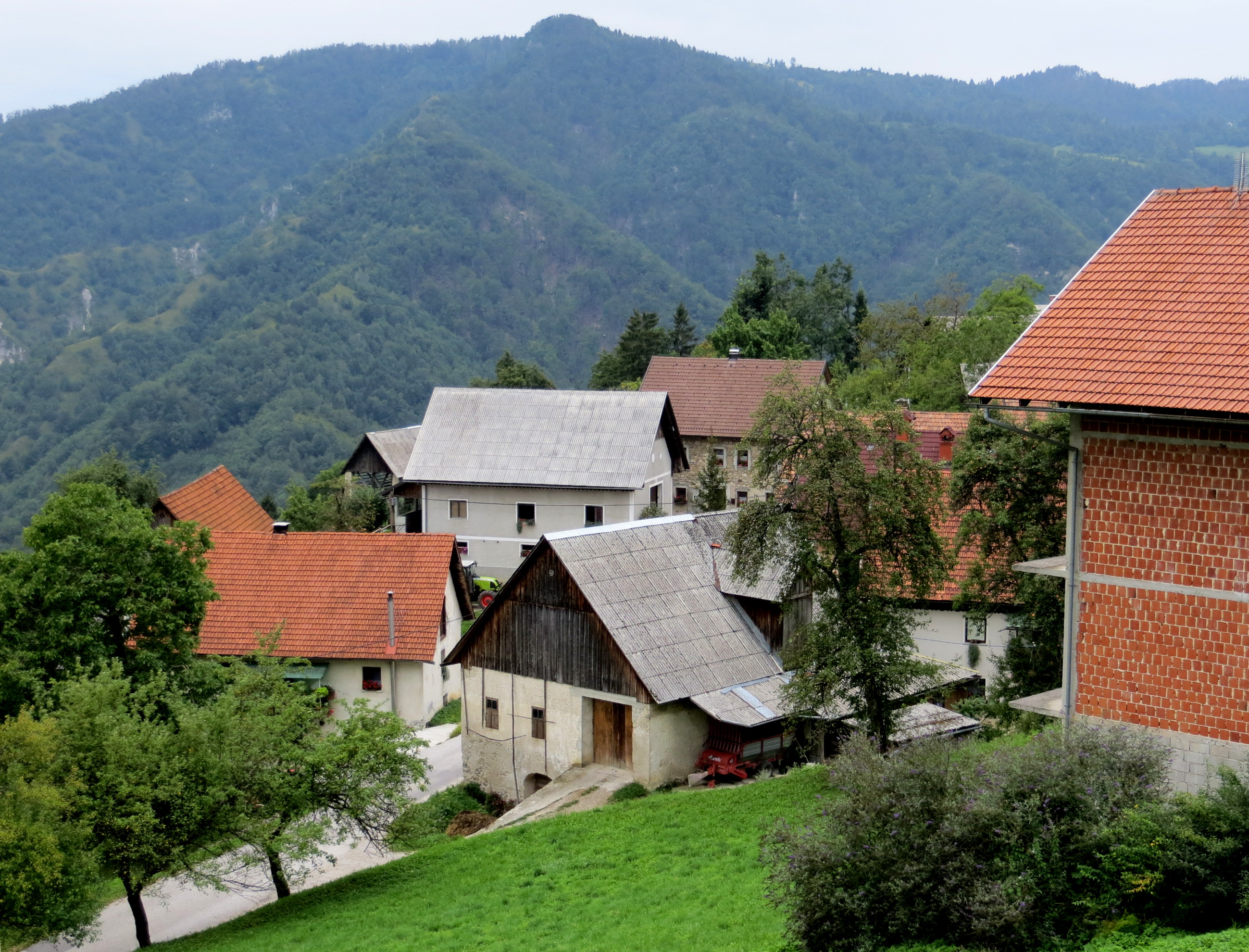
The hamlet of Kojca

Bukovo is a scattered village along the southwest slope of Mount Kojca (1,303 meters or 4,275 feet) on the saddle between the valleys of the Bača and Idrijca rivers. It also includes several hamlets southeast of the village center: Krtečne, Kojca, Selc, Žabže (or Žabče), and Laharn (from north to south). The soil is sandy and marly. The tilled fields lie on steep slopes, which traditionally necessitated carrying the last furrow plowed to the top of the slope by hand, or using oxen or a block-and-tackle system.

== History ==
Kojca is the oldest of the hamlets comprising Bukovo. In 1652 it was mentioned as the seat of a district that also included Bukovo, Krtečne, Žabže, and Selc. Most of the hamlet of Selc burned in 1935 because of a lightning strike. During the Second World War, German forces burned two houses and a hayrack in Bukovo and looted the village on November 1, 1943. The hamlet of Žabže was burned on June 10, 1944; during the attack, three men were killed and four women burned to death.

== Names ==
The name Bukovo is derived from the word buk 'beech'. Like similar names (e.g., Bukovica, Bukovec, Bukovci), it originally referred to the local vegetation. The hamlet of Kojca shares its name with Mount Kojca; the hamlet name is believed to derive from the mountain, presumably derived from koza, meaning 'goat', thus 'goat mountain'. It was attested as Cosiza in historical sources and is derived via diphthongization and reduction (*Kozca > *Kojzca > Kojca). The hamlet name Žabže is a result of reduction. It was attested as Sapulsach (a locative form) in historical records and is derived from *Zapolže (> *Zapuže > *Zapže > Zabže). The hamlet name Laharn is of unclear origin. It is probably not derived from Lah 'Italian', as claimed by some sources, because old attestations (Lochar in 1566 and Locar in 1600) indicate that the first vowel was originally an o.

== Church ==
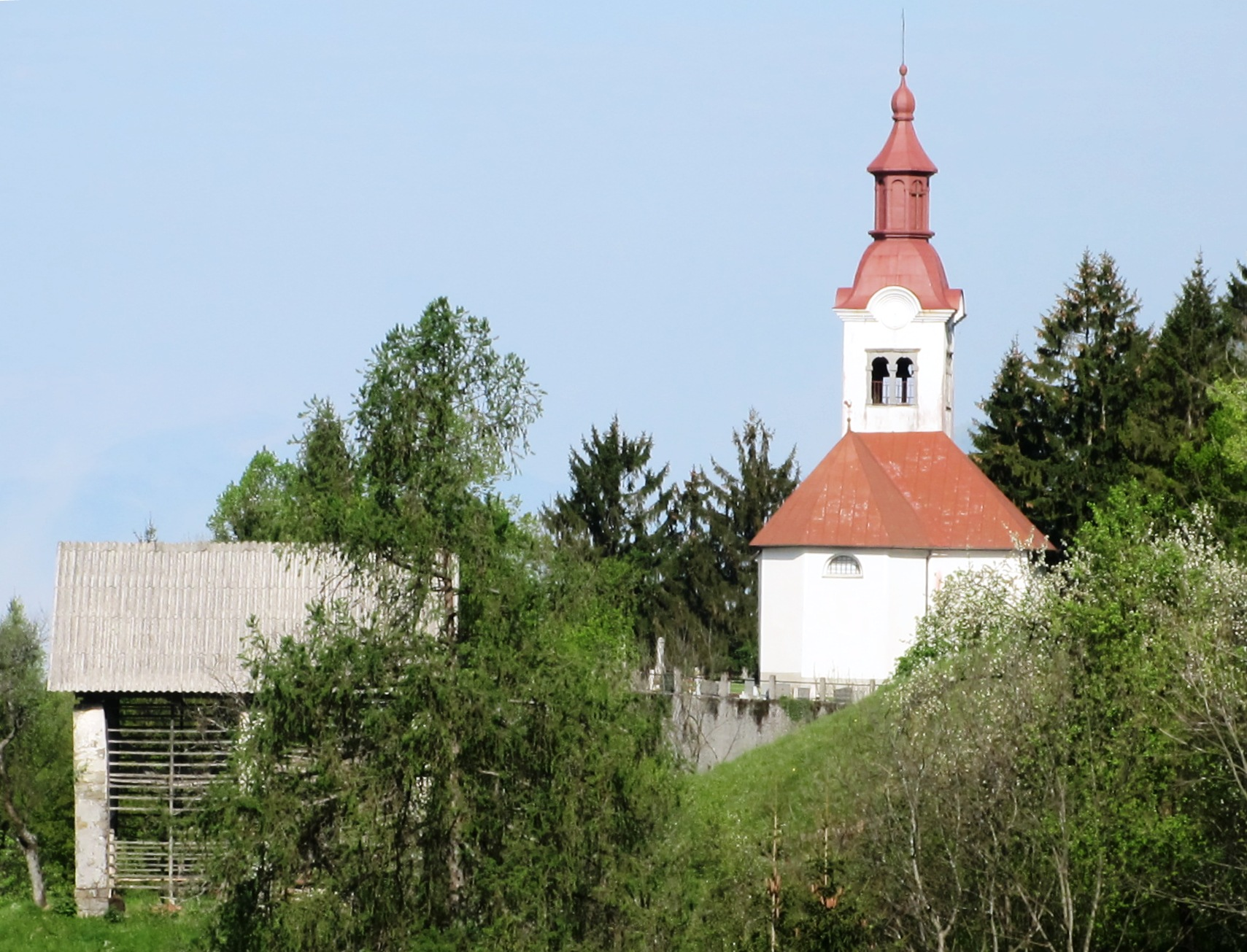
Saint Leonard's Church

The parish church in the settlement is dedicated to Saint Leonard and belongs to the Koper Diocese. It stands on a small rise west of the village. It was built in the 18th century and consists of an octagonal presbytery walled on three sides, a broad rectangular nave, and a belfry. The furnishings include a 19th-century altar from the workshop in Idrija. The church is surrounded by a cemetery, which also contains a Partisan memorial.

== Other cultural heritage ==
There is a Partisan memorial on the main road southeast of the settlement, between the houses at Bukovo no. 33 and 33a. It consists of six upright stone blocks and was designed by Nande Rupnik. It was erected in 1982.
