= Zakojca =

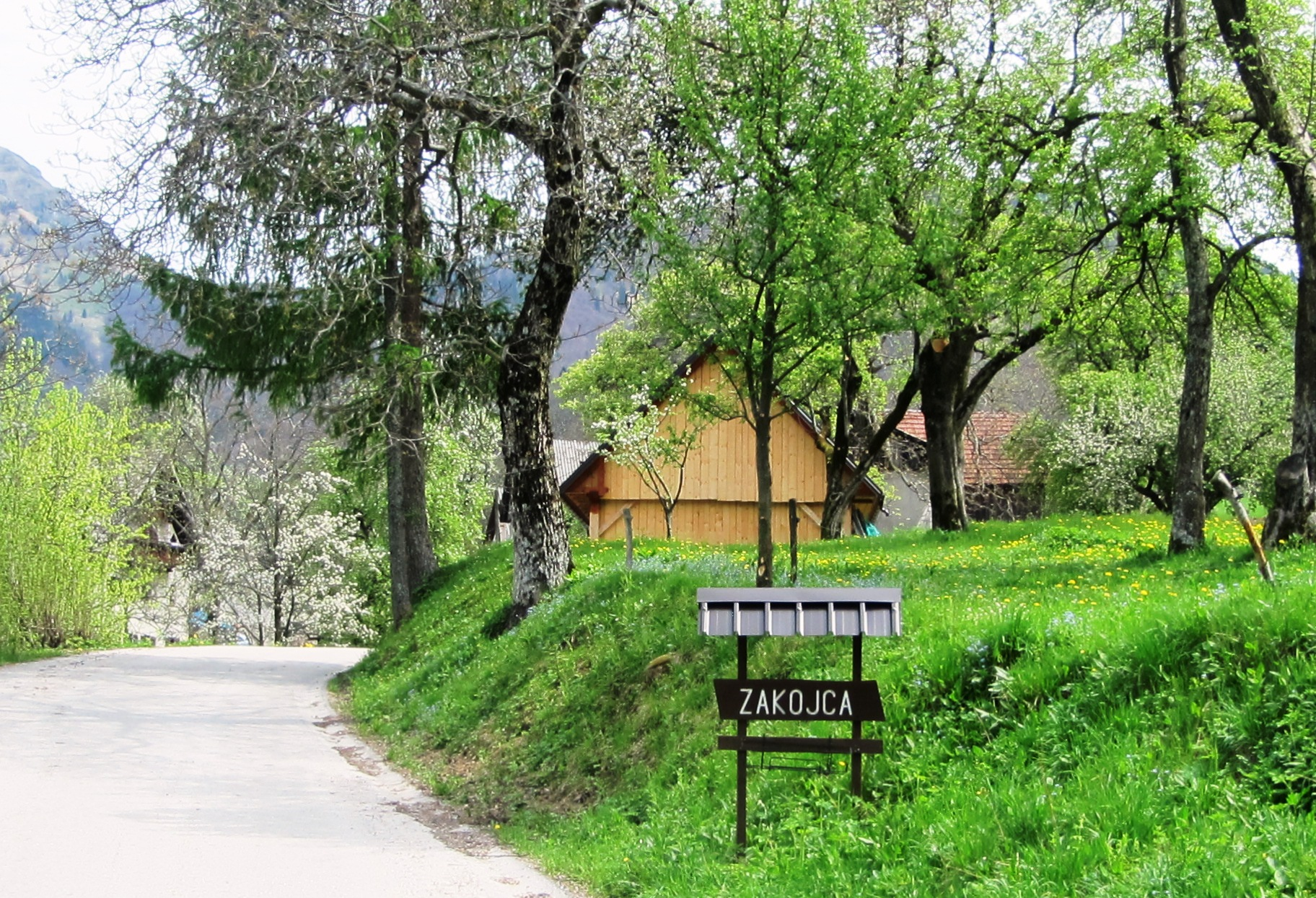

- Location in Slovenia
- Coordinates: 46°9′56″N 13°55′40″E
- Country: Slovenia
- Traditional region: Littoral
- Statistical region: Gorizia
- Municipality: Cerkno

Area
  - Total: 7.45 km^{2} (2.88 sq mi)
- Elevation: 708 m (2,323 ft)

Population (2020)
  - Total: 42
  - Density: 5.6/km^{2} (15/sq mi)

Zakojca (pronounced [zaˈkoːi̯tsa]) is a settlement in the Municipality of Cerkno in the traditional Littoral region of Slovenia. It consists of three hamlets: Dolnja Vas, Srednja Vas, and Gornja Vas (Slovene: Dolnja vas, Srednja vas, Gornja vas).

== Name ==
The name of the settlement is derived from Mount Kojca. It is a fused prepositional phrase that has lost case inflection (za + Kojca, literally 'behind Mount Kojca') and refers to the settlement's location on the opposite (north) side of Mount Kojca in relation to other nearby villages on the south side of the mountain.

== France Bevk home ==
Zakojca is best known as the birthplace of the writer France Bevk. The house where he was born—a small half-stone, half-log building known as "Jernej's shed" (Jernejeva pajštva)—is no longer standing. The house where he spent his childhood is known as the Volar Farm (Volarjeva domačija) and is located at Zakojca no. 10 in the hamlet of Dolnja Vas. The house was purchased at an auction by Bevk's grandfather Jakob when Bevk was three years old. The house contains a small ethnological museum downstairs and a literary history museum in the attic with exhibits related to Bevk and his life and work. The home was registered as a Slovenian cultural heritage site in 1986.

== Other cultural heritage ==
There is a double hayrack belonging to the farm at Zakojca no. 1. It bears a stone inscription with the Christogram IHS, the year 1832, and the name Jakob Klousher (i.e., Jakob Klavžar).

There is a Partisan monument in the eastern part of the hamlet of Srednja Vas. It consists of a plaque mounted on a concrete block and a concrete pillar on the right side topped by a five-pointed star. The monument was unveiled on 19 August 1951.

== Recreation ==
The Flander Farm (Pri Flandru) at Zakojca no. 1 offers farm stays and has an inn. The settlement is also a starting point for hikes to Mount Kojca, Mount Porezen, and the Zakojca Ravine (Zakojška grapa), as well as the Bača Ravine (Baška grapa).

== Gallery ==
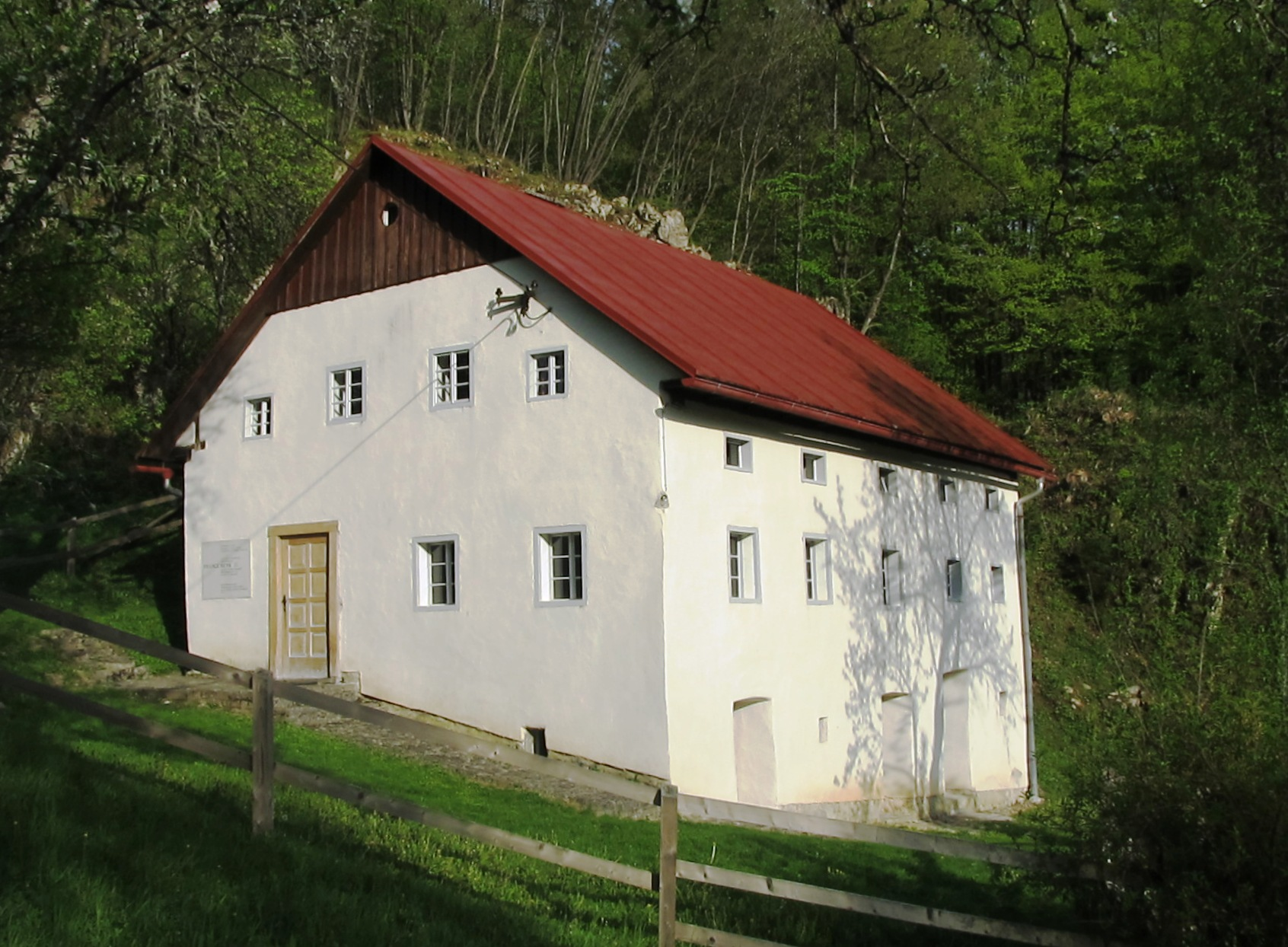
France Bevk's childhood home

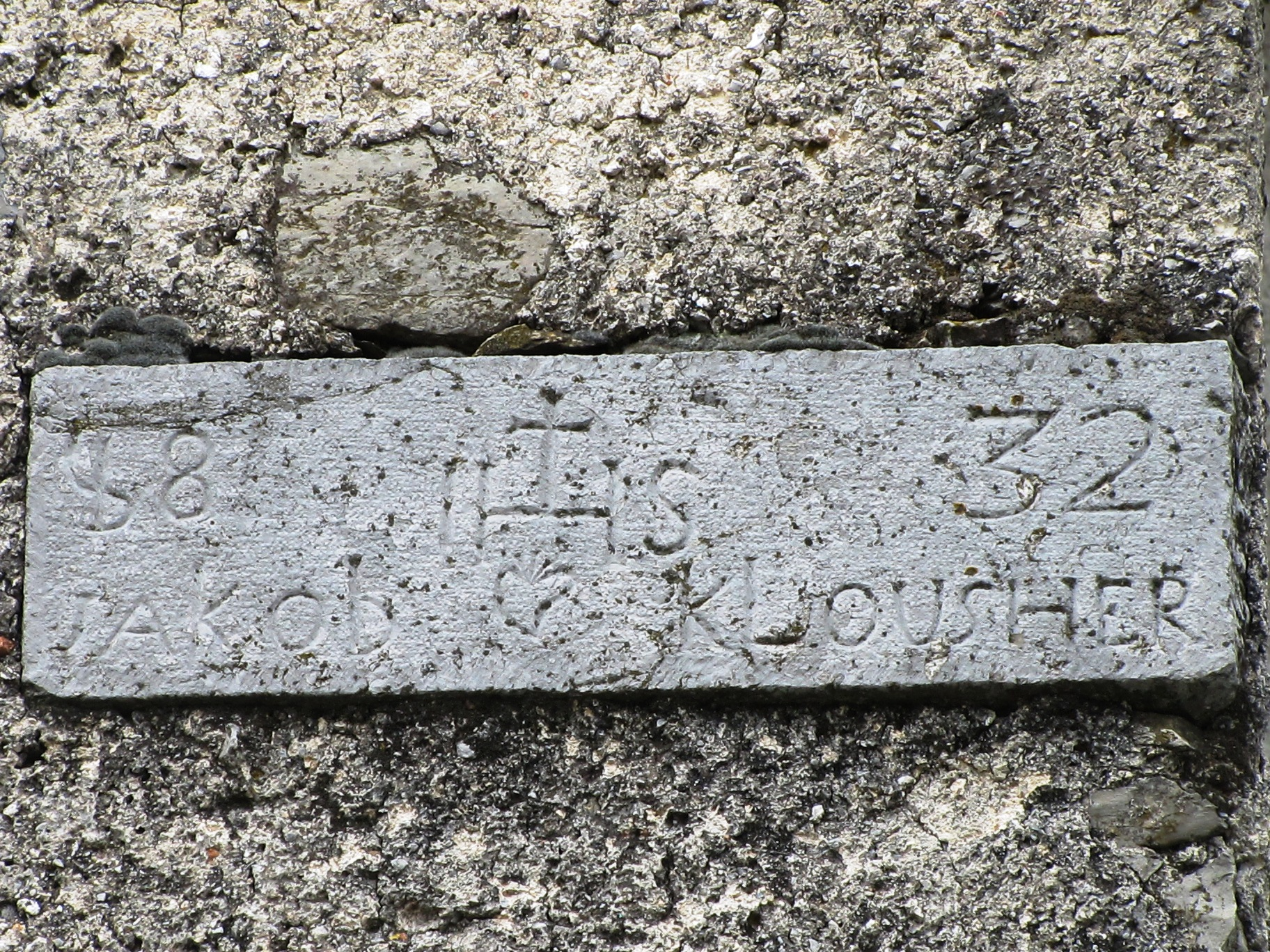
Hayrack plaque with the year 1832
