= France Bevk =

Slovenian writer (1890–1970)

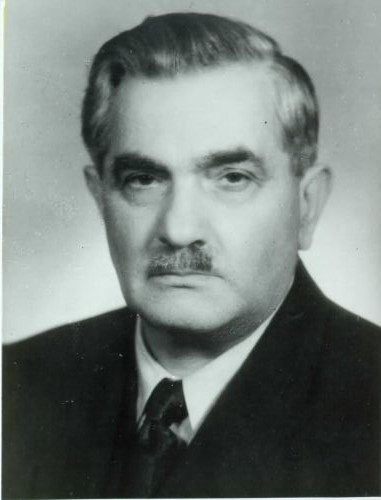
- France Bevk in 1953
- Born: 17 September 1890; Zakojca near Cerkno, Austrian Littoral, Austria-Hungary
- Died: 17 September 1970 (aged 80); Ljubljana, SR Slovenia, SFR Yugoslavia
- Occupation: Writer
- Writing career
- Notable work: The Vicar Martin Čedermac
- Notable awards: Prešeren Award
- Movements: Expressionism, social realism

France Bevk (17 September 1890 – 17 September 1970) was a Slovene writer, poet and translator. He also wrote under the pseudonym Pavle Sedmak.

== Biography ==
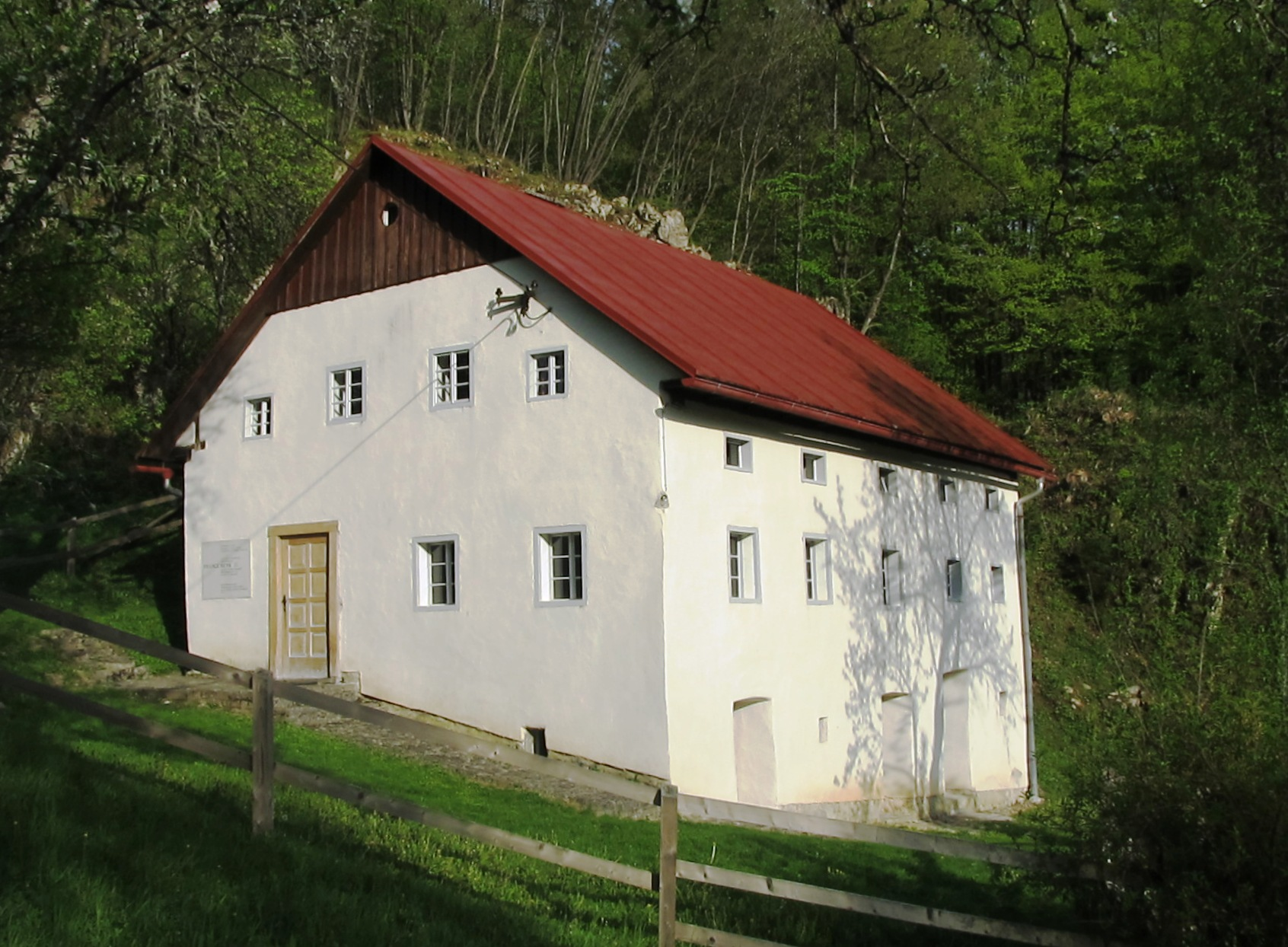
Bevk's childhood home

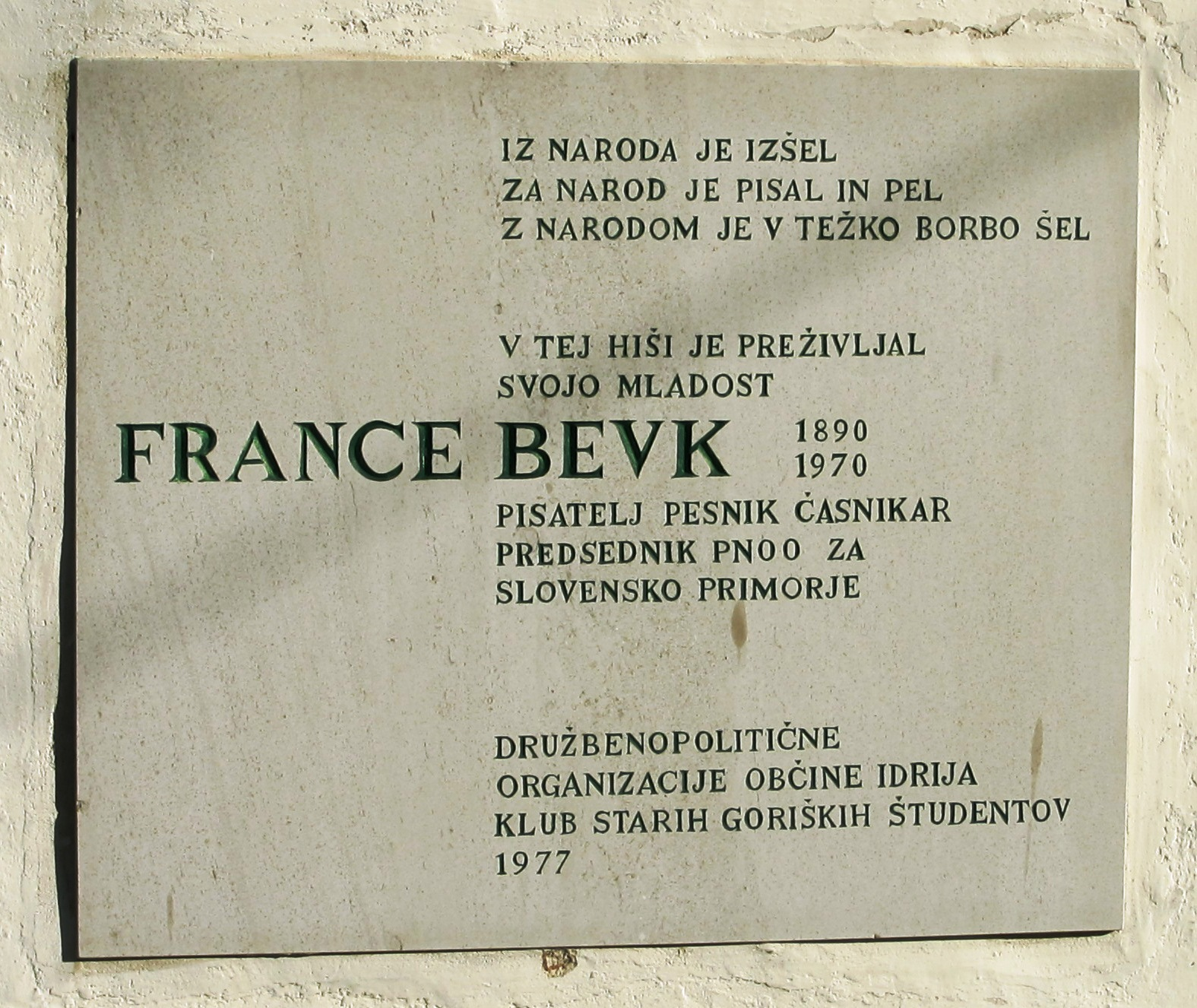
Plaque on the Bevk house

The Bevk home in Zakojca

Bevk was born in the mountain village of Zakojca (Coizza during Italian rule, now part of the Municipality of Cerkno) in the County of Gorizia and Gradisca of what was then the Austro-Hungarian Empire, now in Slovenia. He was the oldest of eight children born to the tenant farmer and shoemaker Ivan Bevk and his wife Katarina (née Čufer).

Bevk attended school in Bukovo until 1904, and then in Kranj (1905), Koper (1908), and Gorizia (1909), and became a teacher in the Slovene Littoral. His first teaching position was in the village of Orehek. During the First World War he was a soldier on the Eastern Front and for a while at a military school in Hungary.

After the war he worked for various newspapers in Ljubljana. In 1920 he moved to Gorizia dedicating himself to cultural and political activism in the Slovene Littoral, then under Italian rule. He was frequently prosecuted by Italian Fascist authorities and interned for his activities. In 1935 he had to leave the Julian March and moved to Ljubljana, in the Kingdom of Yugoslavia. There, he came in contact with the vibrant cultural life of the Slovenian capital, becoming friends with figures such as the painter Zoran Mušič, writer Vladimir Bartol, political activist and author Lavo Čermelj, literary critic Josip Vidmar and art historian France Stele.

After the Axis invasion of Yugoslavia in April 1941, he was imprisoned by the Italian occupation authorities due to his public Anti-Fascist stance. In 1943, he escaped from prison and joined the Slovene Partisans. After the end of World War II, he moved to Trieste and later back to Ljubljana. In 1953 he became a member of the Slovenian Academy of Sciences and Arts. He received the Prešeren Award, the most prestigious award for artistic achievements in Slovenia, twice, in 1949 and in 1954. He died in Ljubljana on his 80th birthday.

== Work ==
Bevk started writing at the age of sixteen with encouragement from the influential feminist editor Zofka Kveder. In his early poems, Bevk was influenced by the vitalist poetry of Oton Župančič and Maurice Maeterlinck. After the experience of World War I, he came under the influence of Christian expressionism which represented a strong literary and artistic current in interwar Slovenia. Some of its most talented representatives, such as the poet Joža Lovrenčič and Ivan Pregelj, came from Bevk's native region of Goriška. At first, he followed their examples, but later moved to social realism. He became known in the 1930s with his novels describing the struggle of the Slovene people from the Julian March to maintain their identity against the Fascist Italianization. His best-known work was the novel Kaplan Martin Čedermac (The Vicar Martin Čedermac), in which he described the inner struggles of a Roman Catholic priest in the westernmost Slovene ethnic region known as Venetian Slovenia. The novel was published under a pseudonym by the publishing house Slovenska matica in 1938 and soon became a best-seller. The term Čedermac is still used in Slovene to refer to the Roman Catholic clergy in the Slovene Littoral that struggled to defend the Slovene identity of their flock under the Italian Fascist regime. His realist literature pay attention to topics of land ownership, arranged marriage, alcoholism and conservativism in rural settings.

Later in his life, Bevk devoted himself largely to children's literature. He was a very prolific author: when a complete bibliography was made on the occasion of his 70th birthday, it was determined that Bevk had written over 100 books.

== Legacy ==
Although Bevk is still revered as the author of the popular novel The Vicar Martin Čedermac, he is mostly remembered as an author of children's literature. The regional library in Nova Gorica is named after him, as well as the central square in the town.

== Bibliography ==
=== Poetry ===
- Pesmi (Poems) (1921)
- Smeh skozi solze (Laughter Through Tears) (1959)

=== Adult works ===
- Faraon (Pharaoh) (1922)
- Rablji (Executioners) (1923)
- Suženj demona (Slave of the Demon) (1925)
- Kajn (Cain) (1925) (drama)
- Smrt pred hišo (Death Before the House) (1925), re-published with major changes in 1934 under the title Ljudje pod Osojnikom (People Beneath Osojnik)
- Muka gospe Vere (The Torments of Mrs. Vera) (1925)
- Julijan Sever (1926)
- Beg pred senco (Fleeing Before the Shadow) (1926)
- Hiša v strugi (The House in the Riverbed) (1927)
- Jakec in njegova ljubezen (Jackie and His Love) (1927)
- Kresna noč (Bonfire Night) [of the Summer Solstice] (1927) (a historical novel)
- Krvavi jezdeci (The Bloody Riders), (1927), part 1 of the Znamenja na nebu (Signs in the Sky) trilogy
- Vihar (Storm) (1928)
- Krivda (Blame) (1929)
- Škorpijoni zemlje (Scorpions of the Earth), (1929), part 2 of the Znamenja na nebu (Signs in the Sky) trilogy
- V zablodah (In Delusions) (1929; rewritten with new title Zablode (Delusions) in 1963)
- Mati (Mother) (1929)
- Črni bratje in sestre (Black Brothers and Sisters), (1929), part 3 of the Znamenja na nebu (Signs in the Sky) trilogy
- Gospodična Irma (Miss Irma) (1930)
- Mrtvi se vračajo (The Dead Return) (1930)
- Kamnarjev Jurij (Jurij from the Kamnar Farm) (1930)
- Vedomec (Spirit) (1930)
- Človek proti človeku (Man Against Man) (1930)
- Umirajoči bog Triglav (The Dying God Triglav) (1930, 1960, 2018)
- Burkež gospoda Viterga (Sir Viterg's Jester) (1931)
- Stražni ognji (Guard Fires) (1931)
- In sonce je obstalo (And The Sun Stood Still) (1931, published in book form in 1963)
- Železna kača (The Iron Snake) (1932)
- Žerjavi (Cranes) (1932)
- Veliki Tomaž (Big Thomas) (1932)
- Dedič (The Heir) (1933)
- Gmajna (Woods) (1933)
- Človek brez krinke (Man Without a Mask) (1934; reissued with the title Brez krinke (Without a Mask) in 1960)
- Huda ura (Heavy Weather) (1934)
- Ubogi zlodej (Poor Devil) (1934)
- Samote (Lonelinesses) (1935)
- V mestu gorijo luči (The Lights are on in Town) (1936)
- Srebrniki (Silver Coins) (1936)
- Začudene oči (Surprised Eyes) (1936)
- Kaplan Martin Čedermac (The Vicar Martin Čedermac) (1938)
- Pravica do življenja (A Right to Life) (1939)
- Dan se je nagibal (The Day Was Coming) (1939)
- Domačija (Homestead) (1939; published as a book in 1960)
- Mlada njiva (New Field) (1940)
- Med dvema vojnama (Between Two Wars) (1946)
- Novele (Short Stories) (1947)
- Obračun (Settlement) (1950)
- Še bo kdaj pomlad (It Will Be Spring Again) (1950) (film script)
- Pot v svobodo (Road into Freedom) (1953)
- Tuja kri (Foreign Blood) (1954)
- Krivi računi (Wrong Dealings) (1956)
- Črna srajca (Blackshirt) (1956)
- Iskra pod pepelom (A Spark Beneath the Ashes)(1956)
- Viharnik (Storm-Weathered Tree) (1957)
- Mrak za rešetkami (Gloom Behind Bars) (1958)
- Slepa ulica (Blind Alley) (1961)

=== Juvenile fiction ===
- Tatič (The Little Thief) (1916–1917)
- Jagoda (Strawberry) (1930)
- Lukec in njegov škorec (Little Luka and His Starling) (1931)
- Lukec išče očeta (Little Luka Looks for Father) (1932)
- Kozorog (The Ibex) (1933)
- Tovariša (Two Comrades) (1934)
- Pastirci (Little Shepherds) (1935)
- Pestrna (The Nanny) (1939)
- Tonček (Little Tony) (1948)
- Mali upornik (The Little Rebel) (1951)
- Črni bratje (The Black Brothers) (1952)
- Razbojnik Saladin (Saladin the Bandit) (1959)
- Učiteljica Breda (Breda the Teacher) (1963)
- Iz iskre požar (From a Spark, Conflagration) (1963)

== See also ==
- Slovenian literature
- Culture of Slovenia
- Liberation Front of the Slovenian People
