= Ljubevščica =

River in Slovenia

Coordinates: 45°59′43″N 14°02′01″E

Ljubevščica is a stream in western Slovenia on the outskirts of Idrija and the second right tributary of the Idrijca River. It originates between Kovačev Rovt and Reber, hamlets of the settlement Gore. After a 3 kilometres (1.9 mi) course, it flows into the Idrijca River.

Ljubevščica has several unnamed tributaries that originate under the slopes of Gore, Jelenji Vrh, Turn, Govekarjev Vrh, and Zagodov Vrh. Multiple tributaries form small waterfalls on their watercourse. Two sinkholes formed on the slopes of Jelični Vrh and are protected with the Natura 2000 program. Another sinkhole formed in the streambed under Kovačev Rovt.

Initially, Ljubevščica flows over marshy clastic rocks and weathered Anisian-Ladinian rocks, then over shallow-sea predominantly carbonate rocks, and in the lower part of the valley before the confluence, the stream flows over shallow-sea rocks and Carnian shallow-sea carbonates. Idrija Fault, the most pronounced geological fault in Slovenia, runs through the Ljubevščica Valley.

In 1961, the Idrija Fishing Society introduced brown trout (Salmo trutta) into the stream and established a breeding area within the watercourse. The valley is also home to the Orchis purpurea.

A dam was planned around 1580 for the needs of a water pump at the then newly built Barbara shaft of the Idrija mercury mine, but the building process was only accomplished by pumping master Hans Rath († 1591) in 1589, while the dam was completed in 1592 by Gregor Schmelzer. From the dam, the water flowed through a simple sand filter, and then through a 170 m-long (560 ft) wooden channel long to the shaft. The dam and canal no longer exist today. Two industrial waste disposal sites and a culturally protected homestead are located in Ljubevščica Valley. On its course, it flows through the urban district of Cegovnica, past the city cemetery and a commercial facility. Just before the confluence, it passes under the main road 102.
