= Zala (Idrijca) =

Stream in western Slovenia

Coordinates: 45°59′15″N 14°01′54″E

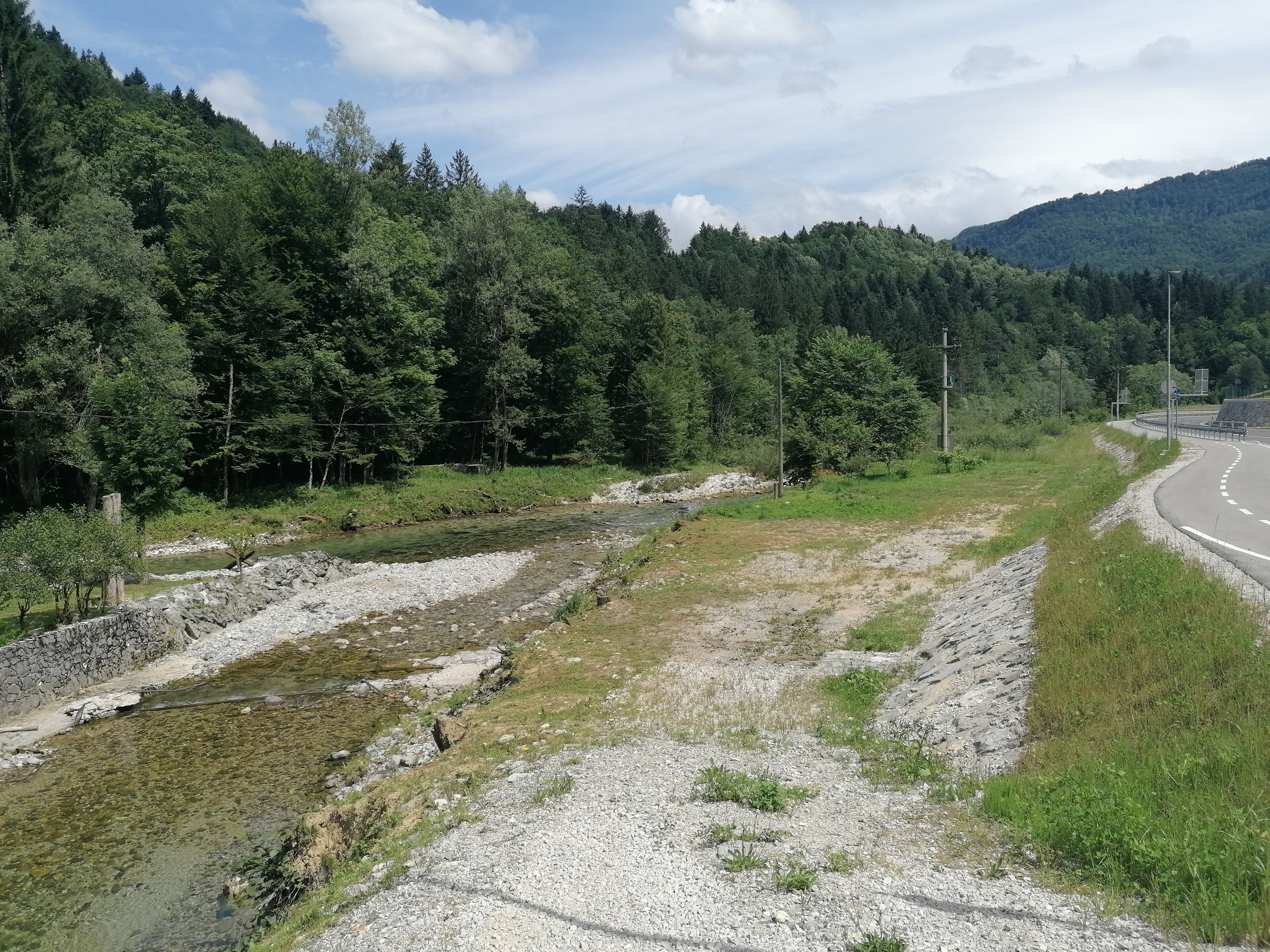
The Zala flowing into the Idrijca near Idrija

The Zala is a stream in western Slovenia and a right tributary of the Idrijca River. It originates in a basin below Jelični Vrh and Medvedje Brdo near Godovič, and it discharges into the Idrijca near the hamlet of Podroteja. For the last few kilometers before flowing into the Idrijca, it flows through a canyon made of Lower Cretaceous limestone. The stream is subparallel to the local Dinarid Zala tectonic fault, and they are geomorphologically connected. After peneplenization, Zala Canyon was created as a result of both raising of the surrounding terrain and the sudden deepening of the stream bed. It runs along the edge of the Trnovo Forest Plateau and Črni Vrh Plateau. Three kilometers (1.9 mi) before the confluence, Govekar Creek (Slovene: Govekarjeva grapa) ends in a waterfall flowing into the right side of Zala Canyon. There is a small cave on a slope below Big Peak (Slovene: Veliki vrh; elevation: 707 meters or 2,320 feet). Part of Route 102, the main road from Godovič to Spodnja Idrija, runs through the canyon. The hamlet of Baraka, part of Jelični Vrh, is located in the upper part of the Zala canyon near the location of the former Smrečne sluices.

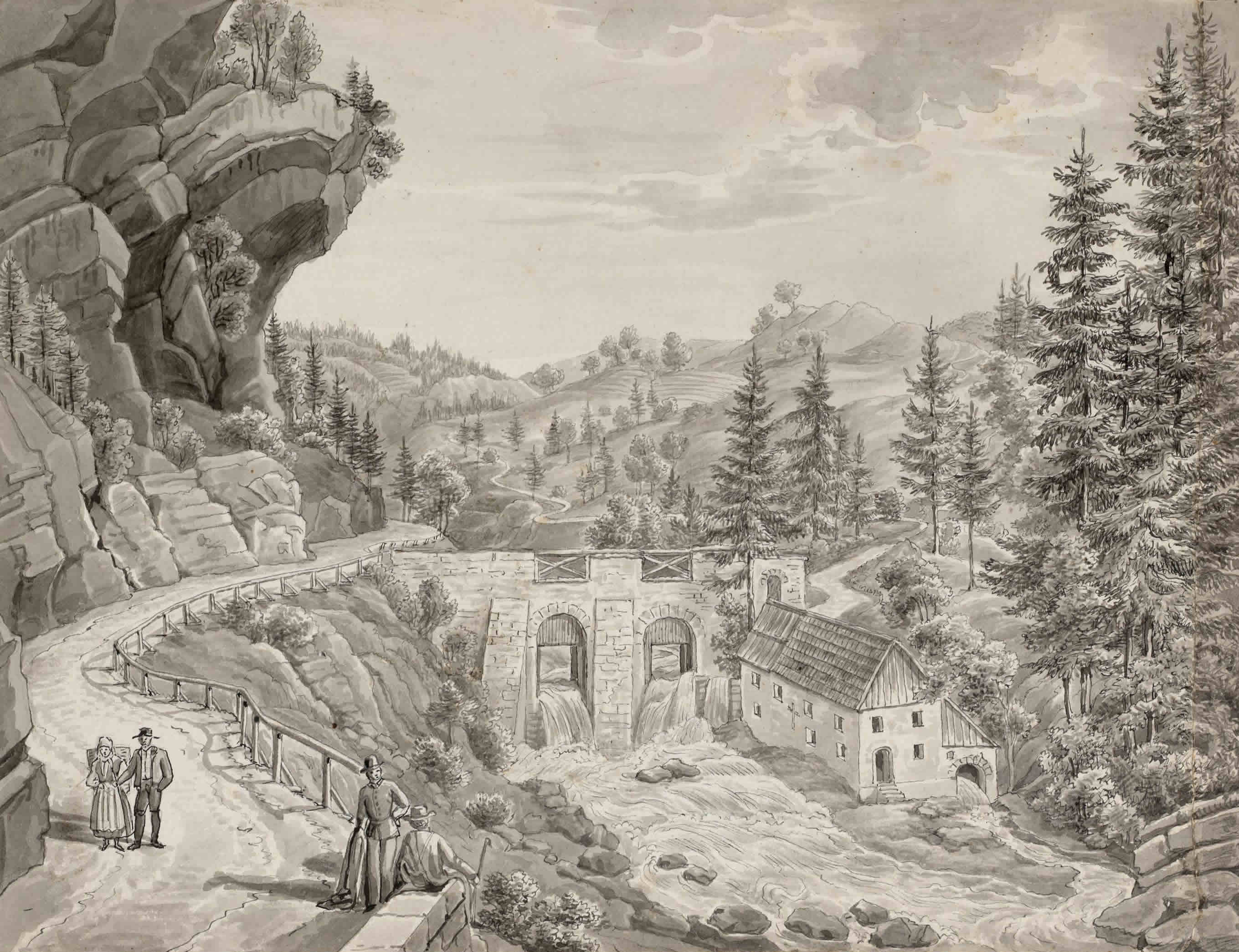
Smrečne logging sluices, c. 1850

The wooden Smrečne logging sluices were built in 1589 in Zala Canyon to supply timber to the nearby Idrija mercury mine, and in 1772 they were rebuilt using carved limestone. In 1859, the Smrečne logging sluices were abandoned due to the construction of the road from Idrija to Logatec. In contrast to the other logging sluices, they have not been restored to date. The sluices were 27.3 meters (90 ft) long and held up to 8,000 cubic meters (280,000 cu ft) of water.
