= Aleš Čar =

- Born: 6 March 1971; Idrija, Socialist Federal Republic of Yugoslavia (now in Slovenia)
- Occupations: Writer, editor, translator
- Writing career
- Notable works: Igra angelov in netopirjev, Pasji tango, V okvari, O znosnosti

Aleš Čar (born 6 March 1971) is a Slovene writer, editor and translator. He has published a number of novels and short stories. He works as editor in the culture section of the Slovene daily Dnevnik.

Čar was born in Idrija in the Goriška region in western Slovenia in 1971. He studied comparative literature and sociology at the University of Ljubljana and works as an editor in Ljubljana. For a while he was chief editor of the (now dormant) magazine Balkanis and hosted a talk show about the arts on Slovene national TV. In 1997 he won Best Debut Novel Award awarded by the Union of Slovenian Publishers and Booksellers for Igra angelov in netopirjev (When Bats Dance with Angels). His novel O znosnosti (On Tolerability) was one of the five finalists for the 2012 Kresnik Award.

== Published works ==
- Igra angelov in netopirjev (When Bats Dance with Angels), novel (1997)
- Pasji tango (Dog's Tango), novel (1999)
- V okvari (Out of Service), short stories (2003)
- Muhe (Flies), short stories (2006)
- Made in Slovenia, short stories (2007)
- O znosnosti (On Tolerability), novel (2011)
