= Jesenica, Cerkno =

Jesenica

- Location in Slovenia
- Coordinates: 46°9′0.51″N 13°57′4.06″E
- Country: Slovenia
- Traditional region: Littoral
- Statistical region: Gorizia
- Municipality: Cerkno

Area
  - Total: 3 km^{2} (1.2 sq mi)
- Elevation: 698.1 m (2,290 ft)

Population (2020)
  - Total: 74
  - Density: 25/km^{2} (64/sq mi)

Jesenica (pronounced [jɛsɛˈniːtsa]) is a settlement below Mount Kojca northwest of Cerkno in the traditional Littoral region of Slovenia.
