= Gewerkenegg Castle =

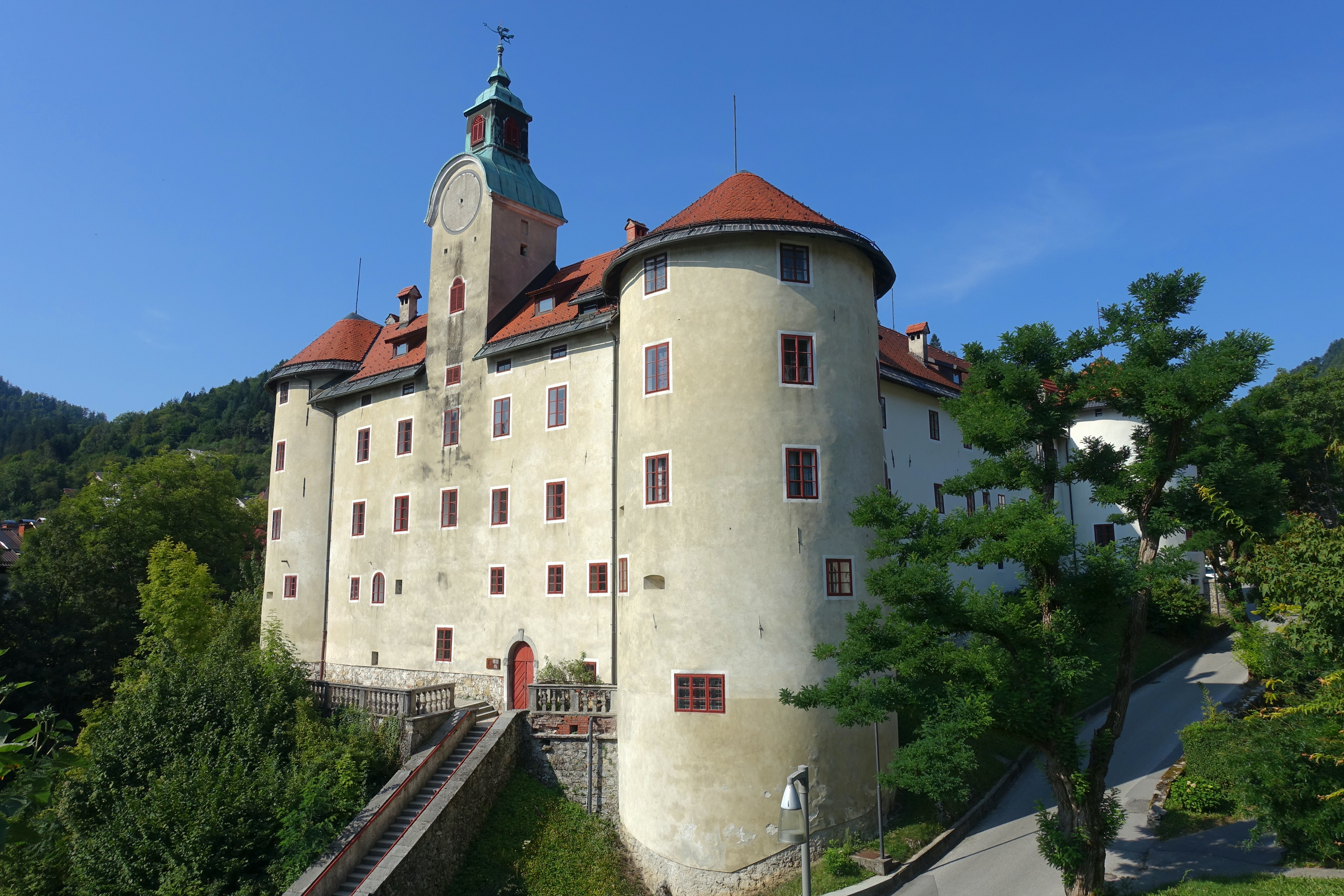

General information
- Location: Idrija, Slovenia
- Coordinates: 46.0007°N 14.0185°E
- Completed: 16th century

Gewerkenegg Castle (Slovene: Grad Gewerkenegg) is a castle in downtown Idrija, Slovenia. Originally built to support the mercury mine, it now facilitates the town's museum.

== History ==
With the discovery of mercury in Idrija at the end of the 15th century, mining-related activities soon began to predominantly shape the town and its surrounding areas. Gewerkenegg Castle was constructed between 1522 and 1533 by the mine owners in order to support the mining activities. Its name was derived from German to describe a 'mining castle'. Unlike most other castles from the same era, Gewerkenegg Castle never served feudal or military purposes, nor was used as a residence for nobility. Its primary role was to be a warehouse for storing the mined mercury and to provide office space for the mine administration. It served as a warehouse until a dedicated storage facility was built in the town at the end of the 18th century. Presently it is one of the oldest buildings in Idrija and it facilitates the municipal museum. The museum was opened in 1953 and spreads over almost 2,000 m^{2} of the castle interior.

== Location and structure ==
The castle is located on a small hill in the western side of the town. Its structure is roughly of a rectangular shape, with three defensive towers positioned in the north-west, north-east and south-east corners. The south side borders on a steep cliff adjacent to Nikova stream, therefore the south-east corner has no tower and is simply an enlarged section of joining walls. The corners are connected by walls that also contain the main rooms. A clock tower is located in the middle of the east wall. A small tributary stream of Nikova borders the north side of the castle. The castle has two entrances: the one on the east side is accessed by stairs and a bridge over the tributary stream, and the one on the west side is accessed from the road and leads directly into the courtyard.

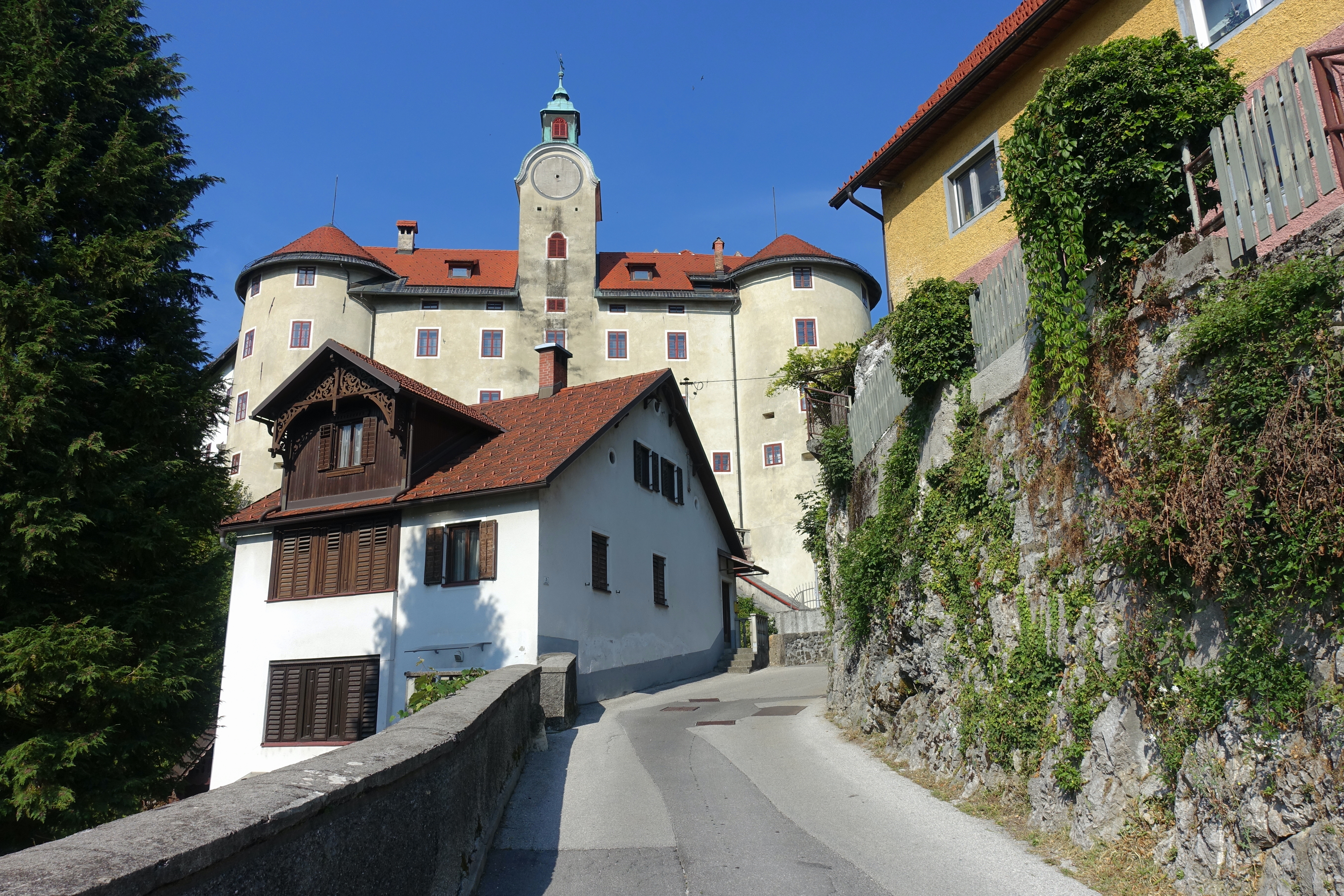
Access from the town center

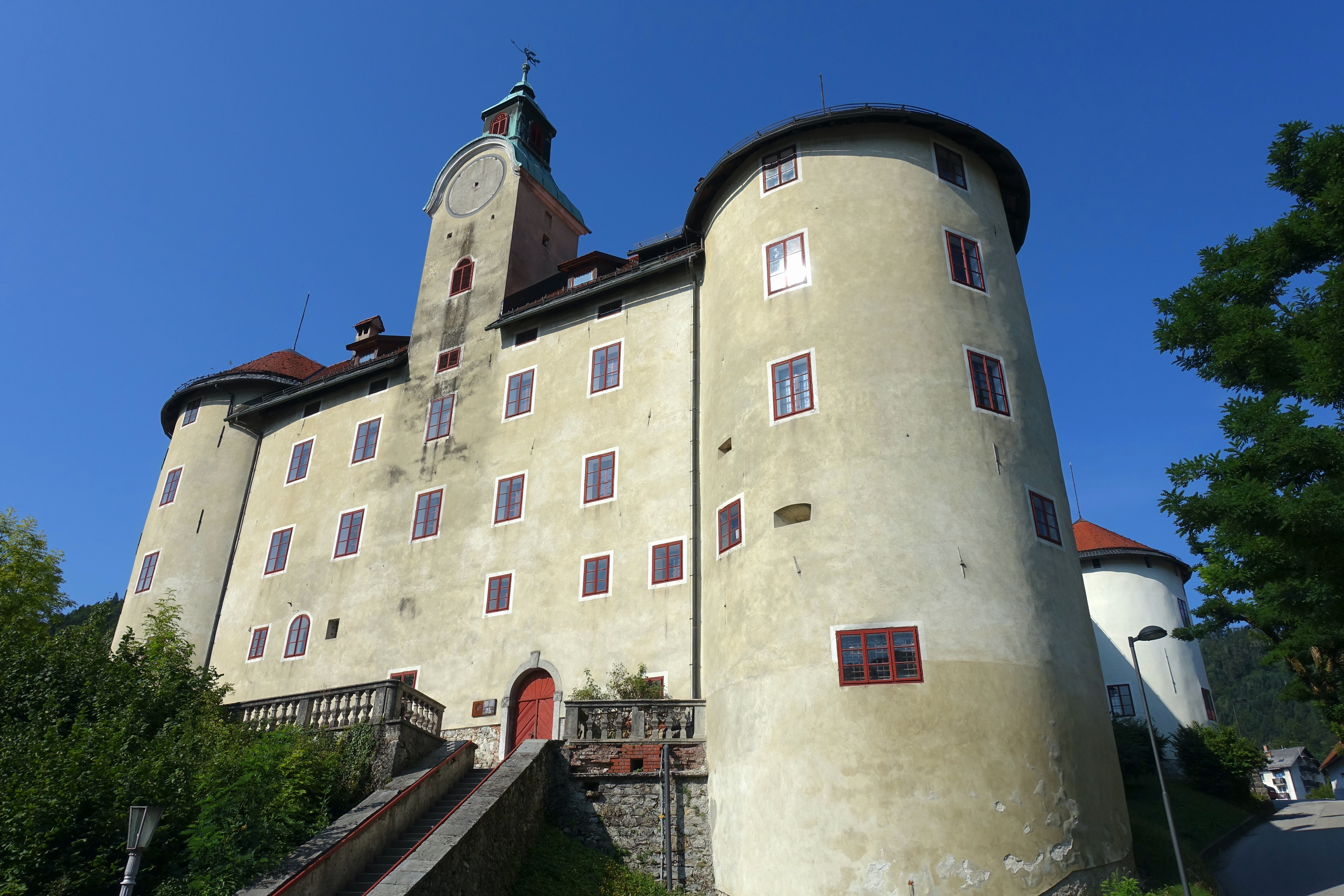
Entrance on the east side

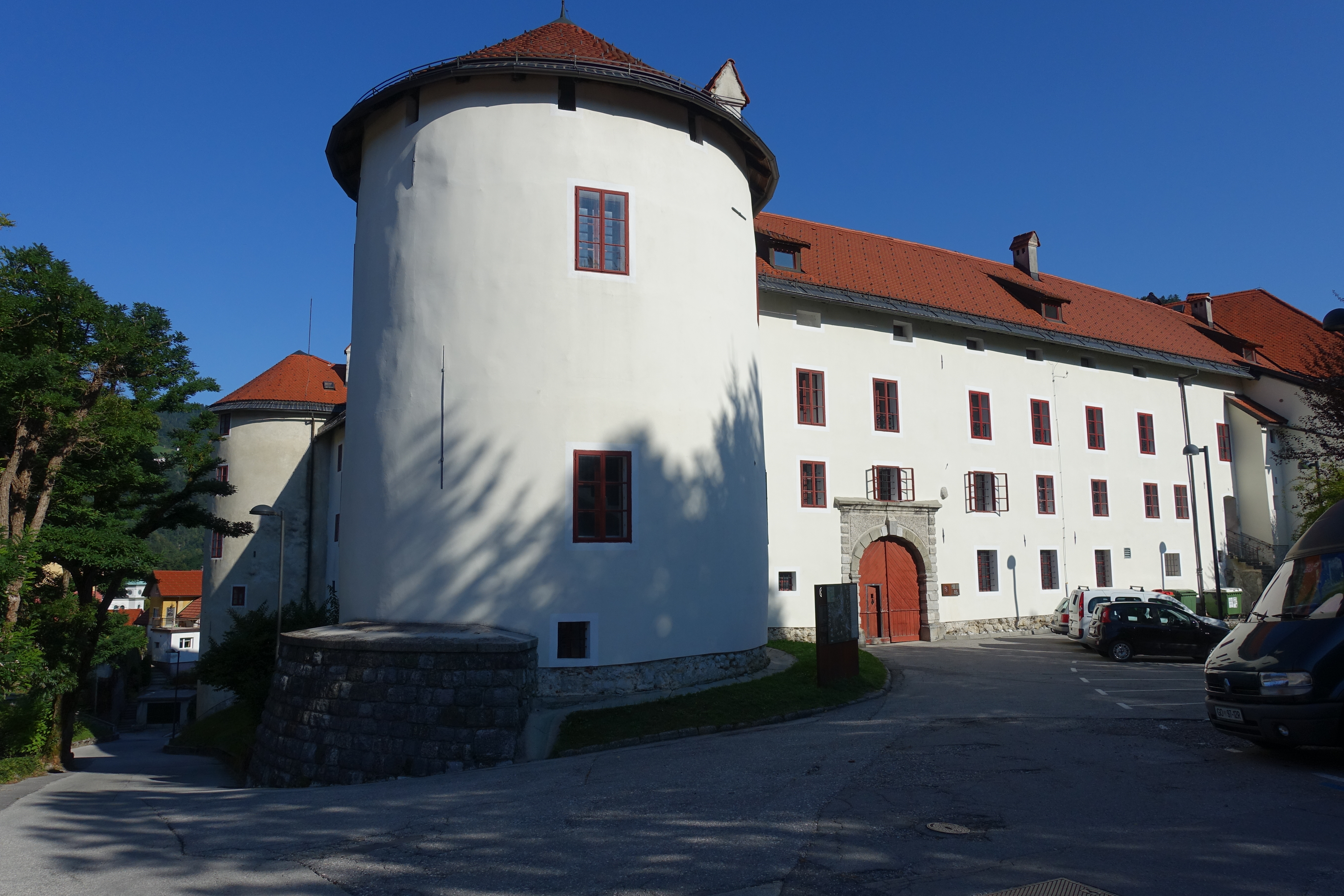
Entrance on the west side

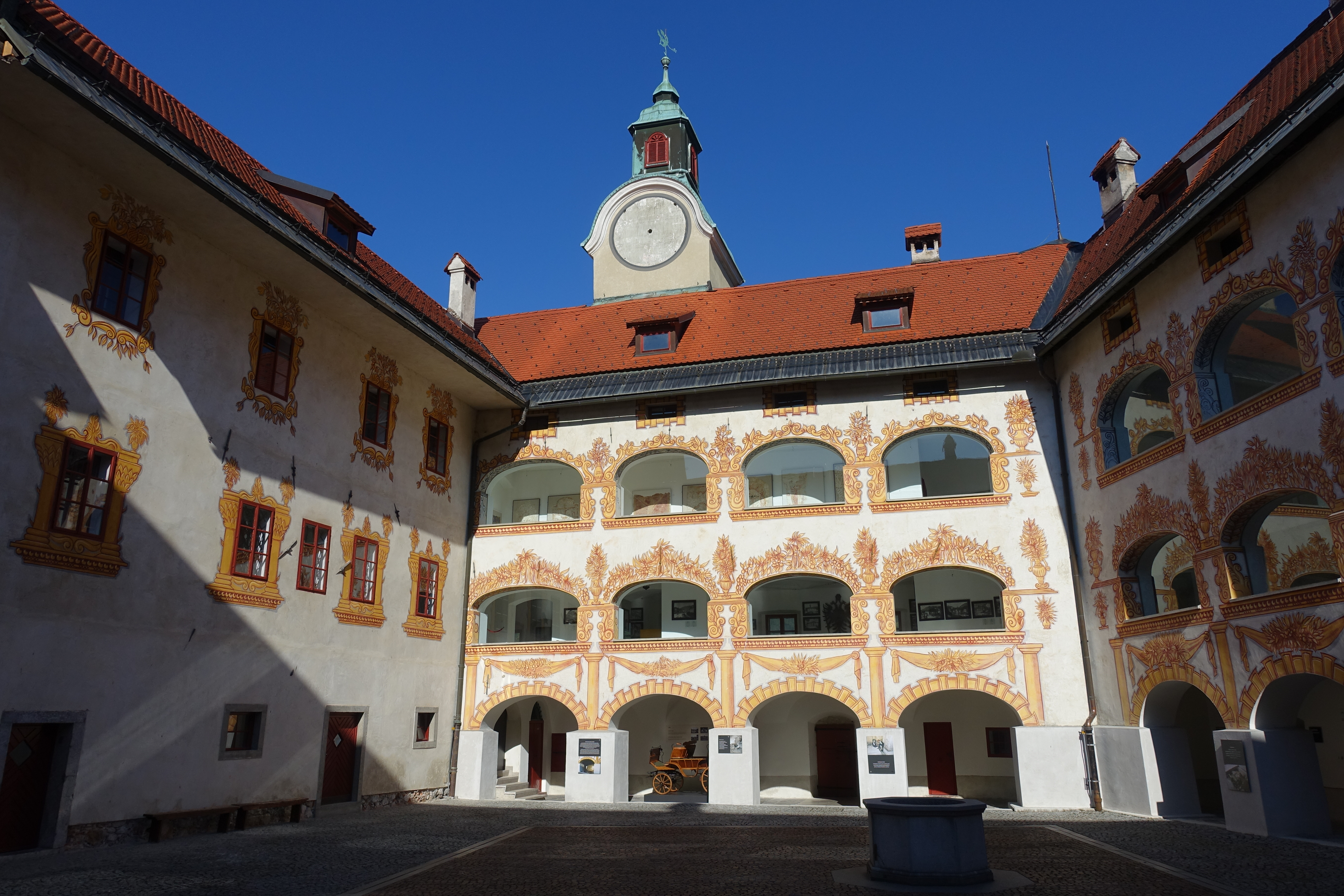
Castle courtyard

== Sources ==
- Kavčič, Janez (1993). "Pet stoletij rudnika živega srebra in mesta Idrije". Idrijska obzorja. Mestni muzej Idrija. pp. 15–25.
