= Kojca (mountain) =

Mountain in Slovenia

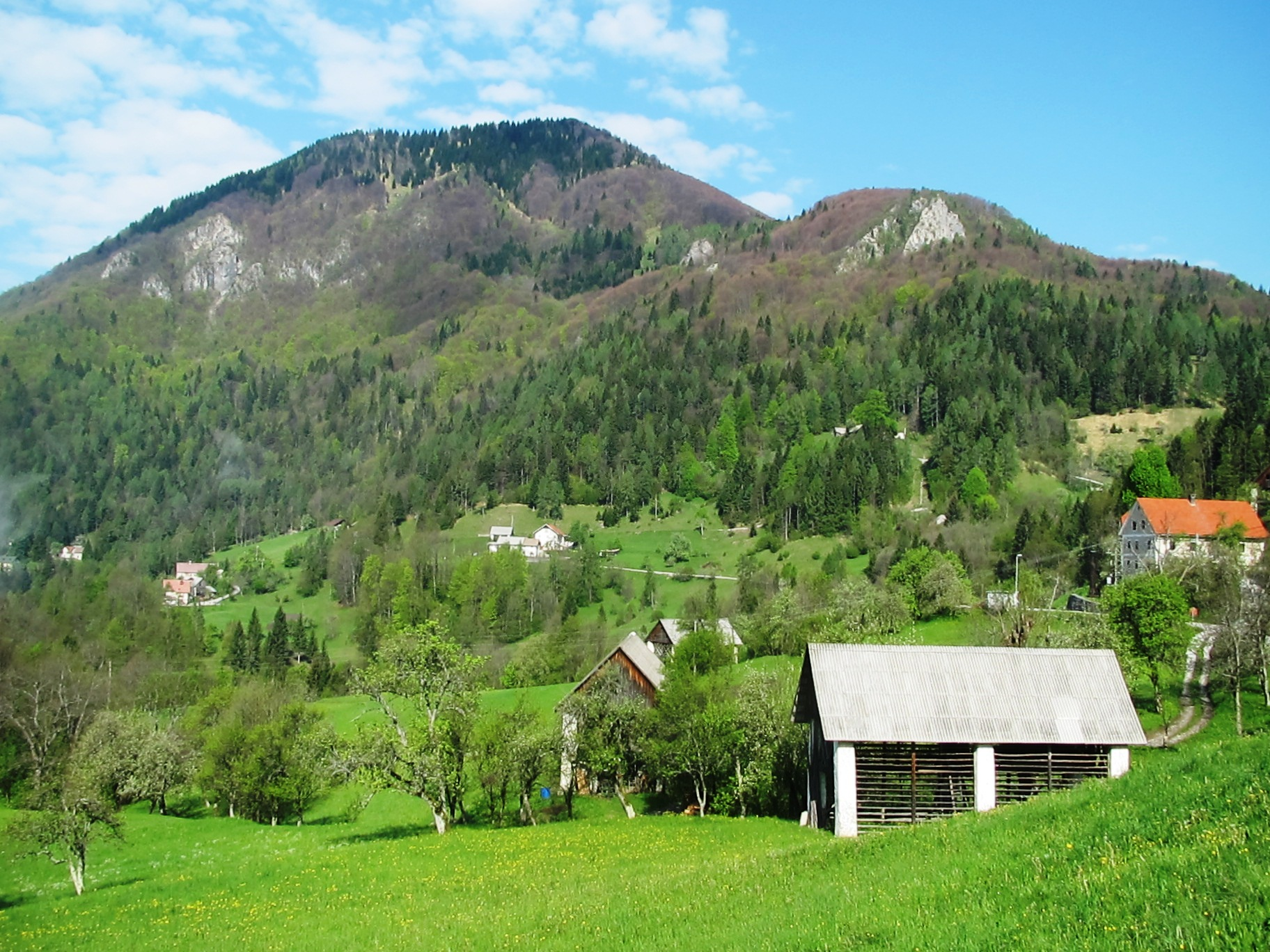
- Mount Kojca seen from Jesenica

Highest point
- Elevation: 1,303 m (4,275 ft)
- Coordinates: 46°09′11.03″N 13°55′39.31″E

Geography
- Location: Slovenia
- Parent range: Cerkno Hills

Mount Kojca (pronounced [ˈkoːi̯tsa]) is a 1,303-meter (4,275 ft) mountain in the Cerkno Hills in the municipality of Cerkno in western Slovenia. It stands south of Mount Porezen and its summit offers views of the Cerkno region and the surrounding peaks.

Mount Kojca shares its name with the hamlet of Kojca in Bukovo. The hamlet of Kojca is the oldest attested settlement below Mount Kojca and was formerly the seat of the local parish. In older sources Kojca is referred to as Kožica. The name of the hamlet is believed to derive from the mountain, presumably derived from koza, meaning 'goat', thus 'goat mountain'.

Below the southeast slope of Mount Kojca, in Ravne pri Cerknem, is Ravne Cave (Slovene: Ravenska jama), known for its aragonite helictites (or flos-ferri).
