= Idrija =

- Town
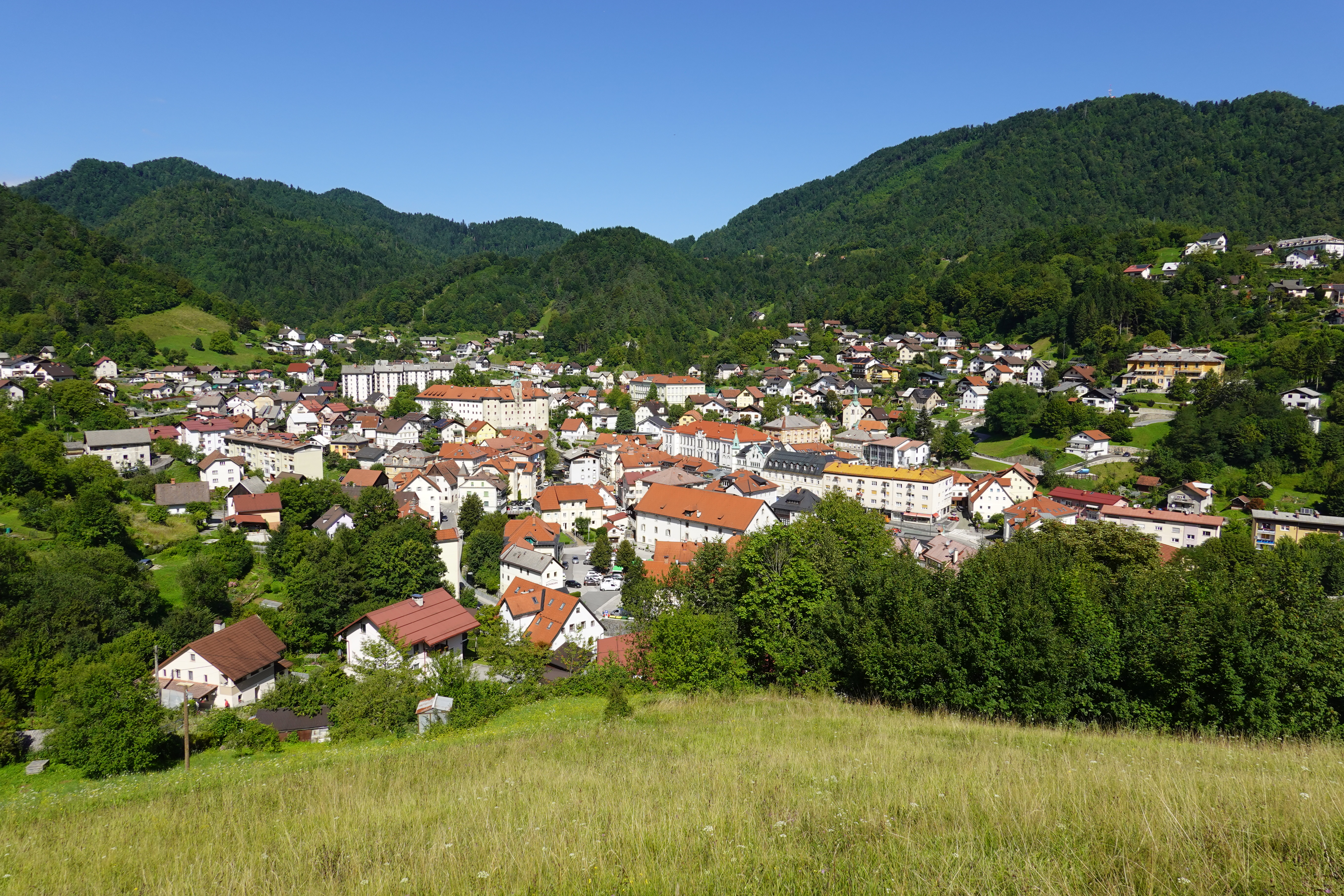
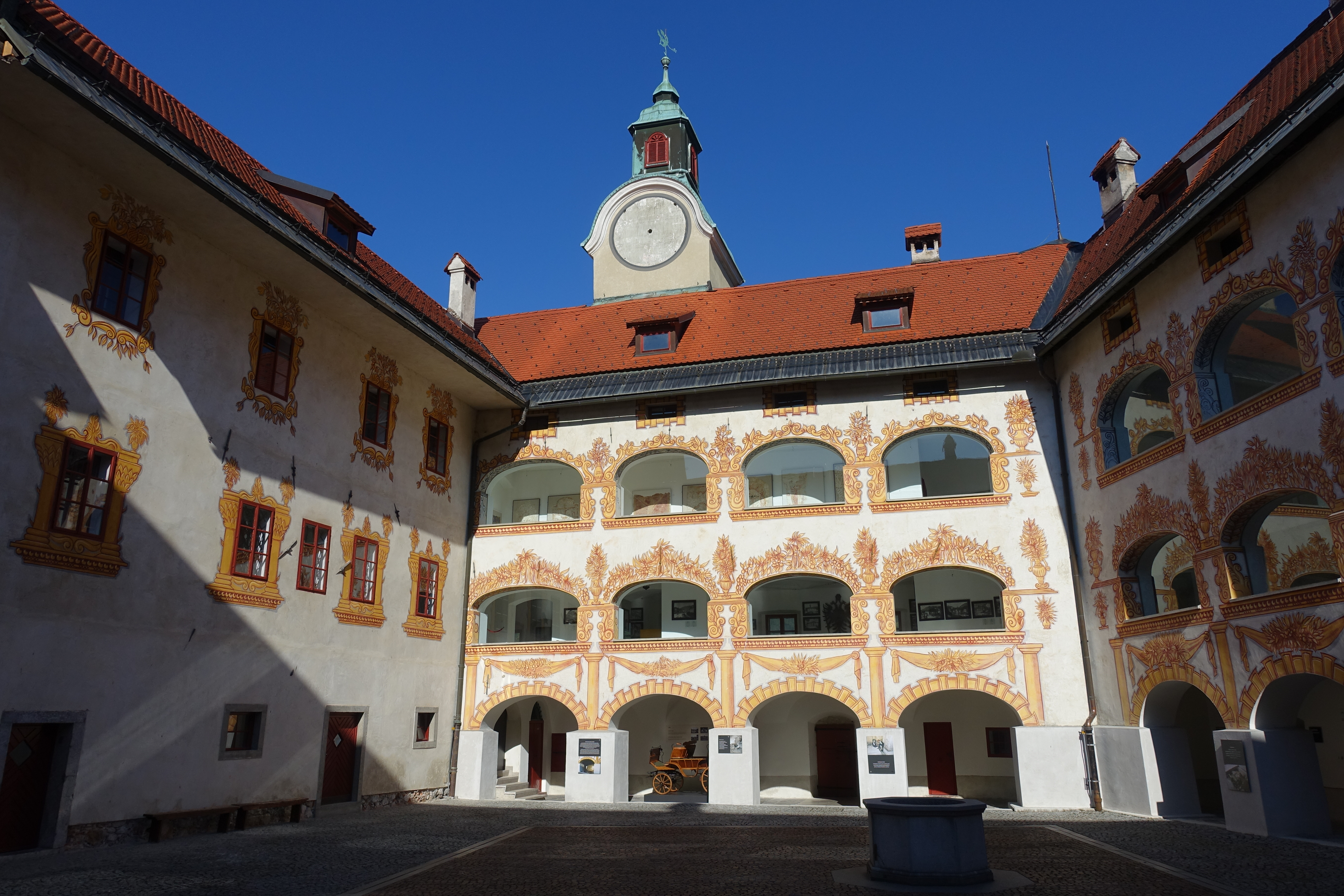
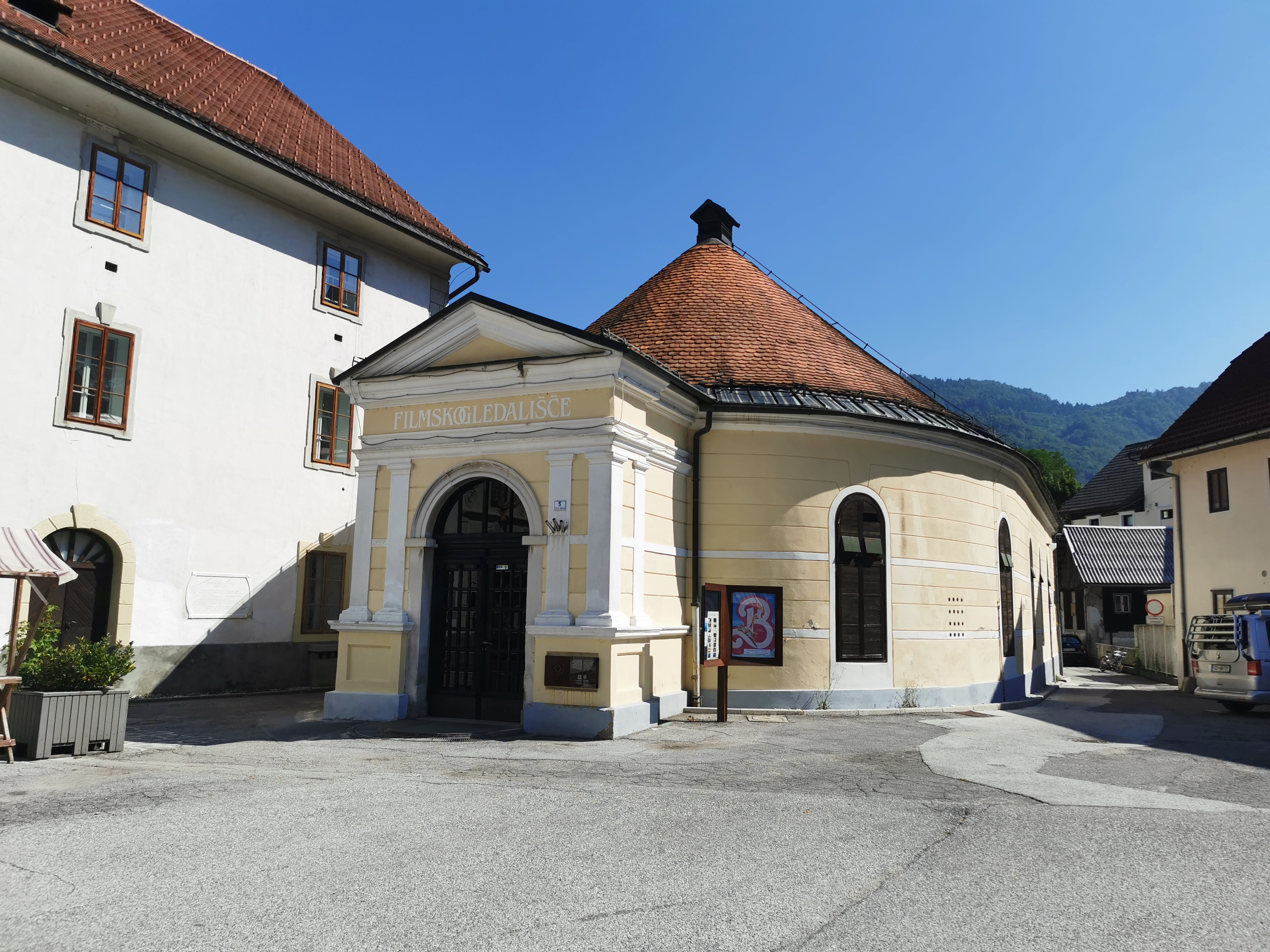
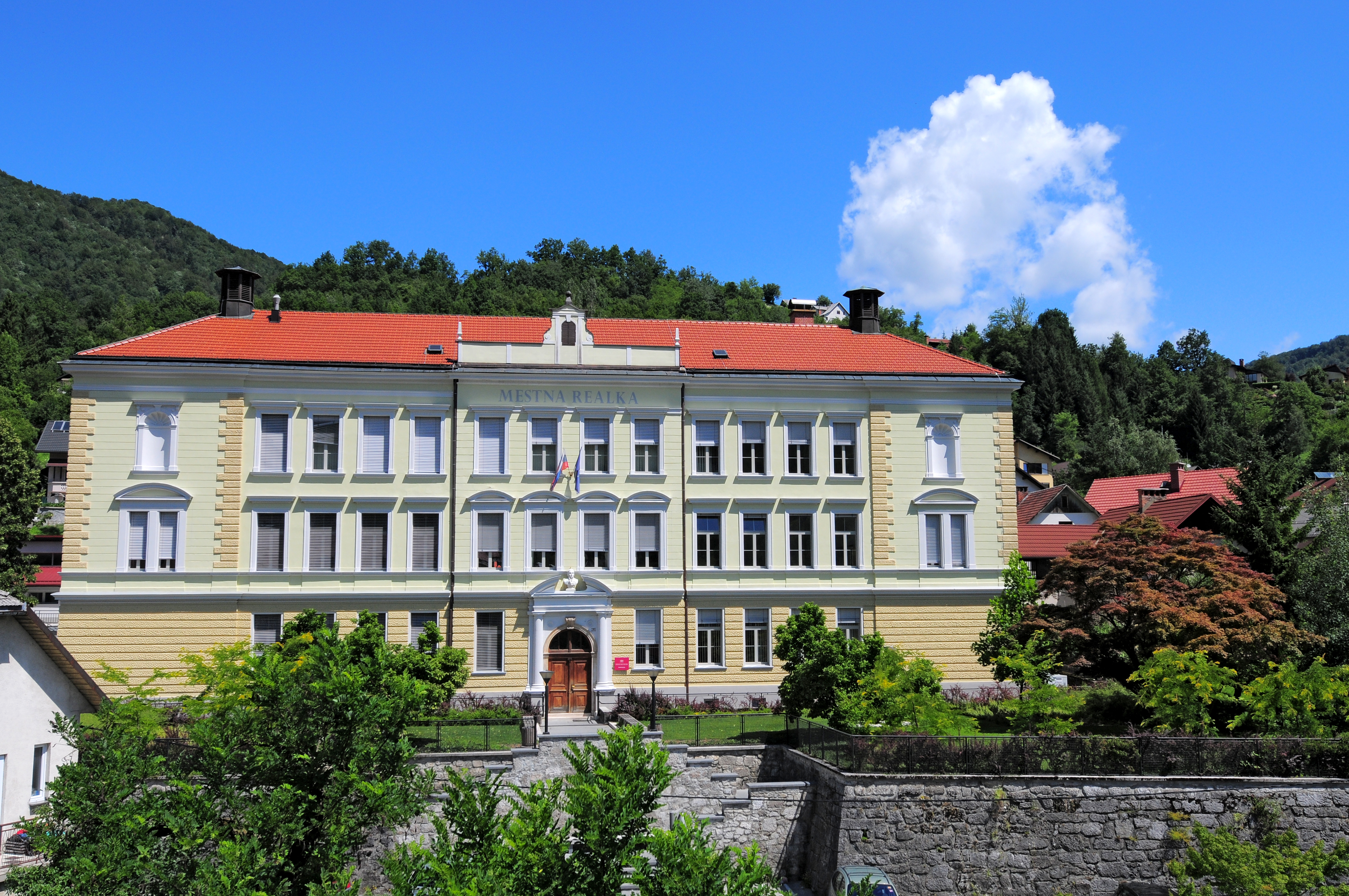
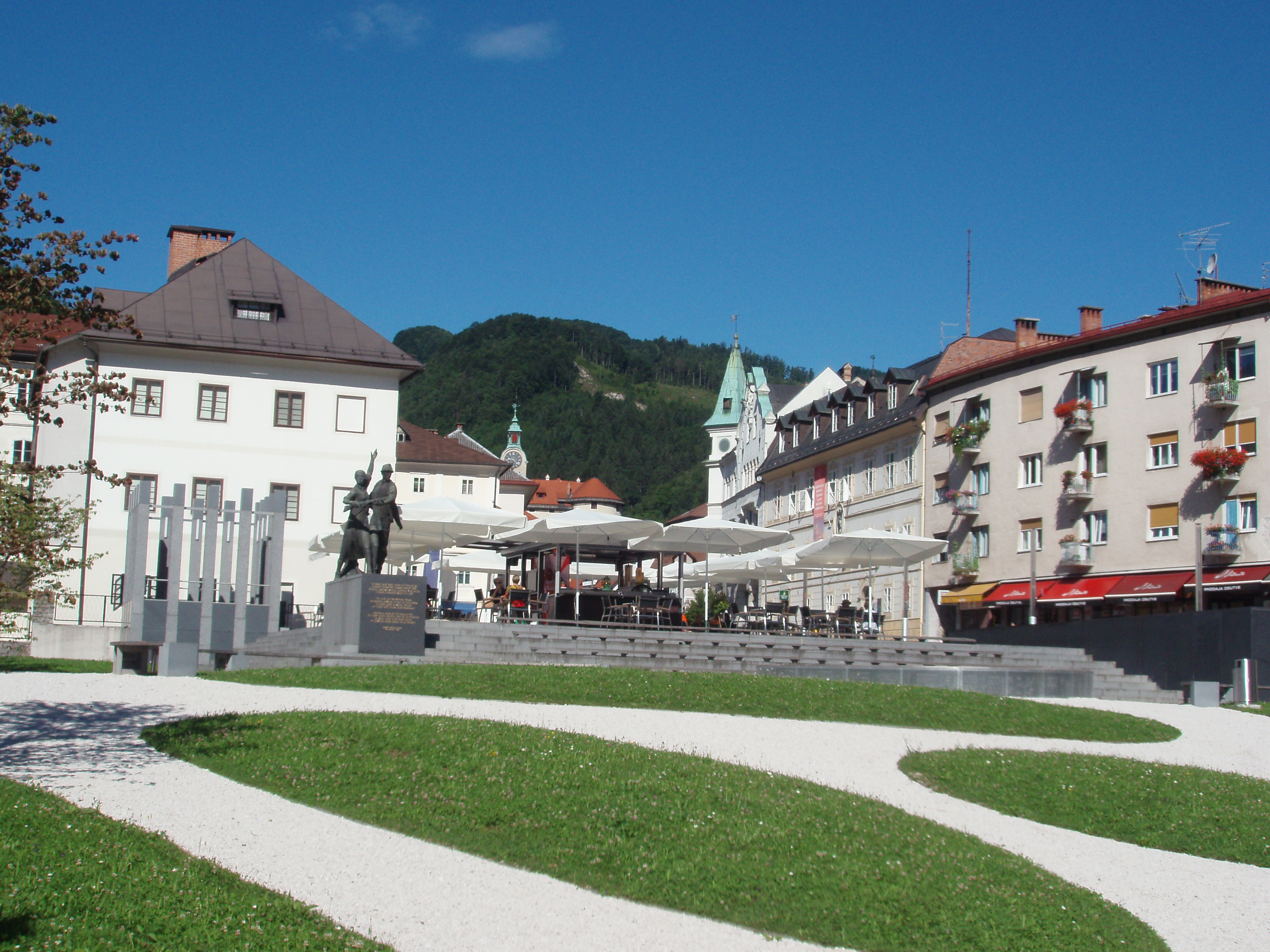
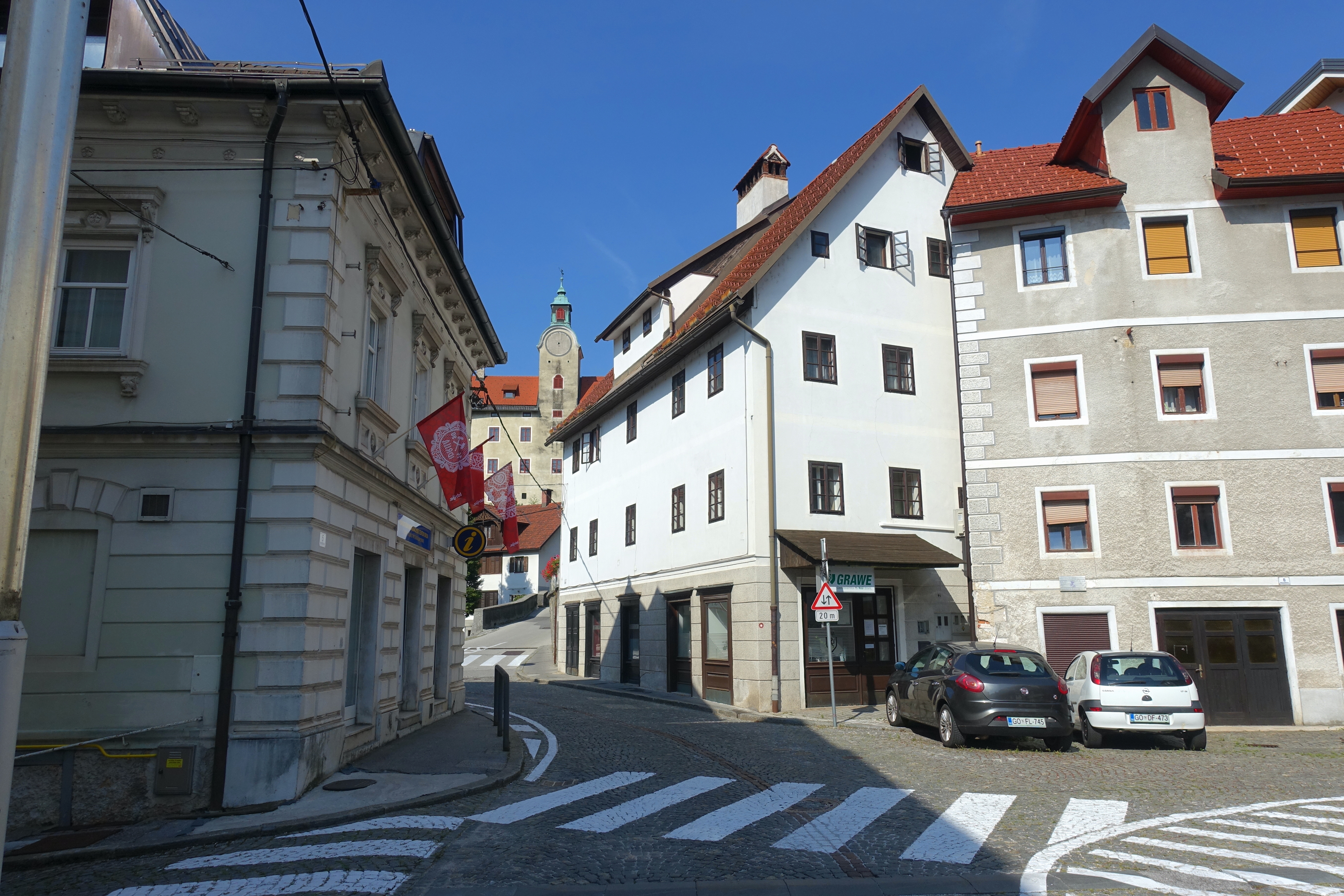
- From top, left to right: Overview of Idrija, Gewerkenegg Castle, Miners' Theatre, Vega Gymnasium, Town Park, Town Center

- Coat of arms

- Location in Slovenia
- Coordinates: 46°00′09″N 14°01′39″E
- Country: Slovenia
- Traditional region: Inner Carniola
- Statistical region: Gorizia
- Municipality: Idrija

Area
  - Total: 13.1 km^{2} (5.1 sq mi)
- Elevation: 334.5 m (1,097 ft)

Population (2025)
  - Total: 5,794
- Postal code: 5280 Idrija
- Vehicle registration: GO
- Climate: Cfb

UNESCO World Heritage Site
- Official name: Heritage of Mercury. Almadén and Idrija
- Type: Cultural
- Criteria: ii, iv
- Designated: 2012 (36th session)
- Reference no.: 1313
- Region: Europe and North America

Idrija (pronounced [ˈìːdɾija], in older sources Zgornja Idrija; German: (Ober)idria, Italian: Idria) is a town in western Slovenia. It is the seat of the Municipality of Idrija. It is notable for its mercury mine with stores and infrastructure, as well as miners' living quarters, and a miners' theatre. Together with the Spanish mine at Almadén, it has been a UNESCO World Heritage Site since 2012. Idrija is also known for Idrija Lace, a bobbin tape lace which is registered under protected geographical indication by the Slovenian Intellectual Property Office. In 2011, Idrija was given the Alpine Town of the Year award.

== Geography ==
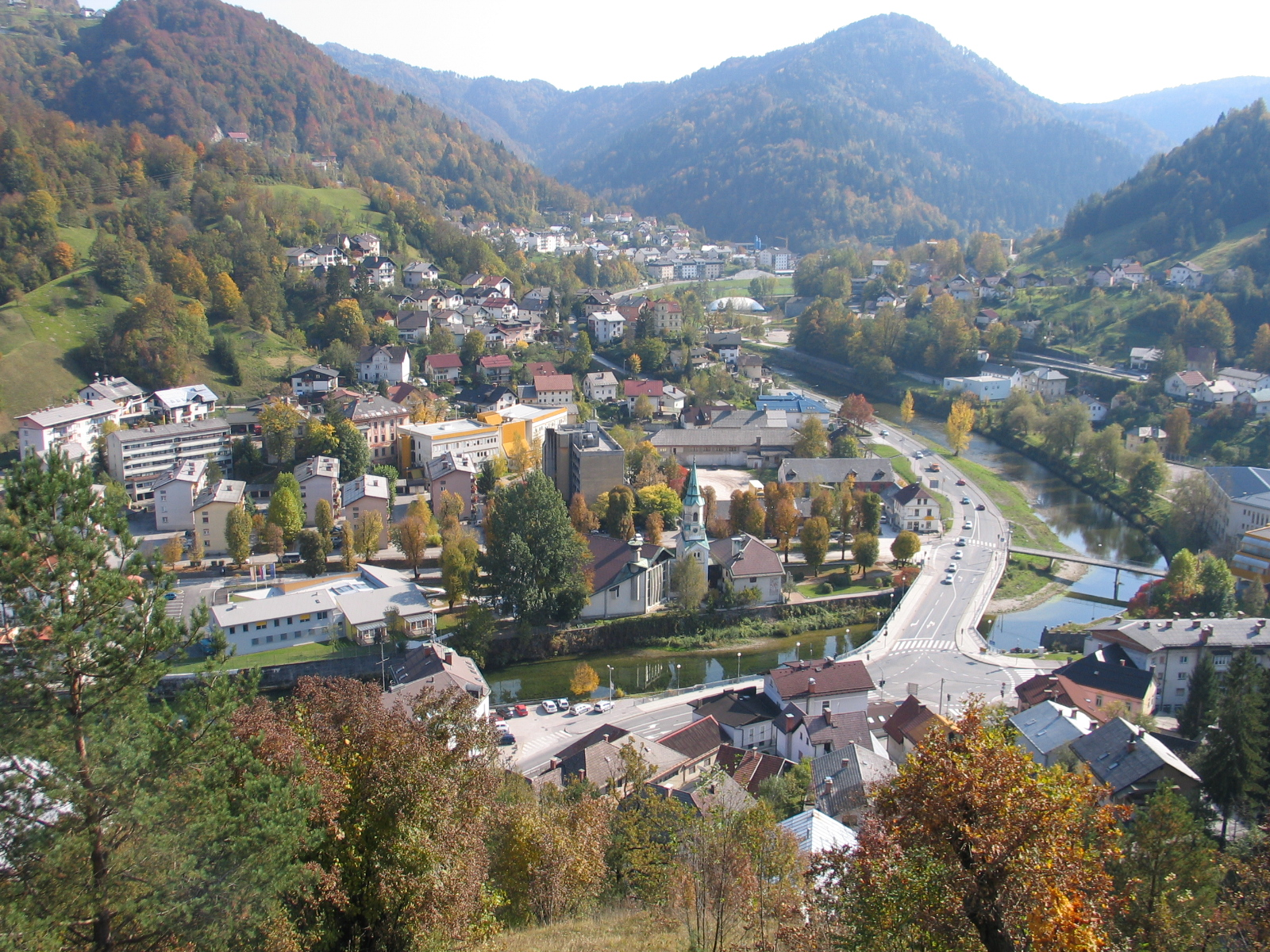
The Idrijca River seen from St. Anthony's Church

The town of Idrija lies in the Idrija Basin, surrounded by the Idrija Hills, in the traditional region of Inner Carniola and in the Gorizia Statistical Region. Today, its inhabitants mostly consider it part of the Slovene Littoral. It is traversed by the Idrijca River, which is joined there by Nikova Creek. It includes the neighborhoods of Brusovše, Cegovnica, Prenjuta, and Žabja Vas close to the town center, as well as the more outlying hamlets of Češnjice, Ljubevč, Marof, Mokraška Vas, Podroteja, Staje, and Zahoda. The Marof hydroelectric plant is located on the Idrijca River on the northern outskirts of Idrija, between Marof and Mokraška Vas. Springs in the area include Podroteja Spring and Wild Lake on the Idrijca River south of the town.

== History ==
In the Middle Ages, Idrija was managed by the Patriarchate of Aquileia and the Counts of Gorizia as part of the Governorate of Tolmin, which became independent in the 15th century. Mercury was discovered in Idrija (known as Idria under Austrian rule) in the late 15th century (various sources cite 1490, 1492, and 1497). After 1500, Idrija was occupied for one year by the Republic of Venice (in 1508), but it was otherwise governed by the House of Habsburg. In March 1511, it was affected by the forceful 1511 Idrija earthquake. To support the mining activities, Gewerkenegg Castle was constructed between 1522 and 1533 by the mine owners. Mining operations were taken over by the government in 1580.

In the 18th century, Idrija gained the rights of a market town. For long time Idrija was a cornerstone of the global supply of mercury. As such, Idrija supplied mercury needed in the silver mines of the Spanish Empire when the mercury mines of Almadén and Huancavelica faltered in their deliveries. From 1783 until the 1910s, Idrija was part of the Inner Carniola Kreis.

The mineral idrialite, discovered here in 1832, is named after the town.

By the late 19th-century, lace-making became an important source of international trade. The first lace shop in Idrija, was run by Karolina Lapajne in 1860, although the earliest written record of lace-making in Idrija dates back to 1696. In 1875, Franc Lapajne entered the lace market, which led to lace being exported across Europe and America. In 1876, Ivanka Ferjančič opened the Idrija Lace School to meet the demand for qualified lace makers.

By 1905, lace was being exported through the Idrija Lace Cooperative to Europe, America, and Egypt. During World War I, established lace trade links disappeared.

In 1920, Idrija came under Italy with the Treaty of Rapallo. In September 1943, it became part of the Nazi Germany and was then heavily rocketed by the SAAF in 1945. After the war, it formed part of the Socialist Republic of Slovenia within Yugoslavia and became a town in independent Slovenia in June 1991.

The Intellectual Property Office of the Republic of Slovenia granted the right to label lace with a geographical indication in 2000. In 2003, the Idrija Lacemakers Association was founded to preserve the art of lacemaking. In 2013, lacemaking in Idrija was added to the national list of intangible cultural heritage. In 2016, Slovenia declared lacemaking a living masterpiece of national importance. In 2018, lacemaking in Slovenia was declared on the UNESCO Representative List of the Intangible Cultural Heritage of Humanity.

Historical population
Year	Pop.	±%
1948	4,735	—
1953	5,013	+5.9%
1961	6,030	+20.3%
1971	6,933	+15.0%
1981	7,229	+4.3%
1991	6,195	−14.3%
2002	5,878	−5.1%
2011	5,955	+1.3%
2021	5,831	−2.1%
Population size may be affected by changes in administrative divisions.

=== Legend ===
According to legend, a bucket maker working in a local spring spotted a small amount of liquid mercury in 1490. Idrija is one of the few places in the world where mercury occurs in both its native state and as cinnabar (mercury sulfide) ore. The subterranean shaft mine entrance known as Anthony's Shaft (Antonijev rov) is used today for tours of the upper levels, complete with life-sized depictions of workers over the ages. The lower levels, which extend to almost 400 meters below the surface and are no longer being actively mined, are currently being cleaned up.

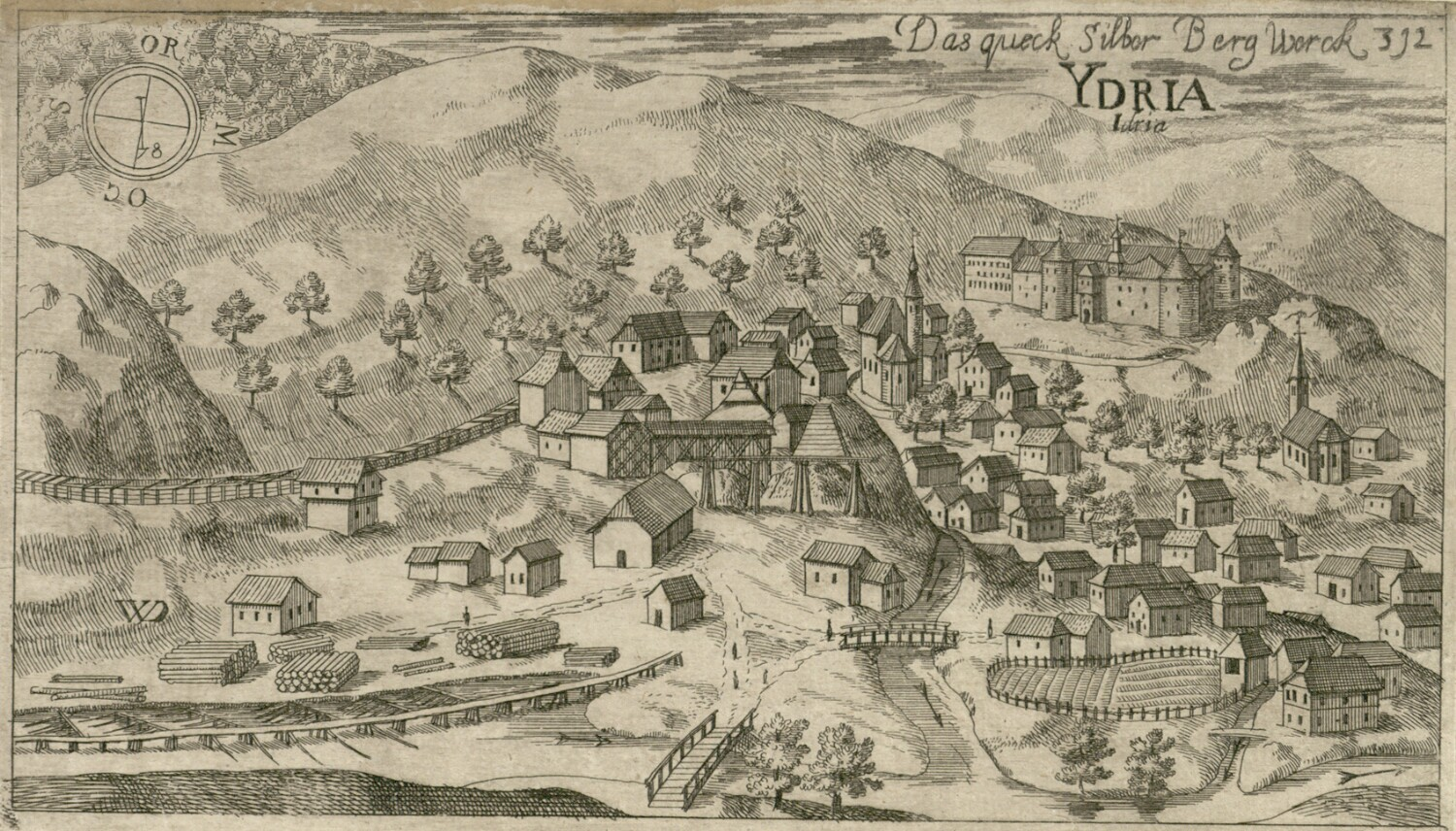
1679 engraving by Johann Weikhard von Valvasor

Anthony's Shaft, mine entrance

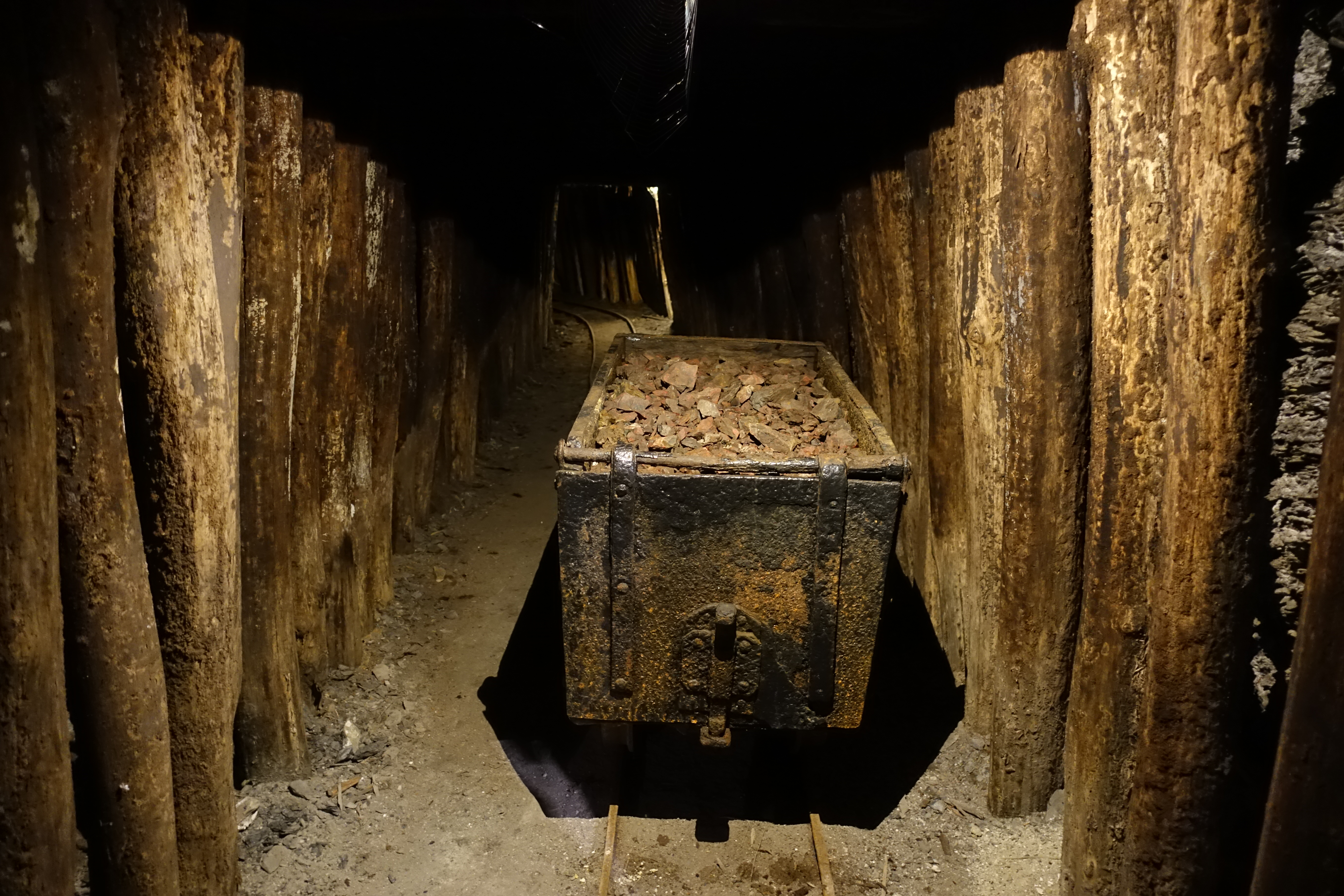
Inside the mine

Idrija mercury mine

== Church ==
The parish church in the town is dedicated to Saint Joseph the Worker and belongs to the Diocese of Koper. There are three other churches in Idrija, dedicated to the Holy Trinity, Saint Anthony of Padua, and Our Lady of Sorrows.

== Notable people ==
Notable people who were born or lived in Idrija include:

- Aleš Bebler (1907–1981), Slovene communist leader, resistance fighter, and diplomat
- Jožef Blasnik (1800–1872), printer, publisher
- Stanko Bloudek (1890–1959), designer
- Borut Božič (born 1980), professional road cyclist
- Aleš Čar (born 1971), writer
- Karl Deschmann (1821–1889), Carniolan politician and scholar
- Damir Feigel (1879–1959), writer, journalist, and anti-fascist
- Heinrich Freyer (1802–1866), botanist, cartographer, pharmacist, and natural scientist
- Ludvik Grilc (1851–1910), painter/portrait painter
- Belsazar Hacquet (1739/40–1815), French natural scientist
- Vladimír Karfík (1901–1996), Czech architect
- Eva Lucija Cecilija Viktorija Emilija Kraus, (1785–1845), Baroness of Wolsberg, lover of French Emperor Napoleon
- Marko V. Lipold (1816–1883), geologist and lawyer, father of Slovenian geology
- Joseph Mrakh (1709–1786), surveyor and cartographer
- Pier Paolo Pasolini (1922–1975), Italian film director and poet
- Leopoldina Pelhan (1880–1947), Slovenian bobbin-lace maker, teacher of bobbin lace making, draughtswoman and designer
- Vasja Pirc (1907–1980), chess grandmaster
- Nikolaj Pirnat (1903–1948), sculptor, painter, illustrator, and author
- Zorko Prelovec (1887–1939), musician, composer, choir composition author
- Marija Reven (1882 – after 1945), bobbin lacemaker teacher, draftswoman and designer
- Luka Rupnik (born 1993), basketball player
- Marko Ivan Rupnik (born 1954), artist, philosopher, and theologian
- Giovanni Antonio Scopoli (1723–1788), Italian natural scientist
- Jan Tratnik (born 1990), professional road cyclist
- Anton Aloys Wolf (1782–1859), Roman Catholic bishop, philanthropist, patron of literature

== See also ==
- The ghost town of New Idria, California, a site of mercury mining during the 19th-century California Gold Rush, was named after Idrija.
