= Idrijca =

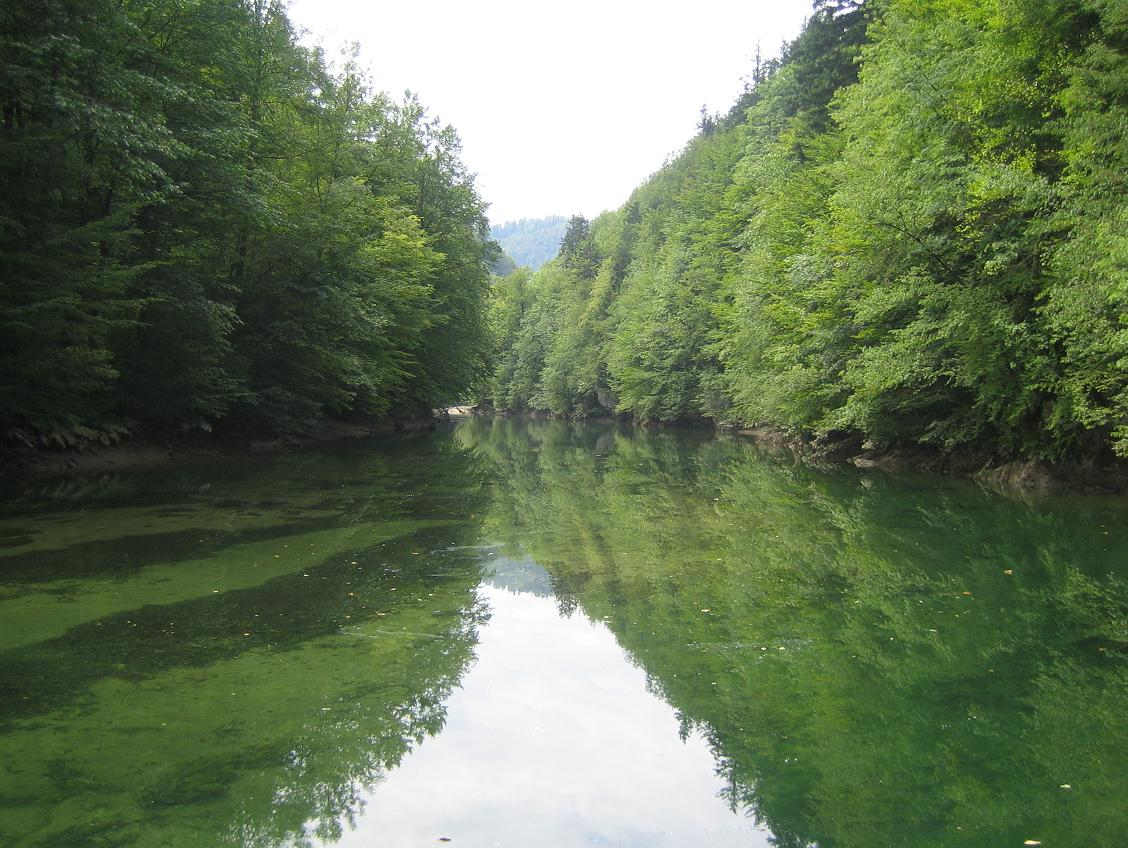
- The Idrijca near the Wild Lake

Location
- Country: Slovenia

Physical characteristics
- Mouth
  - location: Soča
  - coordinates: 46.1517°N 13.7404°E
- Length: 60 km (37 mi)
- Basin size: 598 km^{2} (231 sq mi)

Basin features
- Progression: Soča→ Adriatic Sea

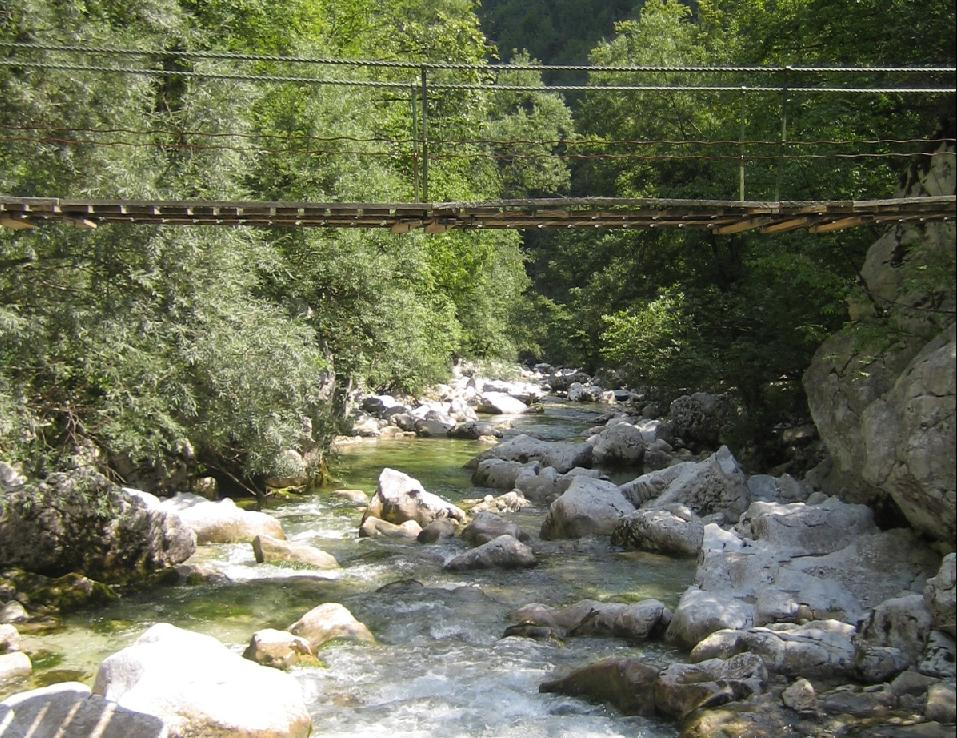
The upper Idrijca River

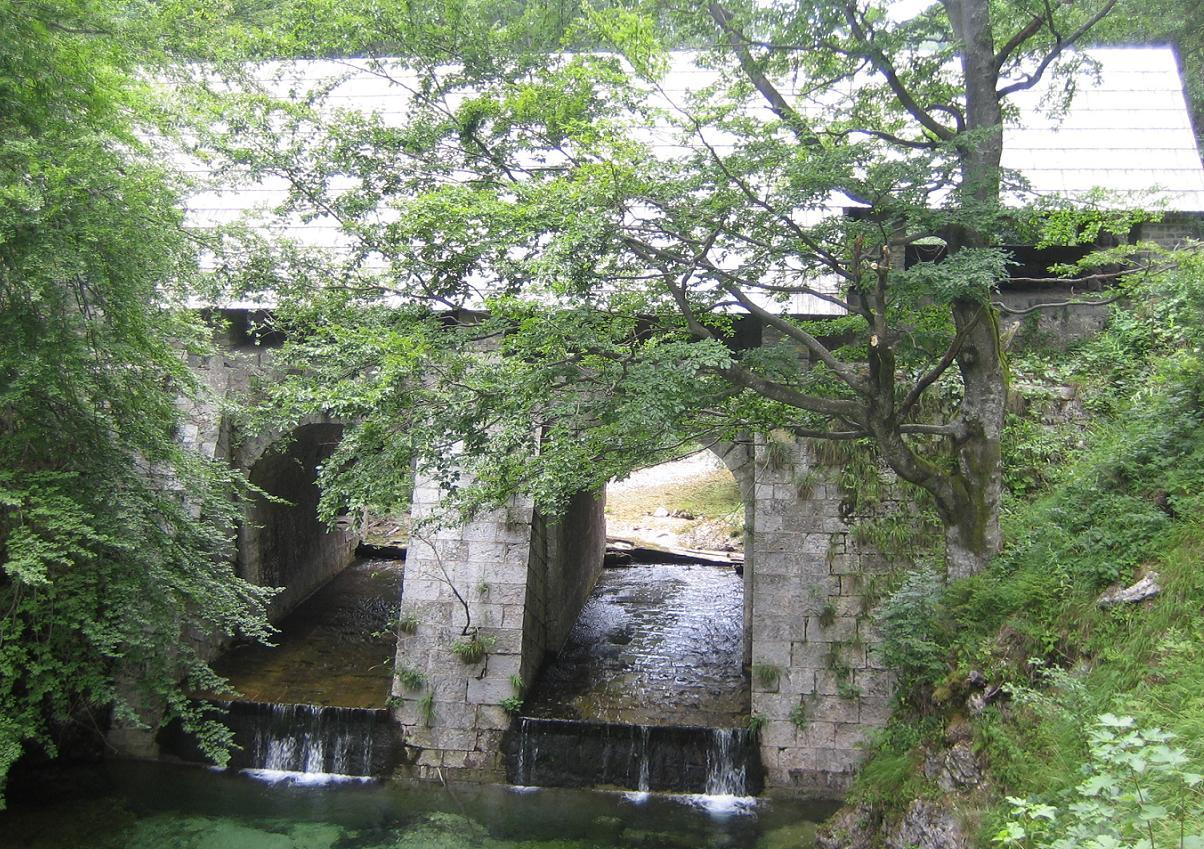
Logging sluice near Idrija

The Idrijca is a river flowing through the Idrija Hills and Cerkno Hills in Slovenia. It is 60 kilometres (37 mi) long. It rises near Vojsko, flows towards northeast and after passing through Idrija turns to the northwest. After passing through Spodnja Idrija and Cerkno it joins the Soča in Most na Soči. It has a pluvio-nival regime and belongs to the Adriatic Sea Basin.

== Hydrogeochemical features ==
The Idrijca drains a 624 km^{2} basin on the southwestern flank of the Julian Alps. It rises on the Vojsko Plateau (Slovene: Vojskarska planota) at about 924 m ASL and flows northeast through Idrija before turning northwest toward its confluence with the Soča at Most na Soči. Owing to exceptionally high precipitation (2,400–5,200 mm per year) on the windward slopes of the Alps and seasonal snowmelt, the Idrijca exhibits a pluvio-nival discharge regime: streamflow peaks occur in November (rain plus snowmelt) and again in April, with sustained low flows in summer. Mean long-term discharge at the Hotešk gauge is 33.6 cubic metres per second (m^{3}/s), ranging seasonally from 3.4–8.5 m^{3}/s at the low end to 113–644 m^{3}/s at the high end.

Beneath its course the Idrijca traverses a complex bedrock sequence. The upper reaches cut through solid and bedded Triassic limestone and dolomite; the central valley is underlain by Permian greywacke, conglomerate, and red sandstones; and the lower reaches pass over Triassic dolomite interbedded with marls and Cretaceous limestone breccia. This geology governs the river's chemistry: waters are of the HCO₃⁻–Ca²⁺–Mg²⁺ type, with Ca²⁺/Mg²⁺ molar ratios indicating dominant dolomite weathering, and total alkalinity typically 3.9–5.1 mM. Field pH values range from 7.7 to 8.8, and saturation indices show persistent oversaturation with respect to calcite and dolomite, so the Idrijca both dissolves and reprecipitates carbonate minerals along its course.

Isotopic and mass balance studies demonstrate that carbonate dissolution is the principal source of dissolved inorganic carbon (DIC) in the river, supplemented by inputs of soil-derived CO_{2} and organic-matter decomposition in spring, and offset by CO_{2} outgassing to the atmosphere. Partial pressures of CO_{2} in the water may rise to 13 times atmospheric, making the Idrijca a net CO_{2} emitter. Together, these hydrogeochemical characteristics highlight the tight coupling between the basin's geology, climate and biogeochemical processes in shaping both the flow regime and water chemistry of the Idrijca.

== Tributaries ==
- Senčni potok
- Nikova
- Kanomljica
- Otuška
- Sevnica
- Trebuščica
- Hotenja
- Črni potok
- Belca
- Zala
- Ljubevščica
- Zaspana grapa
- Skavnica
- Peklenska graba
- Grda grapa
- Luknjica
- Zaganjalčnica
- Cerknica
- Jesenica
- Bukovška grapa
- Žibernik
- Doberšček
- Bača
