= List of ski areas and resorts in Slovenia =

This is a list of ski areas and resorts in Slovenia.

== Map ==
large ski resorts medium ski resorts small ski resorts

Mariborsko Pohorje (325–1327 m)	Kanin–Sella Nevea (1140–2300 m)	Krvavec (1480–1971 m)	Vogel (560–1800 m)
41.5 km	30 km	29 km	22 km
Kranjska Gora (810–1295 m)	Cerkno (935–1287 m)	Rogla (1050–1517 m)	Golte (1407–1573 m)
20 km	18 km	13.5 km	12.8 km
List of ski areas and resorts in Slovenia (Slovenia)
Stari Vrh (580–1217 m)	Kope (1010–1542 m)	Gače (700–965 m)	Javornik (800–1200 m)
12 km	8 km	7 km	7 km
Soriška Planina (1307–1550 m)	Velika Planina (1412–1666 m)	Ribniška koča (1368–1525 m)	Straža Bled (503–634 m)
7 km	3 km	2.3 km	1.4 km

== By size ==
=== Large ===
Between 12 and 42 kilometers of slopes.

Resort	Total	Municipality	Bottom	Top	Region	Lifts^{1}	Mountain range	Year	Web
Mariborsko Pohorje	41.5 km	MB / Ruše / Hoče–Slivnica	325 m	1327 m	Styria	22	Pohorje	1957	(Note: Mariborsko Pohorje / Snežni stadion (lower section) – Bolfenk (midsection) – Areh (upper section))
Kanin–Sella Nevea	30 km	Bovec / Chiusaforte	1140 m	2300 m	Slovene Littoral	12	Julian Alps	1973	
Krvavec	29 km	Cerklje na Gorenjskem	1480 m	1971 m	Upper Carniola	11	Kamnik–Savinja Alps	1958	
Vogel	22 km	Bohinj	560 m	1800 m	Upper Carniola	9	Julian Alps	1964	
Kranjska Gora	20 km	Kranjska Gora	810 m	1295 m	Upper Carniola	18	Vitranc	1948	(Note: Kranjska Gora / Kranjska Gora (main section) – Podkoren (midsection) – Planica (west section))
Cerkno	18 km	Cerkno	935 m	1287 m	Slovene Littoral	8	Cerkno Hills	1982	
Rogla	13.5 km	Zreče	1050 m	1517 m	Styria	13	Pohorje	1975	
Golte	12.8 km	Mozirje	1407 m	1573 m	Styria	7	Kamnik–Savinja Alps	1969	
Stari Vrh	12 km	Gorenja Vas–Poljane	580 m	1217 m	Upper Carniola	6	Škofja Loka Hills	1970	

=== Medium ===
Between 3 and 8 kilometers of slopes.

Resort	Total	Municipality	Bottom	Top	Region	Lifts^{1}	Mountain range	Year	Web
Kope	8 km	Slovenj Gradec	1010 m	1542 m	Styria	8	Pohorje	19xx	
Gače	8 km	Semič	700 m	965 m	Lower Carniola	7	Pogorelec	19xx	
Javornik	7 km	Idrija	800 m	1200 m	Slovene Littoral	4	Trnovo Forest Plateau	1995	
Soriška Planina	7 km	Železniki	1307 m	1550 m	Upper Carniola	5	Škofja Loka Hills	19xx	
Marela	3.2 km	Zagorje ob Savi	420 m	900 m	Upper Carniola	4	Jablanški vrh	19xx	
Velika Planina	3 km	Kamnik	1412 m	1666 m	Upper Carniola	4	Kamnik–Savinja Alps	1964	
Trije kralji	3 km	Slovenska Bistrica	1200 m	1347 m	Styria	2	Pohorje	19xx	
Črna na Koroškem	3 km	Črna na Koroškem	575 m	789 m	Carinthia	1	Pohorje	19xx	

=== Small ===
Less than 3 kilometers of slopes.

Resort	Total	Municipality	Bottom	Top	Region	Lifts^{1}	Mountain range	Year	Web
Ribniška koča	2.3 km	Ribnica na Pohorju	1368 m	1525 m	Styria	2	Pohorje	19xx	
Ribnica na Pohorju	2.2 km	Ribnica na Pohorju	715 m	921 m	Styria	4	Pohorje	19xx	
Španov vrh	2 km	Jesenice	981 m	1361 m	Upper Carniola	1	Karawanks	1964	
Senožeta	2 km	Bohinj	580 m	720 m	Upper Carniola	2	Julian Alps	19xx	
Prvine (above Trojane)	2 km	Lukovica	___ m	___ m	Upper Carniola	1	Čemšeniška planina	19xx	
Poseka	1.7 km	Ravne na Koroškem	432 m	587 m	Carinthia	1	Smrekovec Mountains	19xx	
Macesnovec	1.45 km	Kranjska Gora	865 m	1182 m	Upper Carniola	3	Planica	2006	
Straža Bled	1.4 km	Bled	503 m	634 m	Upper Carniola	3	Straža Hill	1954	
Sviščaki	1.3 km	Ilirska Bistrica	1210 m	1335 m	Inner Carniola	3	Snežnik	19xx	
Celjska koča	1.2 km	Celje	650 m	834 m	Styria	3	Sava Hills	19xx	
Pokljuka–Viševnik	1.2 km	Železniki	1371 m	1575 m	Upper Carniola	5	Julian Alps	19xx	(Note: Consists of 3 smaller ski resorts: Pokljuka–Viševnik / Jelka / Hotel Šport)
Bukovnik	1.1 km	Dravograd	500 m	625 m	Carinthia	1	Selovec	19xx	
Dole pri Litiji	1 km	Litija	625 m	675 m	Styria	1	Sava Hills	19xx	
Brezovica–Kamna Gorica	0.9 km	Radovljica	485 m	600 m	Upper Carniola	1	Jelovica	19xx	
Mojstrana	0.8 km	Kranjska Gora	550 m	800 m	Upper Carniola	1	Julian Alps	19xx	
Medvednica	0.8 km	Trbovlje	885 m	___ m	Styria	1	Medvednica	19xx	
Kal nad Kanalom	0.72 km	Kanal ob Soči	770 m	___ m	Slovene Littoral	1	Banjšice Plateau	1973	
Rimski vrelec–Kotlje	0.7 km	Ravne na Koroškem	487 m	558 m	Carinthia	2	Mount St. Ursula	19xx	
Trotovnik	0.7 km	Trbovlje	700 m	820 m	Lower Carniola	2	Sava Hills	1972	
Ložekar	0.65 km	Solčava	1150 m	1250 m	Styria	2	Kamnik–Savinja Alps	1993	
Globoki klanec	0.52 km	Sveti Tomaž	___ m	___ m	Styria	1	Slovenske Gorice	1997	
Lokve	0.5 km	Nova Gorica	930 m	___ m	Slovene Littoral	1	Trnovo Forest Plateau	19xx	
Ski Bor	0.4 km	Idrija	692 m	735 m	Slovene Littoral	2	Trnovo Forest Plateau	19xx	
Encijan	0.4 km	Bovec	650 m	___ m	Slovene Littoral	2	Ovčja gora	19xx	
Janina	0.4 km	Rogaška Slatina	250 m	362 m	Styria	1	Janina	19xx	
Ulaka	0.37 km	Loška Dolina	___ m	683 m	Inner Carniola	1	Ulaka	19xx	
Rudno	0.3 km	Železniki	490 m	571 m	Upper Carniola	1	Selška dolina	19xx	
Izver	0.3 km	Sodražica	535 m	622 m	Lower Carniola	1	Travna gora	19xx	
Luče	0.3 km	Luče	525 m	595 m	Styria	2	Raduha	19xx	
Osovje	0.3 km	Kamnik	___ m	___ m	Upper Carniola	1	Greben	19xx	
Vojsko	0.3 km	Idrija	692 m	735 m	Slovene Littoral	2	Trnovo Forest Plateau	19xx	
Pungrat	0.1 km	Kranj	415 m	430 m	Upper Carniola	1	Rovnik	19xx	

^{1}skilift/chair-lift/cable car; if only one number: total

== Not working ==
Abandoned or ex ski resorts, although most lifts still stand. Mostly financial reasons or ski lifts are out of date and modern standards or demolished.

Resort	Total	Municipality	Bottom	Top	Region	Lifts^{1}	Mountain range	Year	Web
Kobla	23 km	Železniki	512 m	1499 m	Upper Carniola	6	Julian Alps	19xx	
Mežica	12 km	Mežica	500 m	996 m	Carinthia	2	Štalekarjev vrh	1961	
Kalič	6.5 km	Postojna	765 m	981 m	Inner Carniola	4	Javornik Hills	1972	
Zelenica	4.25 km	Tržič / Žirovnica	1088 m	1704 m	Upper Carniola	5	Karawanks	1965	
Ivarčko–Ošven	4 km	Ravne na Koroškem	650 m	1108 m	Carinthia	3	Smrekovec Mountains	19xx	
Gozd–Martuljek	0.7 km	Kranjska Gora	___ m	___ m	Upper Carniola	1	Julian Alps	19xx	
Gunclje	0.6 km	Ljubljana	319 m	470 m	Upper Carniola	3	Šentvid Hill	1970	
Repše	0.4 km	Kamnik	___ m	___ m	Upper Carniola	1	Velika Planina	19xx	
Zaplečnik	0.3 km	Kamnik	___ m	___ m	Upper Carniola	1	Tuhinj Valley	19xx	
Zatrnik	x km	Gorje	___ m	___ m	Upper Carniola	4	Hotunjski vrh	19xx	
Cestnik	x km	Prebold	___ m	___ m	Styria	1	Žvajga	19xx	
Paričjak	x km	Radenci	___ m	___ m	Styria	1	Slovene Hills	19xx	

== See also ==
- Julian Alps
- Kamnik–Savinja Alps
- Pohorje
