= Porezen =

Mountain in Slovenia

Mount Porezen
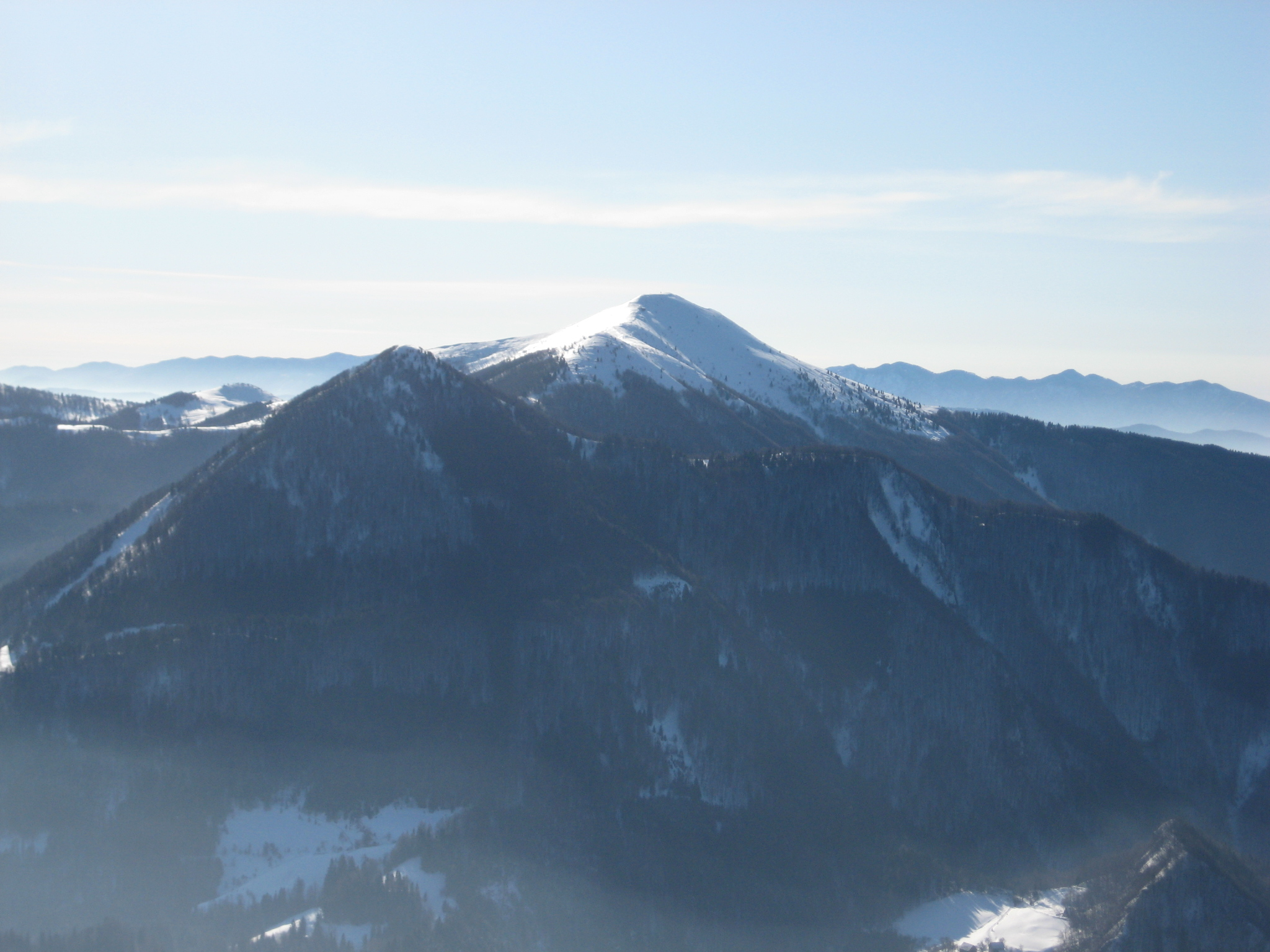
- Mount Porezen from Sorica

Highest point
- Elevation: 1,630 m (5,350 ft)
- Prominence: 827 m (2,713 ft)
- Coordinates: 46°10′39″N 13°58′28″E

Geography
- Location within Alps
- Location: Gorizia region, Slovenia
- Parent range: Slovenian Prealps

Climbing
- Easiest route: from Cerkno through Poče

Mount Porezen is a mountain of the outlying Alps located in northwestern Slovenia. It is the highest summit of the Slovenian Prealps.

== Geography ==
The mountain belongs to the Gorizia Statistical Region.

== Access to the summit ==
The suggested route for the mountain starts from Cerkno and climbs though Poce, following a marked footpath.

There are also popular routes from Davča and Petrovo Brdo.

== Maps ==
- Idrijsko in Cerkljansko (1:50,000 scale) and Škofjeloško in Cerkljansko hribovje (1:50,000 scale).
