= Davča, Železniki =

Davča
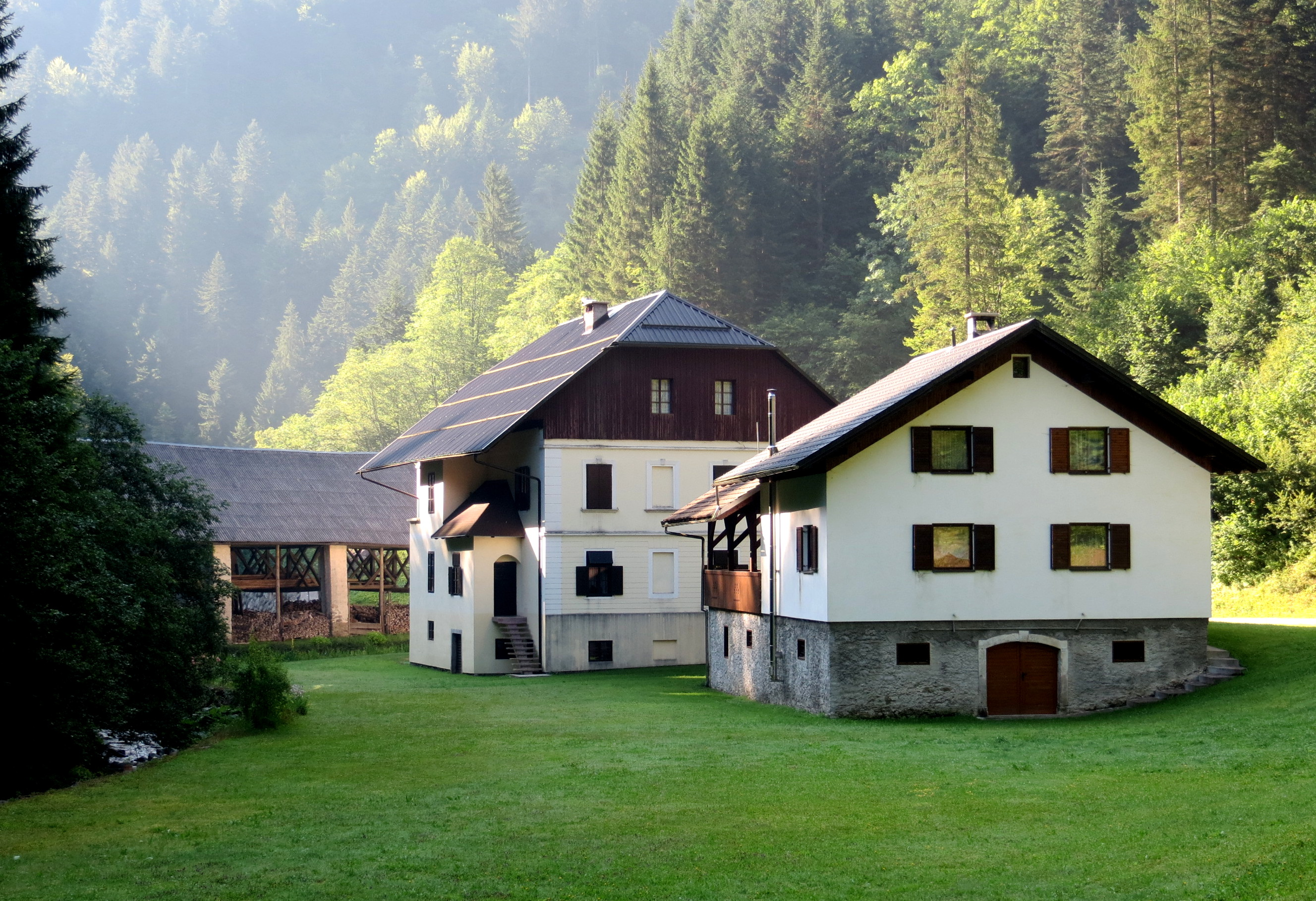

- Location in Slovenia
- Coordinates: 46°10′47.16″N 14°2′8.39″E
- Country: Slovenia
- Traditional Region: Upper Carniola
- Statistical region: Upper Carniola
- Municipality: Železniki

Area
  - Total: 24.461 km^{2} (9.444 sq mi)
- Elevation: 975.3 m (3,200 ft)

Population (2026)
  - Total: 309
  - Density: 13/km^{2} (34/sq mi)

Davča (pronounced [ˈdaːu̯tʃa]; German: Dautscha) is a scattered settlement in the Municipality of Železniki in the Upper Carniola region of Slovenia. Davščica Creek flows past the settlement. The Cerkno Ski Resort is partially located in the settlement. In January 2026, the population was 309.

== Name ==
The settlement may have been attested in written sources in 1345 as de Dauonça, but reliably in 1500 and 1515 as in der Allss. The initial d- in the name is derived either from the Romance preposition ad 'at' or the German article d(ie), making the name related to place names such as Avče and probably related to the Friulian hydronym Auzza or Aussa, which is of pre-Romance origin. It may ultimately be derived from Celtic *alika 'wild service tree' or *alisa 'alder'. See Dragonja for a similar name with a fused initial d-.

== History ==
Davča is located on the westernmost edge of the medieval Dominion of Freising, the border of which was set along the line from Mount Porezen to Black Peak (Črni vrh) above Gorenji Novaki. This was later also the border between Carniola and the Gorizia Region under Austria-Hungary, as well as between the Kingdom of Italy and the Kingdom of Yugoslavia during the interwar period. Until the end of the Second World War, the only access to Davča from the north was via an unimproved road starting at the Šurk farm about 1.7 kilometers (1.1 mi) west of Zali Log. The road along the Davča (or Davščica) River was built after the war. Davča was settled at the end of the 16th century, from the south toward the north. The settlement had no defined core until 1878, when Martin Jemec built the church next to the Jemec farm.

== Church ==
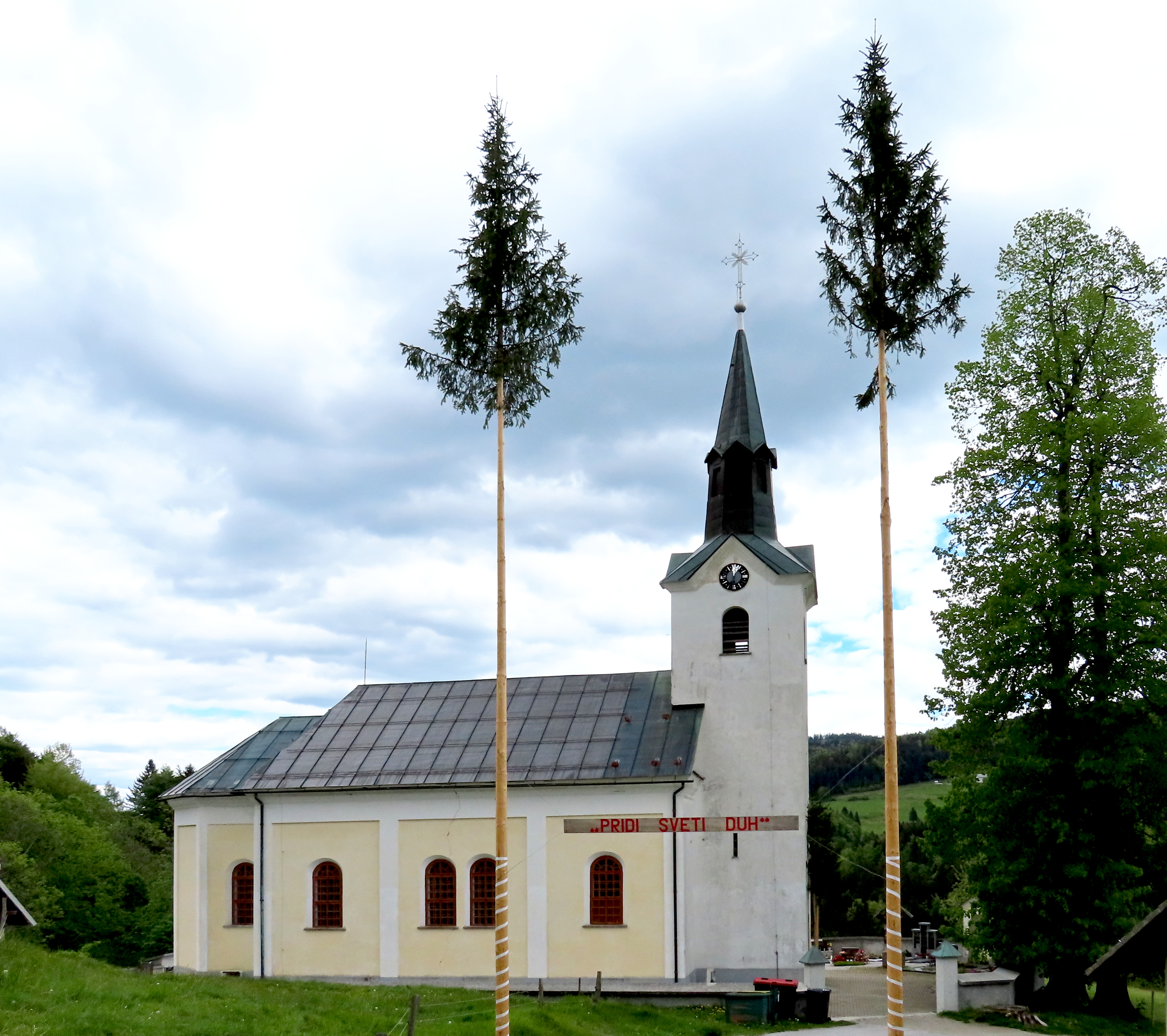
Our Lady of the Sacred Heart Church

The church in Davča is dedicated to Our Lady of the Sacred Heart. It is a single-nave church dating from 1878. The main altar was created by the stonecutter Andrej Lavrenčič from Kopriva. The statues were created by artists from Tyrol, and the paintings and the Stations of the Cross (from 1880) are the work of Štefan Šubic (1820–1884).
