= Kope–Ribnica Pohorje Ski Resort =

Ski resort

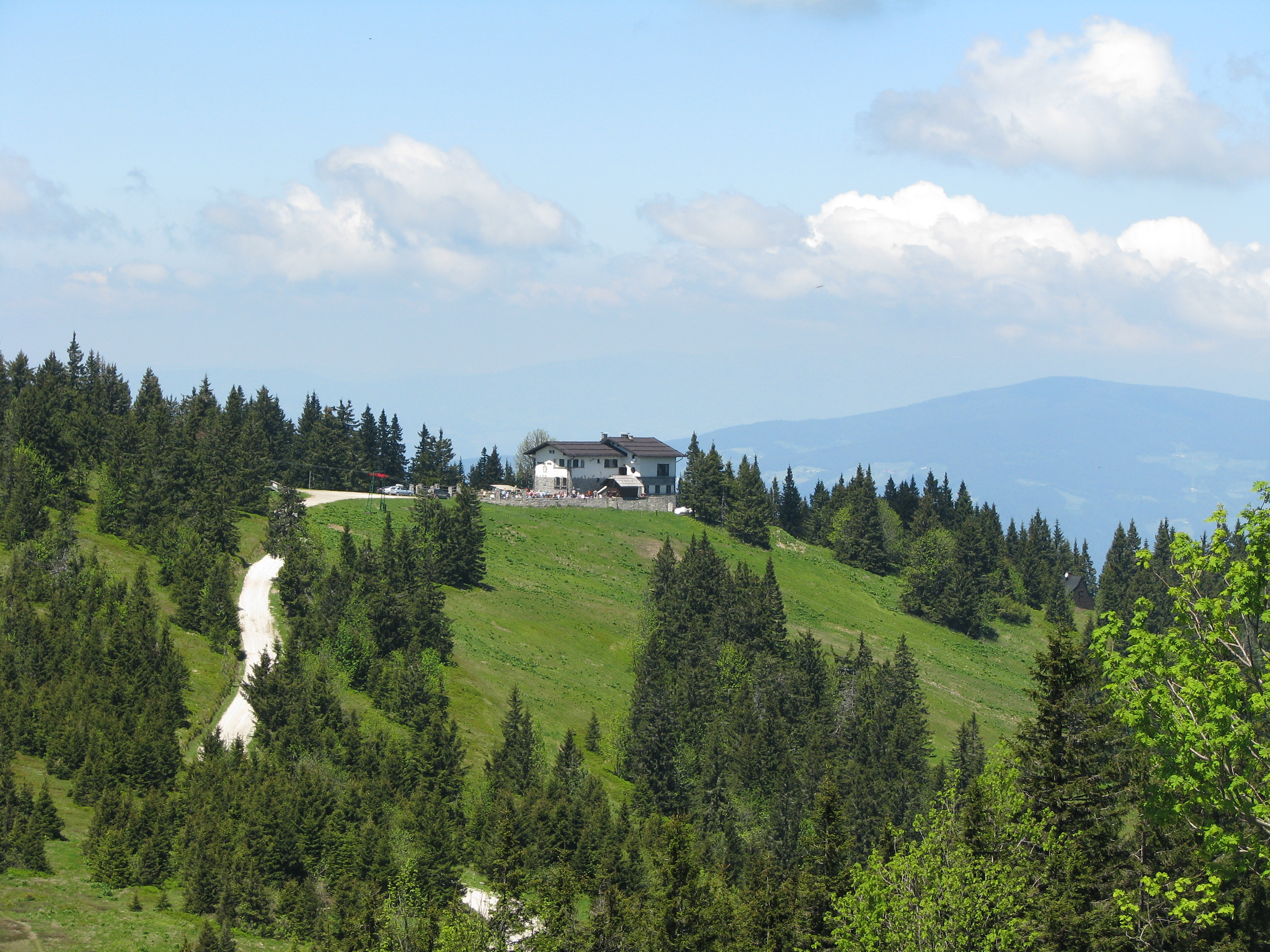
- Ribnica Hut (top lift)
- Interactive map of Kope–Ribnica Pohorje Ski Resort
- Location: Slovenj Gradec/Ribnica na Pohorju; West Pohorje; Slovenia
- Nearest city: Slovenj Gradec
- Coordinates: 46.5029°N 15.2111°E
- Vertical: 827 m (2,713 ft)
- Top elevation: 1,542 m (5,059 ft)
- Base elevation: 715 m (2,346 ft)
- Skiable area: 194 acres (0.79 km^{2})
- Trails: 12,5 km 4 km 5 km 3,5 km
- Longest run: 13 km (8.1 mi)
- Lift system: 11 total 10 surface 1 fourchair
- Snowmaking: yes
- Website: pohorje.org/kope-ribnisko-pohorje-winter

Kope–Ribnica Pohorje Ski Resort (Slovene: Smučišče Kope–Ribniško Pohorje) is a joined Slovenian ski resort located in western part of Pohorje mountain in municipality of Slovenj Gradec and Ribnica na Pohorju.

Kope is one area resort and a few kilometers away Ribnica Pohorje (Ribniško Pohorje), consisting of the ski areas "Ribnica Hut" (Ribniška koča) and "Ribnica na Pohorju". Today they are presented as one resort.

== Resort statistics ==
Elevation
Summit - 1,542 m / (5,058 ft)
Base - 715 m / (2,345 ft)

Ski Terrain
0,79 km^{2} (194 acres) - Kope, Ribnica Pohorje (Ribniška koča & Ribnica na Pohorju) covering over 15 km (9.3 mi) on one mountain.

Slope Difficulty
/

Vertical Drop
- 827 m (2712 ft) in total

Longest Run: "Kaštivnik"

Average Winter Daytime Temperature:

Average Annual Snowfall:

Lift Capacity: 7,600 skiers per hour (all together)

Ski Season Opens: December

Ski Season Ends: April

Snow Conditions Phone Line: +386 (0) 2 2208885

== Other activities ==
- mountain biking, hiking
- Cross country skiing (16 km/10 miles)

== Ski lifts ==
=== GTC Kope (1010m - 1542m) ===
Name	Length
Kaštivnik	1250m
Sedlo	270m
Pungart	1015m
Velika Kopa	257m
Pahernik	583m
Kopnik	637m
Mala Kopa	341m

=== Ribnica Pohorje (736m - 1525m) ===
Name	Length
Ribniška koča (1368m - 1525m)
Velka	404m
Črni vrh	210m
Ribnica na Pohorju (736m - 900m)
Ribnica I	280m
Ribnica II	525m
