= Matej Cigale =

Slovene linguist (1819–1889)

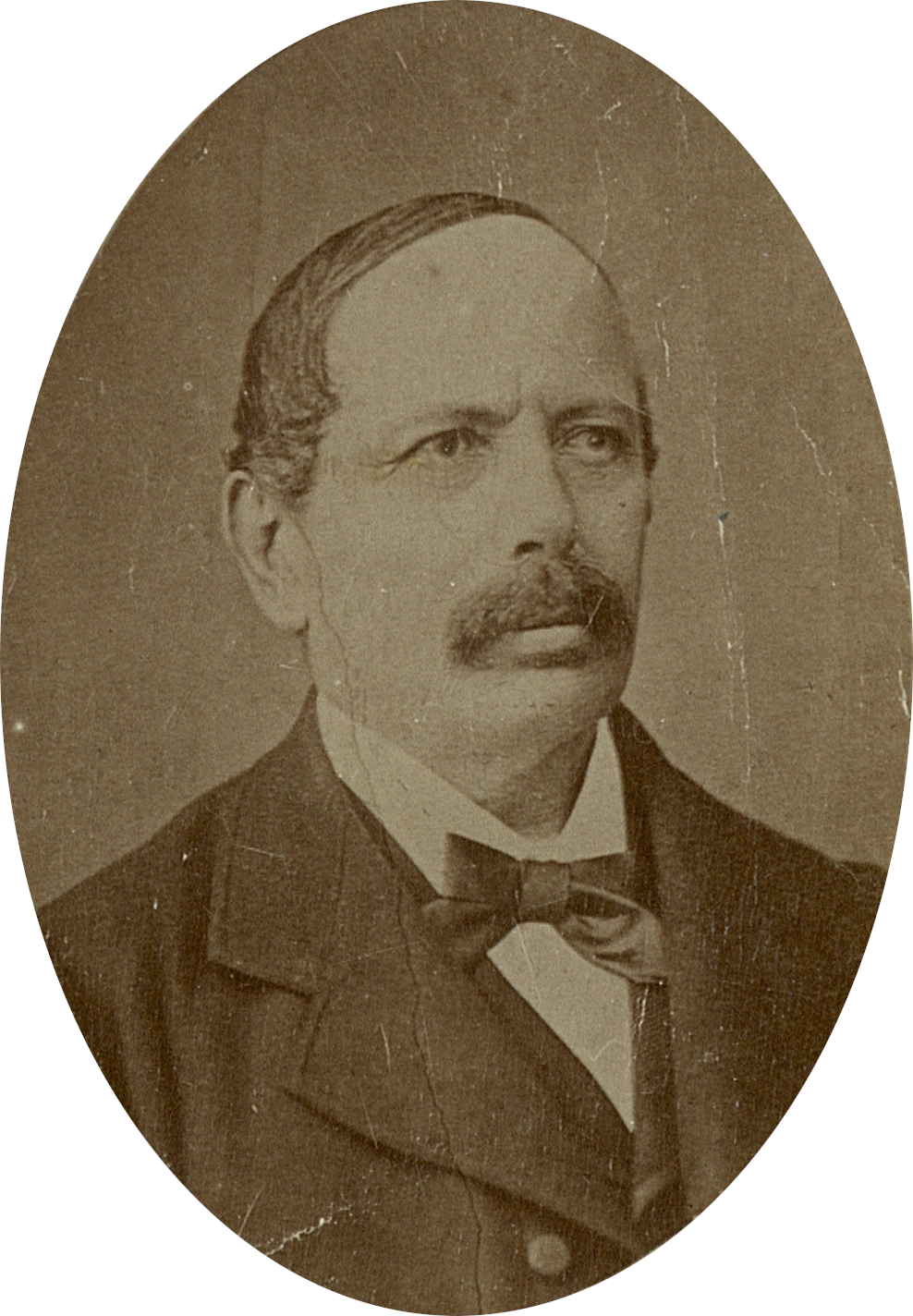
- Born: 2 September 1819; Lome, Austrian Empire
- Died: 20 April 1889 (aged 69); Vienna
- Education: University of Graz, University of Vienna
- Occupations: lawyer, linguist, editor

Matej Cigale (2 September 1819 – 20 April 1889) was a Slovene lawyer, linguist, and editor. He was one of the most influential Slovene linguists of the 19th century, particularly notable for his lexicographical and grammar work.

== Biography ==
Cigale was born on 2 September 1819 in the village of Lome and baptized Mathaeus Zigolle. He attended primary school in Črni Vrh until 1830 and high school in Gorizia until 1841. He then studied theology in Ljubljana and law in Graz and Vienna, where he graduated in 1846. He served as an trainee judge in Gorizia until 1847, and then took the exam for judges in January 1848. He gave up his position as a civil servant, and served as the secretary of the Slovenian Society (Slovene: Slovensko društvo) and editor of the newspaper Slovenija in Ljubljana from 1 July 1848 to mid-September 1849. He returned to Vienna in 1850, where he worked until his death in the editorship of the state legal code, achieving the rank of government adviser. Cigale died on 20 April 1889 in Vienna.

== Work ==
In 1853, Cigale edited the Slovenian part of the legal terminology work Juridisch-politische Terminologie für die slavischen Sprachen Österreichs and prepared Anton Mažgon and Jožef Krajnc's translation of the general civil code for publication. With this and a number of articles published in Slovenski pravnik, Cigale created the basis for Slovene legal terminology and technical terminology in general. As an expert reviewer, he also had an influence on the language used in Slovene school textbooks. He dealt with the issue of standard Slovene throughout his career. He published articles on Slovene orthography, declension, and morphology in various newspapers (e.g., Slovenski glasnik, Novice). Because of his experience with the language and terminology, he was entrusted with the editorship of Anton Aloys Wolf's German–Slovene dictionary. After receiving the manuscript for the dictionary in 1854, which had been compiled over the course of 50 years, Cigale revised and supplemented it so that it was ready for publication by 1860. This was the first major printed Slovenian dictionary. As a supplement to the dictionary he also prepared a work titled Znanstveno terminologijo s posebnim ozirom na srednja učilišča (Scientific Terminology with a Special Emphasis on Secondary Schools).

== Legacy ==
Cigale Street (Slovene: Cigaletova ulica) in Ljubljana is named after Cigale.
