= Cerkno Ski Resort =

Slovenian Modern Ski Resort

Cerkno
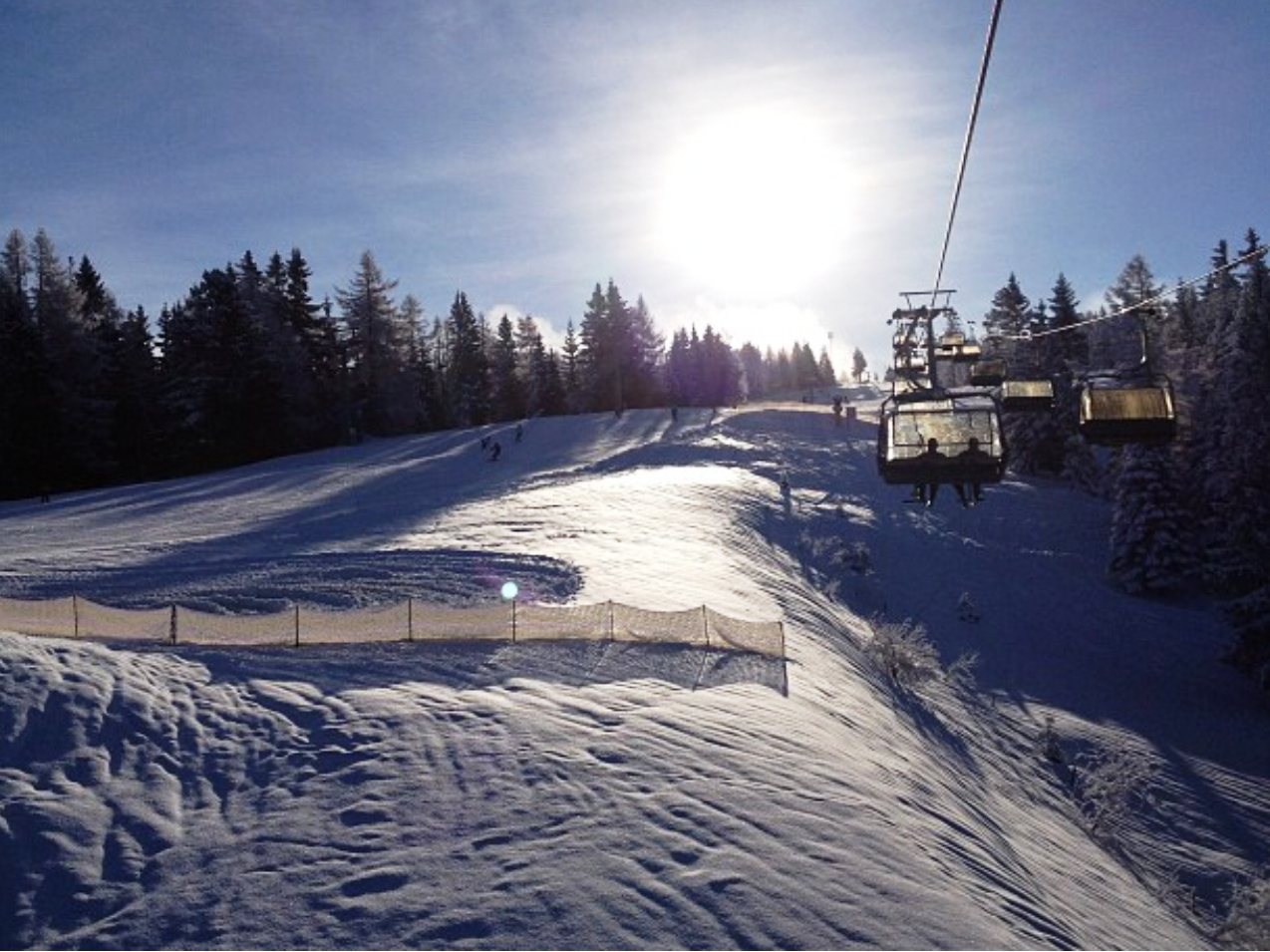

- Location in Slovenia
- Location: Davča, Cerkno, Slovenia (Cerkno Hills)
- Nearest city: Škofja Loka (31 km); Ljubljana (53 km); Klagenfurt (90 km); Trieste (142 km); Maribor (180 km); Venice (208 km); Munich (401 km); Vienna (436 km); Budapest (515 km)
- Coordinates: 46.1556°N 14.0491°E
- Vertical: 387 m (1,270 ft)
- Top elevation: 1,287 m (4,222 ft)
- Base elevation: 900 m (3,000 ft)
- Skiable area: 70 hectares (170 acres)
- Trails: 18 km (11.2 mi): 6 km (3.7 mi); 6 km (3.7 mi); 6 km (3.7 mi)
- Longest run: Počivalo 5: 1.983 km (1.24 mi)
- Lift system: 8 in total: 2 surface 2 doublechair 2 fourchair 2 sixchair
- Lift capacity: 14,000 / h
- Terrain parks: Snowboard Park
- Snowmaking: yes
- Website: cerkno.com

Cerkno Ski Resort is the Slovenian most modern ski resort on Črni Vrh nad Novaki hill near Davča opened in 1984. It is located 10 km away from centre of municipality Cerkno.

It offers total of 18 km ski slopes, 5 km tracks for cross-country skiing and Snowboard Park. It was awarded for best Slovenian ski resort in seasons 2010/11, 2011/12, 2012/13, 2016/17, 2017/18, 2018/19 and 2019/20. There is a hotel and restaurant built in alpine style, situated at the top station. Cerkno summer offerings include hiking and mountain biking. It is the 6th largest ski resort in Slovenia.

== Ski area ==
=== Ski slopes ===
Slope	Length	Drop	Incline		Level
Slope	Length	Drop	Percent	Degrees	Level
Grič 1	925 m	116 m	12.1%	6.9°	
Dolina 2	324 m	71 m	22.5%	12.7°	
Lom 3	722 m	162 m	23.1%	13°	
Lom 4	892 m	162 m	18.6%	10.5°	
Počivalo 5	1983 m	330 m	16.9%	9.6°	
Brdo 6	1930 m	326 m	17.2%	9.8°	
Brdo 7	1082 m	240 m	22.2%	12.5°	
Gozd-Davča 8	559 m	160 m	30.2%	16.8°	
Davča-Lom 9	1649 m	290 m	18.1%	10.3°	

=== Lifts ===
Lift	Type
A - Brdo	4 chairlift
B - Brdo	2 chairlift
C - Počivalo	6 chairlift
D - Grič	2 chairlift
E - Dolina	T-bar lift
F - Lom	T-bar lift
G - Lom	6 chairlift
H - Davča	4 chairlift
Beginners	carpet lift

== Other activities ==
- Cross-country skiing — 5 km (3.1 miles)
- Mountain bike downhill slope
- Cerkno Hotel Spa
- Snowboard Park
- Hiking

== Awards ==
Voted for the best Slovenian ski resort by visitors and listeners of Radio Slovenia in:

- 2010/11 season
- 2011/12 season
- 2012/13 season
- 2016/17 season
- 2017/18 season
- 2018/19 season
- 2019/20 season

== Road access ==
- Motorway (Slovenia) — Koper to Ljubljana (section) — Vrhnika (exit) — Gorenja Vas — Cerkno
- Motorway (Slovenia) — Koper to Ljubljana (section) — Logatec (exit) — Idrija — Cerkno
- Motorway (Slovenia) — Karawanks Tunnel to Ljubljana (section) — Kranj, Vodice, Šentvid (exits) — Škofja Loka — Cerkno
- Nova Gorica — Tolmin — Most na Soči — Cerkno (main road)

== See also ==
- List of ski areas and resorts in Slovenia
