= Ribnica Lodge =

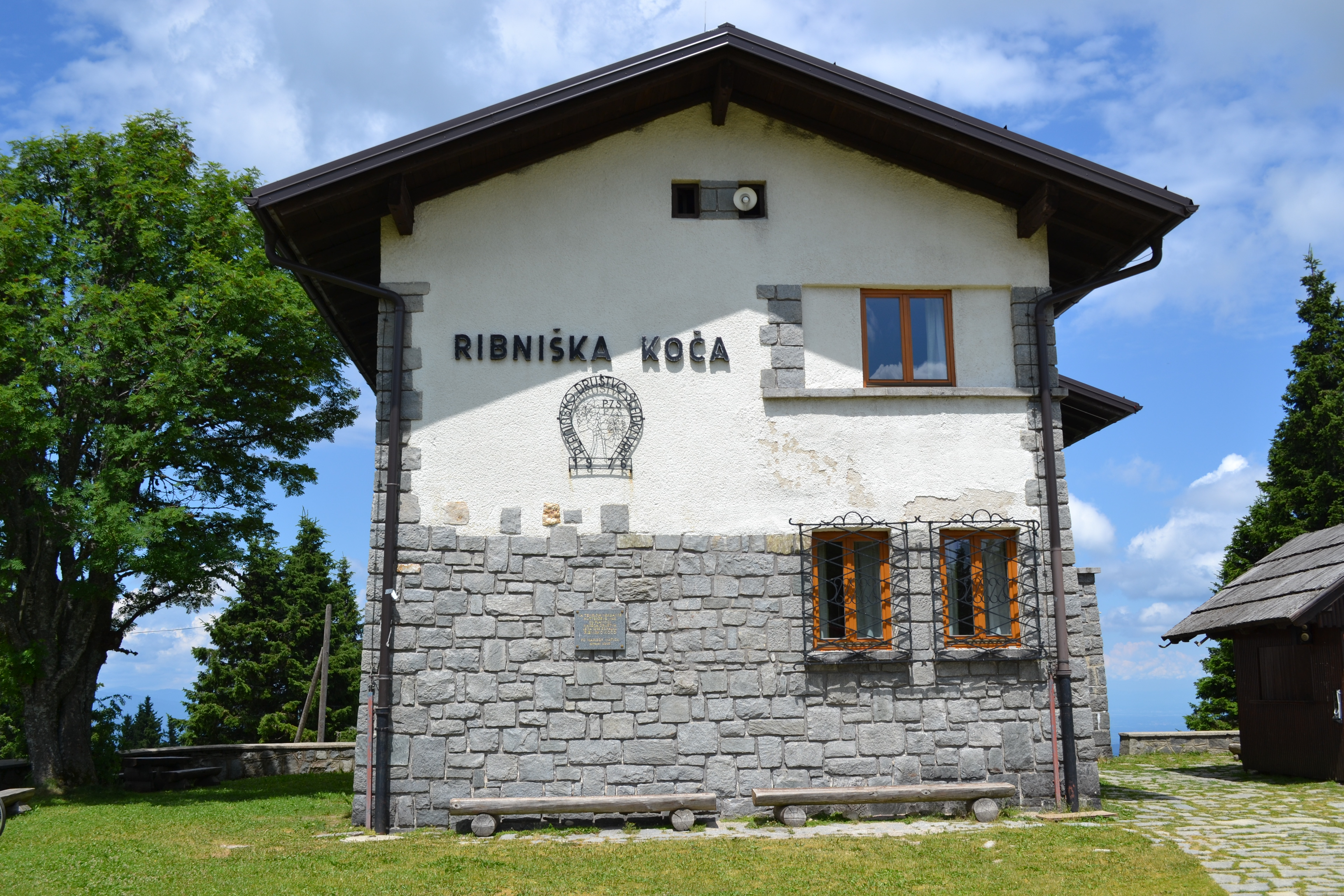

Highest point
- Elevation: 1,505 m (4,938 ft)
- Coordinates: 46°29′53.52″N 15°15′36″E

Naming
- Native name: Ribniška koča (Slovene)

Geography
- Location within Slovenia
- Location: Slovenia
- Parent range: Pohorje

The Ribnica Lodge (Slovene: Ribniška koča; 1,505 m (4,938 ft)) is the highest mountain lodge in the Pohorje Mountains (northeastern Slovenia). It lies on a small plateau below Little Black Peak (Mali črni vrh) in the central area of the Pohorje Hills. The lodge is open all year round. It is accessible by car from Ribnica na Pohorju. There is also a small ski resort with three surface lifts.

== History ==
At the time of former Yugoslavia, a lodge was built at the site by the Maribor merchant Josip Hutter. It was burned down by members of the Partisans' Pohorje Battalion on October 8, 1942. In 1949, hikers opened a new lodge at the same site.

== Starting points ==
- 1½h from the Grmovšek Lodge (Grmovškov dom)
- 3¼h from the Pesek Lodge (Koča na Pesku; via the Lakes Lovrenc (Lovrenška jezera)
- 2h from Ribnica na Pohorju – walking trail
- 3h from Planja Hotel (via Lakes Lovrenc)
- 3h Ribnica na Pohorju – by road

== See also ==
- Slovenian Mountain Hiking Trail
