= Stari Vrh Ski Resort =

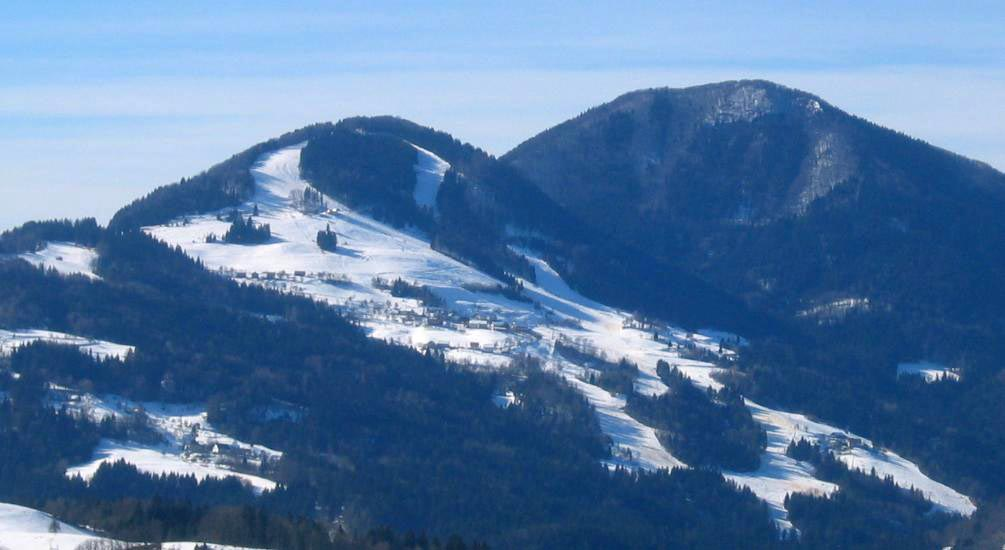
- Interactive map of Stari Vrh Ski Resort
- Location: Zapreval, Gorenja vas-Poljane; Škofjeloka hills Slovenia
- Nearest city: Škofja Loka
- Coordinates: 46.1832°N 14.1922°E
- Vertical: 636 m (2,087 ft)
- Top elevation: 1,216 m (3,990 ft)
- Base elevation: 580 m (1,900 ft)
- Skiable area: 135 acres (0.55 km^{2})
- Trails: Total 12 km 4 km 6 km 2 km
- Lift system: 6 total 1 sixschair 4 surface 1 magic carpet
- Snowmaking: yes
- Website: starivrh.si

Stari Vrh Ski Resort is a Slovenian ski resort located at Zapreval in municipality of Škofja Loka. It is a family ski resort, which has 12 km of ski slopes and is just about 20 km away from Škofja Loka and very close to Ljubljana.

== Resort statistics ==
Elevation
Summit - 1216 m / (3,988)
Base - 580 m / (1,912 ft)

Ski Terrain
0,55 km^{2} (135 acres) - covering 6 km (3.7 mi) of ski slopes on one mountain.

Slope Difficulty
expert (2 km)
intermediate (6 km)
beginner (4 km)

Vertical Drop
- 636 m - (2,086 ft) in total

Longest Run: "Stari Vrh (sixchair)"

Average Winter Daytime Temperature:

Average Annual Snowfall:

Lift Capacity: 6,000 skiers per hour (all together)

Ski Season Opens: December

Ski Season Ends: March

Snow Conditions Phone Line: 386 0 (4) 5189007

== Other activities ==
- mountain biking, hiking, cross country skiing, sledding

== Ski lifts ==
Name	Category
Stari vrh (sixchair)	red
Stari vrh (surface)	black
Valentin	red
Zapreval	green
Kopa	blue
Magic Carpet (child)	green
