= Kanin Mountains =

Mountain range in the Western Julian Alps, on the border of Slovenia and Italy

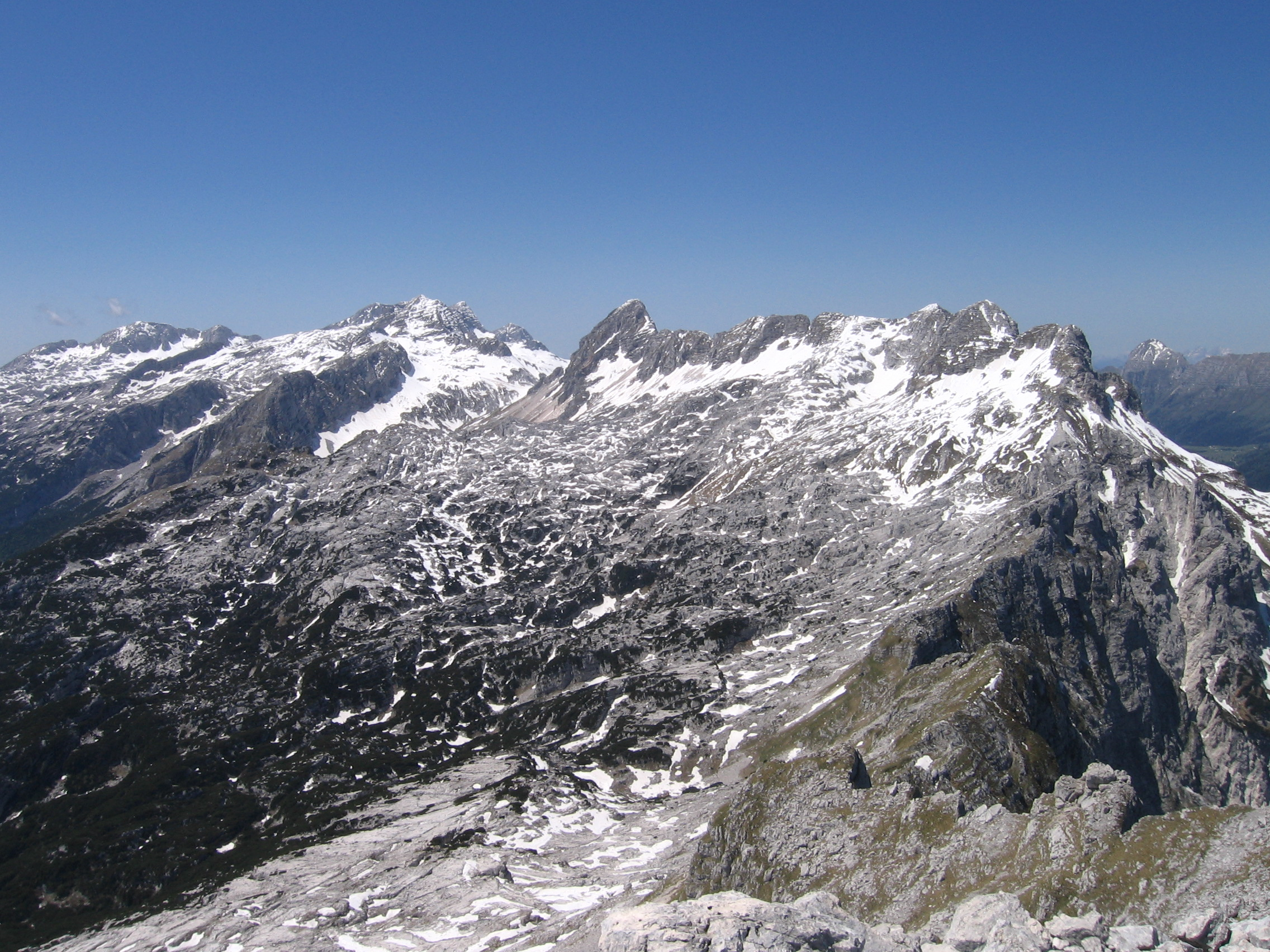

Highest point
- Elevation: 2,587 m (8,488 ft)
- Prominence: 1,403 m (4,603 ft)
- Coordinates: 46°21′32″N 13°26′22″E

Geography
- Location within Alps
- Location: Littoral, Slovenia and Udine, Italy
- Parent range: Julian Alps

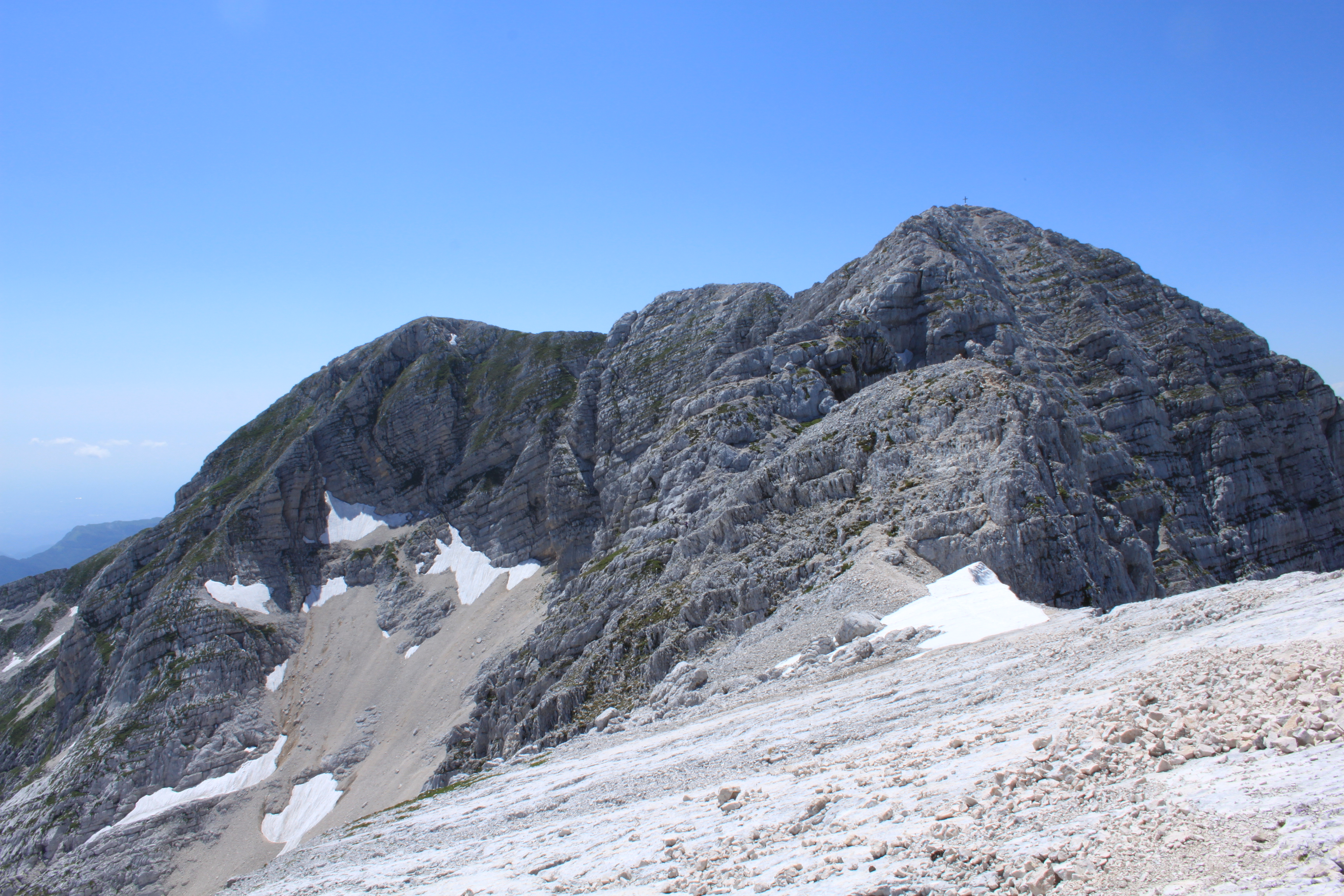
High Kanin

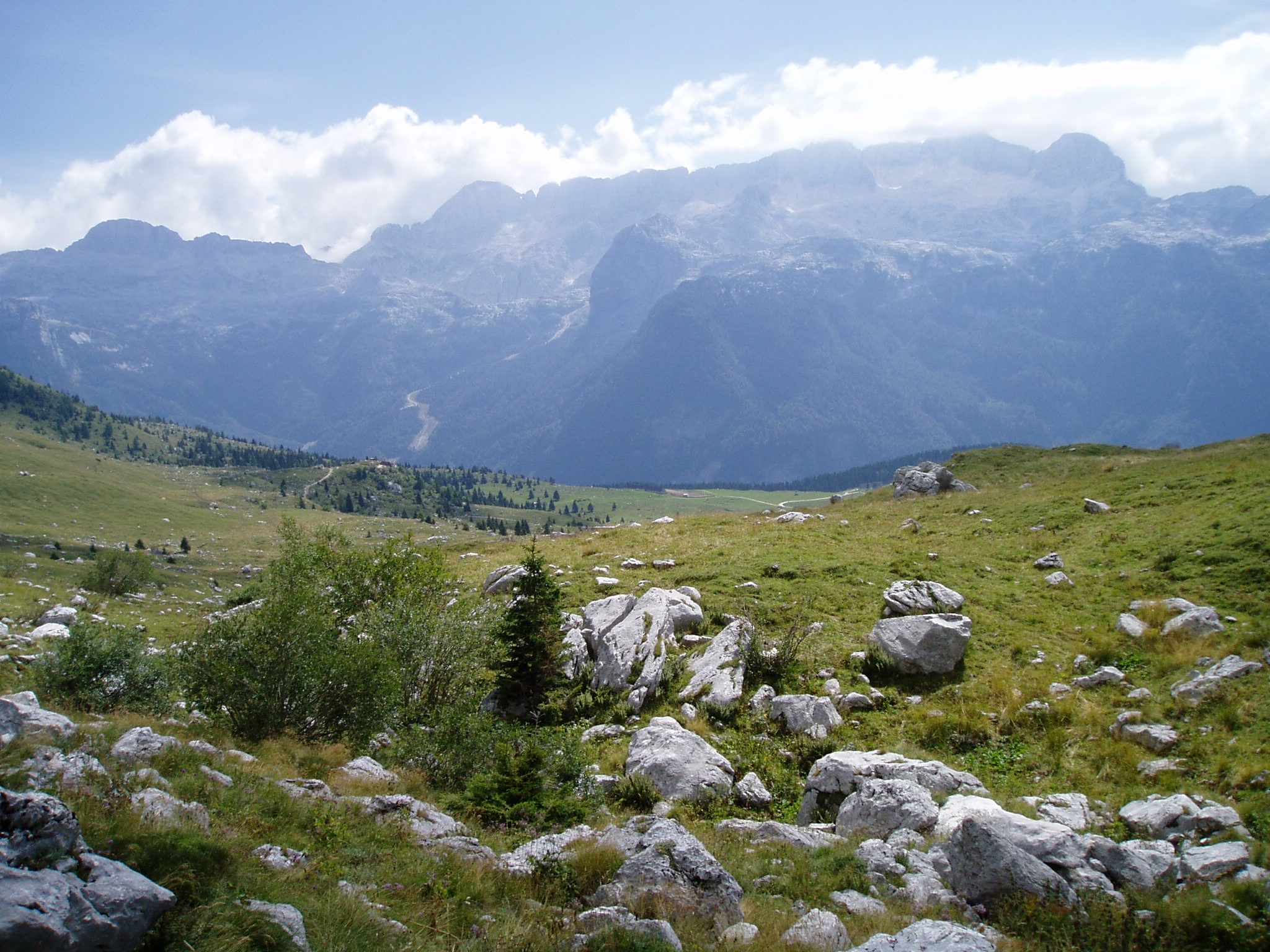
Kanin

The Kanin Mountains or the Canin Mountains (Resian: Ćanen, (Slovene: Kanin, Friulian: Mont Cjanine), mostly simply Kanin or Canin, are a mountain range in the Western Julian Alps, on the border of Slovenia and Italy. Their highest summit, High Kanin (Slovene: Visoki Kanin, Italian: Monte Canin Alto) is 2,587 m above sea level, while the adjoining Little Kanin (Mali Kanin) is 2571 m; the pair are respectively the 12th and 13th tallest peaks in Slovenia.

The Kanin range separates Slovenia's upper Soča Valley from Italy's Resia Valley. The Slovenian side of the range is part of the Municipality of Bovec and hosts the highest ski resort in the country, while the Italian side is part of Udine Province and hosts the Sella Nevea resort. The karst landscape features a number of pits, shafts, and other erosion features, with Vrtoglavica Cave holding the record for having the deepest single vertical drop (pitch) of any cave on earth, at a depth of 603 metres (1,978 ft).

The Kanin Mountains are an important identity symbol of the people of the Resia Valley, and several popular songs in the Resian dialect are dedicated to this group, which the locals call Höra ta Ćanïnawa, or simply Ćanen.

== Routes ==
- 2½ hrs From D Postaja (The D-station of the Gondola lift), a challenging marked route.
- 5 hrs From B Postaja (The B-station of the Gondola lift), a very challenging marked route.
- 6¼ hrs From the Sella Nevea pass, climbing the via ferrata Rosalba Grasselli, a very challenging marked route.
- 4¾ hrs From the Sella Nevea pass, climbing the via ferrata Divisione Julia, a very challenging marked route.
