= Javornik Ski Resort =

Ski resort in Slovenia

- Interactive map of Javornik Ski Resort
- Location: Lome, Črni vrh nad Idrijo; Slovenia
- Nearest city: Idrija
- Coordinates: 45.9017°N 14.0815°E
- Vertical: 420 m (1,380 ft)
- Top elevation: 1,220 m (4,000 ft)
- Base elevation: 800 m (2,600 ft)
- Skiable area: 74 acres (0.30 km^{2})
- Trails: Total 7 km 3 km 2,5 km 1,5 km
- Longest run: 15 km (9.3 mi)
- Lift system: 5 total 1 doublechair 4 surface
- Snowmaking: yes
- Website: ski-javornik.si

Javornik Ski Resort is a Slovenian ski resort located at Lome, črni vrh nad Idrijo in municipality of Idrija which is also the closest town. It is 55 km away from Ljubljana.

It is a family ski resort, which has 7 km of ski slopes, and is generally operational from mid December to mid March.

== Resort statistics ==
Elevation
Summit - 1220 m / (4,001)
Base - 800 m / (2,624 ft)

Ski Terrain
0,3 km^{2} (74 acres) - covering 7 km (4.3 mi) of ski slopes on one mountain.

Slope Difficulty
expert (1,5 km)
intermediate (2,5 km)
beginner (3 km)

Vertical Drop
- 458 m - (1,377 ft) in total

Longest Run: "Javornik"

Average Winter Daytime Temperature:

Average Annual Snowfall:

Lift Capacity: 2,000 skiers per hour (all together)

Ski Season Opens: December

Ski Season Ends: March

Snow Conditions Phone Line: +386 0 (5) 3777544

== Other activities ==
- mountain biking
- hiking
- cross-country skiing (13,5 km)
- Snow park (200m)
- horse riding
- sledding course
- bike park

== Ski lifts ==
| Name | Length | Capacity |
|---|---|---|
| Javornik | 1500 m | red |
| Gladka dolina | 400 m | black |
| Dedni vrh | 700 m | red |
| Snežet | 250 m | black |
| Poligon | 700 m | red |
| Dolina | 450 m | blue |
| Malček | 200 m | blue |
| Lomčan | 300 m | blue |
