= Davščica =

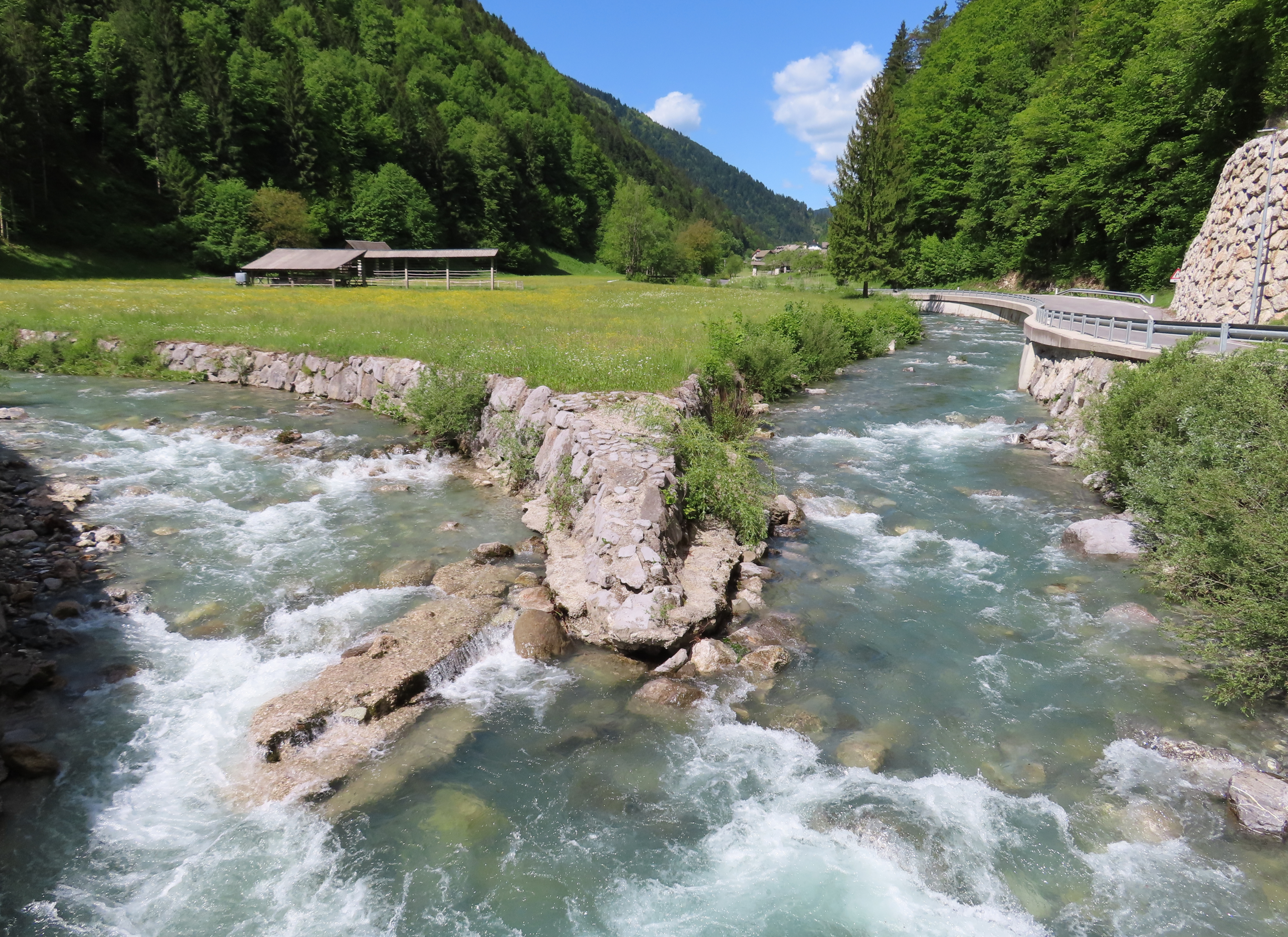
- Confluence of the Davča (left) and the Selca Sora (right)

Location
- Country: Slovenia

Physical characteristics
- Mouth
  - location: Selca Sora
  - coordinates: 46.2061°N 14.1109°E

Basin features
- Progression: Selca Sora→ Sora→ Sava→ Danube→ Black Sea

The Davščica, also the Davča, is a stream in Slovenia. It is a right tributary of the Selca Sora River. It has a torrential character and often floods. There are three waterfalls on the upper reaches of the Davča.

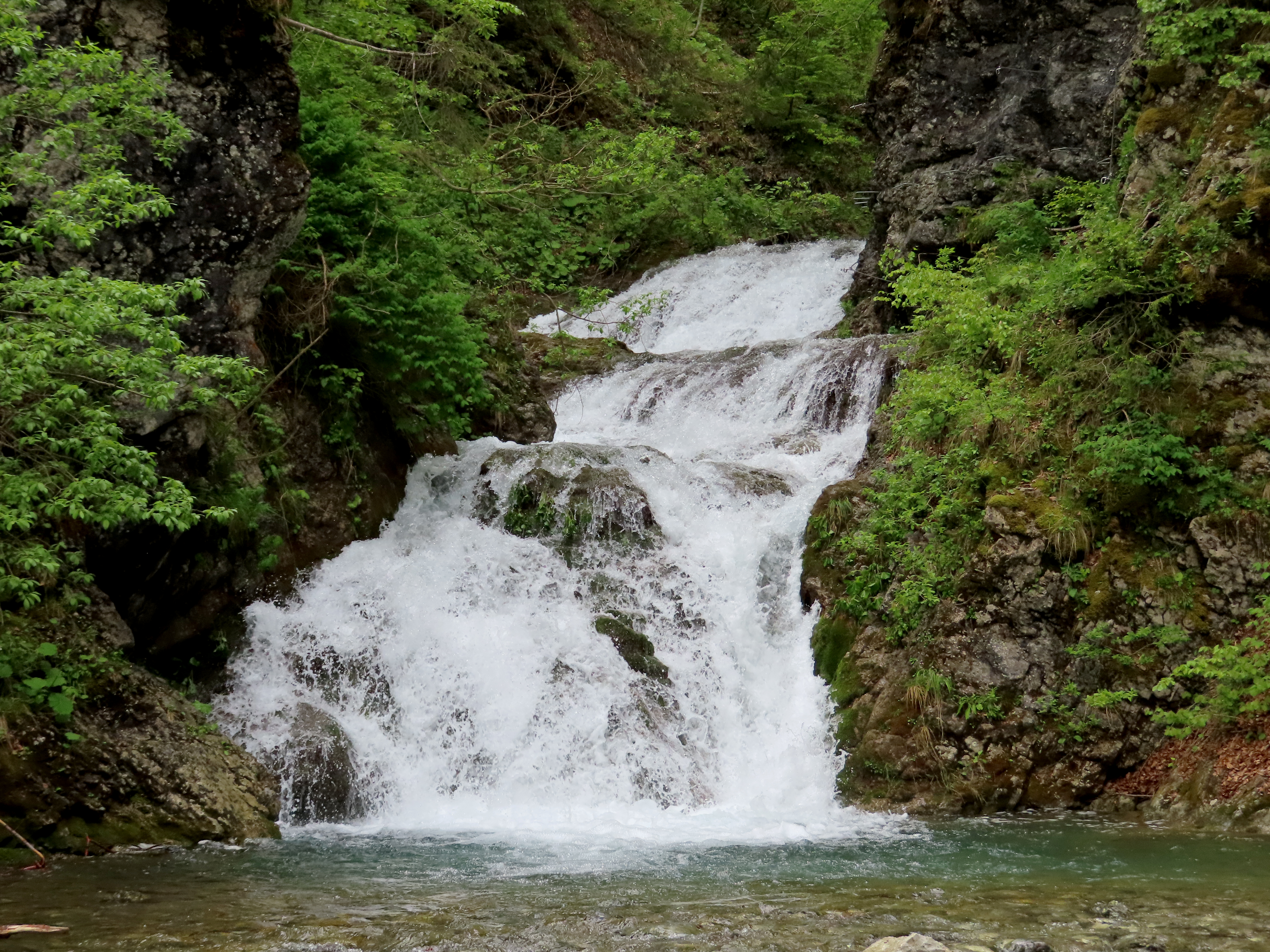
Lower falls

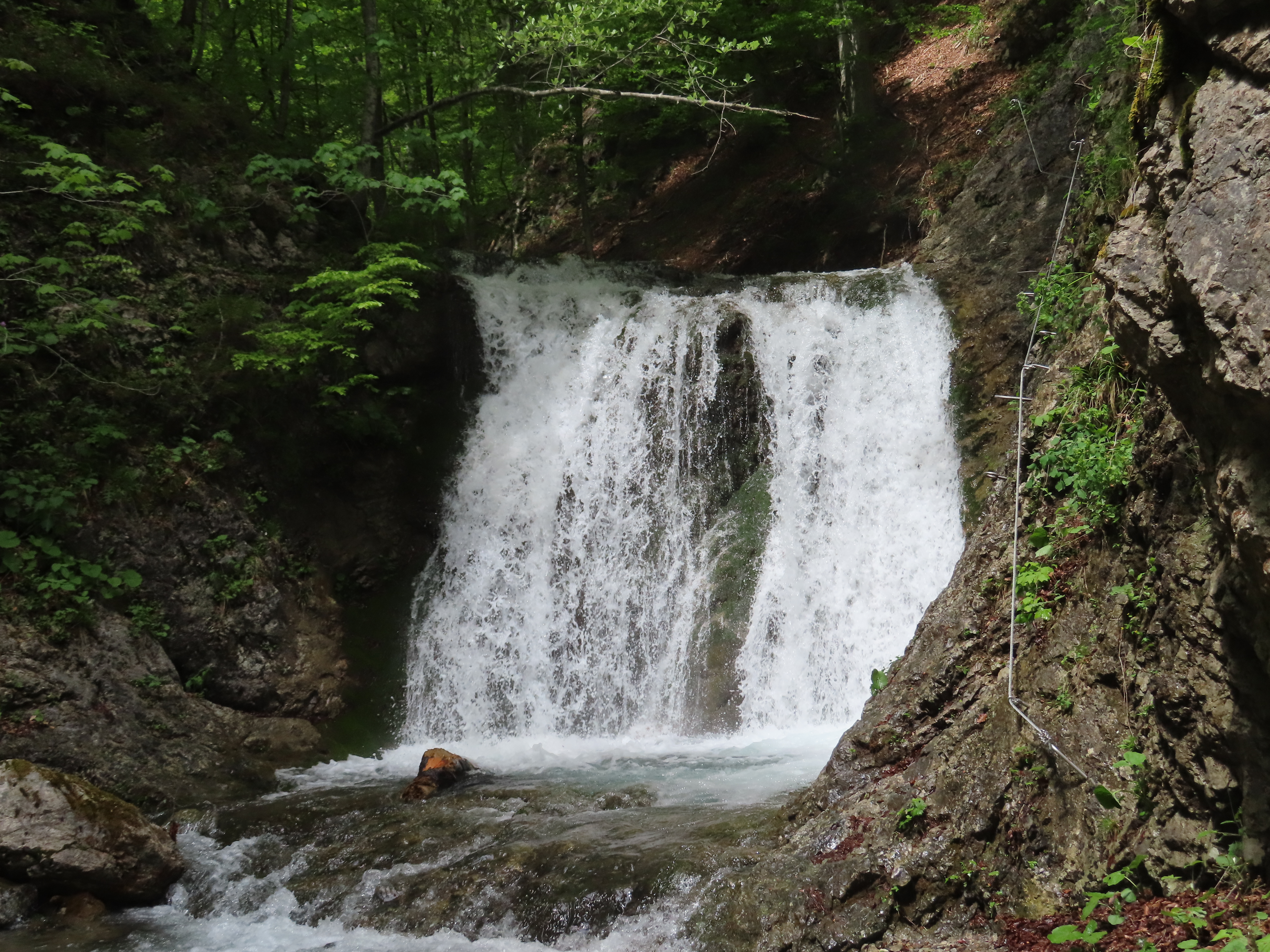
Middle falls

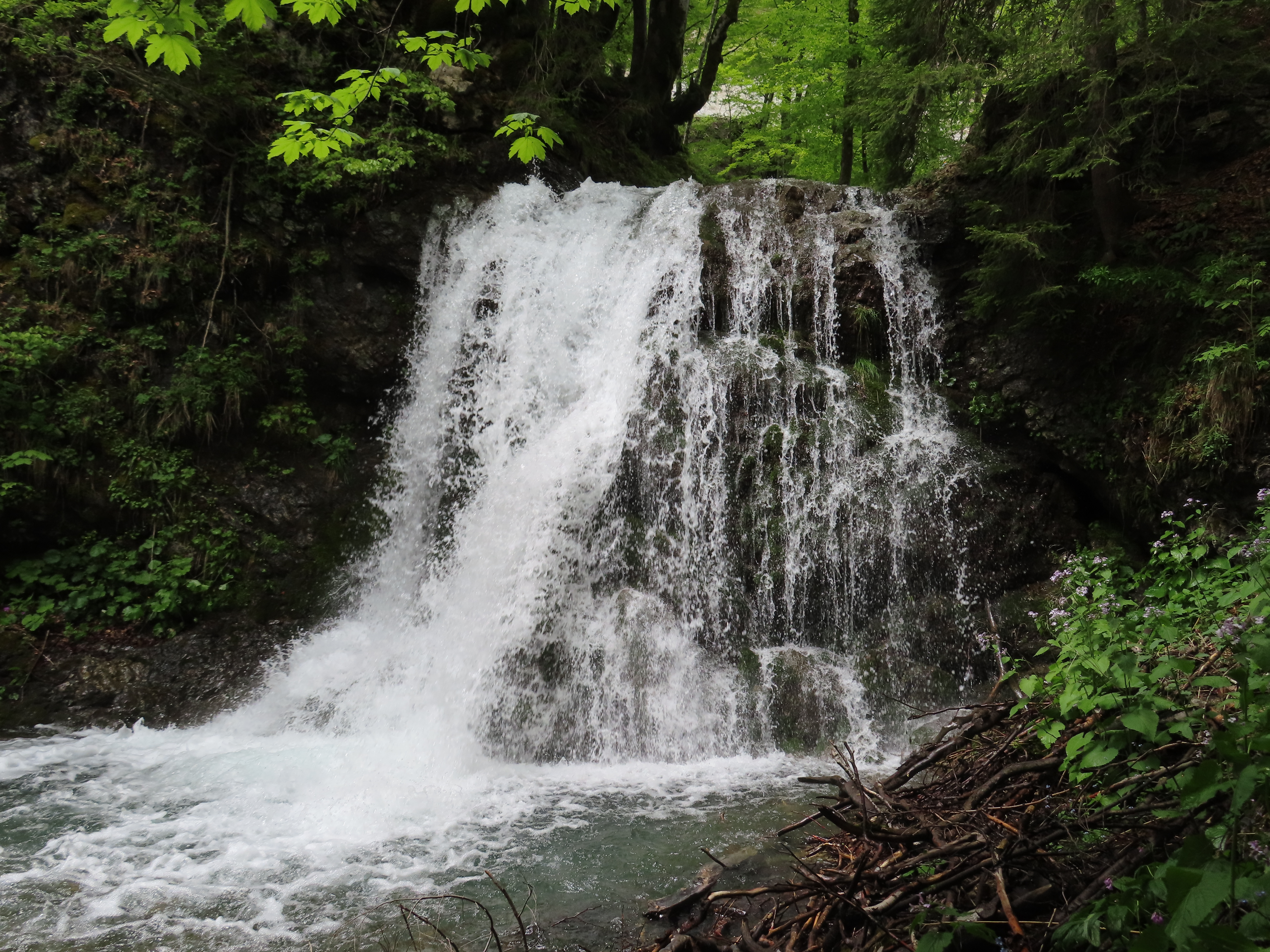
Upper falls
