= Smrečje v Črni =

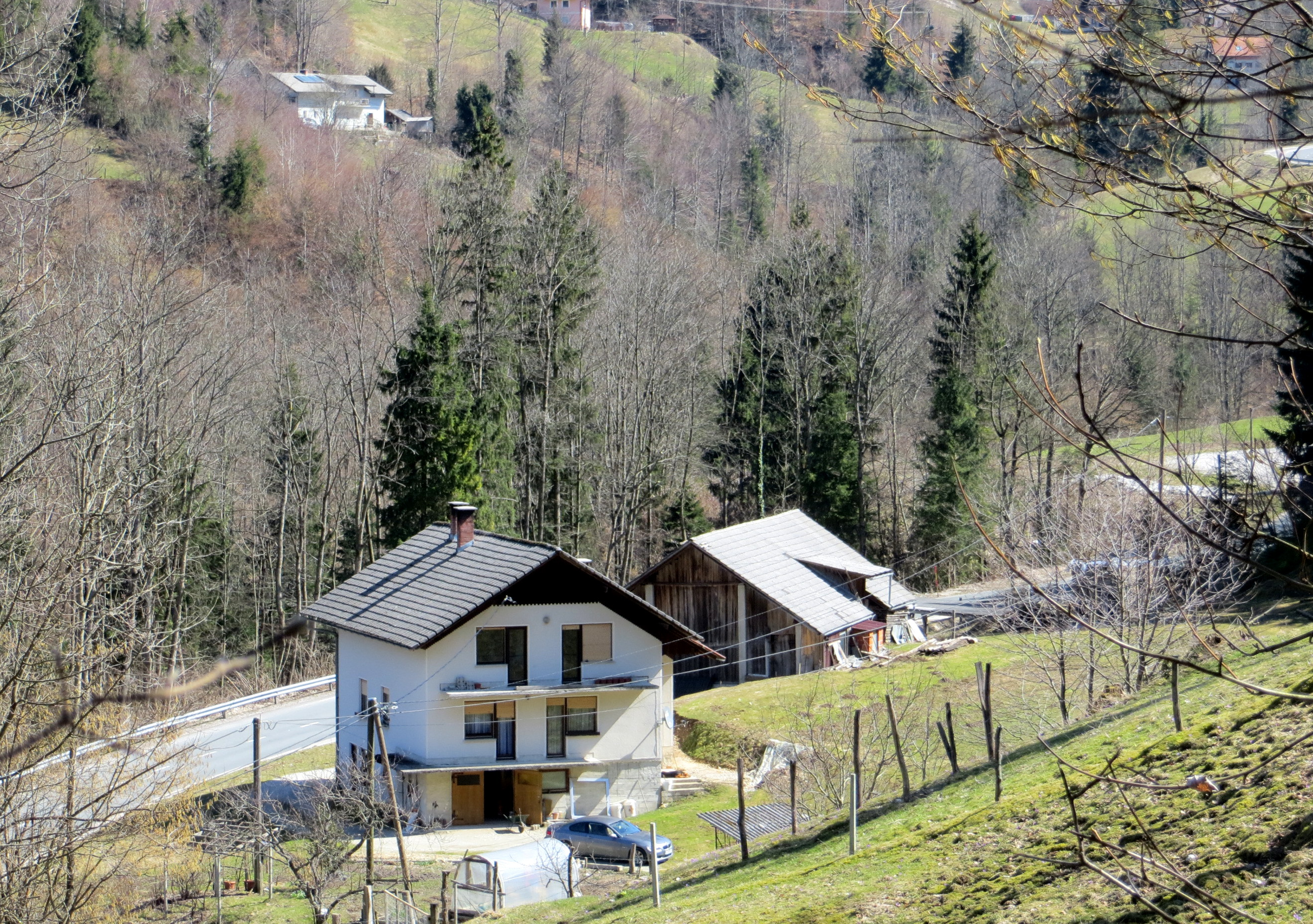

- Location in Slovenia
- Coordinates: 46°15′38.63″N 14°40′23.34″E
- Country: Slovenia
- Traditional region: Upper Carniola
- Statistical region: Central Slovenia
- Municipality: Kamnik

Area
  - Total: 0.86 km^{2} (0.33 sq mi)
- Elevation: 686.6 m (2,253 ft)

Population (2002)
  - Total: 25

Smrečje v Črni (pronounced [ˈsmɾeːtʃjɛ ʍ ˈtʃəɾni]) is small settlement under the Črnivec Pass in the Municipality of Kamnik in the Upper Carniola region of Slovenia.

== Name ==
The name of the settlement was changed from Smrečje to Smrečje v Črni in 1953.
