= Bela Ski Resort =

SC Gače Ski Resort (formerly Bela Ski Resort)
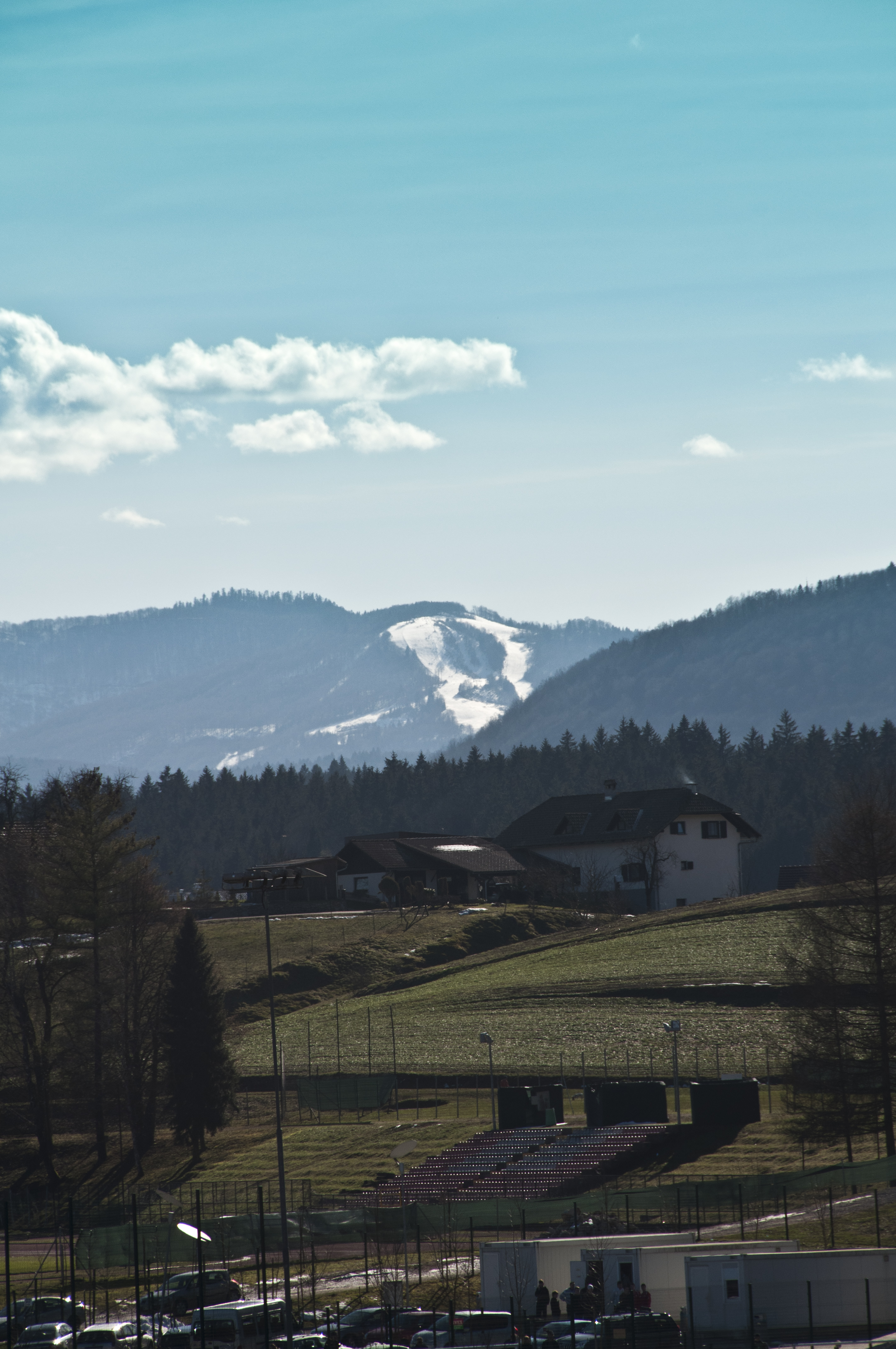
- View of "Gače" from Novo Mesto
- Interactive map of SC Gače Ski Resort (formerly Bela Ski Resort)
- Location: Semič; Pogorelec mountain Slovenia
- Nearest city: Novo Mesto
- Coordinates: 45.6646°N 15.0893°E
- Vertical: 265 m (869 ft)
- Top elevation: 965 m (3,166 ft)
- Base elevation: 700 m (2,300 ft)
- Skiable area: 0.55 square kilometres (140 acres)
- Trails: Total 8 km 1 km 3 km 3 km 1 km
- Longest run: 28 km (17 mi)
- Lift system: 6 total 1 triplechair 5 surface
- Lift capacity: 5.400 / hr
- Snowmaking: Yes
- Website: SC Gače website

SC Gače Ski Resort (formerly the Bela Ski Resort) is a family Slovenian ski resort in the Municipality of Semič on Mount Pogorelec. The closest city is Novo Mesto. It is near the Croatian border. The resort offers 8 km of ski slopes with various difficulty and 6.5 km of cross-country skiing (2 tracks). There are also a sledding slope, a hiking path, and a mountain biking trail in the summer.

== Accommodation ==
Neither the nearest village Črmošnjice has accommodation capacities nor the Ski resort, but in the nearby SPA town of Dolenjske Toplice (12 km away) there are some Hotels and a waterpark.

== Ski lifts ==
Lift name	Type of the lift	Manufacturer	Year of construction
Gričice	Triplechair	Leitner	2003
Medo	Surface lift	no info	no info
Gače	Surface lift	no info	no info
Bis	Surface lift	no info	no info
Vrh levo	Surface lift	no info	no info
Vrh desno	Surface lift	no info	no info

== Ski slopes ==
Name	Length	Category
Trail A1	900 m	
Trail A2	1500 m	
Trail A3	1000 m	
Vrh Connection	700 m	
Trail B	1000 m	
Vrh Left	400 m	
Vrh Right	400 m	
Otroška	600 m	
