= Lome, Idrija =

Lome
- Location in Slovenia
- Coordinates: 45°55′4.84″N 14°4′40.71″E
- Country: Slovenia
- Traditional region: Inner Carniola
- Statistical region: Gorizia
- Municipality: Idrija

Area
  - Total: 11.01 km^{2} (4.25 sq mi)
- Elevation: 654.6 m (2,148 ft)

Population (2002)
  - Total: 109

Lome (pronounced [ˈloːmɛ]) is a dispersed settlement in the hills southeast of Črni Vrh in the Municipality of Idrija in the traditional Inner Carniola region of Slovenia.

The village includes the hamlets of Cigale, Dolnje Lome (German: Unterlome), Gornje Lome (German: Oberlome), Grižar, Na Griču (German: Am Hügel), Na Ravni, Oblak, Podjesen, and Zakrog.

The Javornik ski slope is located at Lome.

== Notable people ==
Notable people that were born or lived in Lome include:

- Matej Cigale (1819–1889), linguist and editor
- Ivan Tominec (1890–1965), linguist
