= Kanin-Sella Nevea Ski Resort =

Slovenian-Italian ski resort

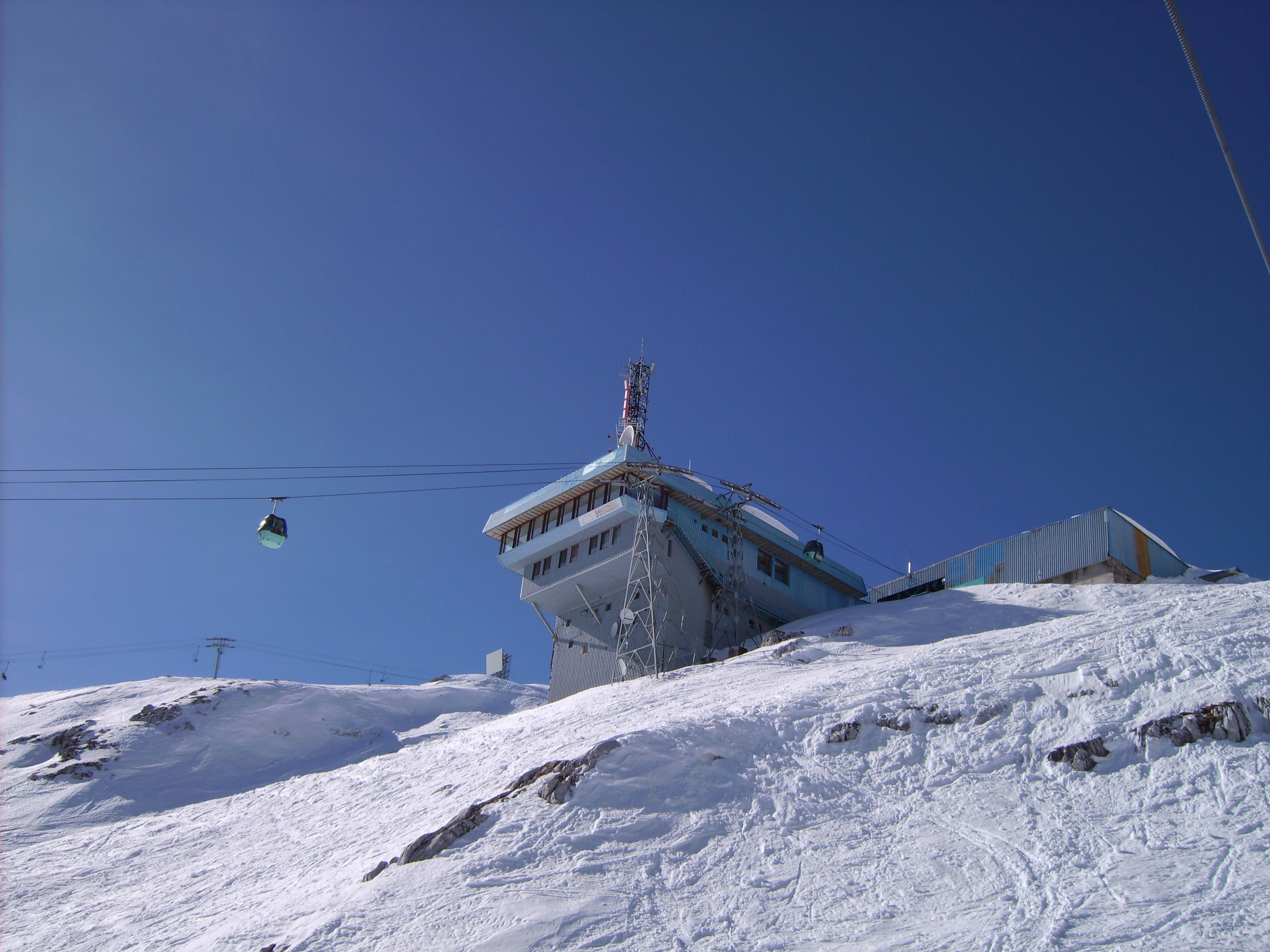
- Top station on Kanin (Slovenia)
- Interactive map of Kanin-Sella Nevea Ski Resort
- Location: Bovec/Chiusaforte; Kaninsko pogorje Slovenia / Italy
- Nearest city: Nova Gorica, Slovenia; Tarvisio, Italy
- Coordinates: 46.3376°N 13.5525°E
- Vertical: 1,152 m (3,780 ft)
- Top elevation: 2,292 m (7,520 ft)
- Base elevation: 1,140 m (3,740 ft)
- Skiable area: 0.70 square kilometres (173.0 acres)
- Trails: Total 30 km 6 km 22 km 2 km
- Longest run: 3 km (1.9 mi)
- Lift system: 12 total 1 funifor 2 gondola 5 surface 2 doublechair 1 triplechair 1 fourchair
- Lift capacity: 15.000 / hr
- Terrain parks: 1
- Snowfall: 1,100 cm (430 in)
- Snowmaking: yes
- Night skiing: none
- Website: kanin.si Sella Nevea Web Page

Kanin-Sella Nevea is a joint Slovenian-Italian ski resort located on the slopes of Mt Kanin and Sella Nevea Pass at the Slovenian-Italian border. The nearest locality is Bovec. On the Italian side, Tarvisio and Chiusaforte are the closest settlements.

It has a total of 30 km (19 mi) of ski slopes and 5 km (3.1 mi) of sledding tracks. It is the only Slovenian ski resort at 2,000 m (6,600 ft) above sea level. The Slovenian part of the Kanin Ski Resort was closed in 2013 though it was expected to be reopened in winter 2016/17.

== Other activities ==
- Cross country skiing (Log pod Mangartom, Letališče Bovec, Sella Nevea)
- Sledding (5 km) & hiking

== Ski slopes ==
Name	Length	Category
Veliki graben (Slovenia)	1050 m	
Skripi I (Slovenia)	1400 m	
Skripi II (Slovenia)	1000 m	
Skripi III (Slovenia)	950 m	
Podi (Slovenia)	1000 m	
Sedlo (Slovenia)	400 m	
Prevala (Slovenia)	1700 m	
Prevala (Italy)	1200 m	
Rifugio CAI 1 (Italy)	450 m	
Rifugio CAI 2 (Italy)	450 m	
Gilberti (Italy)	350 m	
Canin (Italy)	2500 m	
Canin Turistica (Italy)	3000 m	
Azzura 1 (Italy)	300 m	
Azzura 2 (Italy)	250 m	
Rossa (Italy)	750 m	
Rossa turistica (Italy)	1000 m	
Campo Scuola (Italy)	180 m	
Slalom (Italy)	1800 m	
