= Srednja Vas pri Kamniku =

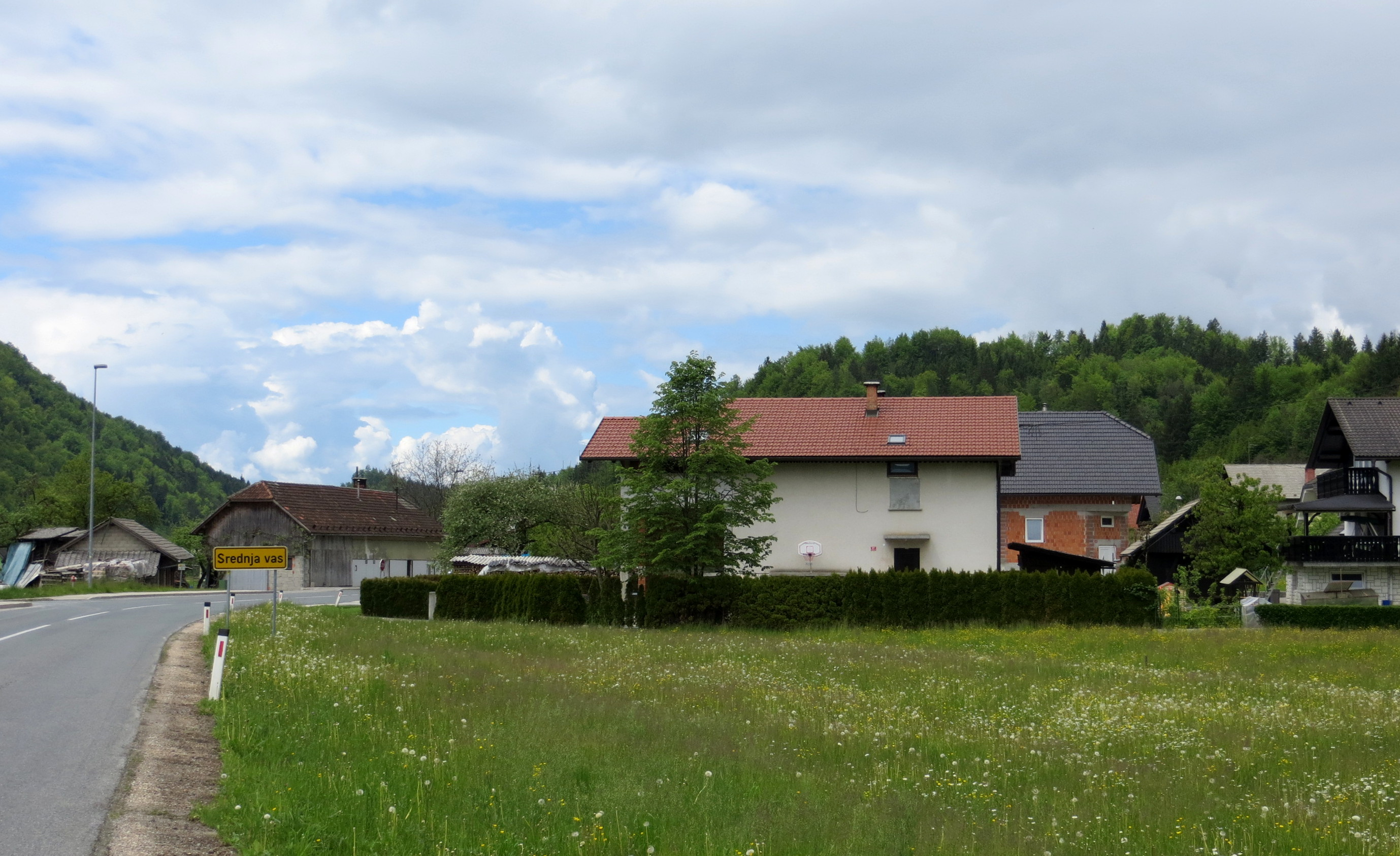

- Location in Slovenia
- Coordinates: 46°13′33.69″N 14°40′51.48″E
- Country: Slovenia
- Traditional region: Upper Carniola
- Statistical region: Central Slovenia
- Municipality: Kamnik

Area
  - Total: 1.56 km^{2} (0.60 sq mi)
- Elevation: 427.9 m (1,404 ft)

Population (2002)
  - Total: 214

Srednja Vas pri Kamniku (pronounced [ˈsɾeːdnja ˈʋaːs pɾi ˈkaːmniku]; Slovene: Srednja vas pri Kamniku, German: Mitterdorf) is a settlement on the right bank of the Nevljica River at the Kamnik end of the Tuhinj Valley in the Upper Carniola region of Slovenia.

== Name ==
The name of the settlement was changed from Srednja vas to Srednja vas pri Kamniku in 1955. In the past the German name was Mitterdorf.
