= Cerkno =

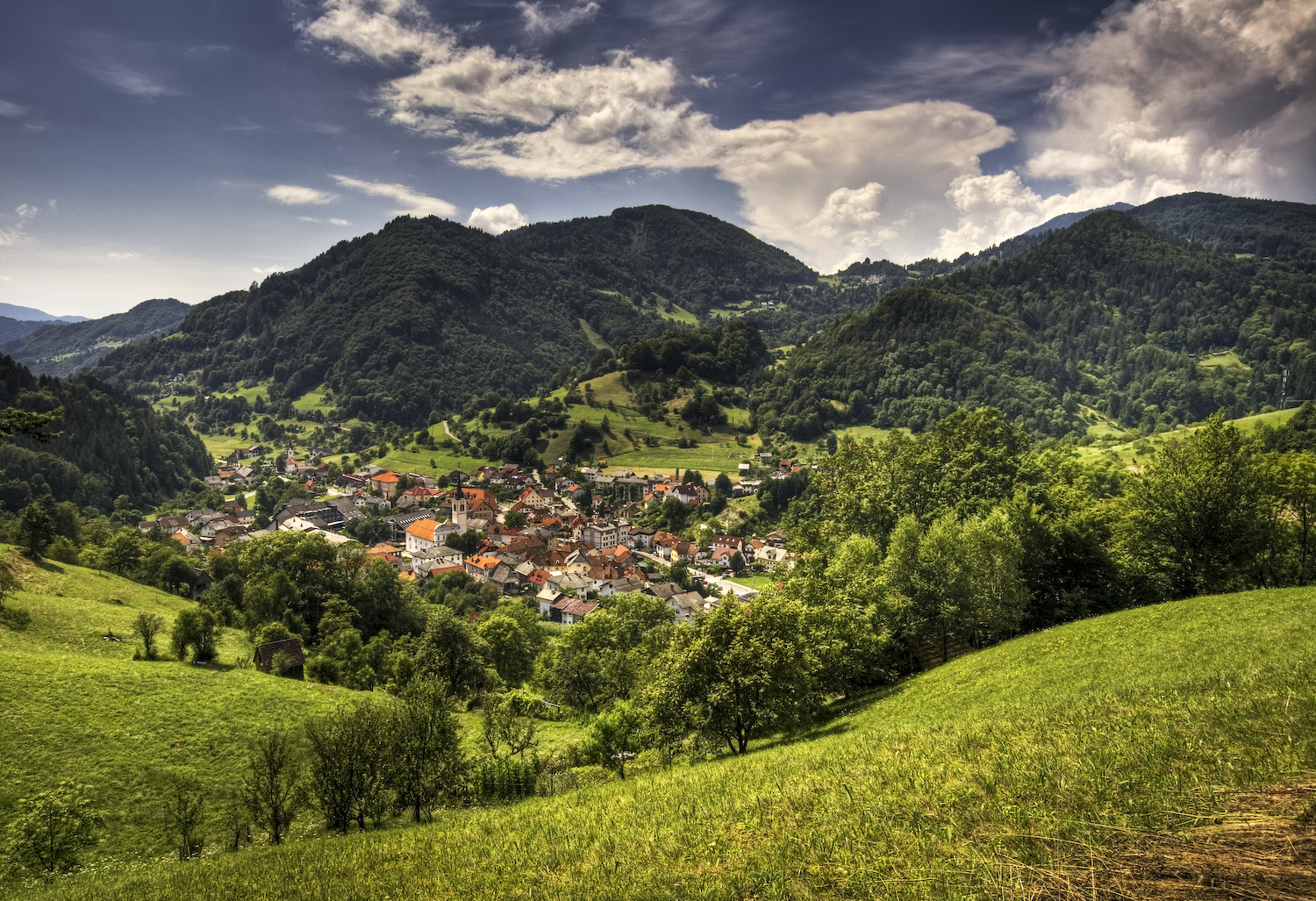

- Location in Slovenia
- Coordinates: 46°07′40″N 13°59′15″E
- Country: Slovenia
- Traditional region: Littoral
- Statistical region: Gorizia
- Municipality: Cerkno

Area
  - Total: 7.5 km^{2} (2.9 sq mi)
- Elevation: 331.9 m (1,089 ft)

Population (2020)
  - Total: 1,425
  - Density: 190/km^{2} (490/sq mi)
- Postal code: 5282 Cerkno

Cerkno (pronounced [ˈtsèːɾknɔ]; Italian: Circhina; German: Kirchheim) is a small town in the Littoral region of Slovenia. It has around 2,000 inhabitants and is the administrative centre of the Cerkno Hills. It is the seat of the Municipality of Cerkno.

Cerkno is a small but important local cultural center in the traditional Littoral region near Idrija. It is known for the Laufarija carnival, a spring festival with carved wooden masks; for Franja Partisan Hospital (Partizanska bolnica Franja); for a Partisan hospital from World War II; and as a ski resort.

== Name ==
Cerkno was attested in written records in 1257 as Curchinitz (and as Chyrchayn in 1299, Circhinç in 1337, and Circhiniz in 1486). The modern Slovene name is an ellipsis of *Cerьkъvьno (selo/polje); literally, 'church (village/field)'. The medieval attestations of the name indicate that the settlement was also once called Cerknica. The name indicates that the place was formerly a church property.

== History ==
Historically, the Cerkno Hills belonged to Tolmin County. In the 16th century, the area came under Habsburg rule, and was included in the County of Gorizia and Gradisca. After the end of World War I, the area was occupied by the Italian Army, and then officially annexed to Italy in 1920. Between 1920 and 1943, it was part of the administrative region known as the Julian March. After the Italian armistice in September 1943, Cerkno was liberated by the Yugoslav Partisans and became one of the most important centres of Partisan resistance in the Slovenian Littoral.

=== Mass grave ===
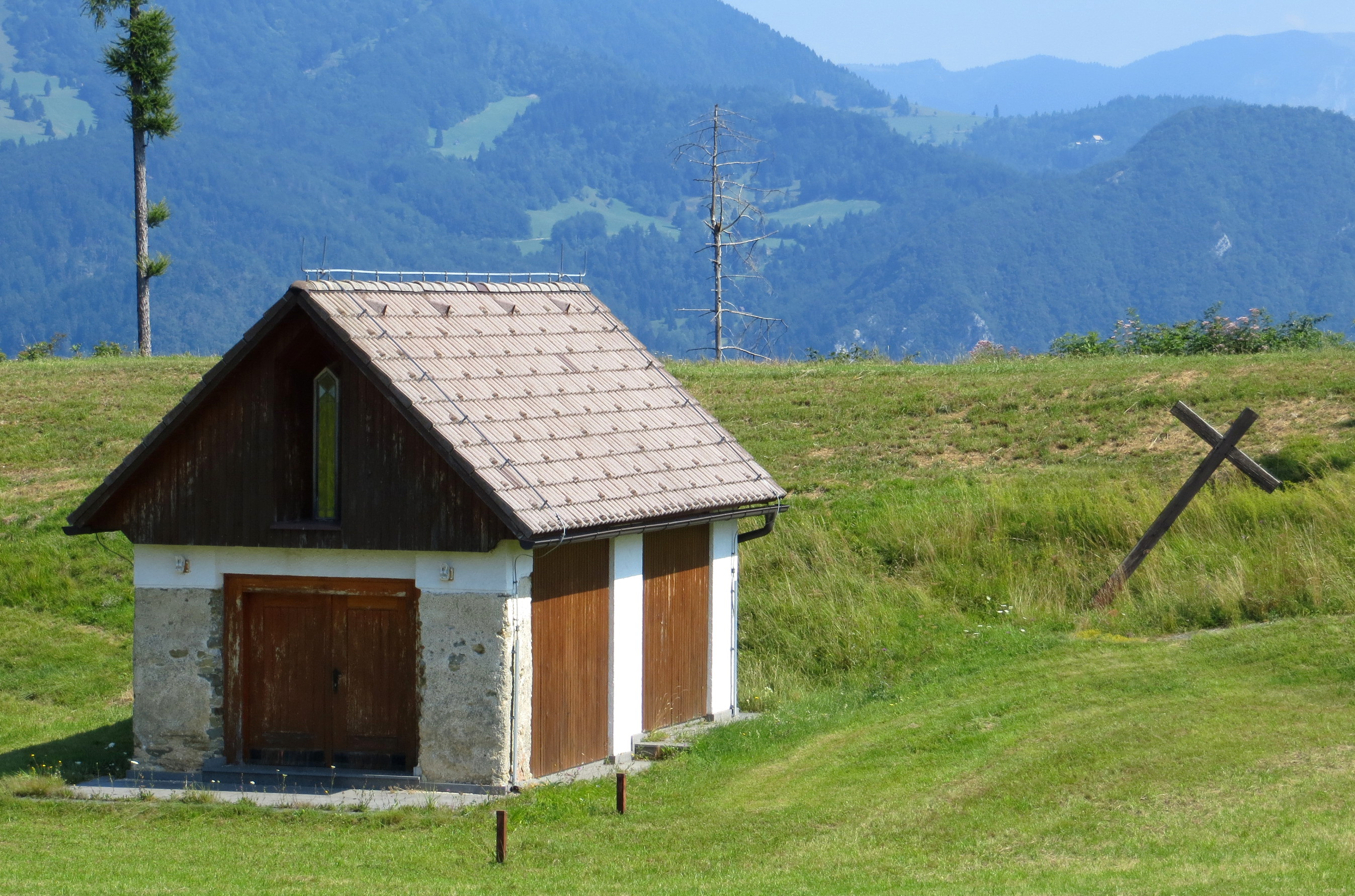
Chapel (a converted hay shed) at the Lajše Mass Grave

Cerkno is the site of a mass grave associated with the Second World War. The Lajše Mass Grave (Slovene: Grobišče Lajše) is located south of the town, in a shaft on the edge of the woods on the eastern slope of Lajše Hill. It contains the remains of 14 civilian victims (one escaped) that were suspected of anti-communist activity and were murdered on 6 February 1944 by the Partisans. They were killed in revenge for an attack on a Communist Party training school in Cerkno on 27 January 1944 that left 47 dead.

== Churches ==
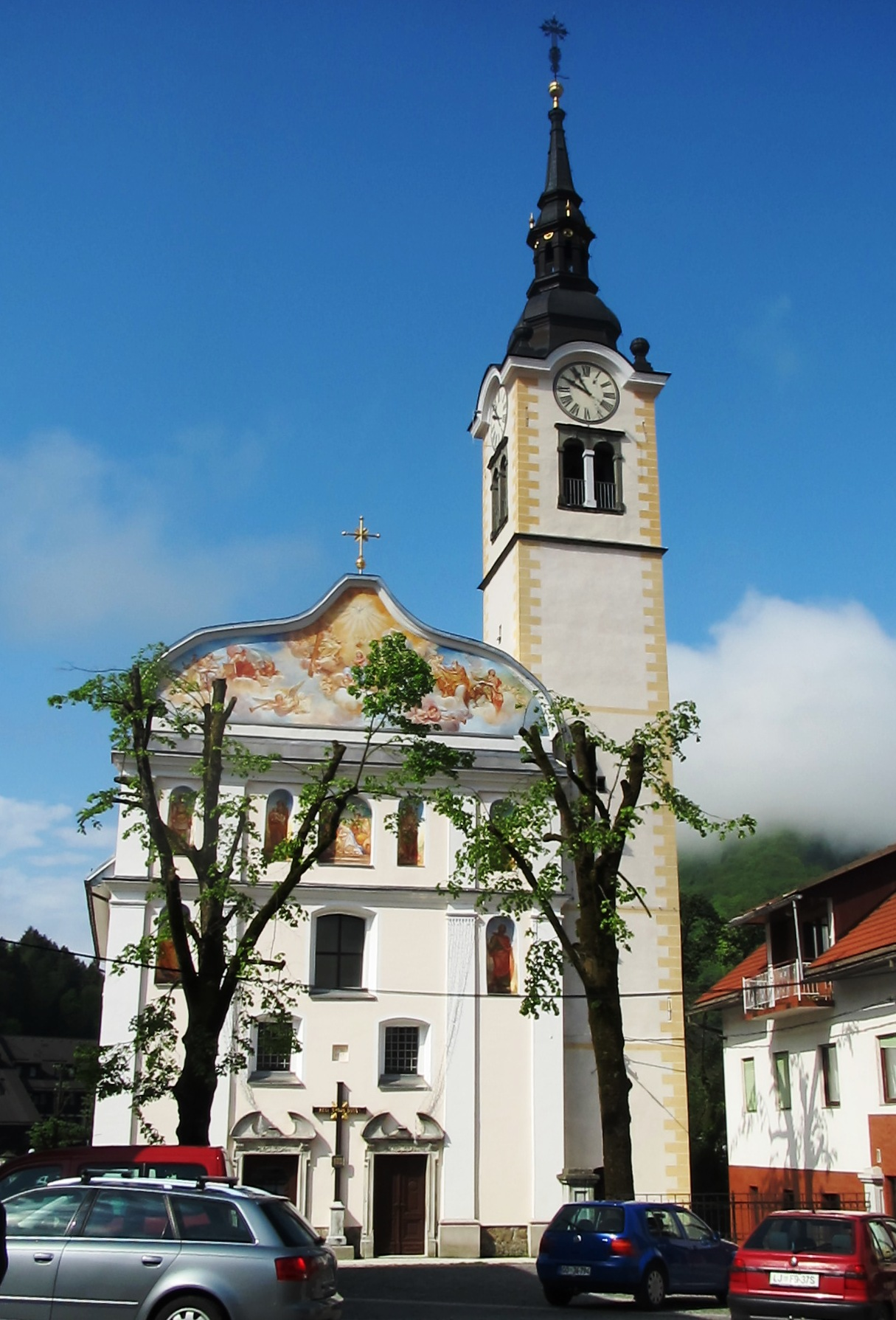
Saint Anne's Church

The parish church in the town is dedicated to Saint Anne and belongs to the Diocese of Koper. The church consist of a rectangular presbytery, a wide rectangular nave, and a belfry north of the front wall. The church dates from 1714 and has been attributed to the builder Matija Maček (c. 1657–1737) from the Poljane Valley. A second church in the settlement is dedicated to Saint Bartholomew.

== Notable people ==
Notable people that were born or lived in Cerkno include:

- France Bevk (1890–1970), writer
- Frančišek Borgia Sedej (1854–1931), Archbishop of Gorizia
- Milica Kacin-Wohinz (1930–2021), historian
- Boris Mlakar (born 1947), historian
- Franc Močnik (1814–1892), mathematician
- Janez Podobnik (born 1959), politician
- Marjan Podobnik (born 1960), politician
- Rafael Podobnik (born 1942), photographer

== See also ==
- Cerkno Ski Resort
