= Zapreval =

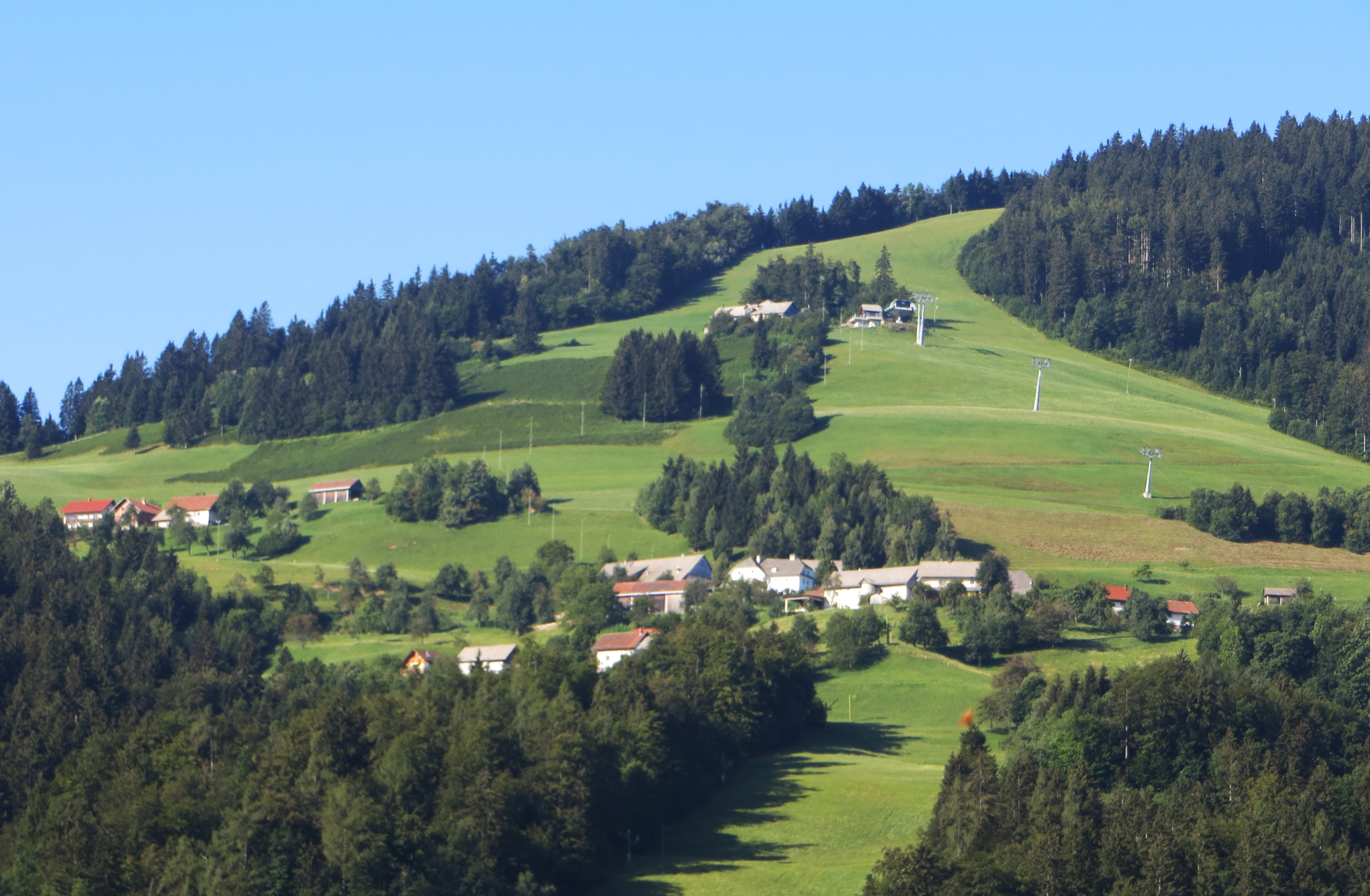

- Location in Slovenia
- Coordinates: 46°10′30.01″N 14°11′13.29″E
- Country: Slovenia
- Traditional region: Upper Carniola
- Statistical region: Upper Carniola
- Municipality: Gorenja Vas–Poljane

Area
  - Total: 1.33 km^{2} (0.51 sq mi)
- Elevation: 860.4 m (2,823 ft)

Population (2020)
  - Total: 30
  - Density: 23/km^{2} (58/sq mi)

Zapreval (pronounced [zaˈpɾeːʋal]; in older sources also Zaprevolam, German: Saprevolam) is a dispersed settlement in the Škofja Loka Hills in the Municipality of Gorenja Vas–Poljane in the Upper Carniola region of Slovenia.

== Name ==
Zapreval was attested in historical sources as Prewalt in 1291, Prewal in 1453, and Dolenigriboitzi and Gorenigriboitzi in 1500, among other names and spellings. The name is a fused prepositional phrase that has lost case inflection, from za 'behind' + Preval (literally, 'crest, mountain pass'), referring to its position behind Preval Hill (elevation 924 meters or 3,031 feet) southeast of the village. Locally, the village is also known as za Prevalom, and the name also appears reduced through apocope as Zaprev.

== Recreation ==
Zapreval lies by the Stari Vrh ski slopes with fifty hectares of slopes, a new 6-chair lift and 5 ski tows.
