= Soriška Planina Ski Resort =

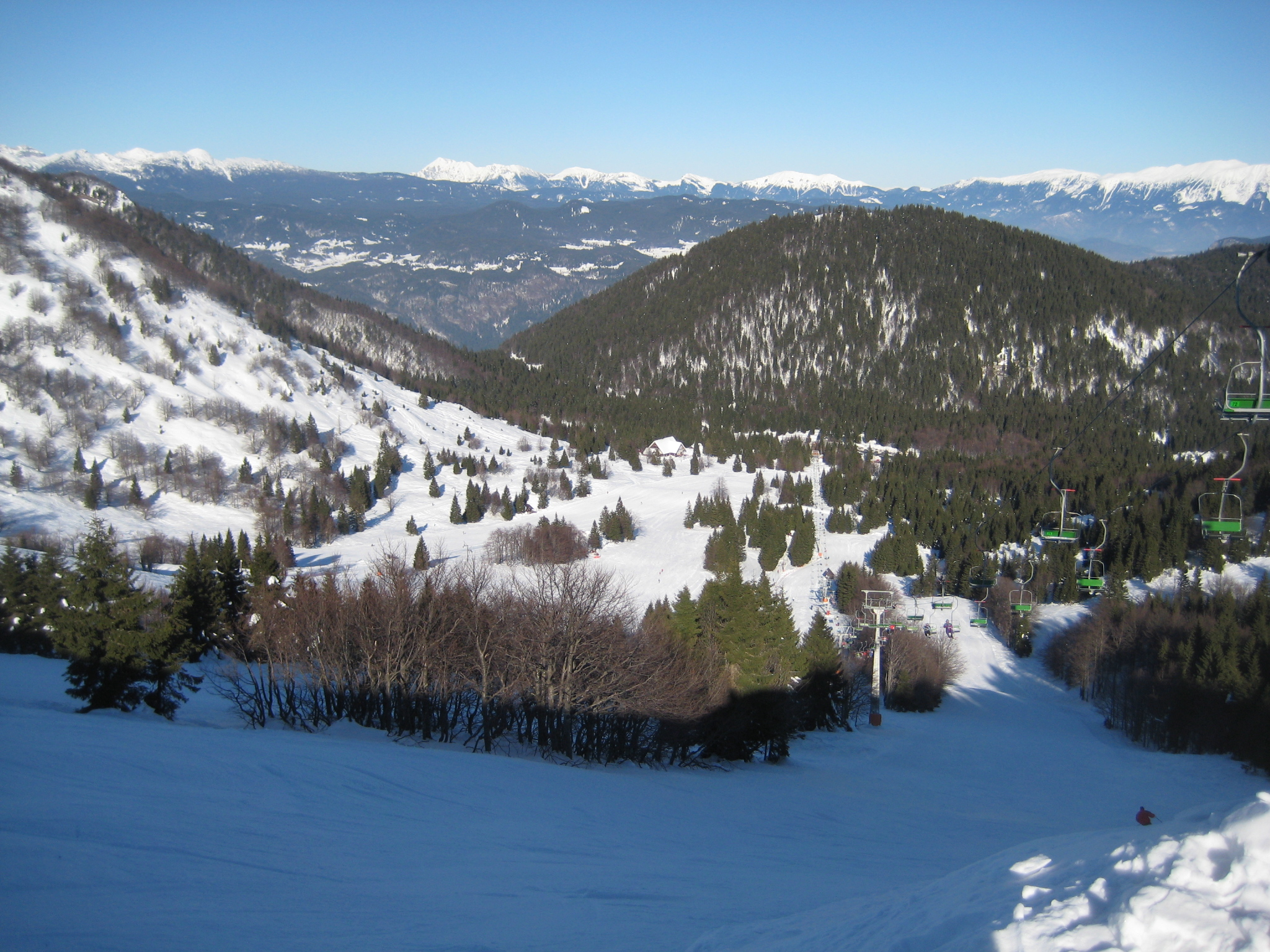
- Interactive map of Soriška Planina Ski Resort
- Location: Selca, Železniki; Slovenia
- Nearest city: Kranj
- Coordinates: 46.2402°N 14.0081°E
- Vertical: 157 m (515 ft)
- Top elevation: 1,550 m (5,090 ft)
- Base elevation: 1,307 m (4,288 ft)
- Skiable area: 62 acres (0.25 km^{2})
- Trails: Total 7,5 km 3 km 2 km 1,5 km
- Longest run: 15 km (9.3 mi)
- Lift system: 4 total 1 doublechair 3 surface
- Website: soriška-planina.si

Soriška Planina Ski Resort is a family Slovenian ski resort located in municipality of Železniki. Closest city is Kranj and 60 km away from Ljubljana.

Resort offers has 6 km of ski slopes (slalom, giantslalom and downhill slope,...) and 5 km of cross-country skiing tracks. There is also a natural sledding slope and one sledding slope for competitions. You can be hiking in summer.

== Resort statistics ==
Elevation
Summit - 1600 m / 5,084 ft
Base - 1000 m / 4,287 ft

Ski Terrain
0,25 km^{2} (62 acres) - covering 6 km (3.7 mi) of ski slopes on one mountain.

Slope Difficulty
-expert (1 km)
-intermediate (2 km)
-beginner (3 km)

Vertical Drop
- 157 m / (515 ft) in total

Longest Run: 1,64 km

Average Winter Daytime Temperature:

Average Annual Snowfall:

Lift Capacity: 3,500 skiers per hour (all together)

Ski Season Opens: December

Ski Season Ends: March

Snow Conditions Phone Line: +386 0 (4) 5117835

== Ski lifts ==
Name	Length
Lajnar (two-chair)	1160m
Slatnik (surface)	925m
Sedlo (surface)	680m
Lajnar (surface)	758m
