= Ribnica na Pohorju =

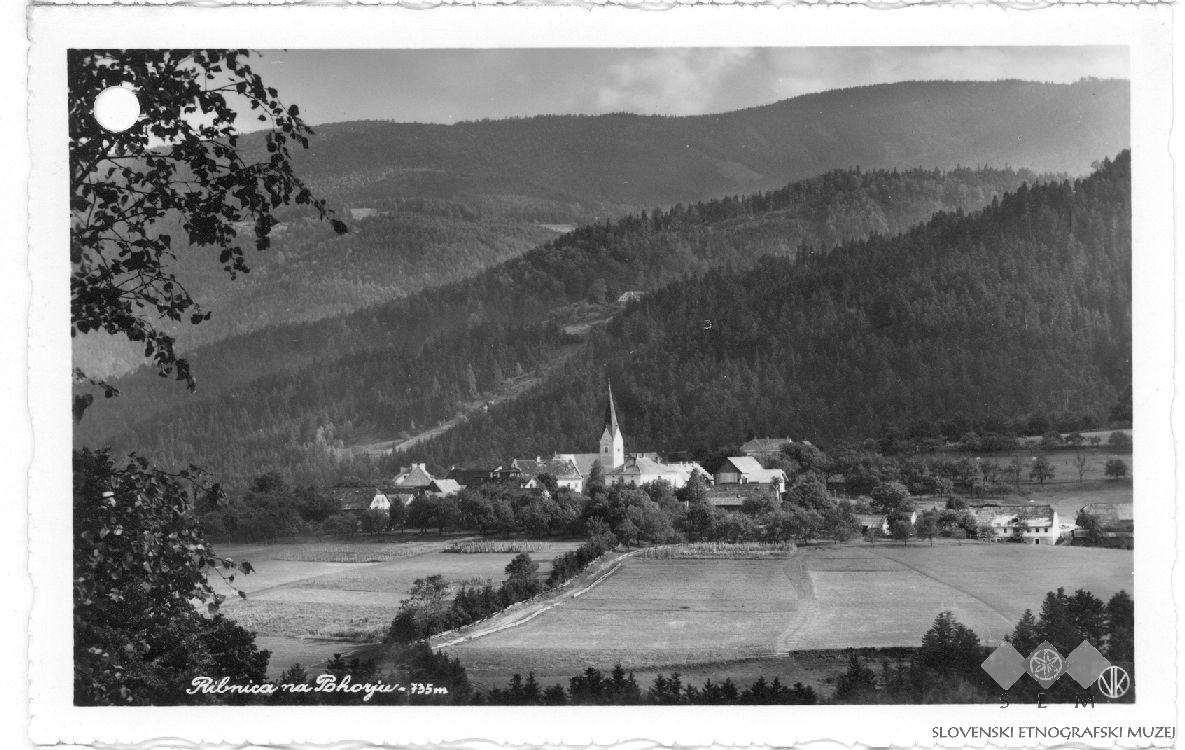

- Location in Slovenia
- Coordinates: 46°32′14″N 15°16′24″E
- Country: Slovenia
- Traditional region: Styria
- Statistical region: Carinthia
- Municipality: Ribnica na Pohorju

Area
  - Total: 5.20 km^{2} (2.01 sq mi)
- Elevation: 684.2 m (2,245 ft)

Population (2019)
  - Total: 404

Ribnica na Pohorju (pronounced [ˈɾíːbnitsa na ˈpóːxɔɾju]) is a settlement in northern Slovenia. It is the seat of the Municipality of Ribnica na Pohorju. It lies in the Pohorje Hills west of Maribor. The area is part of the traditional region of Styria. It is now included in the Carinthia Statistical Region.

== Name ==
Ribnica was attested in written sources in 1266 as Reyvinich (and as Reivinich and Reyvenz in 1283, and Reiffnik in 1319). The name was originally a hydronym derived from the common noun riba 'fish', thus referring to a stream with many fish and, by extension, a settlement along such a stream. The village was known as Reifnigg in German.

== Church ==
The parish church in the settlement is dedicated to Saint Bartholomew and belongs to the Roman Catholic Archdiocese of Maribor. It was first mentioned in written documents dating to 1356. The current building dates to around 1740. A second church near the settlement's main cemetery is dedicated to Saint Leonard and dates to the 15th century with 18th-century additions.
