= Pungert, Škofja Loka =

Pungert
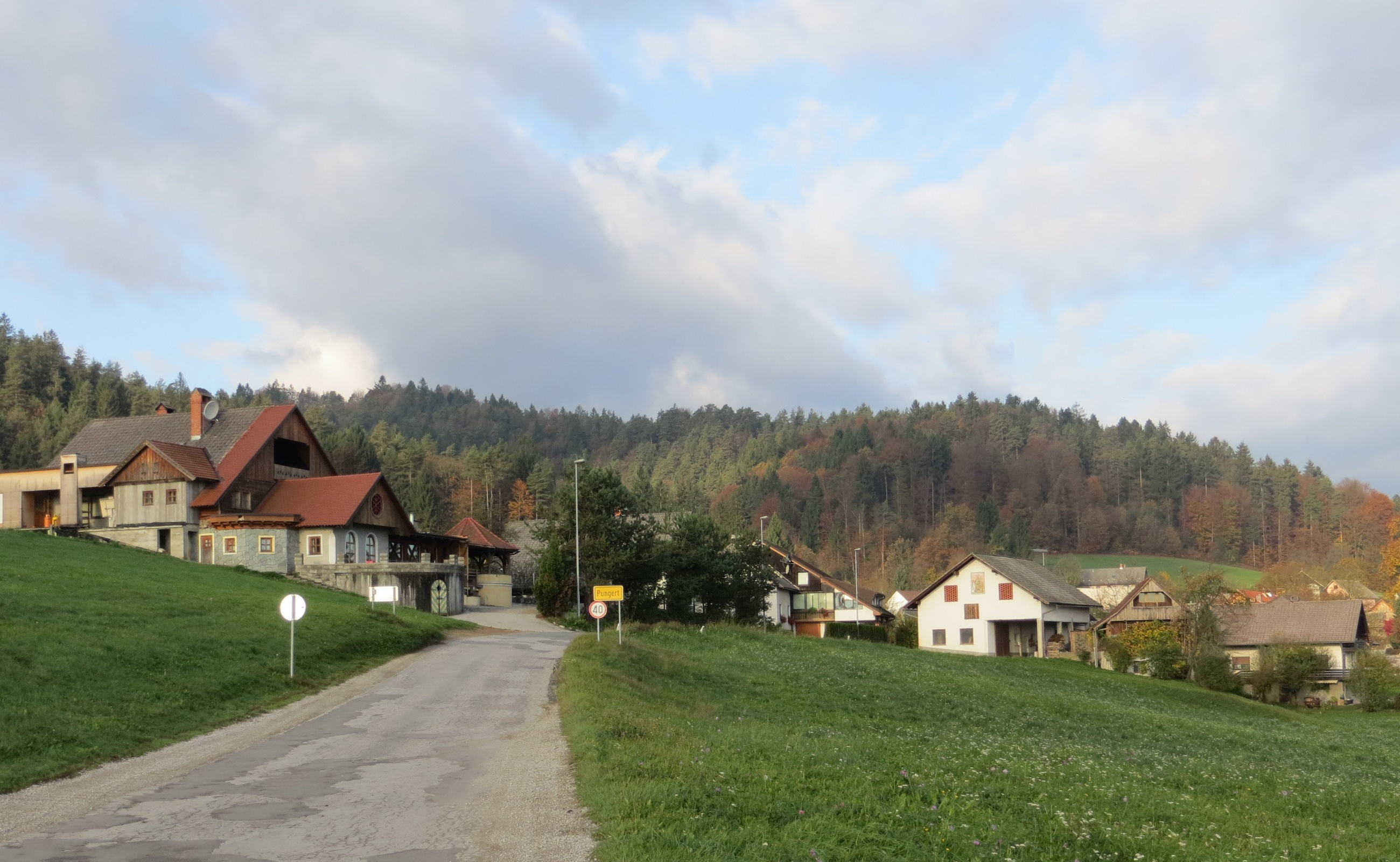

- Location in Slovenia
- Coordinates: 46°9′23.52″N 14°20′13.08″E
- Country: Slovenia
- Traditional region: Upper Carniola
- Statistical region: Upper Carniola
- Municipality: Škofja Loka

Area
  - Total: 1.78 km^{2} (0.69 sq mi)
- Elevation: 340.4 m (1,117 ft)

Population (2002)
  - Total: 125

Pungert (pronounced [ˈpuːŋɡɛɾt]) is a small settlement on the right bank of the Sora River in the Municipality of Škofja Loka in the Upper Carniola region of Slovenia.
