= Podpulfrca =

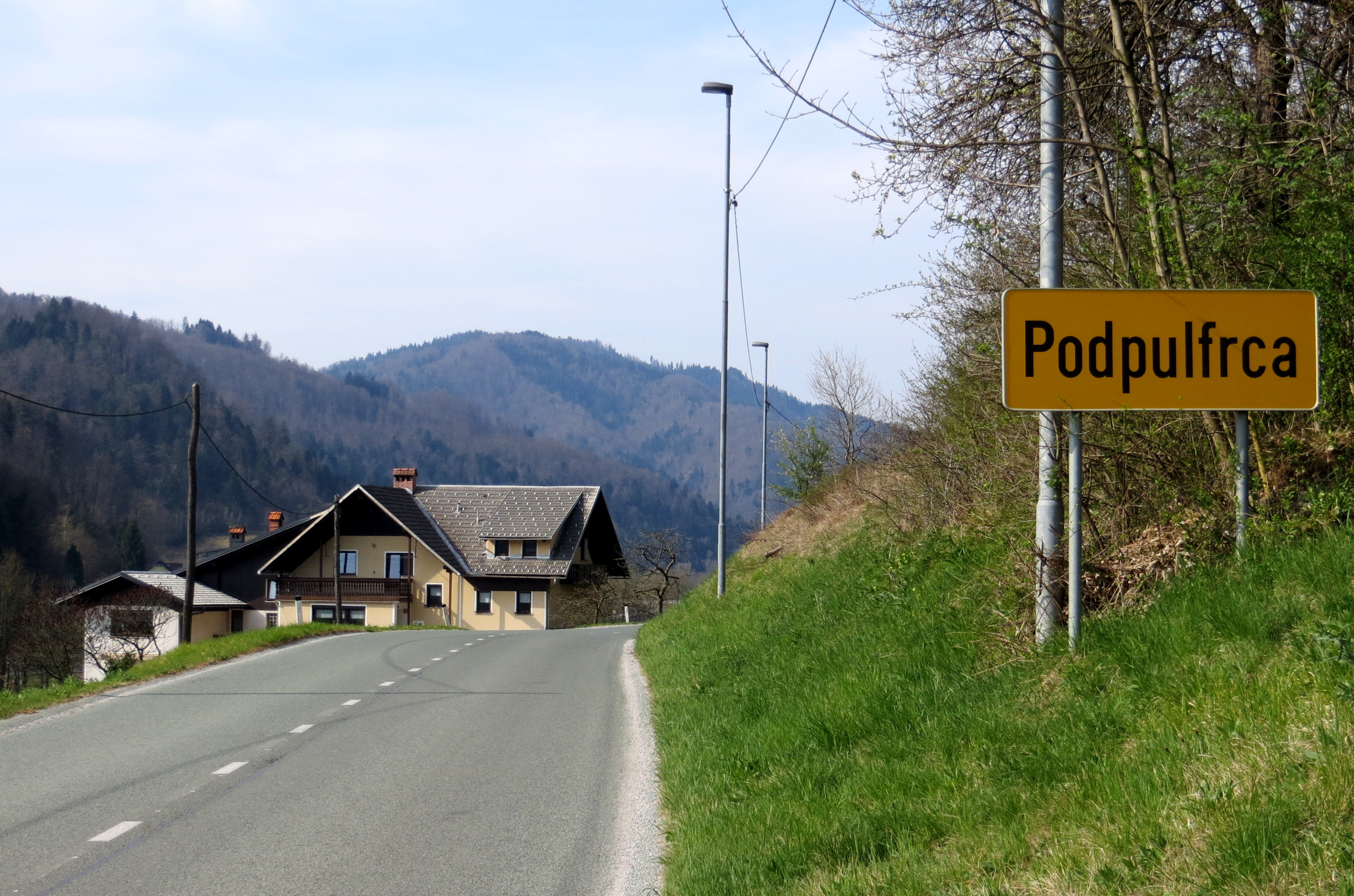

- Location in Slovenia
- Coordinates: 46°9′20.03″N 14°17′42.57″E
- Country: Slovenia
- Traditional region: Upper Carniola
- Statistical region: Upper Carniola
- Municipality: Škofja Loka

Area
  - Total: 0.46 km^{2} (0.18 sq mi)
- Elevation: 360 m (1,180 ft)

Population (2002)
  - Total: 38

Podpulfrca (pronounced [pɔtˈpuːlfəɾtsa], in older sources Podpurflica) is a small settlement in the Municipality of Škofja Loka in the Upper Carniola region of Slovenia.

== Name ==
Podpulfrca is also known as Podpurfelca in the local dialect. The name is a fused prepositional phrase: pod 'below' + pulfrca 'gunpowder mill'. The latter element refers to a stamp mill used for producing gunpowder that was located there, and in 1584 the name of the village was recorded as Pulferstamph 'gunpowder mill' (i.e., German Pulverstampf).
