= Trata, Škofja Loka =

Trata
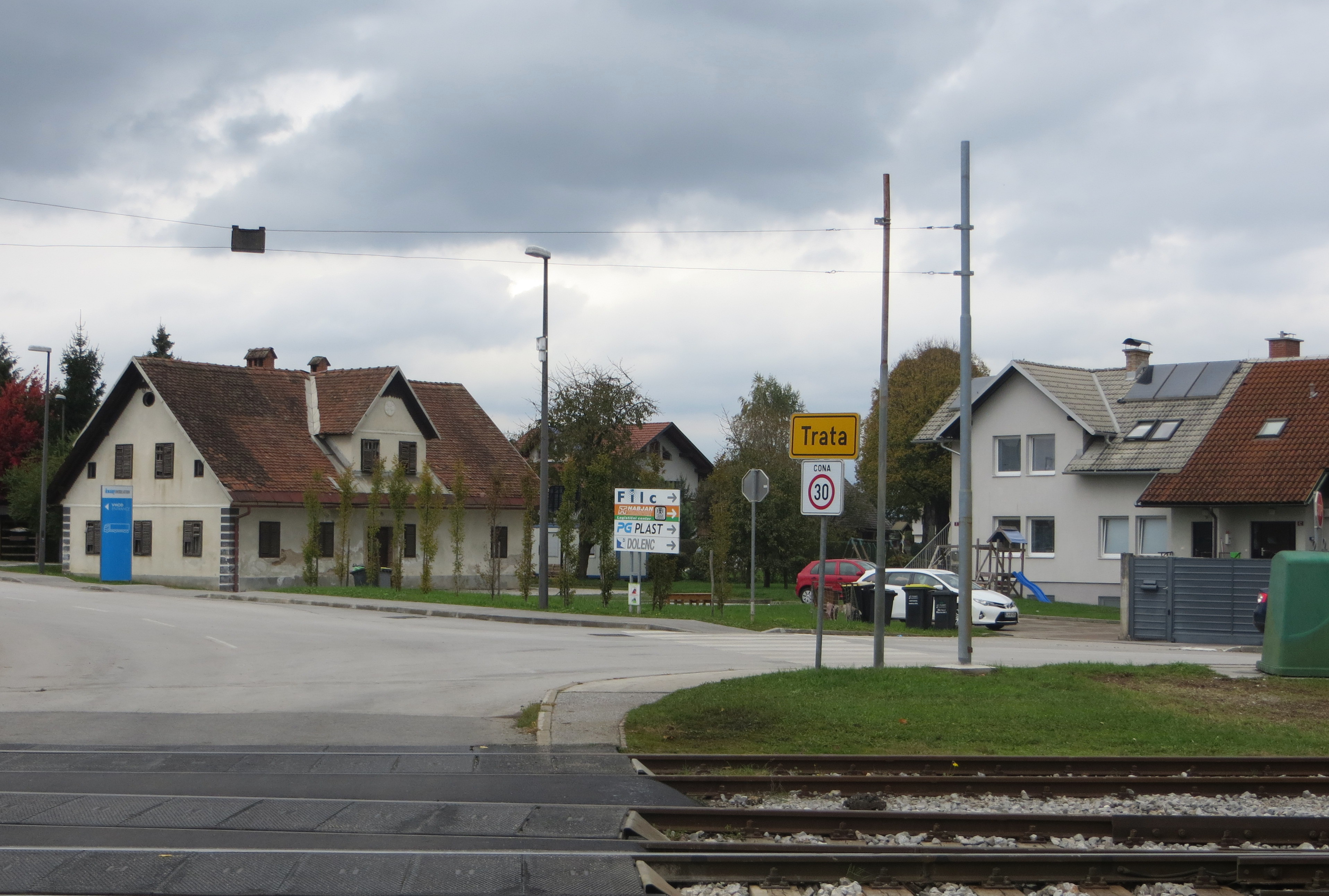

- Location in Slovenia
- Coordinates: 46°10′32.15″N 14°20′7.6″E
- Country: Slovenia
- Traditional region: Upper Carniola
- Statistical region: Upper Carniola
- Municipality: Škofja Loka

Area
  - Total: 1.24 km^{2} (0.48 sq mi)
- Elevation: 360.7 m (1,183 ft)

Population (2002)
  - Total: 163

Trata (pronounced [ˈtɾaːta]) is a settlement in the Municipality of Škofja Loka in the Upper Carniola region of Slovenia.

== Name ==
Trata was attested in historical sources as Tratarn in 1291 and as Traten before 1392. The place name Trata occurs several times in Slovenia. It is derived from the Slovene common noun trata 'small treeless meadow', which was borrowed from Middle High German trat 'meadow'.

== Notable people ==
Notable people that were born or lived in Trata include:

- Anton Dolinar (1894–1953), composer and musicologist
