= Virlog =

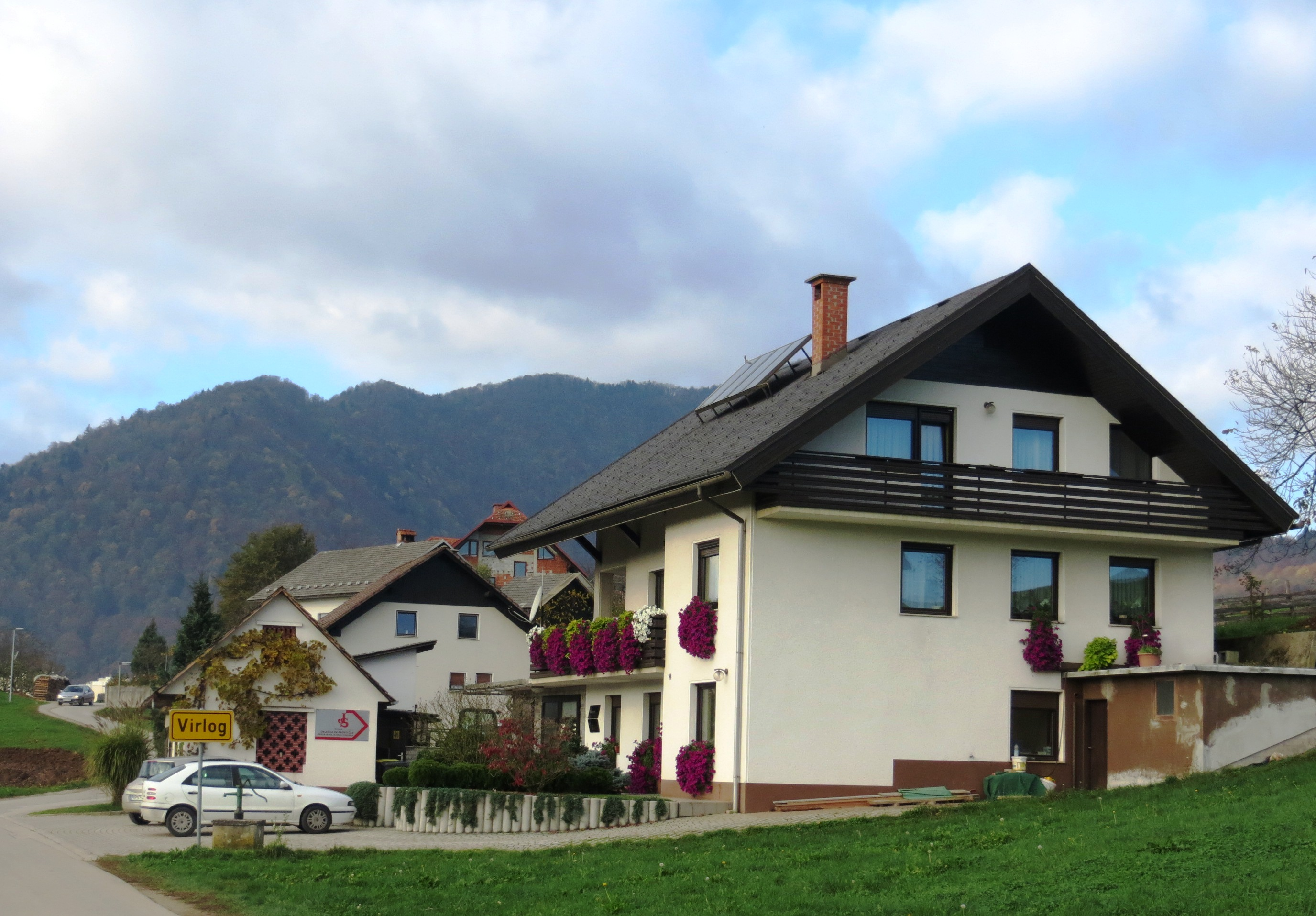

- Location in Slovenia
- Coordinates: 46°10′36.22″N 14°17′55.13″E
- Country: Slovenia
- Traditional region: Upper Carniola
- Statistical region: Upper Carniola
- Municipality: Škofja Loka

Area
  - Total: 0.58 km^{2} (0.22 sq mi)
- Elevation: 367.3 m (1,205 ft)

Population (2002)
  - Total: 100

Virlog (pronounced [ˈʋiːɾlɔk]; in older sources also Virloh, German: Werloch) is a settlement in the Municipality of Škofja Loka in the Upper Carniola region of Slovenia.
