= Zgornja Luša =

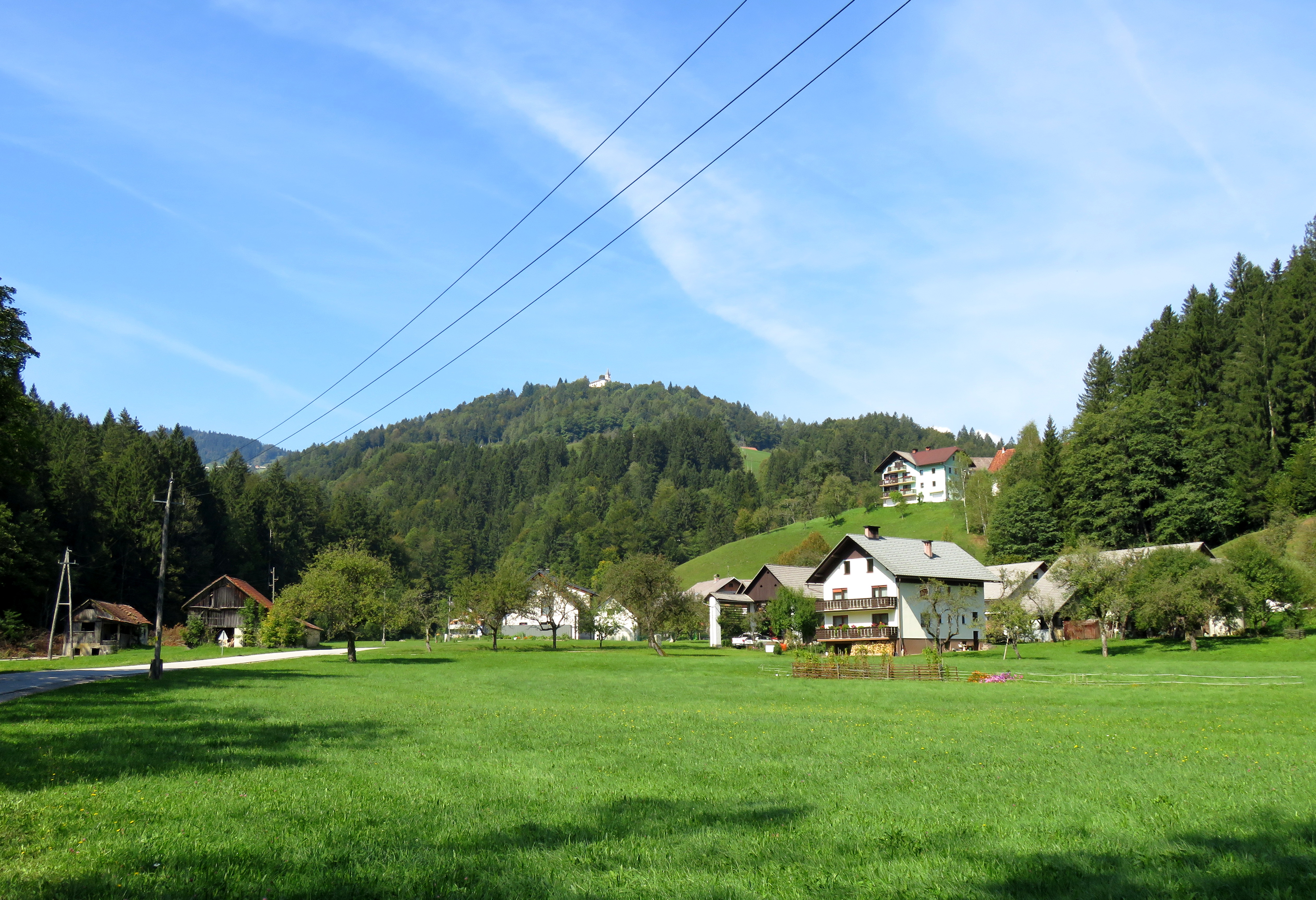

- Location in Slovenia
- Coordinates: 46°11′4.97″N 14°12′42.78″E
- Country: Slovenia
- Traditional region: Upper Carniola
- Statistical region: Upper Carniola
- Municipality: Škofja Loka

Area
  - Total: 1.68 km^{2} (0.65 sq mi)
- Elevation: 461 m (1,512 ft)

Population (2002)
  - Total: 98

Zgornja Luša (pronounced [ˈzɡoːɾnja ˈluːʃa]; German: Oberluscha) is a settlement in the Municipality of Škofja Loka in the Upper Carniola region of Slovenia.
