= Pozirno =

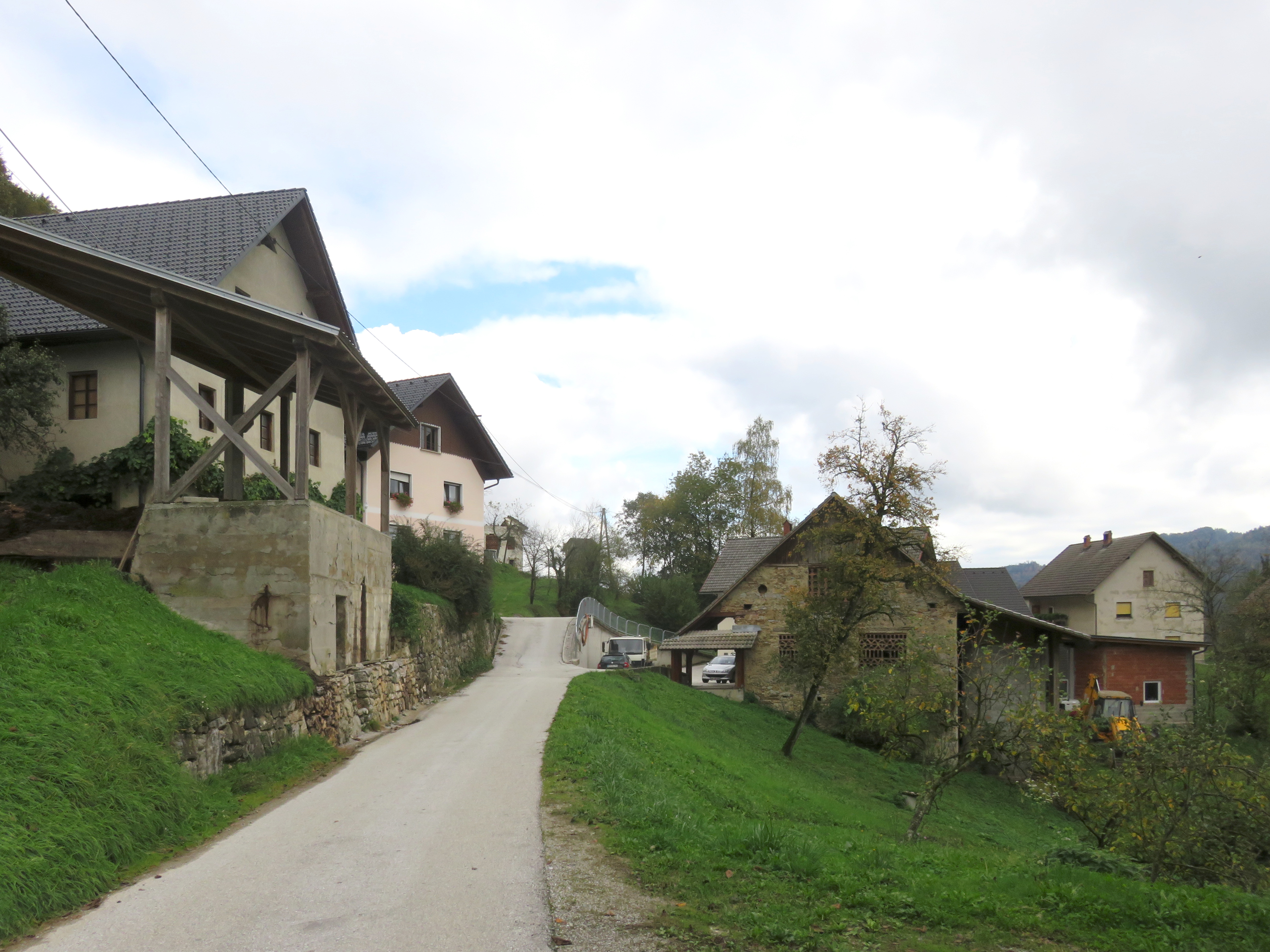

- Location in Slovenia
- Coordinates: 46°13′45.72″N 14°14′33.43″E
- Country: Slovenia
- Traditional region: Upper Carniola
- Statistical region: Upper Carniola
- Municipality: Škofja Loka

Area
  - Total: 2.03 km^{2} (0.78 sq mi)
- Elevation: 610.50 m (2,003.0 ft)

Population (2002)
  - Total: 27

Pozirno (pronounced [pɔˈziːɾnɔ]) is a small settlement in the Municipality of Škofja Loka in the Upper Carniola region of Slovenia.
