= Stirpnik =

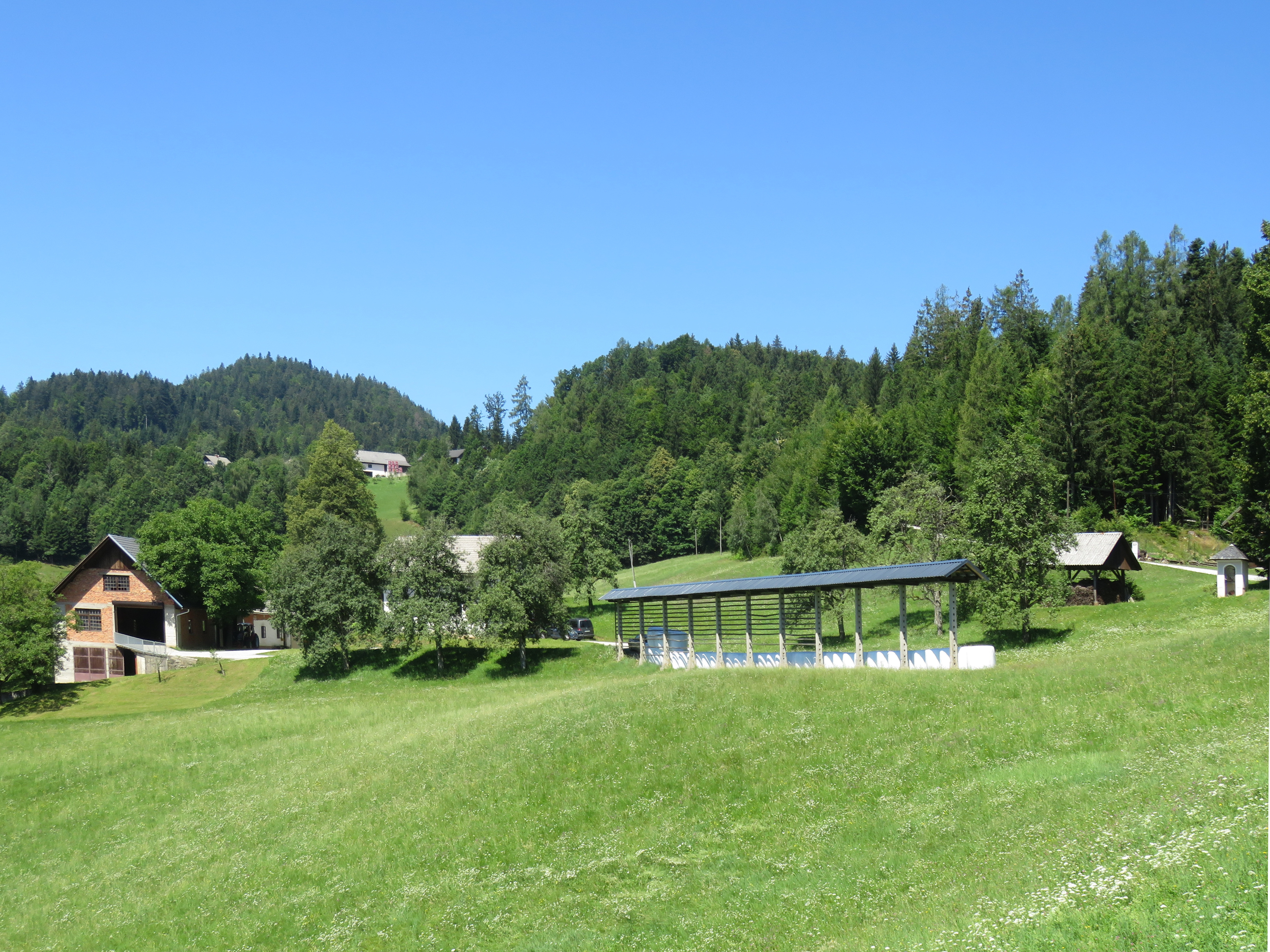

- Location in Slovenia
- Coordinates: 46°11′49.58″N 14°12′30.48″E
- Country: Slovenia
- Traditional region: Upper Carniola
- Statistical region: Upper Carniola
- Municipality: Škofja Loka

Area
  - Total: 1.99 km^{2} (0.77 sq mi)
- Elevation: 744.1 m (2,441 ft)

Population (2002)
  - Total: 80

Stirpnik (pronounced [ˈstiːɾpnik]) is a small settlement in the Municipality of Škofja Loka in the Upper Carniola region of Slovenia.
