= Gosteče =

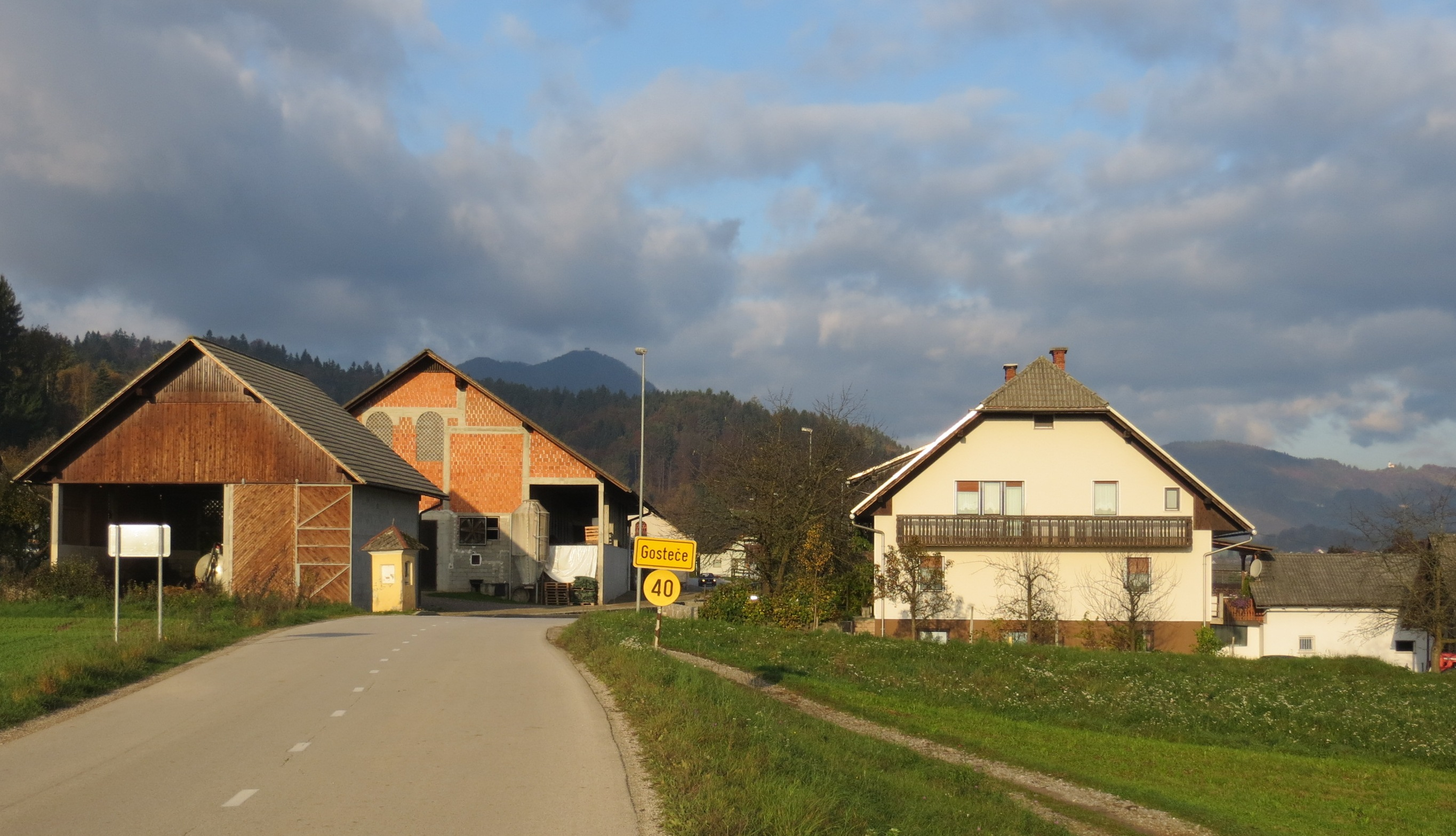

- Location in Slovenia
- Coordinates: 46°9′13.96″N 14°20′40.69″E
- Country: Slovenia
- Traditional region: Upper Carniola
- Statistical region: Upper Carniola
- Municipality: Škofja Loka

Area
  - Total: 2.10 km^{2} (0.81 sq mi)
- Elevation: 337.9 m (1,109 ft)

Population (2002)
  - Total: 74

Gosteče (pronounced [ɡɔˈsteːtʃɛ]) is a village on a river terrace on the right bank of the Sora River in the Municipality of Škofja Loka in the Upper Carniola region of Slovenia.

== Church ==
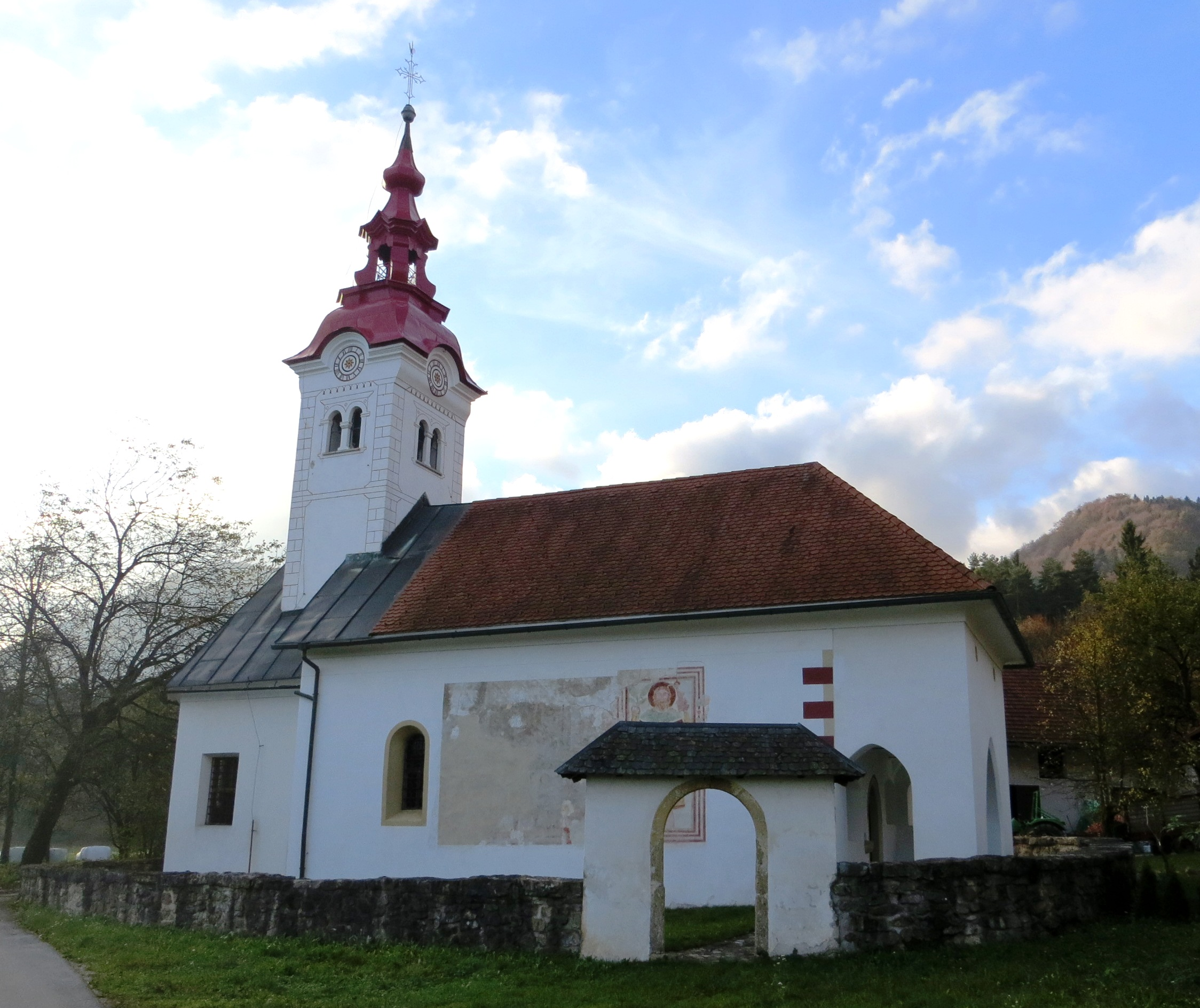
View from north

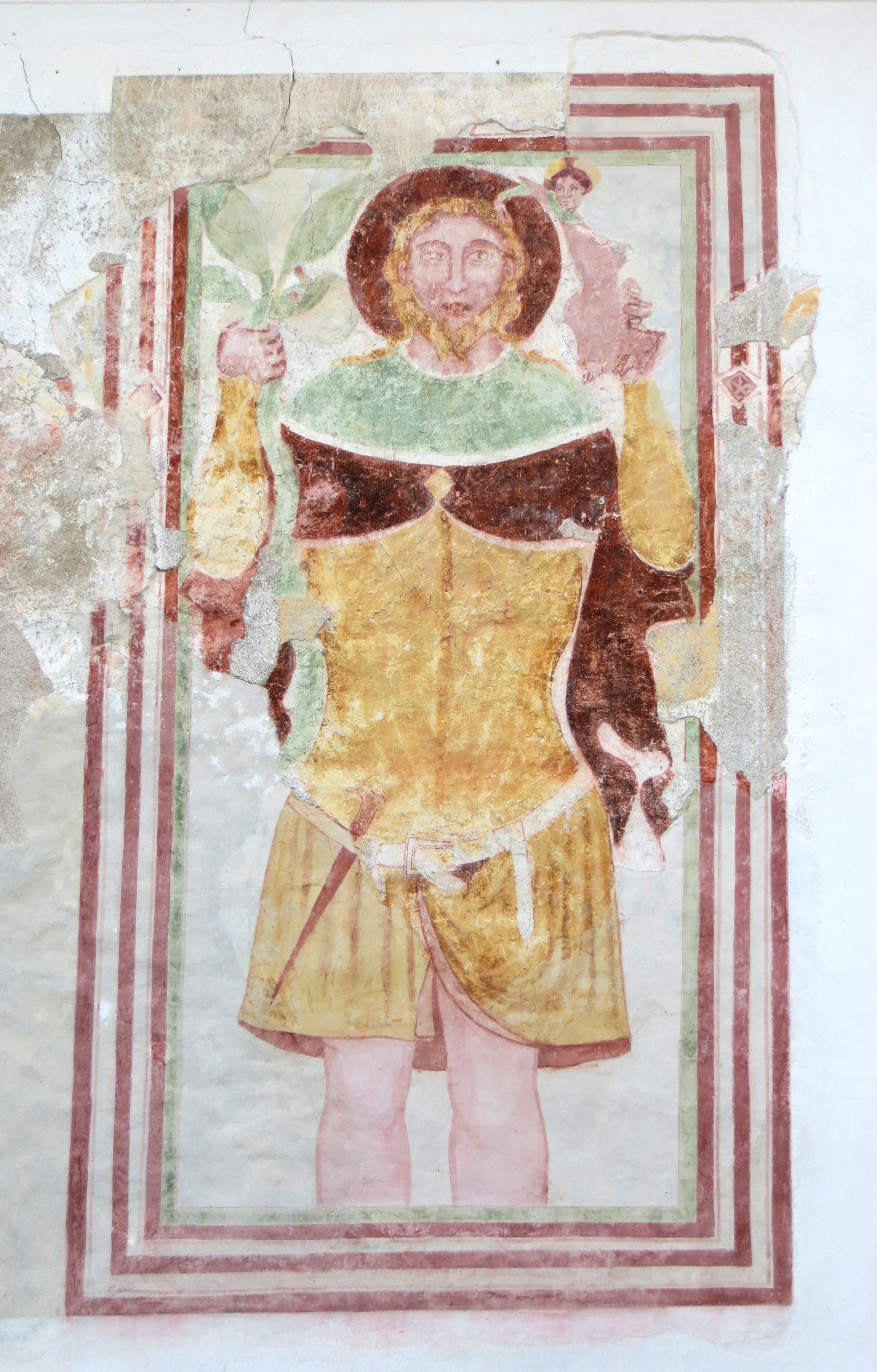
Exterior fresco

Saint Andrew's Church

The local church is dedicated to Saint Andrew. The exterior features several frescoes, including a 14th-century depiction of Saint Christopher.
