= Ševlje =

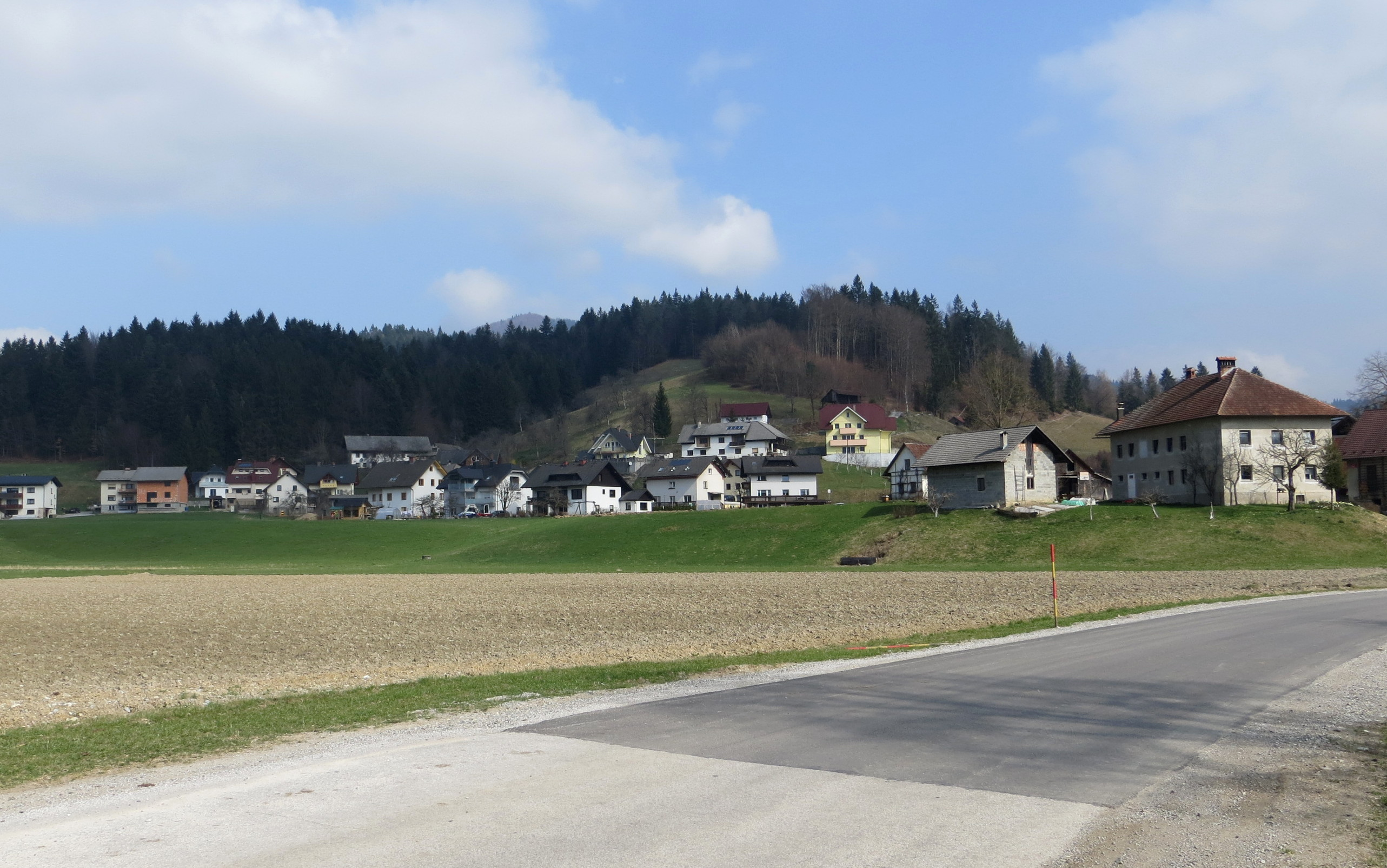

- Location in Slovenia
- Coordinates: 46°12′27.61″N 14°14′26.1″E
- Country: Slovenia
- Traditional region: Upper Carniola
- Statistical region: Upper Carniola
- Municipality: Škofja Loka

Area
  - Total: 4.20 km^{2} (1.62 sq mi)
- Elevation: 404.7 m (1,328 ft)

Population (2002)
  - Total: 201

Ševlje (pronounced [ˈʃeːu̯ljɛ]) is a village in the Municipality of Škofja Loka in the Upper Carniola region of Slovenia.
