= Papirnica =

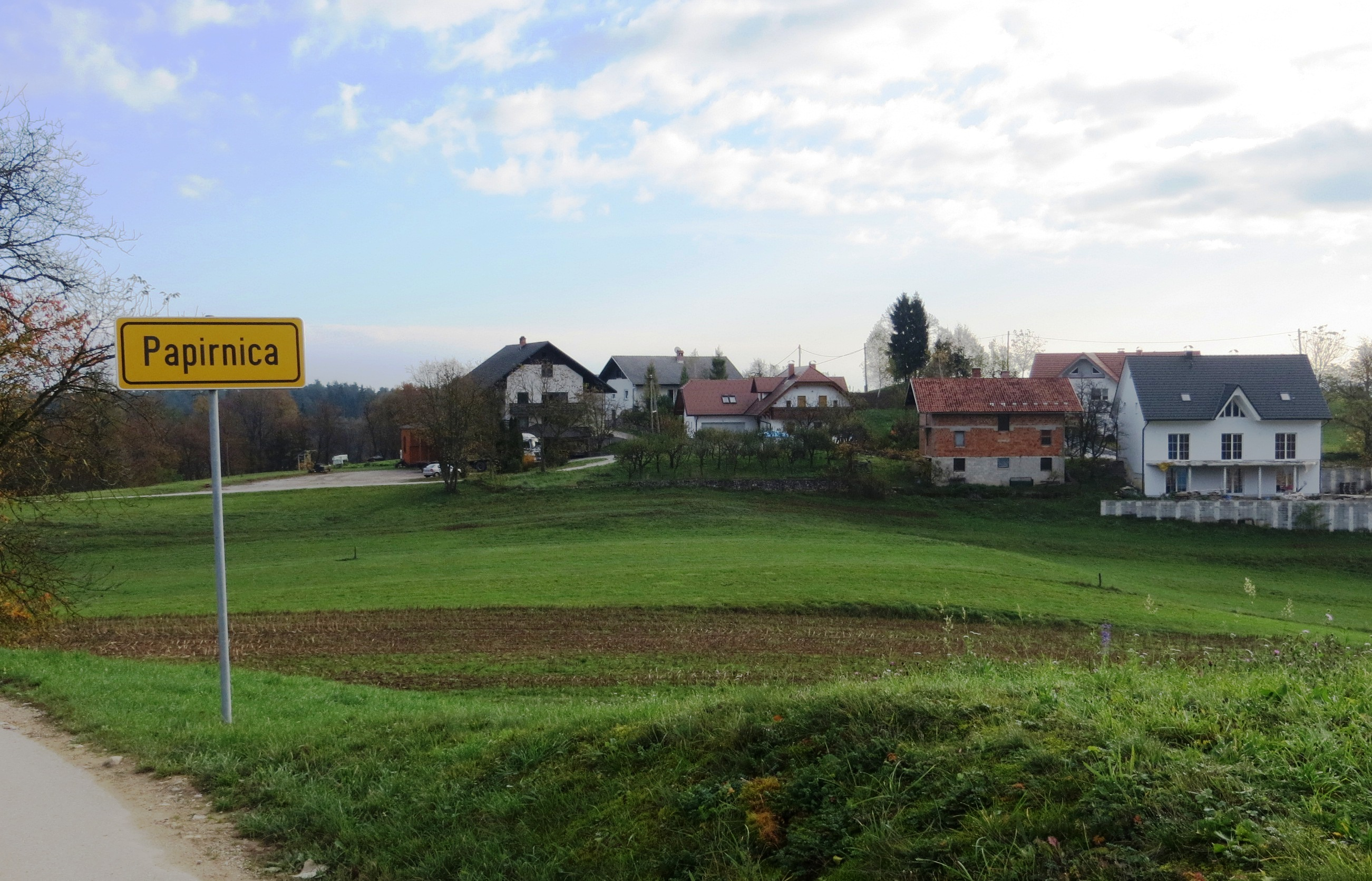

- Location in Slovenia
- Coordinates: 46°10′56.84″N 14°18′29.84″E
- Country: Slovenia
- Traditional region: Upper Carniola
- Statistical region: Upper Carniola
- Municipality: Škofja Loka

Area
  - Total: 0.35 km^{2} (0.14 sq mi)
- Elevation: 381.8 m (1,253 ft)

Population (2002)
  - Total: 61

Papirnica (pronounced [paˈpiːɾnitsa]) is a settlement in the Municipality of Škofja Loka in the Upper Carniola region of Slovenia.

== Name ==
The name Papirnica literally means 'paper factory'. In the 18th century paper was manufactured at the Pirman farm in the village.
