= Moškrin =

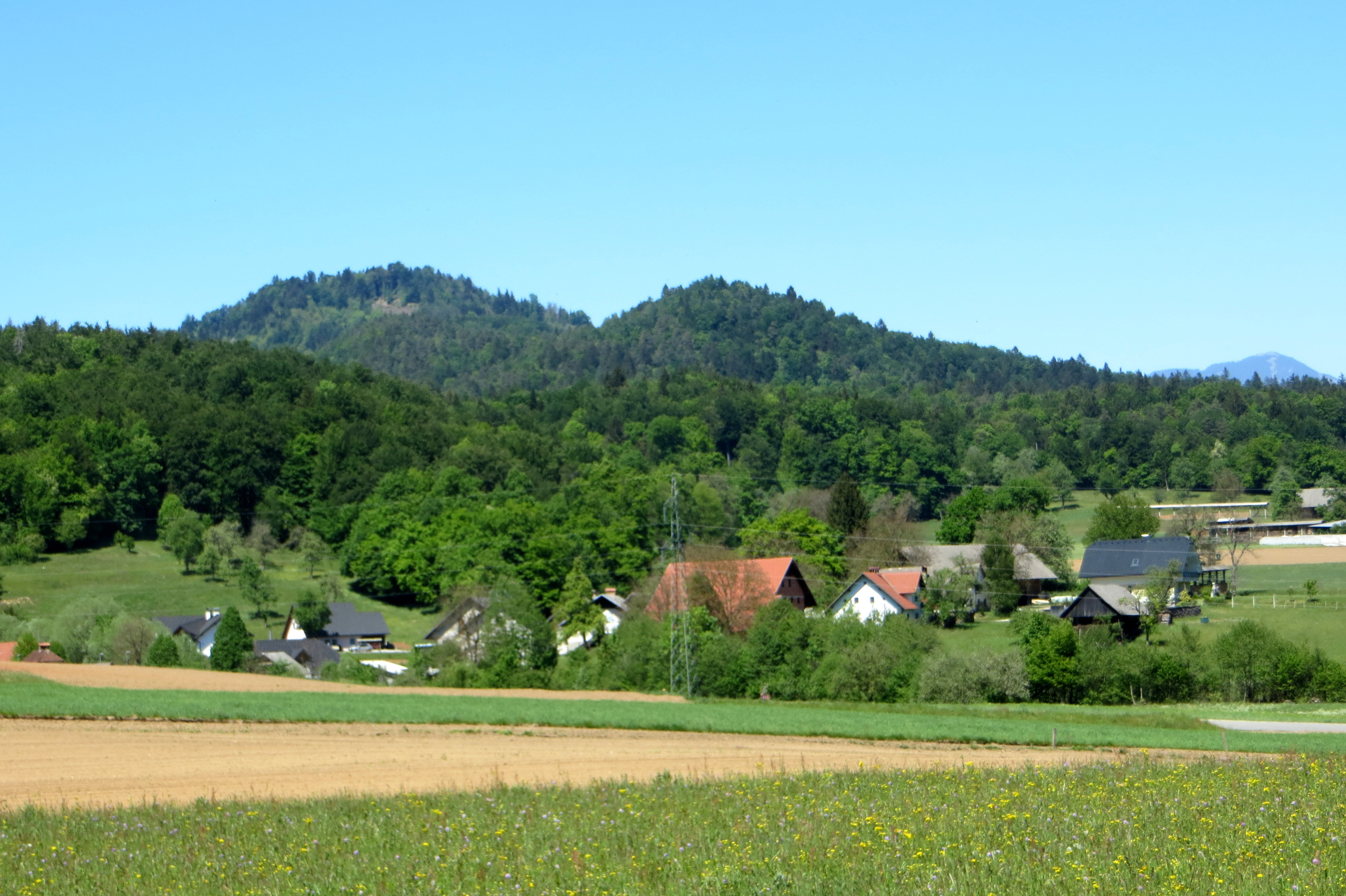

- Location in Slovenia
- Coordinates: 46°11′11.1″N 14°17′38.36″E
- Country: Slovenia
- Traditional region: Upper Carniola
- Statistical region: Upper Carniola
- Municipality: Škofja Loka

Area
  - Total: 1.04 km^{2} (0.40 sq mi)
- Elevation: 382.2 m (1,254 ft)

Population (2002)
  - Total: 20

Moškrin (pronounced [mɔˈʃkɾiːn]) is a small settlement in the Municipality of Škofja Loka in the Upper Carniola region of Slovenia.
