= Gabrška Gora =

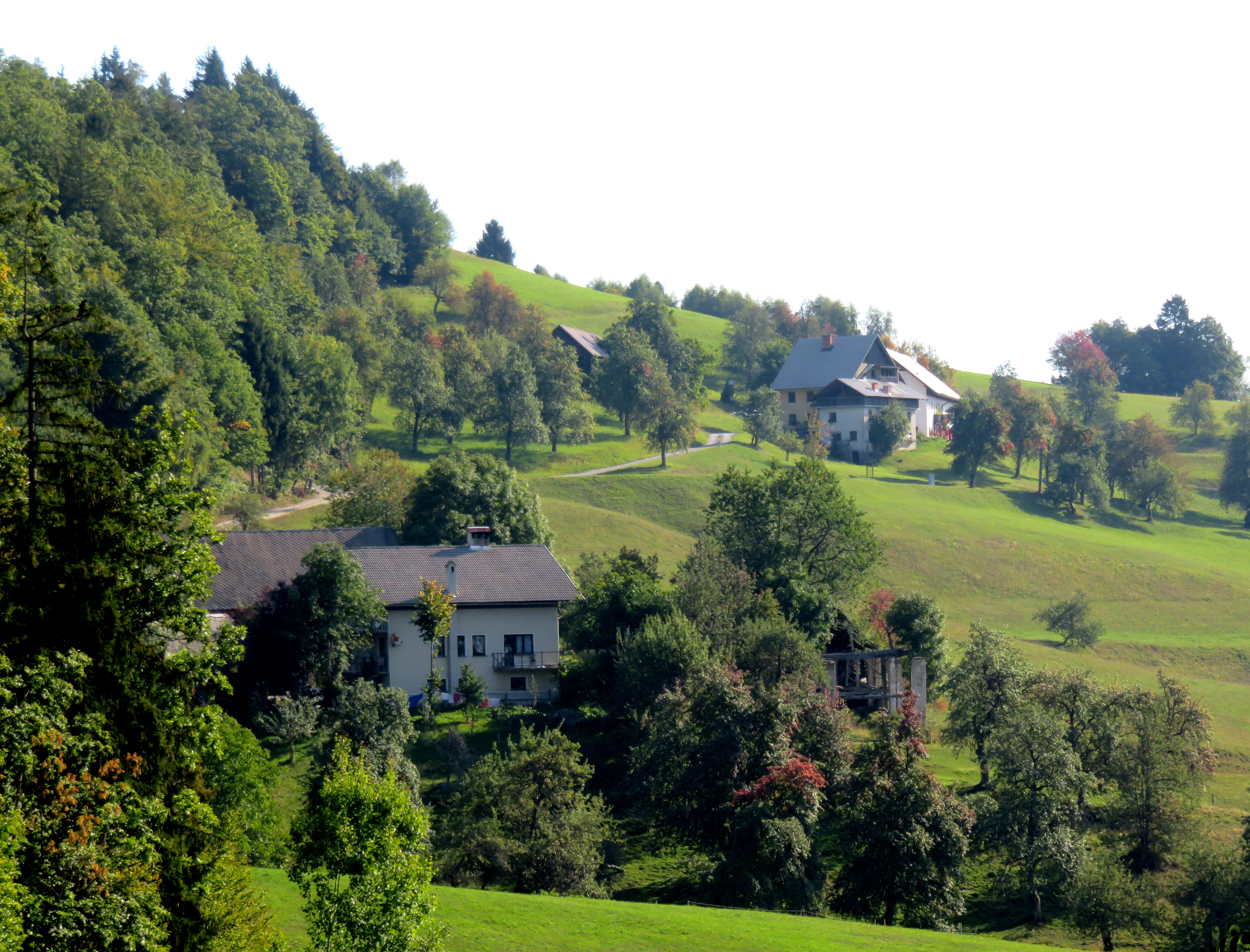

- Location in Slovenia
- Coordinates: 46°8′36.55″N 14°12′32.77″E
- Country: Slovenia
- Traditional region: Upper Carniola
- Statistical region: Upper Carniola
- Municipality: Škofja Loka

Area
  - Total: 1.95 km^{2} (0.75 sq mi)
- Elevation: 861.8 m (2,827 ft)

Population (2002)
  - Total: 60

Gabrška Gora (pronounced [ˈɡaːbəɾʃka ˈɡɔːɾa]) is a settlement in the Municipality of Škofja Loka in the Upper Carniola region of Slovenia.

== Church ==
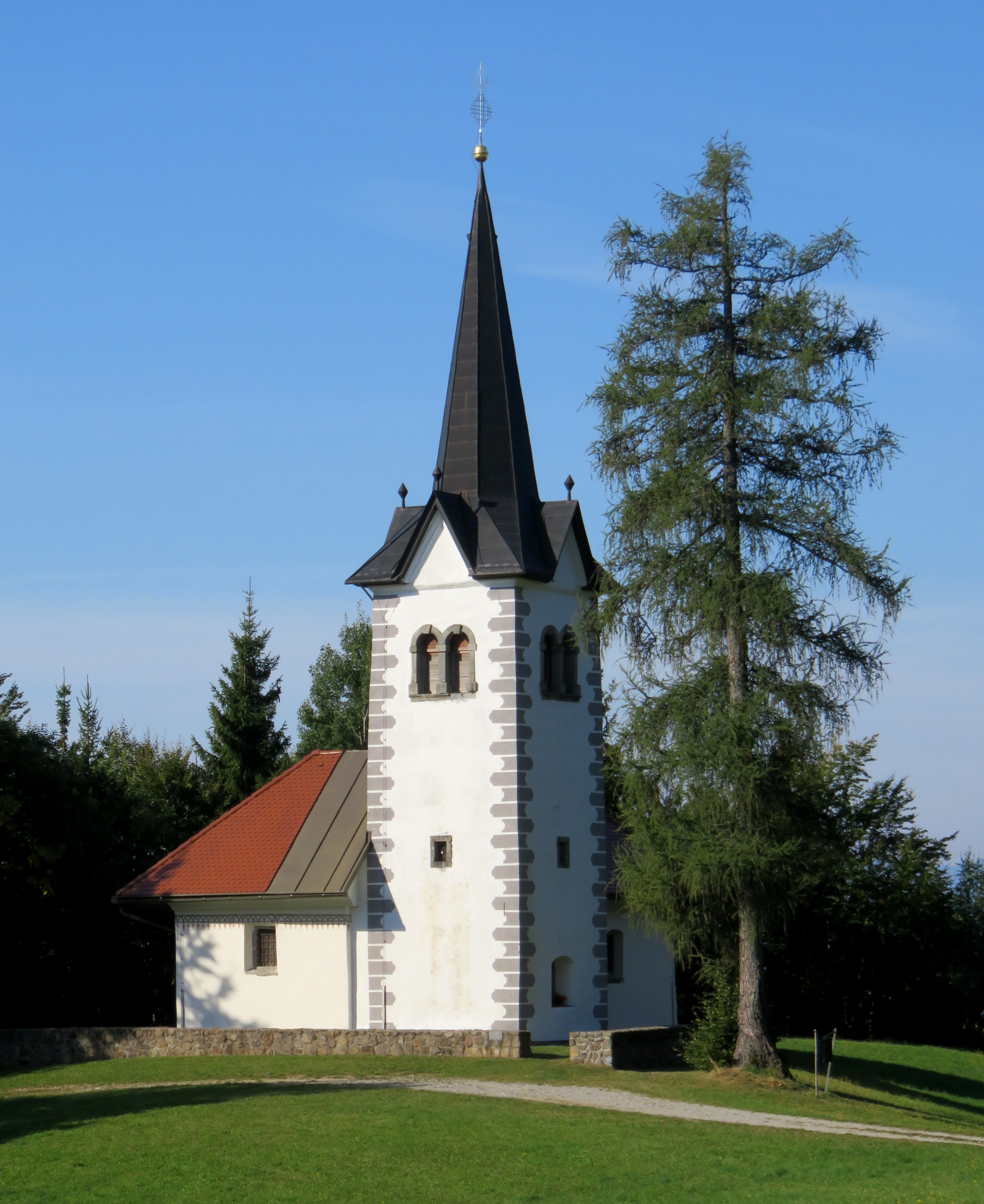
Saint Primus and Felician Church

The local church on a hill above the settlement is dedicated to Saints Primus and Felician. It has 13th-century Romanesque origins, but was rebuilt several times. The main altar is from 1911 with two side altars from the early 19th and 20th centuries. Its bell dates from 1719.
