= Sveti Tomaž, Škofja Loka =

Sveti Tomaž Tomaž nad Praprotnim (1955–2000)
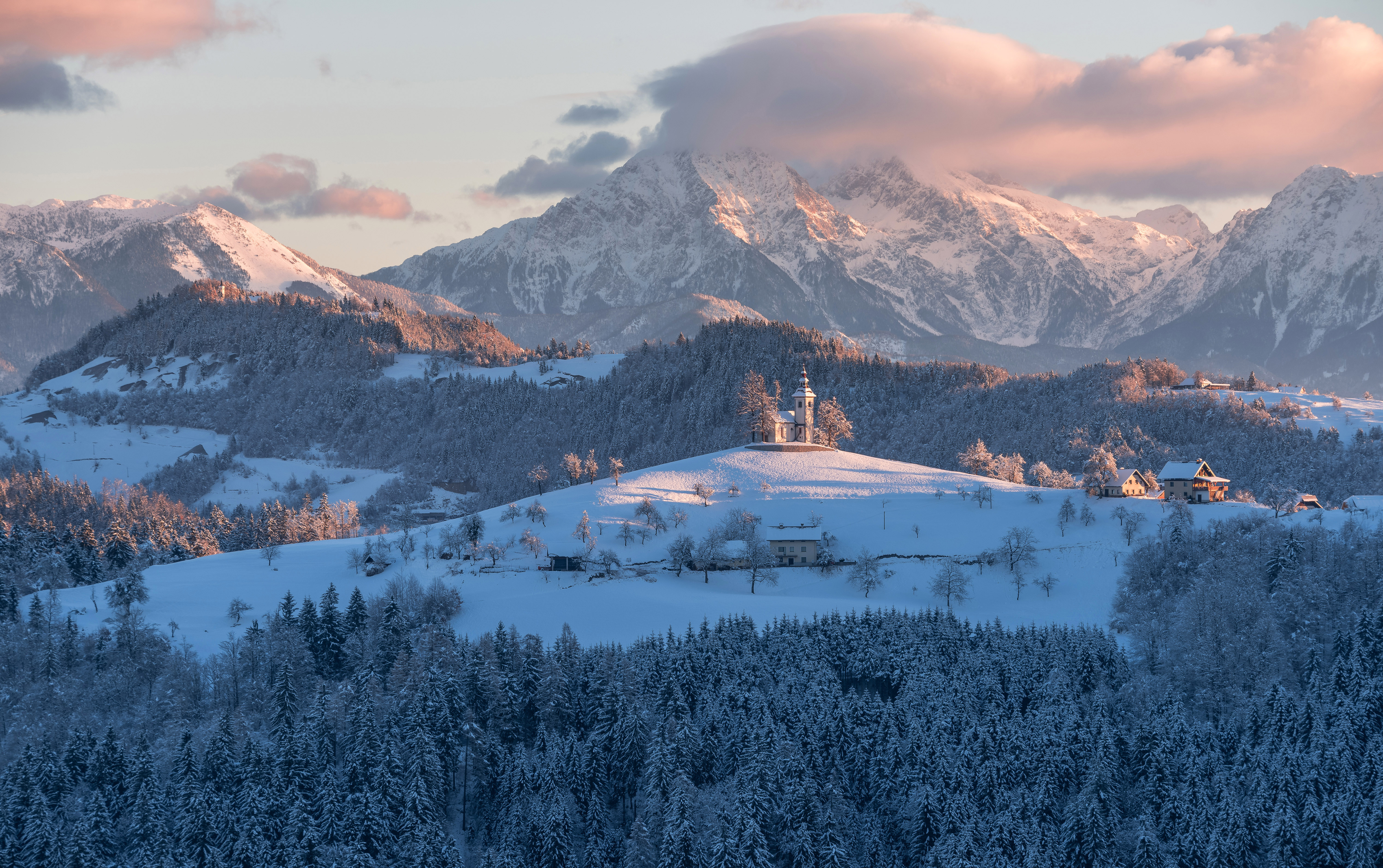

- Location in Slovenia
- Coordinates: 46°11′2.53″N 14°14′41.73″E
- Country: Slovenia
- Traditional region: Upper Carniola
- Statistical region: Upper Carniola
- Municipality: Škofja Loka

Area
  - Total: 1.11 km^{2} (0.43 sq mi)
- Elevation: 647.8 m (2,125 ft)

Population (2002)
  - Total: 55

Sveti Tomaž (pronounced [ˈsʋeːti tɔˈmaːʃ]; German: Sankt Thomas) is a small settlement in the Municipality of Škofja Loka in the Upper Carniola region of Slovenia.

== Name ==
The name of the settlement was changed from Sveti Tomaž (literally, 'Saint Thomas') to Tomaž nad Praprotnim (literally, 'Thomas above Praprotno') in 1955. The name was changed on the basis of the 1948 Law on Names of Settlements and Designations of Squares, Streets, and Buildings as part of efforts by Slovenia's postwar communist government to remove religious elements from toponyms. The name Sveti Tomaž was restored in 2000. In the past the German name was Sankt Thomas.

== Church ==
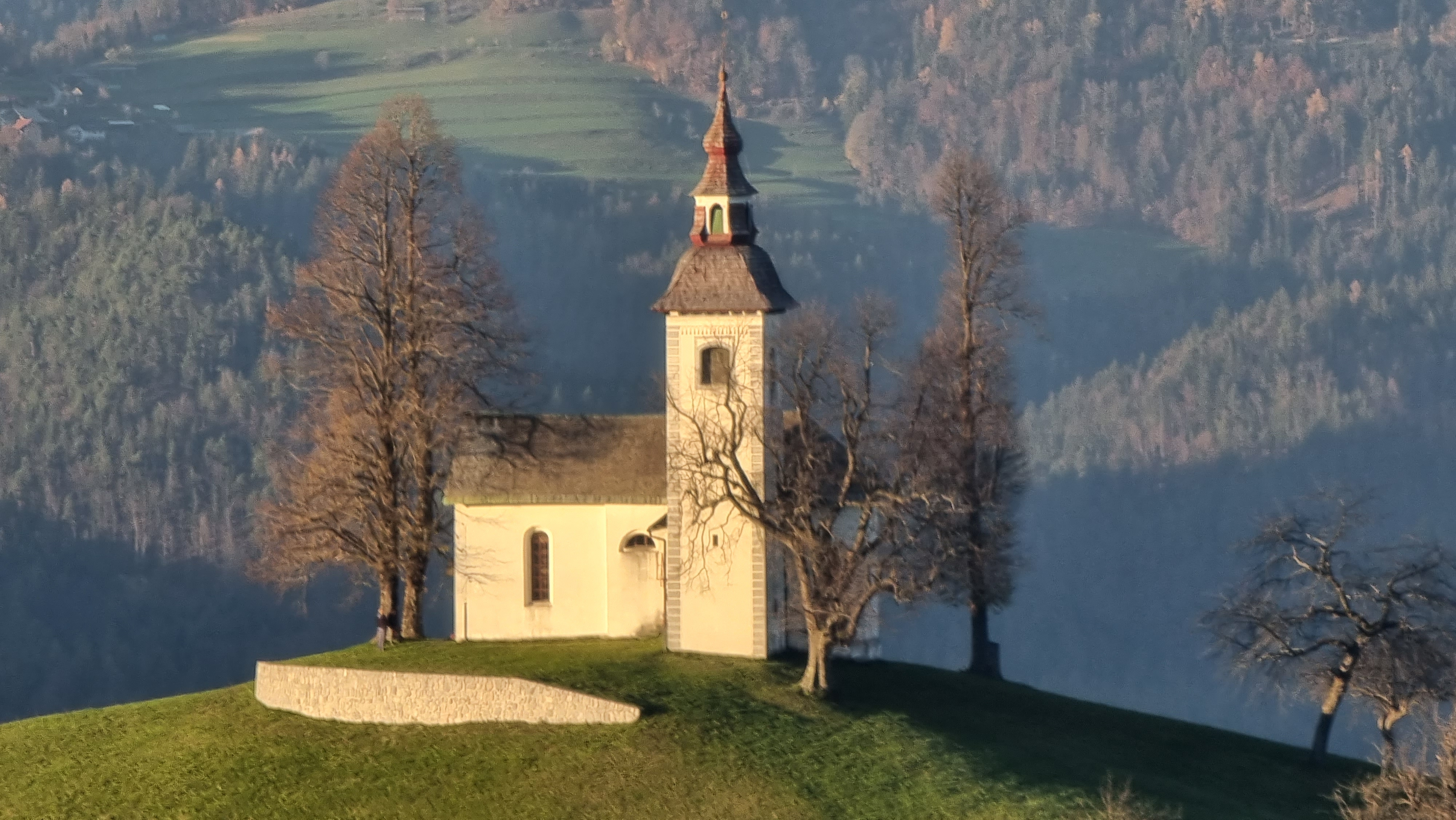
Saint Thomas's Church

The original church in the settlement, dedicated to Saint Thomas, was a Romanesque structure with a square nave and a rounded apse. The remains of this are still visible in the corner of the sanctuary. The surviving sanctuary is mostly Gothic, dating to around 1500. The church was rebuilt a number of times, most extensively in 1848 when three layers of frescos were revealed, the oldest dating to the early 14th century, the second layer to around 1400, and the top layer to the early 16th century.
