= Log nad Škofjo Loko =

Log nad Škofjo Loko Log (until 1955)
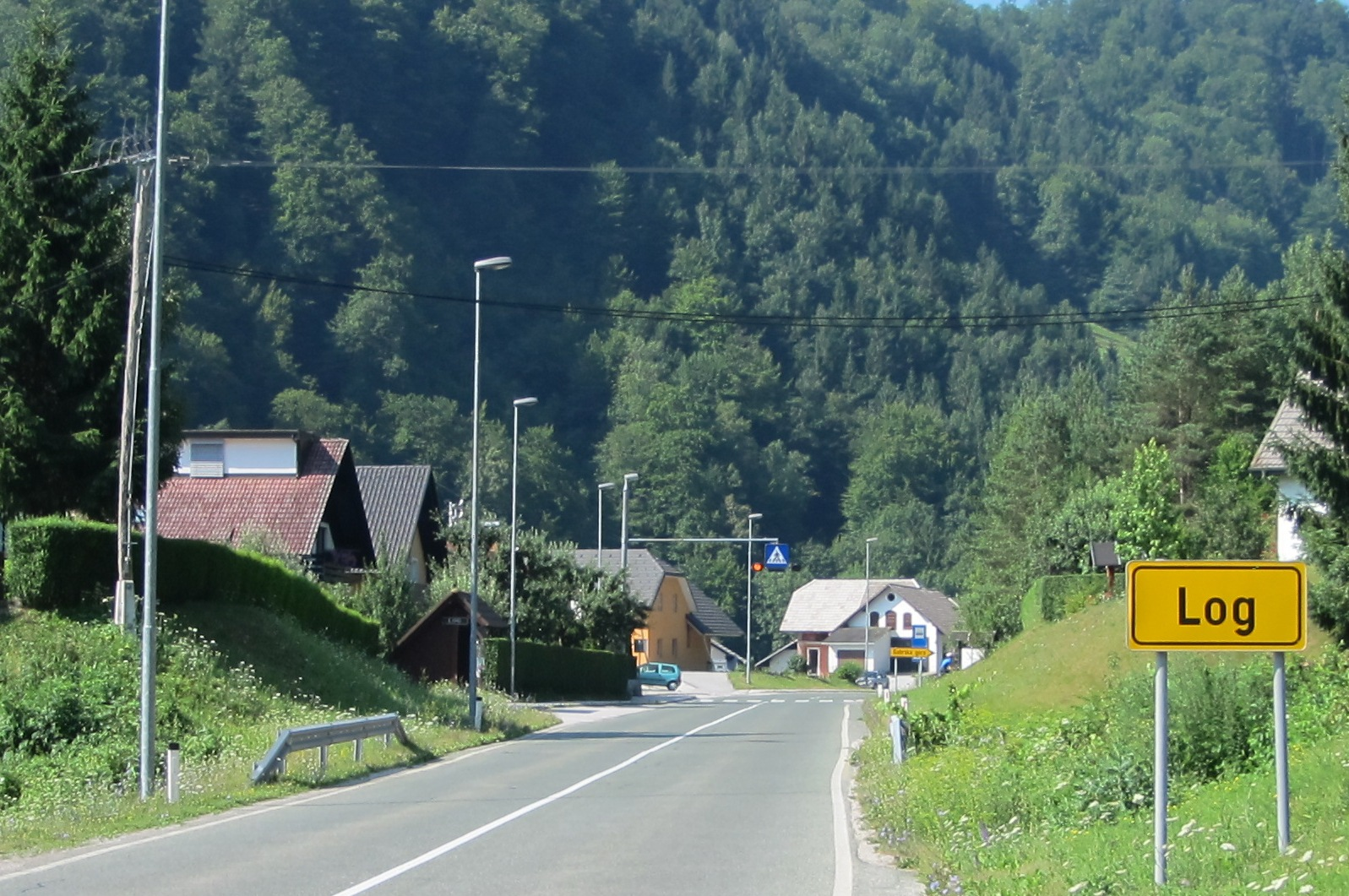

- Location in Slovenia
- Coordinates: 46°7′48.73″N 14°13′37.75″E
- Country: Slovenia
- Traditional region: Upper Carniola
- Statistical region: Upper Carniola
- Municipality: Škofja Loka

Area
  - Total: 2.54 km^{2} (0.98 sq mi)
- Elevation: 385.8 m (1,266 ft)

Population (2002)
  - Total: 179

Log nad Škofjo Loko (pronounced [ˈloːk nat ˈʃkoːfjɔ ˈloːkɔ]) is a village on the right bank of the Poljanščica River in the Municipality of Škofja Loka in the Upper Carniola region of Slovenia.

== Name ==
The name of the settlement was changed from Log to Log nad Škofjo Loko in 1955.
