= Svetega Petra Hrib =

Svetega Petra Hrib Hrib pri Zmincu (1955–1994)
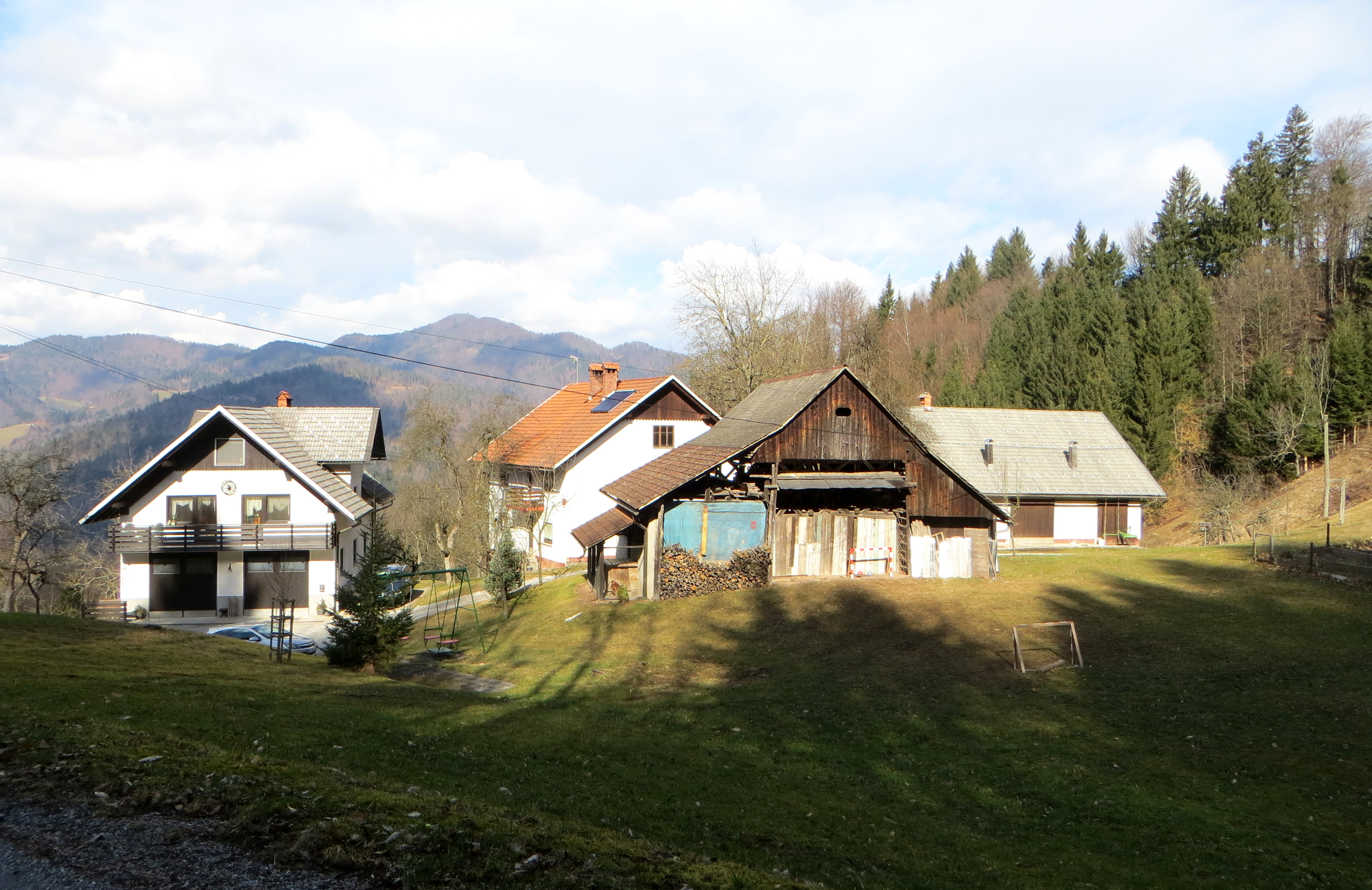

- Location in Slovenia
- Coordinates: 46°7′59.08″N 14°16′55.62″E
- Country: Slovenia
- Traditional region: Upper Carniola
- Statistical region: Upper Carniola
- Municipality: Škofja Loka

Area
  - Total: 1.63 km^{2} (0.63 sq mi)
- Elevation: 655.5 m (2,151 ft)

Population (2002)
  - Total: 32

Svetega Petra Hrib (pronounced [ˈsʋeːtɛɡa ˈpeːtɾa ˈxɾːip]; in older sources also Sveti Peter, German: Sankt Peter im Gebirge) is a small settlement in the Municipality of Škofja Loka in the Upper Carniola region of Slovenia.

== Name ==
The name Svetega Petra Hrib means 'Saint Peter's Hill', referring to the location of the village on a hill that rises above Saint Peter's Church in Bodovlje. The name of the settlement was changed from Svetega Petra Hrib (literally, 'Saint Peter's hill') to Hrib pri Zmincu (literally, 'hill near Zminec') in 1955. The name was changed on the basis of the 1948 Law on Names of Settlements and Designations of Squares, Streets, and Buildings as part of efforts by Slovenia's postwar communist government to remove religious elements from toponyms. The name Svetega Petra Hrib was restored in 1994. In the past the German name was Sankt Peter im Gebirge.

== Cultural heritage ==
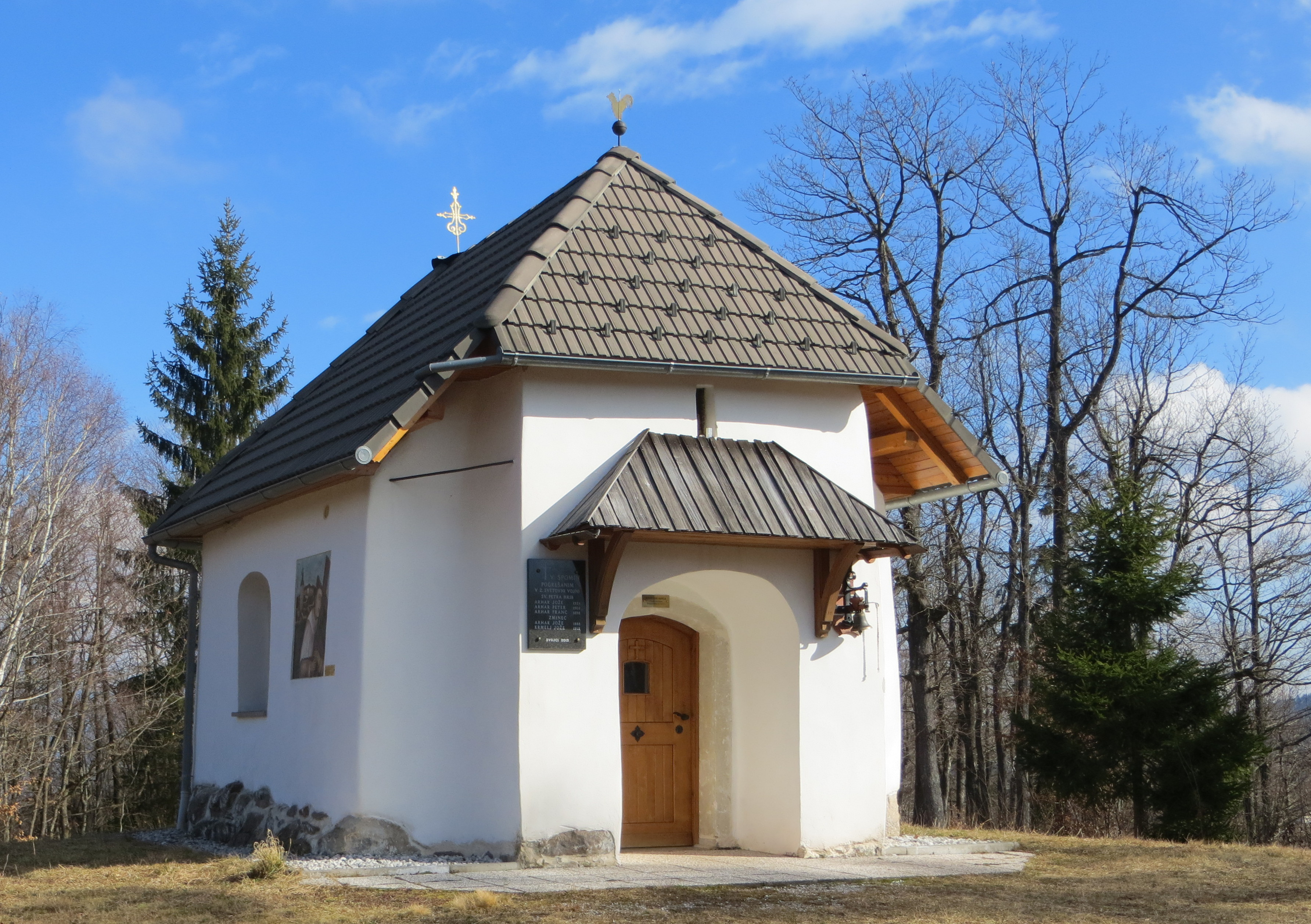
Arhar Chapel

- The Babnik Granary (Babnikova kašča) stands at the Babnik farm in the southern part of the settlement, near Bodovlje Creek (Bodoljska grapa). It has a stone foundation and a wooden upper story with a balcony.
- The Arhar Chapel (Arharjeva kapela) stands above the Arhar farm in the northern part of the settlement. It dates from the mid-19th century and is said to have been built in thanksgiving after a wolf was driven away from the Arhar farm. The altar in the chapel is dedicated to Saint Bernard, and his image on the altar is flanked by statues of Saint Peter to the left and Saint Paul to the right. The chapel was renovated in 1935 and again in 2015.
