= Municipality of Škofja Loka =

Municipality of Slovenia

Municipality of Škofja Loka Občina Škofja Loka
- Municipality
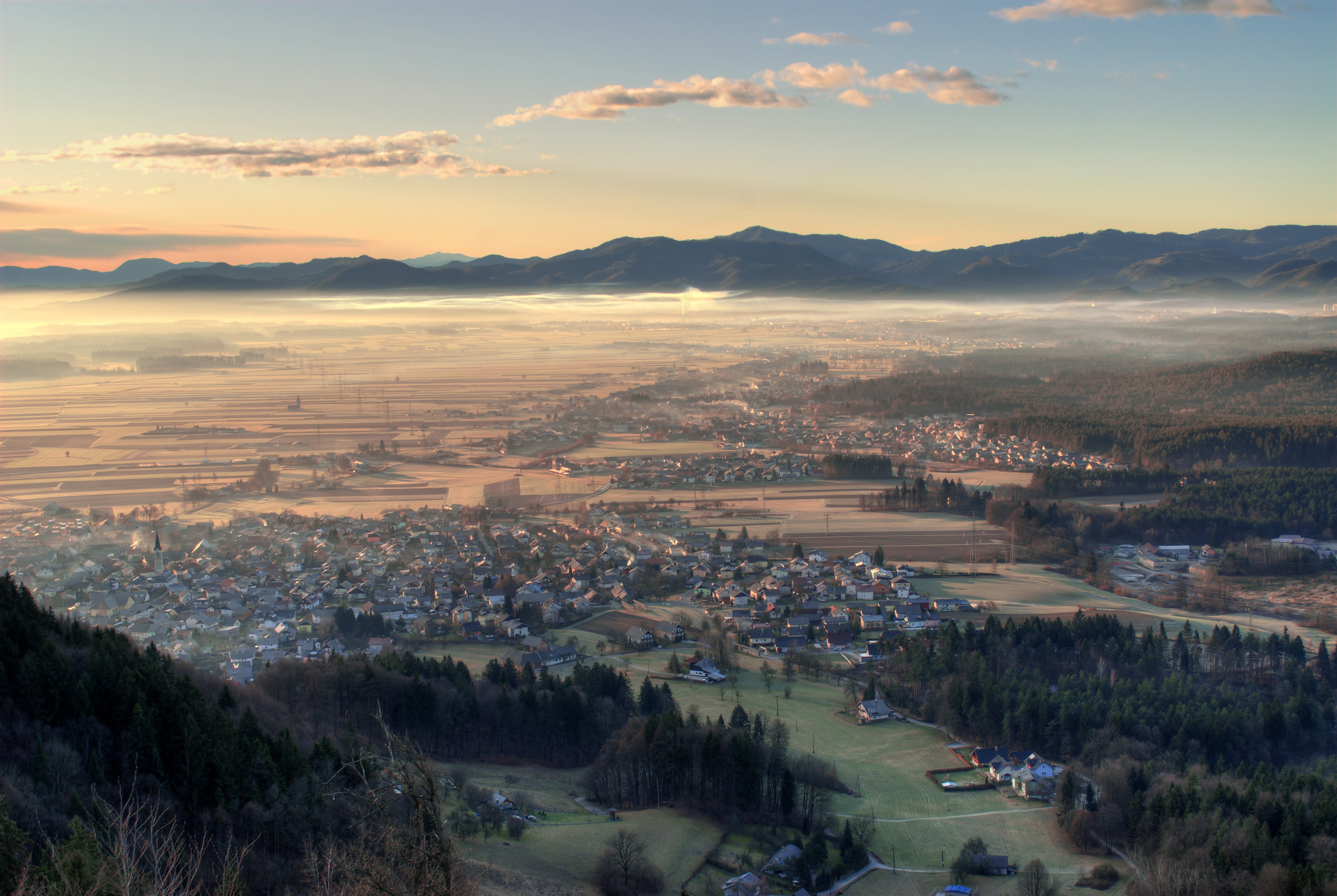

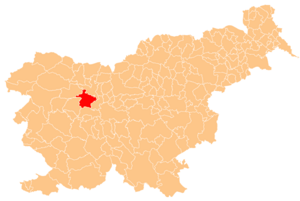
- Location of the Municipality of Škofja Loka in Slovenia
- Coordinates: 46°10′N 14°18′E
- Country: Slovenia

Government
  - Mayor: Tine Radinja

Area
  - Total: 145 km^{2} (56 sq mi)

Population (2010)
  - Total: 22,668
  - Density: 156/km^{2} (405/sq mi)
- Time zone: UTC+01 (CET)
  - Summer (DST): UTC+02 (CEST)
- Source: Statistical Office of the Republic of Slovenia, census of 2010.

The Municipality of Škofja Loka (pronounced [ˈʃkoːfja ˈloːka]; Slovene: Občina Škofja Loka) is a municipality in the Upper Carniola region of Slovenia. The seat of the municipality is the town of Škofja Loka. The municipality was established in its current form on 3 October 1994, when the former larger Municipality of Škofja Loka was subdivided into the municipalities of Gorenja Vas–Poljane, Škofja Loka, Železniki, and Žiri.

== Settlements ==
In addition to the municipal seat of Škofja Loka, the municipality also includes the following settlements:

- Binkelj
- Bodovlje
- Breznica pod Lubnikom
- Brode
- Bukov Vrh nad Visokim
- Bukovica
- Bukovščica
- Crngrob
- Dorfarje
- Draga
- Forme
- Gabrk
- Gabrovo
- Gabrška Gora
- Godešič
- Gorenja Vas–Reteče
- Gosteče
- Grenc
- Hosta
- Knape
- Kovski Vrh
- Križna Gora
- Lipica
- Log nad Škofjo Loko
- Moškrin
- Na Logu
- Papirnica
- Pevno
- Podpulfrca
- Pozirno
- Praprotno
- Pungert
- Puštal
- Reteče
- Rovte v Selški Dolini
- Ševlje
- Sopotnica
- Spodnja Luša
- Staniše
- Stara Loka
- Stirpnik
- Strmica
- Suha
- Svetega Petra Hrib
- Sveti Andrej
- Sveta Barbara
- Sveti Duh
- Sveti Florijan nad Škofjo Loko
- Sveti Lenart
- Sveti Ožbolt
- Sveti Tomaž
- Trata
- Trnje
- Valterski Vrh
- Vešter
- Vincarje
- Virlog
- Virmaše
- Visoko pri Poljanah
- Zgornja Luša
- Zminec
