= Hosta, Škofja Loka =

Hosta
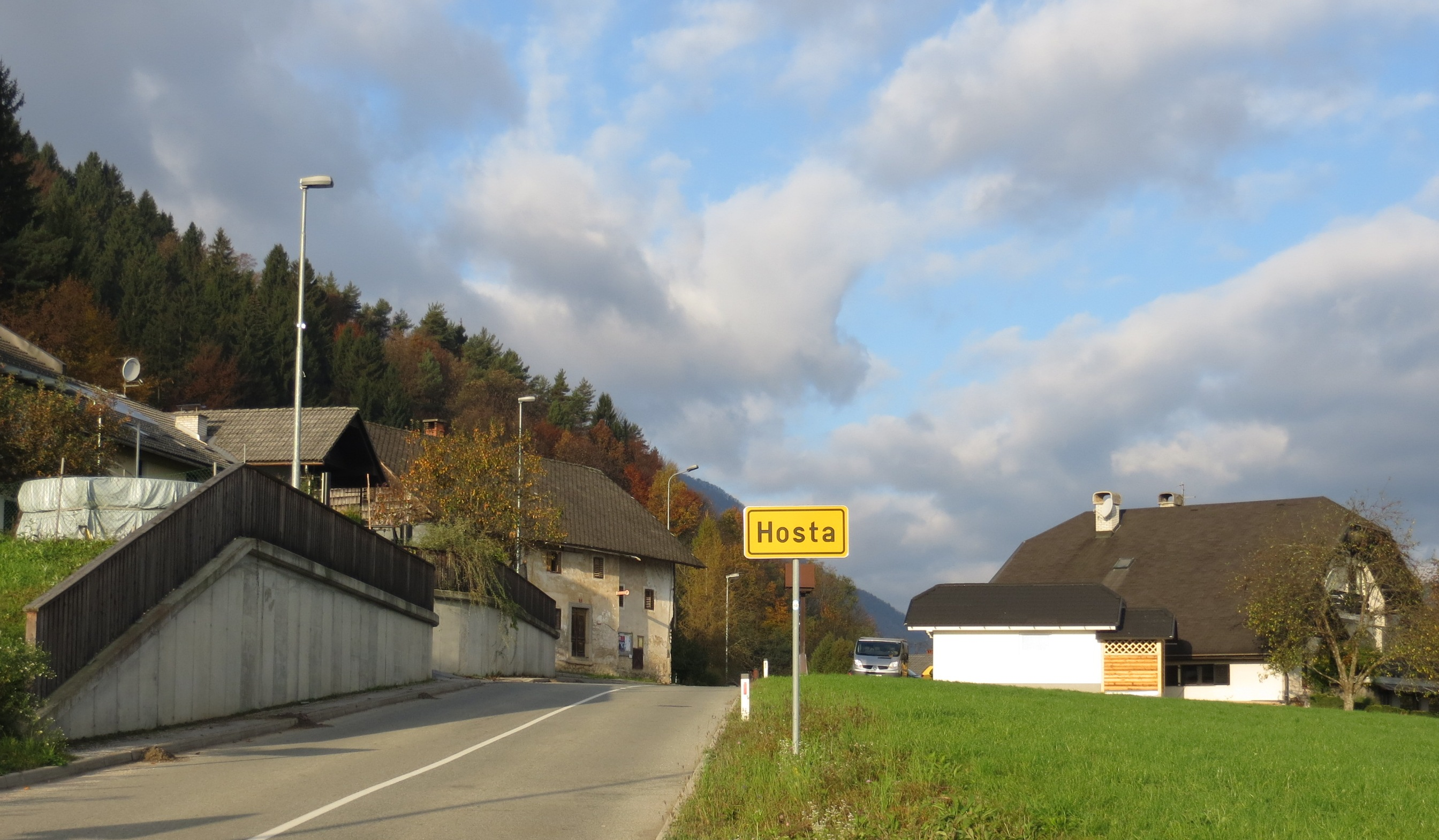

- Location in Slovenia
- Coordinates: 46°9′39.54″N 14°19′43.06″E
- Country: Slovenia
- Traditional region: Upper Carniola
- Statistical region: Upper Carniola
- Municipality: Škofja Loka

Area
  - Total: 1.09 km^{2} (0.42 sq mi)
- Elevation: 347 m (1,138 ft)

Population (2002)
  - Total: 80

Hosta (pronounced [ˈxoːsta]) is a settlement on the right bank of the Sora River in the Municipality of Škofja Loka in the Upper Carniola region of Slovenia.

== Name ==
The name Hosta comes from the dialect word hosta 'woods, forest'. This name and variants of it (Host, Hostec, etc.) are common in Slovenia, referring to various toponyms and microtoponyms.
