= Knape =

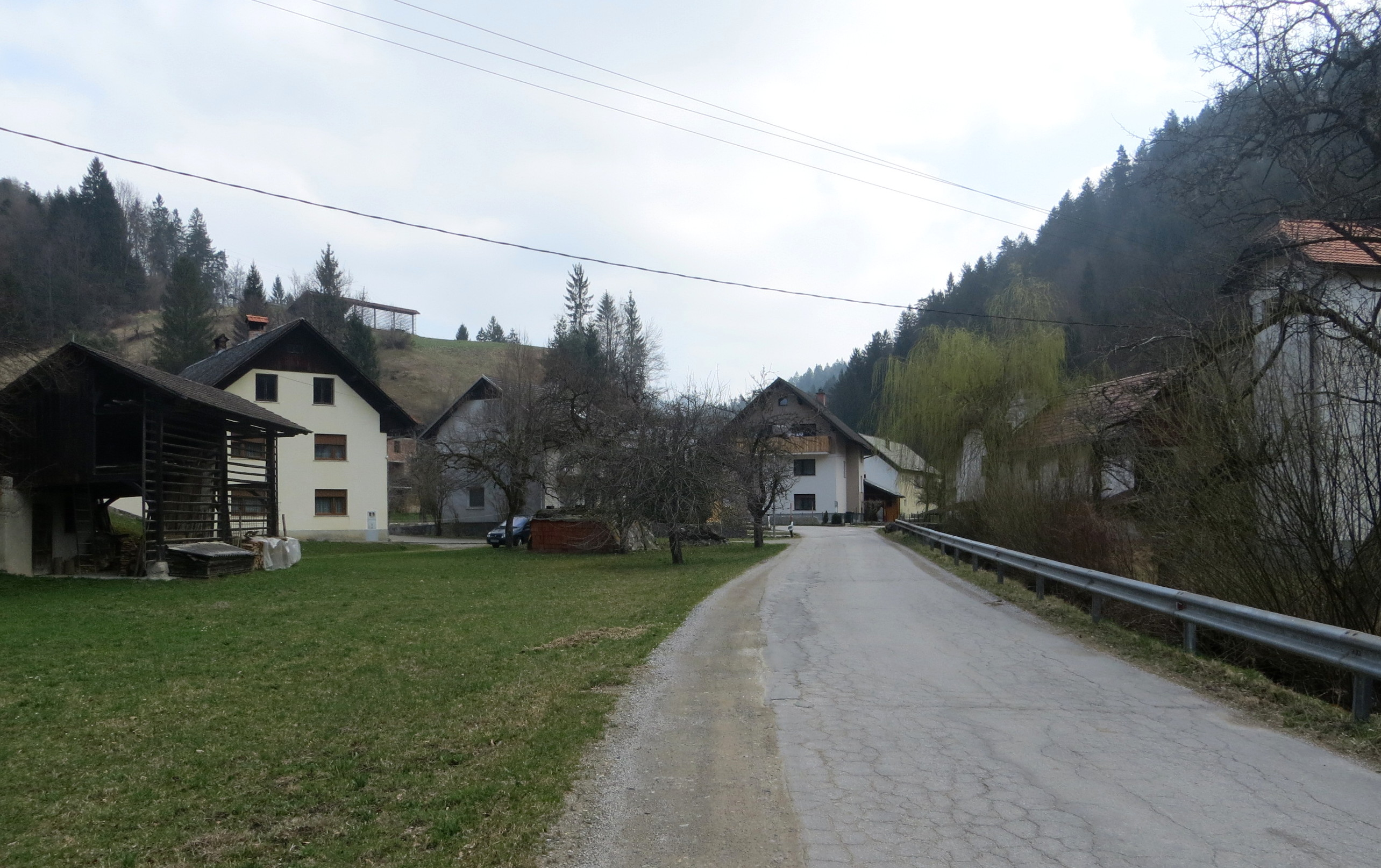

- Location in Slovenia
- Coordinates: 46°13′7.76″N 14°15′12.68″E
- Country: Slovenia
- Traditional region: Upper Carniola
- Statistical region: Upper Carniola
- Municipality: Škofja Loka

Area
  - Total: 1.59 km^{2} (0.61 sq mi)
- Elevation: 429.4 m (1,409 ft)

Population (2002)
  - Total: 84

Knape (pronounced [ˈknaːpɛ], German: Knapou) is a small settlement in the Municipality of Škofja Loka in the Upper Carniola region of Slovenia.

== Name ==
The name Knape is derived from the Slovene noun knap 'miner', a borrowing from Old High German knappe 'boy, squire, servant'. Iron ore was formerly mined in the Jablenovica Valley east of the village.
