= Binkelj =

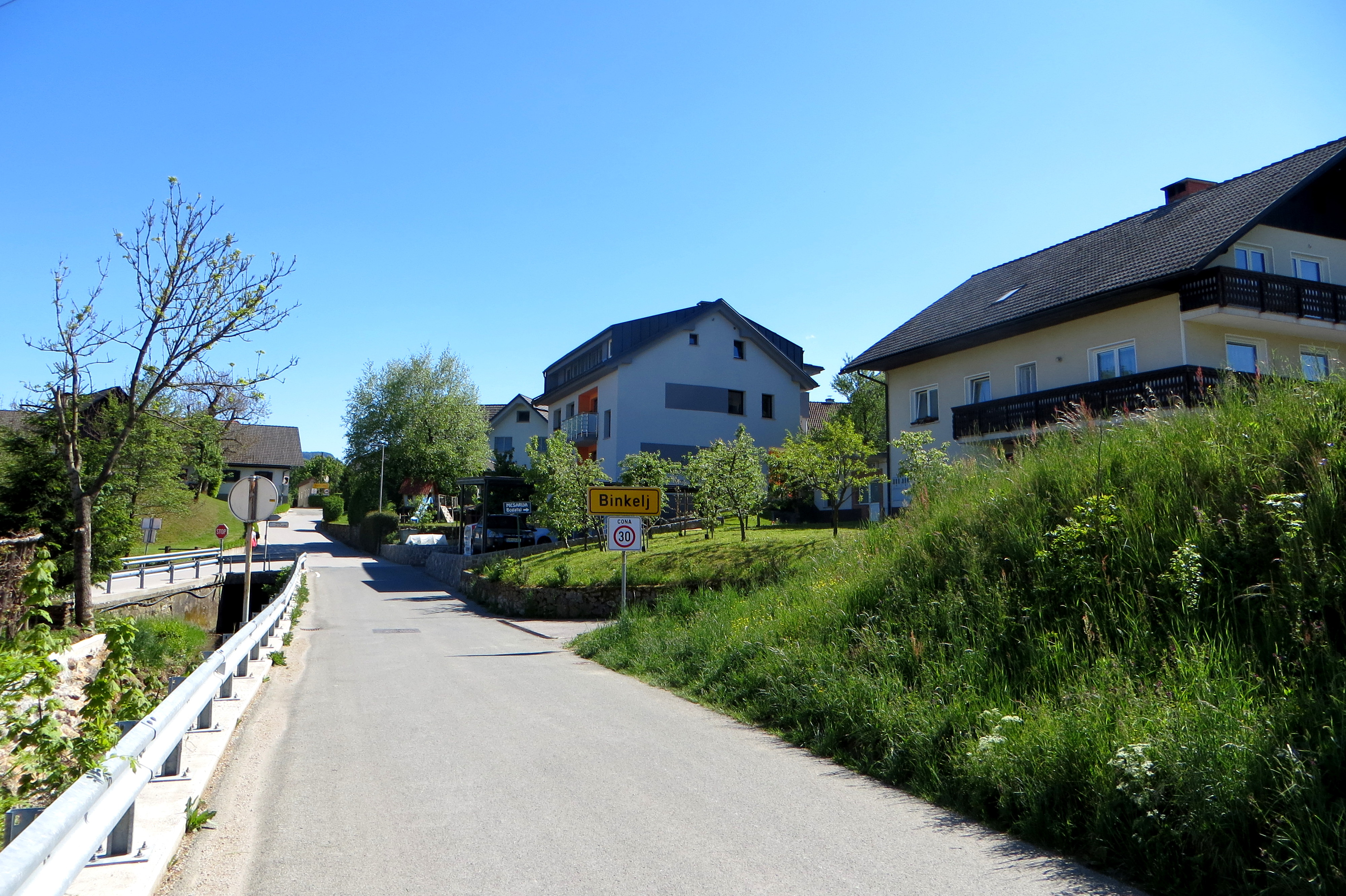

- Location in Slovenia
- Coordinates: 46°10′28.73″N 14°17′48.23″E
- Country: Slovenia
- Traditional region: Upper Carniola
- Statistical region: Upper Carniola
- Municipality: Škofja Loka

Area
  - Total: 0.06 km^{2} (0.023 sq mi)
- Elevation: 368.5 m (1,209 ft)

Population (2002)
  - Total: 164

Binkelj (pronounced [ˈbiːŋkəl]; German: Winkel) is a settlement in the Municipality of Škofja Loka in the Upper Carniola region of Slovenia. Urban expansion has made it an actual continuous part of the town of Škofja Loka.

== Name ==
Binkelj was attested in written sources in 1300 as in dem Winchel (and as ze Alten Lak zu Winkhel in 1392, am Puhel before 1492, and im Winkhel in 1500). The name is derived from Middle High German winkel 'corner, secluded area, hiding place'. In the past the German name was Winkel.
