= Na Logu =

Na Logu Log (until 1951)

- Location in Slovenia
- Coordinates: 46°8′9.09″N 14°12′43.88″E
- Country: Slovenia
- Traditional region: Upper Carniola
- Statistical region: Upper Carniola
- Municipality: Škofja Loka

Area
  - Total: 1.74 km^{2} (0.67 sq mi)
- Elevation: 619.5 m (2,032 ft)

Population (2002)
  - Total: 130

Na Logu (pronounced [na ˈloːɡu]) is a settlement in the Municipality of Škofja Loka in the Upper Carniola region of Slovenia.

== Name ==
The name of the settlement was changed from Log to Na Logu in 1951.

== Church ==
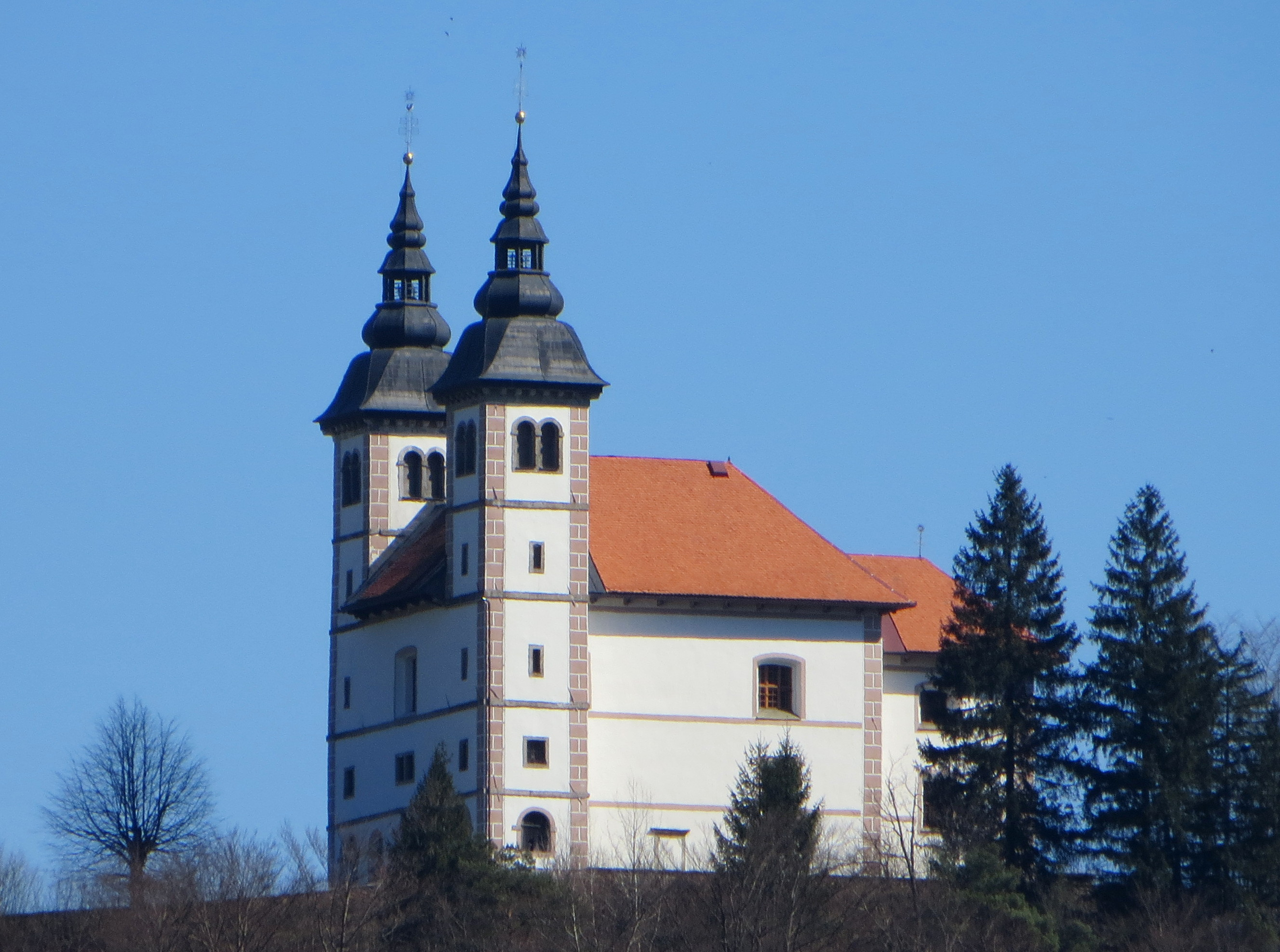
St. Wolfgang's Church in Na Logu

The local church is dedicated to Saint Wolfgang and was built in the 1670s.
