= Draga, Škofja Loka =

Draga
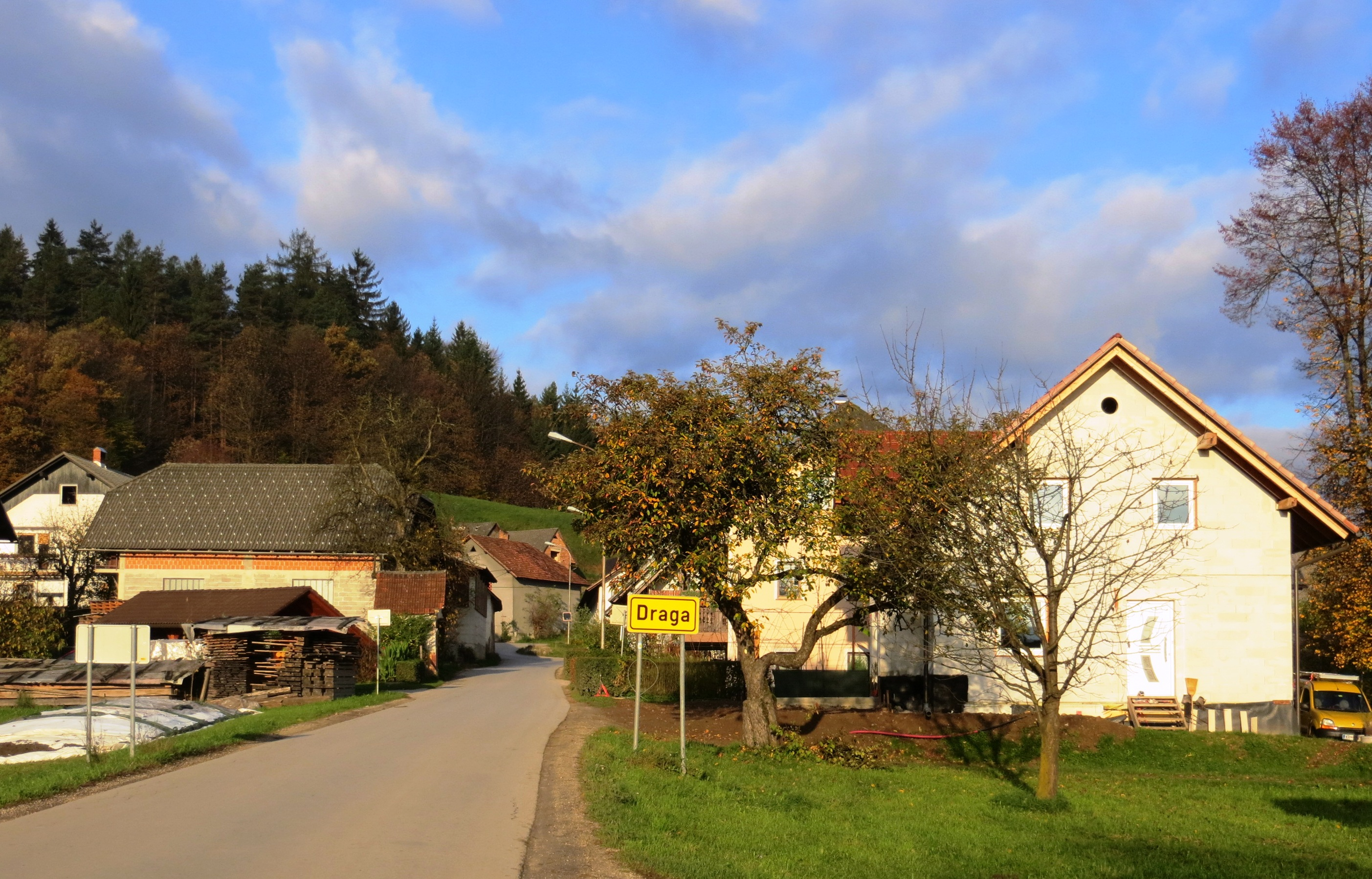

- Location in Slovenia
- Coordinates: 46°8′50.55″N 14°21′21.98″E
- Country: Slovenia
- Traditional region: Upper Carniola
- Statistical region: Upper Carniola
- Municipality: Škofja Loka

Area
  - Total: 2.13 km^{2} (0.82 sq mi)
- Elevation: 348.4 m (1,143 ft)

Population (2002)
  - Total: 118

Draga (pronounced [ˈdɾaːɡa]) is a small village in the Municipality of Škofja Loka in the Upper Carniola region of Slovenia.

== Name ==
Draga was attested in written sources in 1252 as Drag (and as Trag in 1439 and Draga in 1444). The name Draga is derived from the Slovene common noun draga 'small, narrow valley', referring to the geographical location of the settlement.
