= Sveti Lenart, Škofja Loka =

Sveti Lenart Lenart nad Lušo (1955–2003)
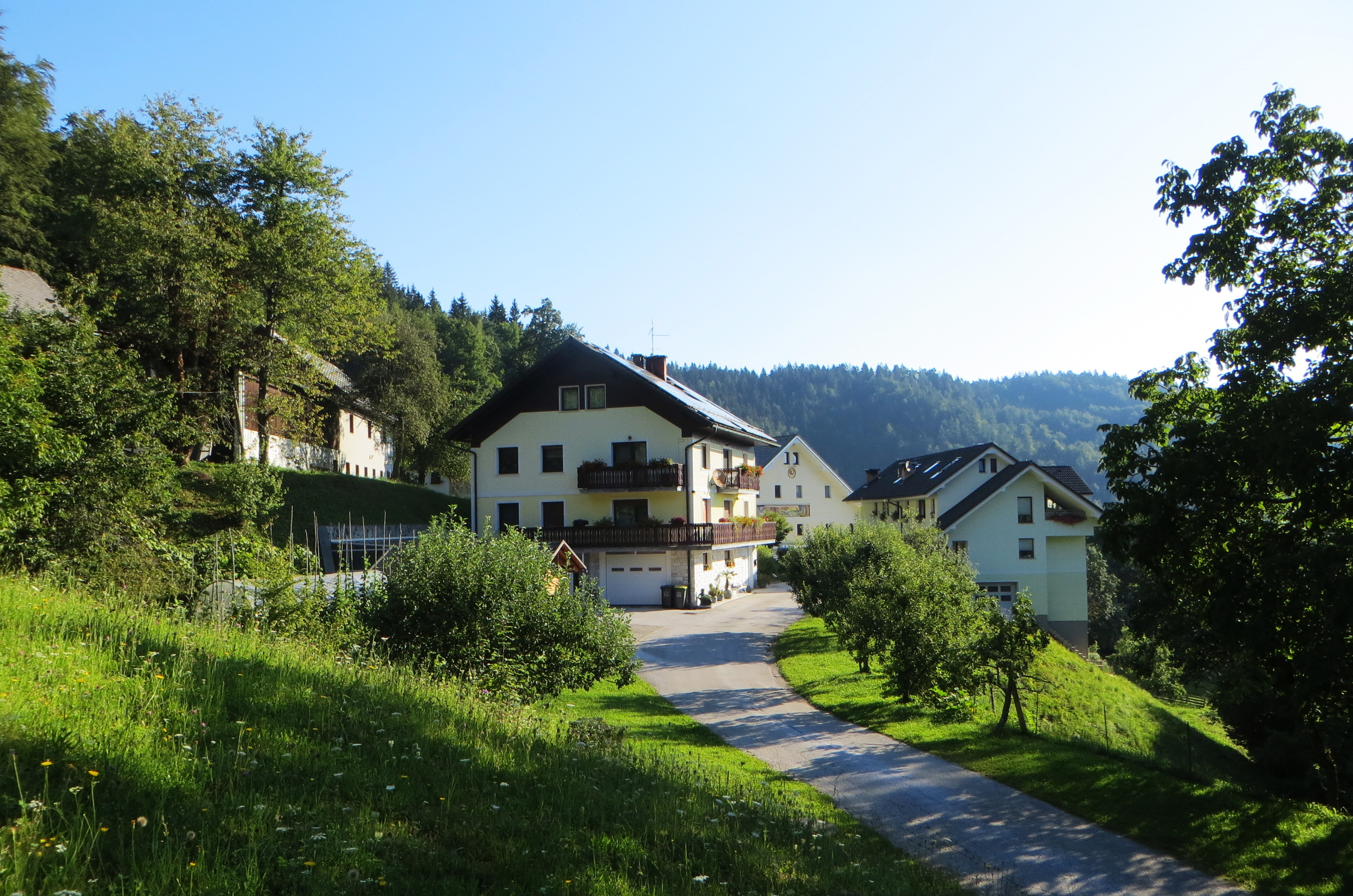

- Location in Slovenia
- Coordinates: 46°11′42.88″N 14°11′13.15″E
- Country: Slovenia
- Traditional region: Upper Carniola
- Statistical region: Upper Carniola
- Municipality: Škofja Loka

Area
  - Total: 4.17 km^{2} (1.61 sq mi)
- Elevation: 744.4 m (2,442 ft)

Population (2002)
  - Total: 90

Sveti Lenart (pronounced [ˈsʋeːti ˈleːnaɾt]; German: Sankt Leonhard) is a village in the Municipality of Škofja Loka in the Upper Carniola region of Slovenia.

== Name ==
The name of the settlement was changed from Sveti Lenart (literally, 'Saint Leonard') to Lenart nad Lušo (literally, 'Leonard above Luša') in 1955. The name was changed on the basis of the 1948 Law on Names of Settlements and Designations of Squares, Streets, and Buildings as part of efforts by Slovenia's postwar communist government to remove religious elements from toponyms. In the past the German name was Sankt Leonhard. The name Sveti Lenart was restored in a two-step process: in 1998 the hamlet of Sveti Lenart was separated from neighboring Golica and made an independent settlement, and then in 2003 the adjacent settlement of Lenart nad Lušo was annexed by Sveti Lenart.

== Church ==
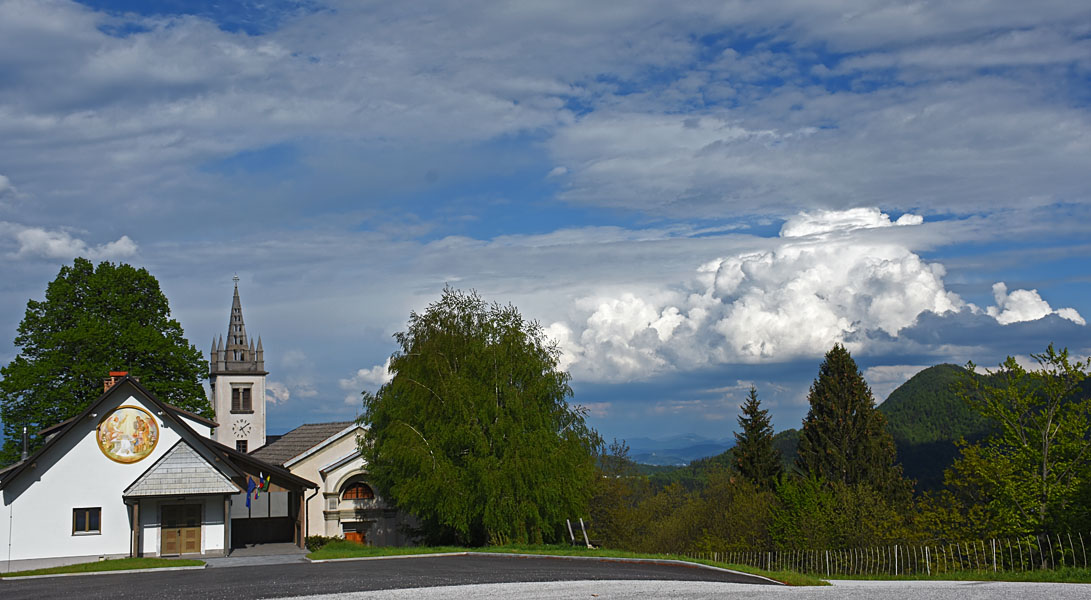
Saint Leonard's Church

The local church is dedicated to Saint Leonard. The original church was Gothic, but was rebuilt after a fire in 1852. The church was again demolished in the Second World War. The current building was designed by the architect Janez Valentinčič.
