= Grenc =

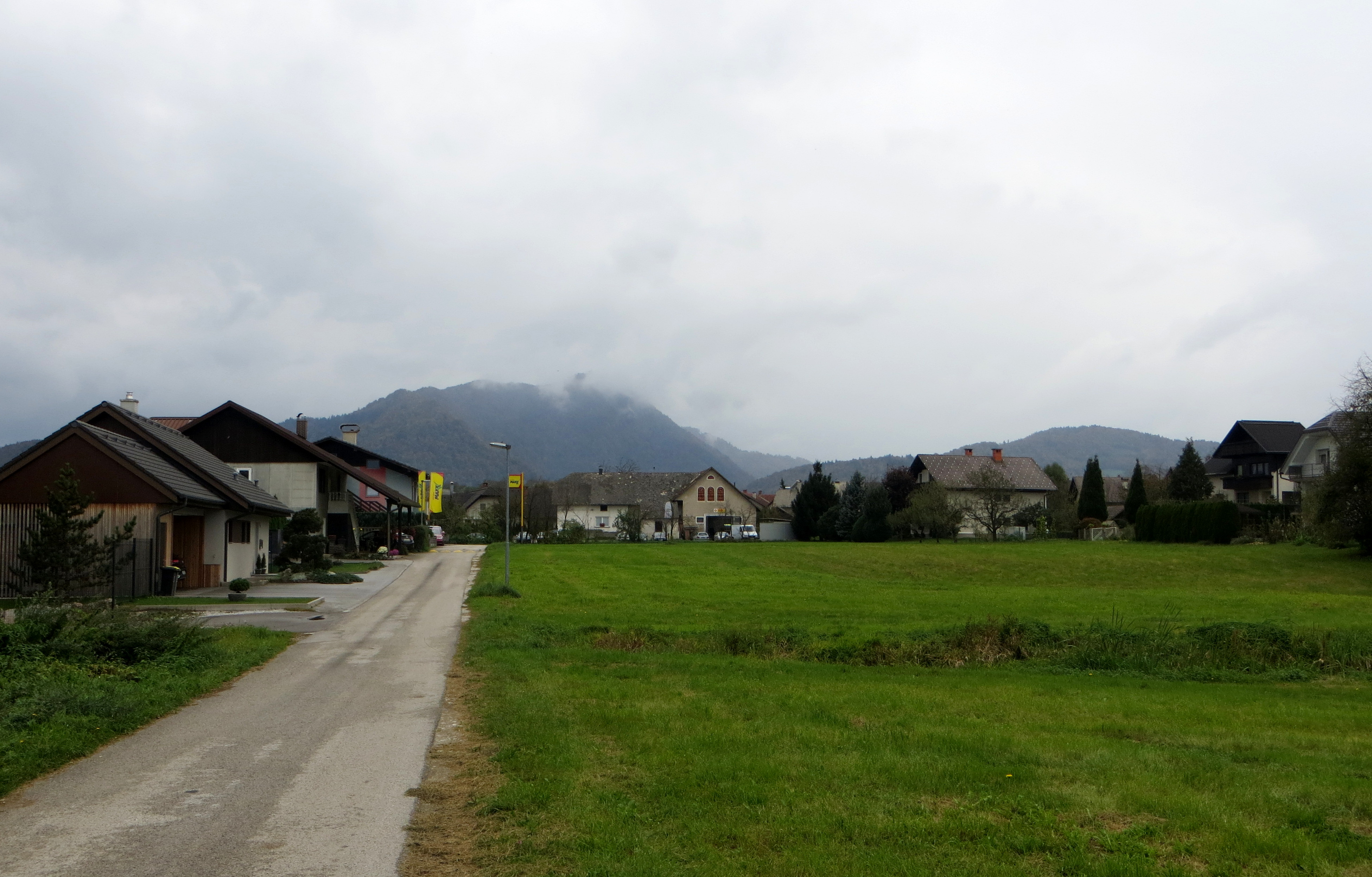

- Location in Slovenia
- Coordinates: 46°10′31.22″N 14°19′18.65″E
- Country: Slovenia
- Traditional region: Upper Carniola
- Statistical region: Upper Carniola
- Municipality: Škofja Loka

Area
  - Total: 0.59 km^{2} (0.23 sq mi)
- Elevation: 362.4 m (1,189 ft)

Population (2002)
  - Total: 181

Grenc (pronounced [ˈɡɾɛːnts]; in older sources also Grenec, German: Grenze) is a settlement in the Municipality of Škofja Loka in the Upper Carniola region of Slovenia.

Urbanization has meant that it has become part of the actual town of Škofja Loka.
