= Strmica, Škofja Loka =

Strmica
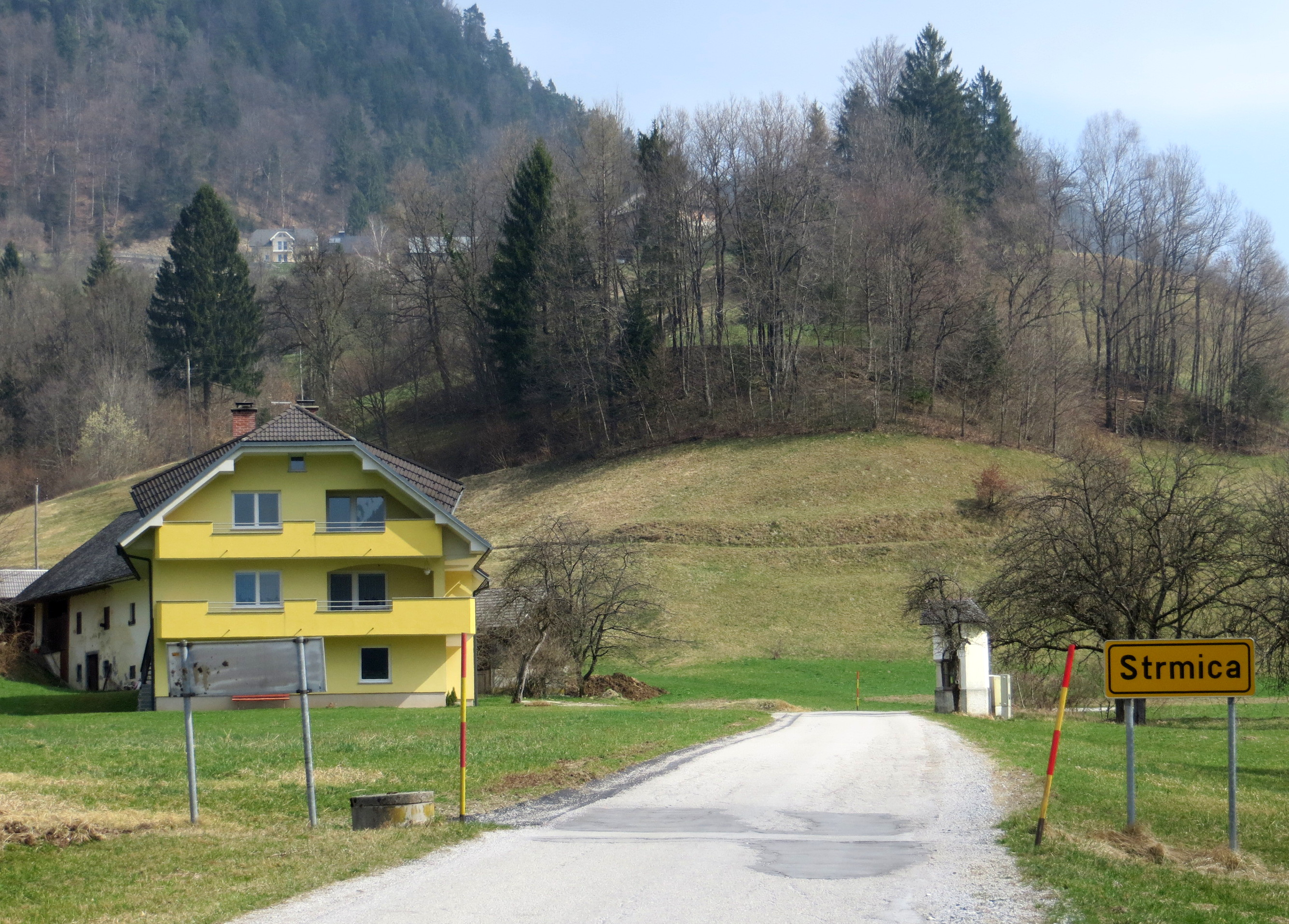

- Location in Slovenia
- Coordinates: 46°13′44.42″N 14°16′12.86″E
- Country: Slovenia
- Traditional region: Upper Carniola
- Statistical region: Upper Carniola
- Municipality: Škofja Loka

Area
  - Total: 1.82 km^{2} (0.70 sq mi)
- Elevation: 560.7 m (1,840 ft)

Population (2002)
  - Total: 64

Strmica (pronounced [ˈstəɾmitsa]) is a small settlement in the Municipality of Škofja Loka in the Upper Carniola region of Slovenia.
