= Sveta Barbara =

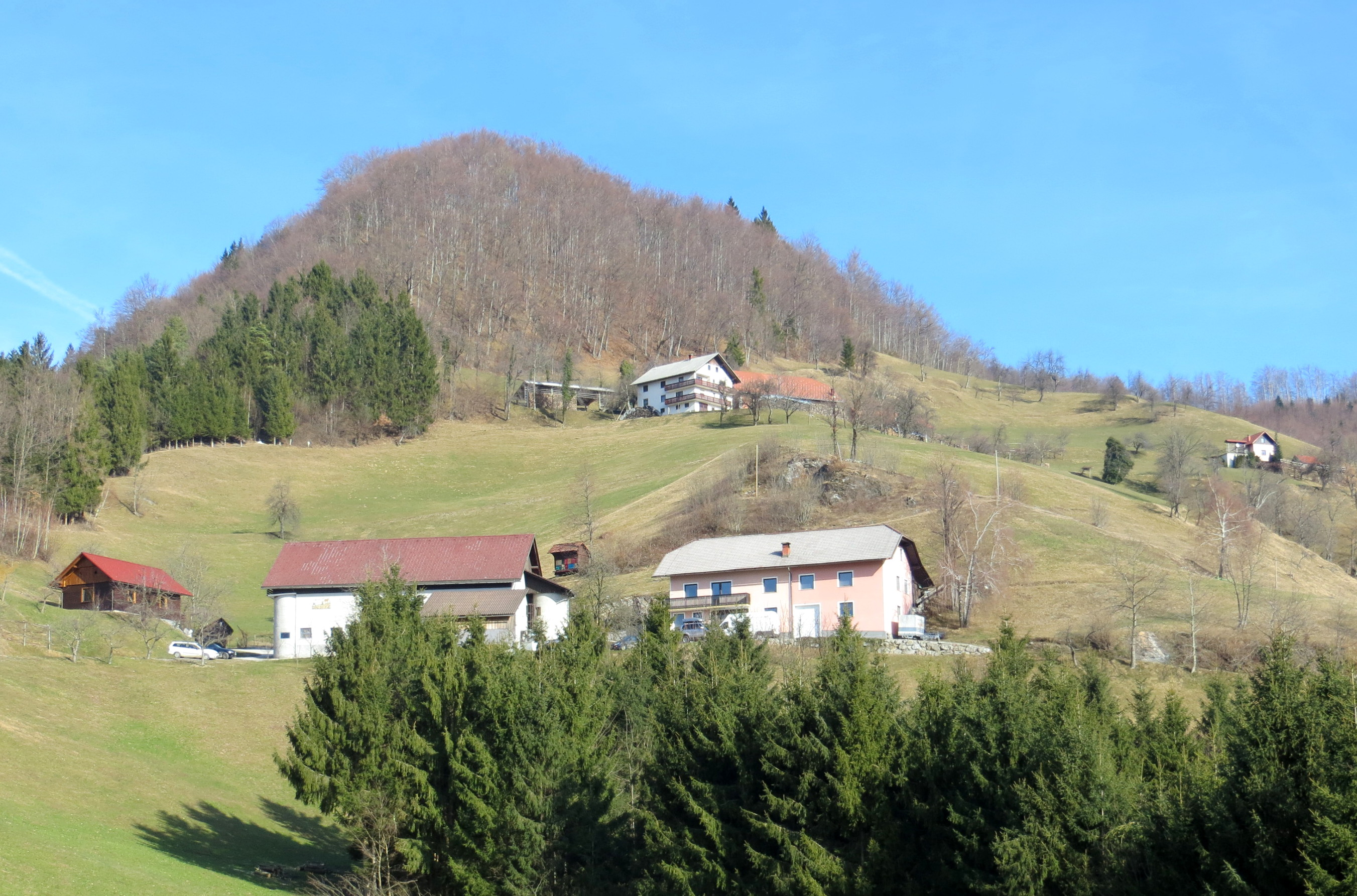

- Location in Slovenia
- Coordinates: 46°7′32.95″N 14°18′58.47″E
- Country: Slovenia
- Traditional region: Upper Carniola
- Statistical region: Upper Carniola
- Municipality: Škofja Loka

Area
  - Total: 8.24 km^{2} (3.18 sq mi)
- Elevation: 621.3 m (2,038 ft)

Population (2016)
  - Total: 159

Sveta Barbara (pronounced [ˈsʋeːta ˈbaːɾbaɾa]; German: Sankt Barbara) is a settlement in the Municipality of Škofja Loka in the Upper Carniola region of Slovenia.

== Church ==
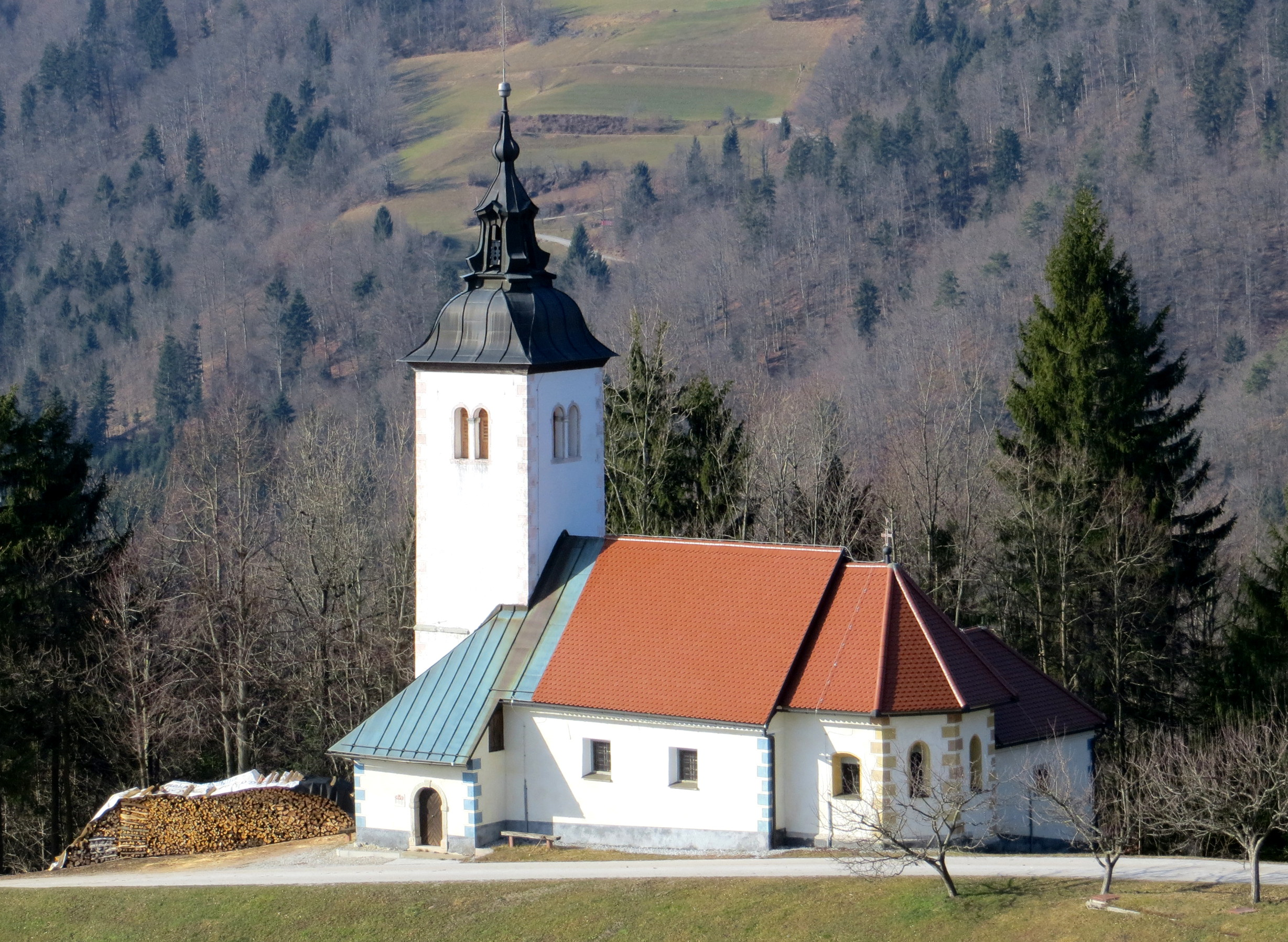
Saint Barbara's Church

The local church is dedicated to Saint Barbara and the settlement is named after it. It is Late Gothic, with the sanctuary dating to 1448. Poorly preserved mid- to late-15th century frescos on the south wall also indicate this date. The main altar dates to 1682 and the bell to 1692. The side altars and the pulpit are from the 18th century.
