= Reteče =

- Village
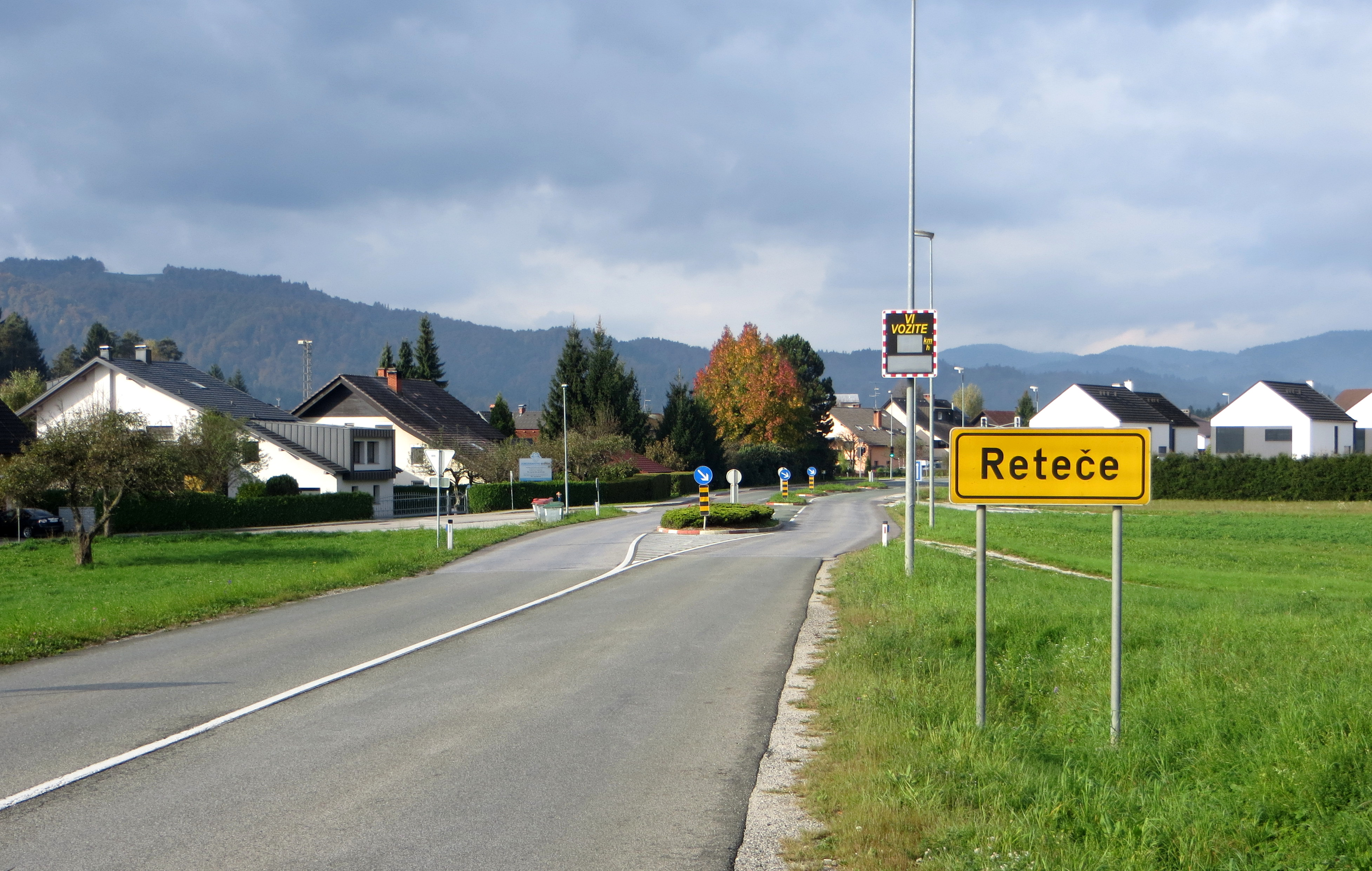

- Location in Slovenia
- Coordinates: 46°9′30.01″N 14°22′10″E
- Country: Slovenia
- Traditional region: Upper Carniola
- Statistical region: Upper Carniola
- Municipality: Škofja Loka

Area
  - Total: 1.43 km^{2} (0.55 sq mi)
- Elevation: 351.9 m (1,155 ft)

Population (2002)
  - Total: 368

Reteče (pronounced [ɾɛˈtɛːtʃɛ]; German: Retetsche) is a village in the Municipality of Škofja Loka in the Upper Carniola region of Slovenia.

== Church ==
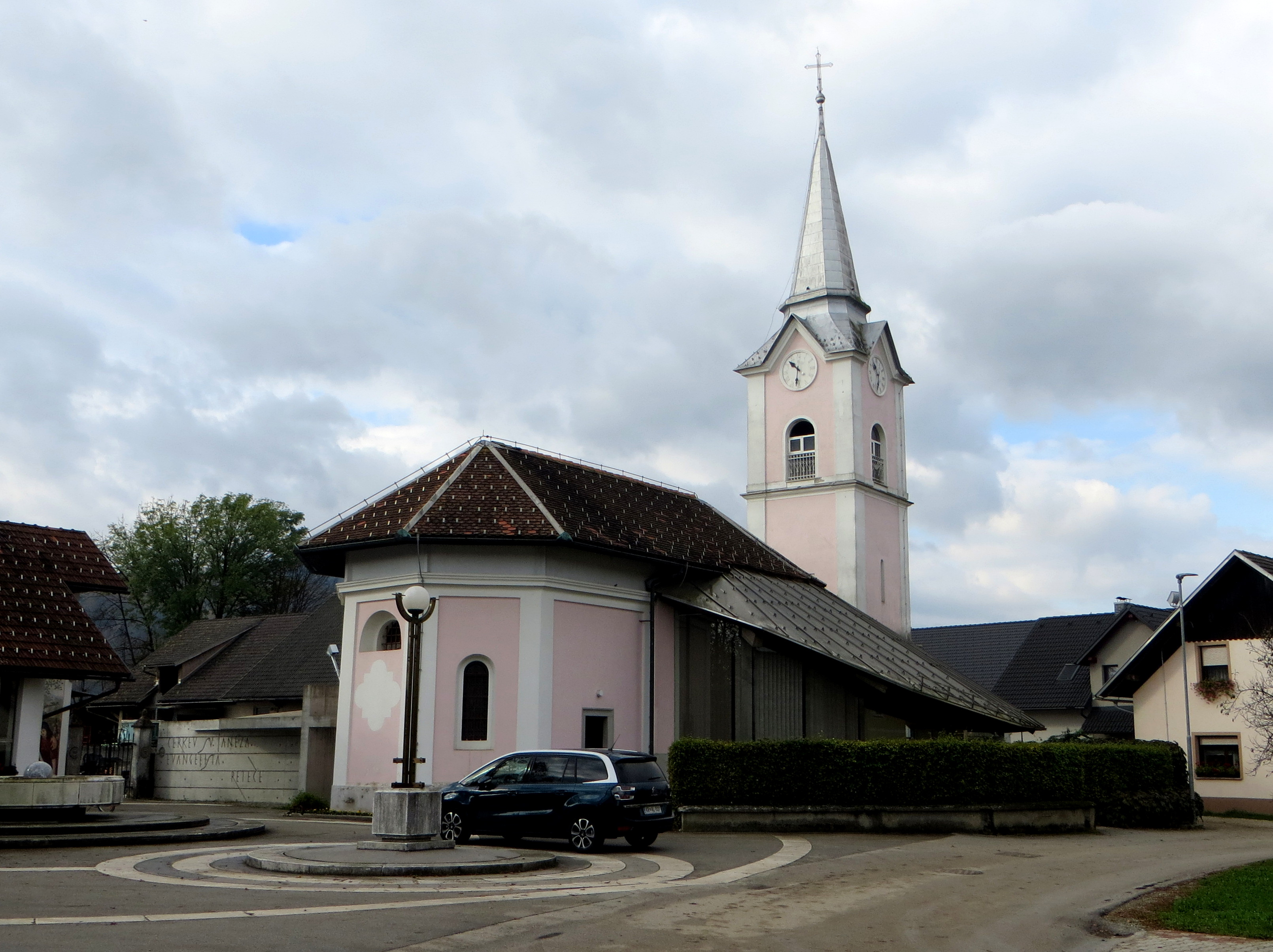
Saint John the Evangelist Church

The parish church in the settlement is dedicated to John the Evangelist. It was first mentioned in documents from 1501, but was rebuilt a number of times.
