= Dorfarje =

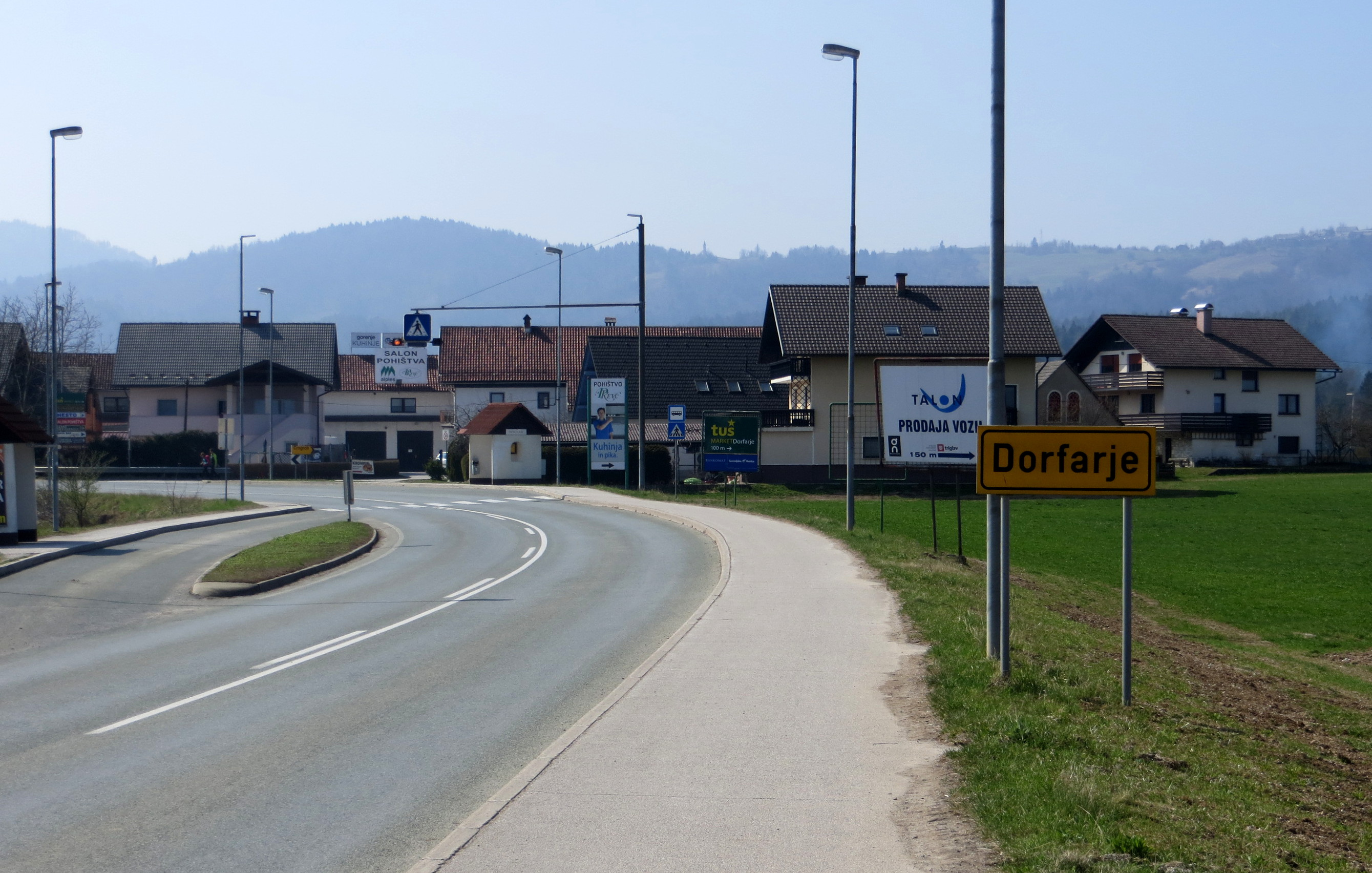

- Location in Slovenia
- Coordinates: 46°11′40.93″N 14°19′29.92″E
- Country: Slovenia
- Traditional region: Upper Carniola
- Statistical region: Upper Carniola
- Municipality: Škofja Loka

Area
  - Total: 0.71 km^{2} (0.27 sq mi)
- Elevation: 372.6 m (1,222 ft)

Population (2002)
  - Total: 203

Dorfarje (pronounced [ˈdoːɾfaɾjɛ]; German: Dörfern) is a village in the Municipality of Škofja Loka in the Upper Carniola region of Slovenia.

== Name ==
The name Dorfarje was first attested in 1291 as in Dorfern. It is derived from Middle High German Dorfern, originally a plural form of the common noun dorfære 'villager' (< dorf 'village'). The name therefore literally means 'villagers' and refers to early German colonization of the Sora Plain. In the past the German name was Dörfern.
