= Sankt Oswald =

Sankt Oswald may refer to the following places:

- Sankt Oswald-Riedlhütte, in Bavaria, Germany
- in Austria:
  - Sankt Oswald, Lower Austria, in Lower Austria
  - Sankt Oswald bei Freistadt, in Upper Austria
  - Sankt Oswald bei Haslach, in Upper Austria
  - Sankt Oswald bei Plankenwarth, in Styria
  - Sankt Oswald ob Eibiswald, in Styria
  - Sankt Oswald-Möderbrugg, in Styria
- in Slovenia:
  - Sveti Ožbolt, in Upper Carniola, known in the past as Sankt Oswald

== See also ==
- Saint Oswald
