= Jernej of Loka =

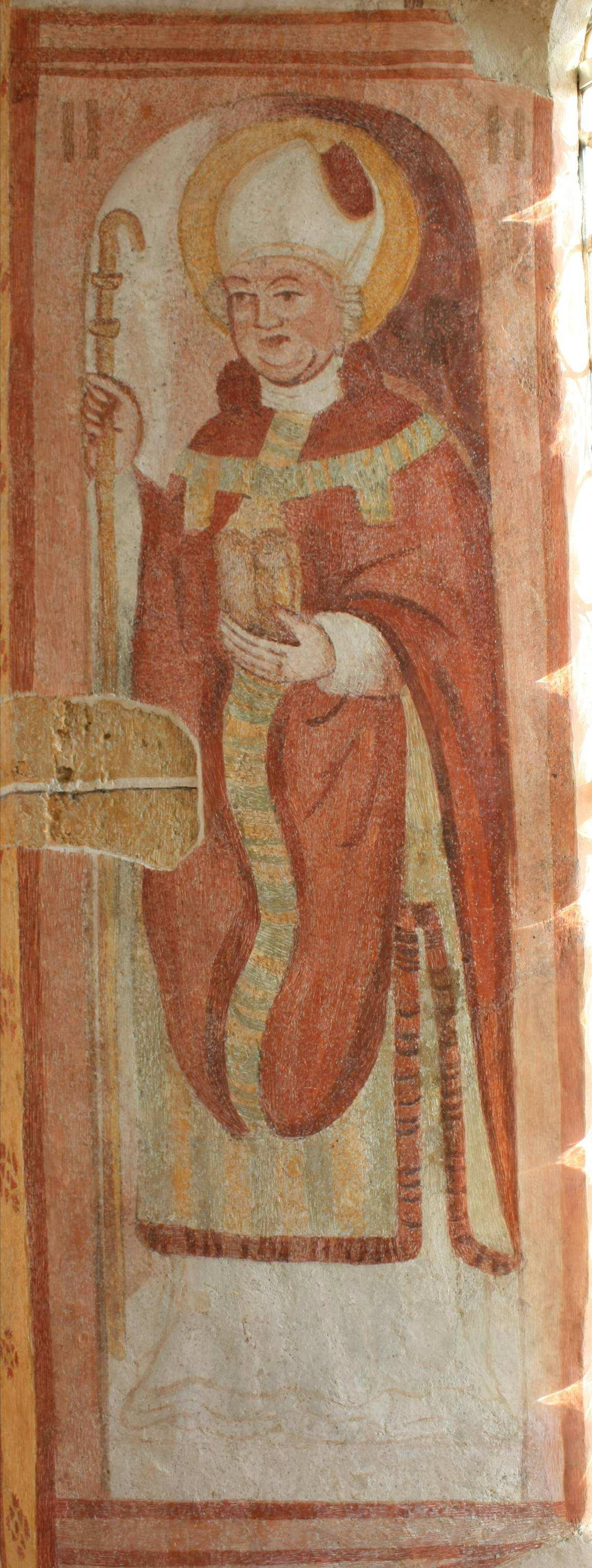
Fresco in St. Nicholas' Church, Godešič

Jernej of Loka (Bartholomew) was a 16th-century painter active in the Škofja Loka area, from which his epithet is also derived. He is known to have painted the frescoes in a number of other churches throughout the Upper Carniola region and some in the area of Tolmin (Slovenia) and in the Natisone Valley (Italy).

Churches where frescoes believed to have been painted by Jernej of Loka are preserved include:

- St. Mark's Church, Vrba, between 1525 and 1530
- St. John's Church, Suha
- St. Peter's Church, above Begunje, between 1530 and 1540
- St. John the Baptist Church, Lake Bohinj
- St. Peter's Church, Bodovlje, between 1525 and 1540
- St. Thomas' Church, Brode near Škofja Loka between 1530 and 1540
- St. Nicholas' Church, in Godešič, around 1530
- St. Lawrence's Church, above Zminec
- St. Andrew's Church, at Sveti Andrej above Zminc, between 1520 and 1530
- St. Oswald's Church, above Sveti Ožbolt, 1534
- Sts. Phillip and James Church, in Valterski Vrh, soon after 1534
- Holy Cross Church in Križna Gora
- St. Bricius' Church in Četena Ravan
- St. Jodocus' Church above Kranj, around 1530
- St. Clement's Church, in Bukovščica
- Birth of the Virgin Church in Police near Cerkno, 1536
- Virgin Mary Church in Polje near Bovec, 1520–1540
- Our Lady of the Snows Church above Avče near Kanal, around 1530
- St. John the Baptist Church in Spodnji Otok by Mošnje
- St. Mary Magdalene Church, in Brod near Bohinjska Bistrica, around 1534
- St. Bartholomew's Church in San Pietro in Natisone
- St. Lucy, Virgin and Martyr Church in San Leonardo in Natisone
