= Saint Oswald =

Saint Oswald may refer to:

== People ==
- Oswald of Northumbria (c.604–642), King of Northumbria, venerated in Anglican Communion and Roman Catholic Church
- Oswald of Worcester (died 992), Archbishop of York, venerated in Anglican Communion and Roman Catholic church

== Other ==
- St. Oswald (ward), a ward in Netherton, Merseyside, England
- Baron St Oswald, a noble title in the United Kingdom

== See also ==
- Sankt Oswald (disambiguation)
- Sveti Ožbolt
