= Brode, Škofja Loka =

Brode
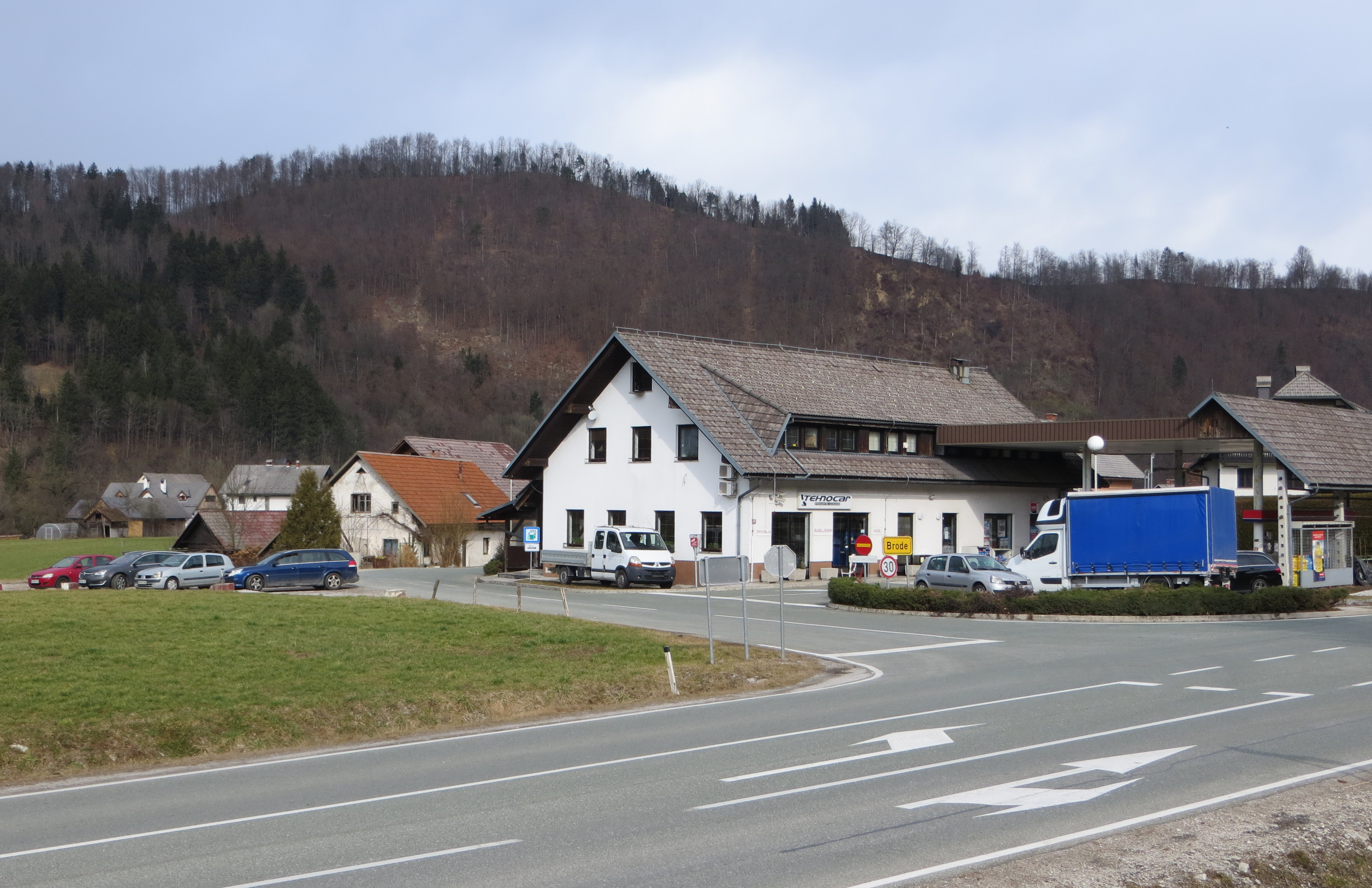

- Location in Slovenia
- Coordinates: 46°8′21.78″N 14°15′17.94″E
- Country: Slovenia
- Traditional region: Upper Carniola
- Statistical region: Upper Carniola
- Municipality: Škofja Loka

Area
  - Total: 1.84 km^{2} (0.71 sq mi)
- Elevation: 367.2 m (1,205 ft)

Population (2002)
  - Total: 148

Brode (pronounced [bɾɔˈdeː]; in older sources also Brodi, German: Wrodech) is a village in the Municipality of Škofja Loka in the Upper Carniola region of Slovenia.

== Name ==
Brode was attested in written sources in 1291 as Furten and in villa Fůrten (and again as Furten in 1318 and Furtten circa 1400). The name is originally a plural accusative of the Slovene common noun brod 'ford, shallow river crossing' and thus refers to a local geographical feature. In the past the German name was Wrodech.

== Church ==
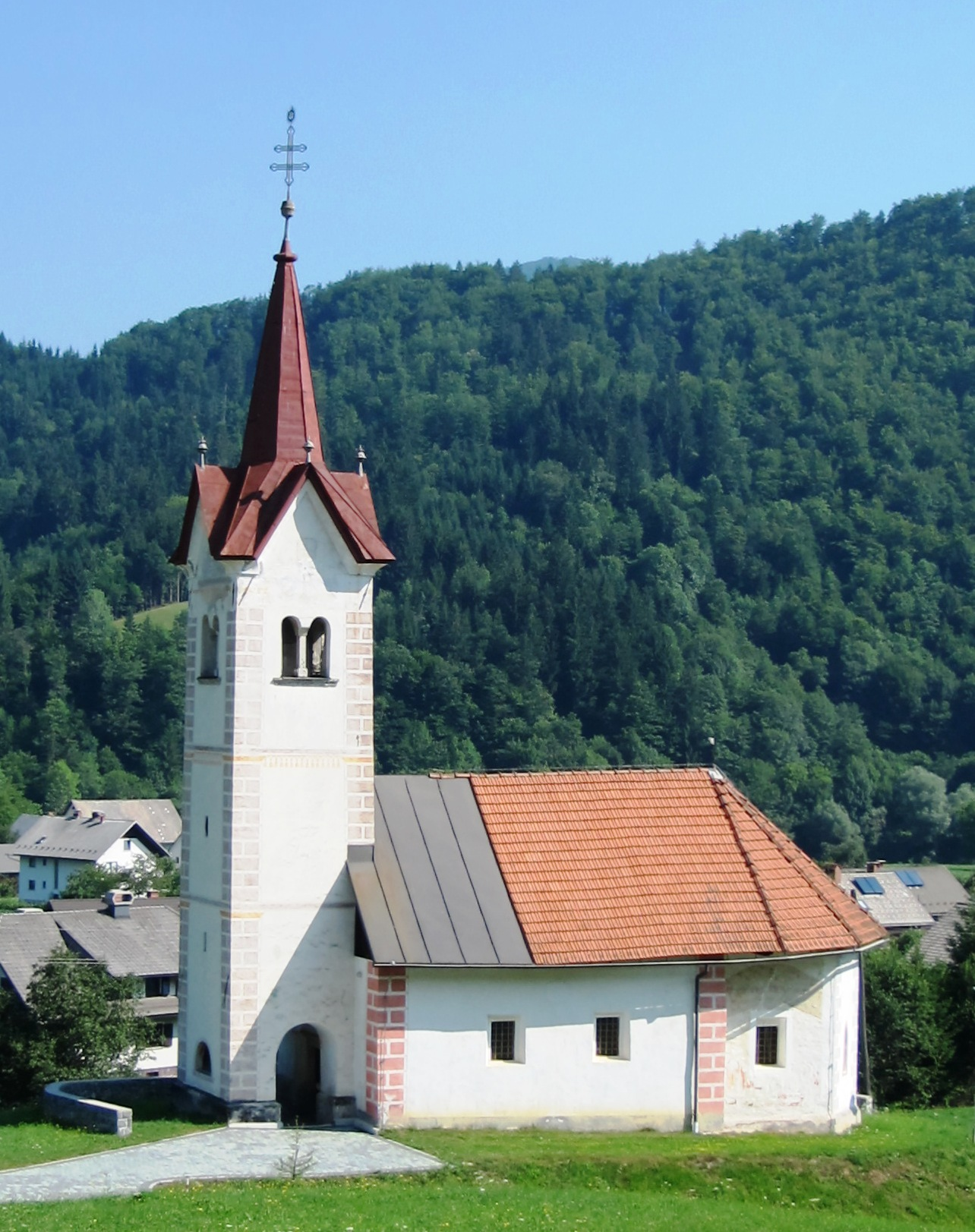
Saint Thomas' Church

The local church is dedicated to Saint Thomas. It is a late Gothic church and originally had a flat ceiling which was vaulted in the 18th century. Remains of frescos from the mid-16th century by the painter Jernej of Loka can be seen, depicting the Last Judgment, The Crucifixion, Saint George and the Dragon, and the Sacrifice of Isaac. The main altar dates to 1774.
