= Janez Kalan =

Slovene Roman Catholic priest

Janez Evangelist Kalan
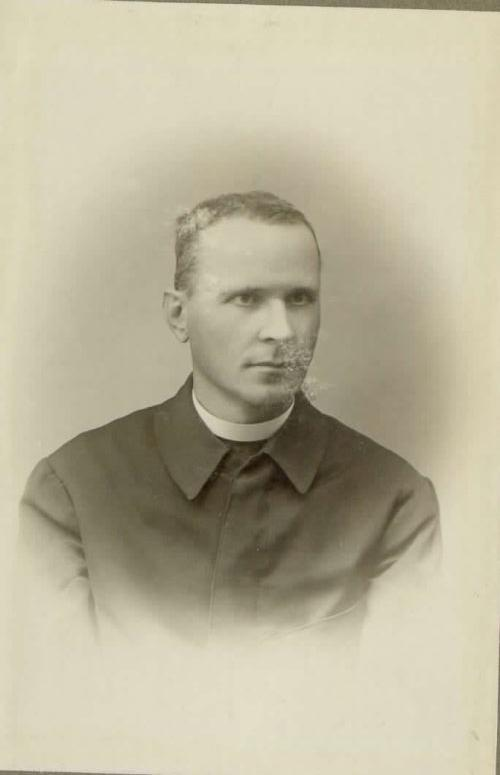
- Janez Kalan

Orders
- Ordination: 1891

Personal details
- Born: Janez Kalan; 20 October 1868 Suha, Škofja Loka, Slovenia
- Died: 27 April 1945 Ljubljana, Slovenia
- Denomination: Roman Catholic

Janez (Evangelist) Kalan (20 October 1868 – 27 April 1945), was a Slovene Roman Catholic priest, editor, and writer.

== Life ==
Kalan was born in the village of Suha. He attended elementary school in Škofja Loka, followed by secondary school (from 1879 to 1887) and seminary (from 1887 to 1891) in Ljubljana. He was ordained a priest in 1891, after which he served as a curate in Dol pri Ljubljani from 1891 to 1893 and in Kamnik from 1893 to 1900. From 1900 to 1904 he was a vicar in Ljubljana, and from 1904 to 1908 the parish priest in Zapoge.

From 1903 to 1924 he was the Episcopal head of the campaign against alcoholism; he left his position as parish priest in 1908 in order to dedicate himself to this task. His zeal against alcohol earned him the deprecatory nickname Wasserkalan 'water Kalan'. In 1903 he founded the religious monthly periodical Bogoljub (God’s Love) and edited it until the end of 1924, when he left to serve among Slovene workers in North Rhine-Westphalia. In 1923 he also served as a missionary among Slovene emigrants in southern Serbia. Kalan wrote a number of books.

== Work ==
In 1903 Kalan founded the Sveta vojska (Holy Army) anti-alcohol association, the work of which was propagated in the newsletters Zlata doba (Golden Age; 1910–1920) and Prerodu (Rebirth, 1922–). In 1913 he started publishing the professional clerical newsletter Vzajemnost (Reciprocity) and edited it until 1924. In 1916, together with Anton Mrkun he founded the Dobrodelnost (Charity) charitable association. In 1925 he started publishing the newsletter Naš zvon (Our Bell) in Germany. In addition to his publications in the newsletters that he edited, he also contributed to the newspapers Slovenec and Domoljub.

== Bibliography ==
- Vodnik marijanski COBISS 6208771
- Družabnik Marijin COBISS 91483648
- Šmarnice arskega župnika COBISS 87398912
- Bog med nami COBISS 91484672
- Kristus kraljuj COBISS 1609987
- Pridige enega leta: za vse nedelje, praznike in posebne prilike COBISS 91481600
- Početek protialkoholnega gibanja na Slovenskem COBISS 512074782
- Kaj je torej z alkoholizmom? COBISS 83688192
- Sveta vojska COBISS 52658688
- Konec pravdi o alkoholu COBISS 7509251
- Velik moment COBISS 130676
- Slovensko dekle COBISS 91481344
- K višku zdaj dežela vsa COBISS 6227715
- Primite tatu COBISS 512234293
- Zločin nad domovino COBISS 40339713
- S krampom in gorjačo COBISS 101966080
- Ajmo, mi Sokoli COBISS 91484928
- Nova vera COBISS 91482368
- Fantič, le gori vstan! COBISS 512248629
- Pozdrav iz domovine COBISS 35900673
- Pojte! COBISS 512245301
- Prepevajte! COBISS 43768321
- Da se poznamo COBISS 40908289
- Rešimo slovenščino COBISS 37554433
- Za lepo, domačo slovenščino COBISS 37555457
