= Spodnji Otok =

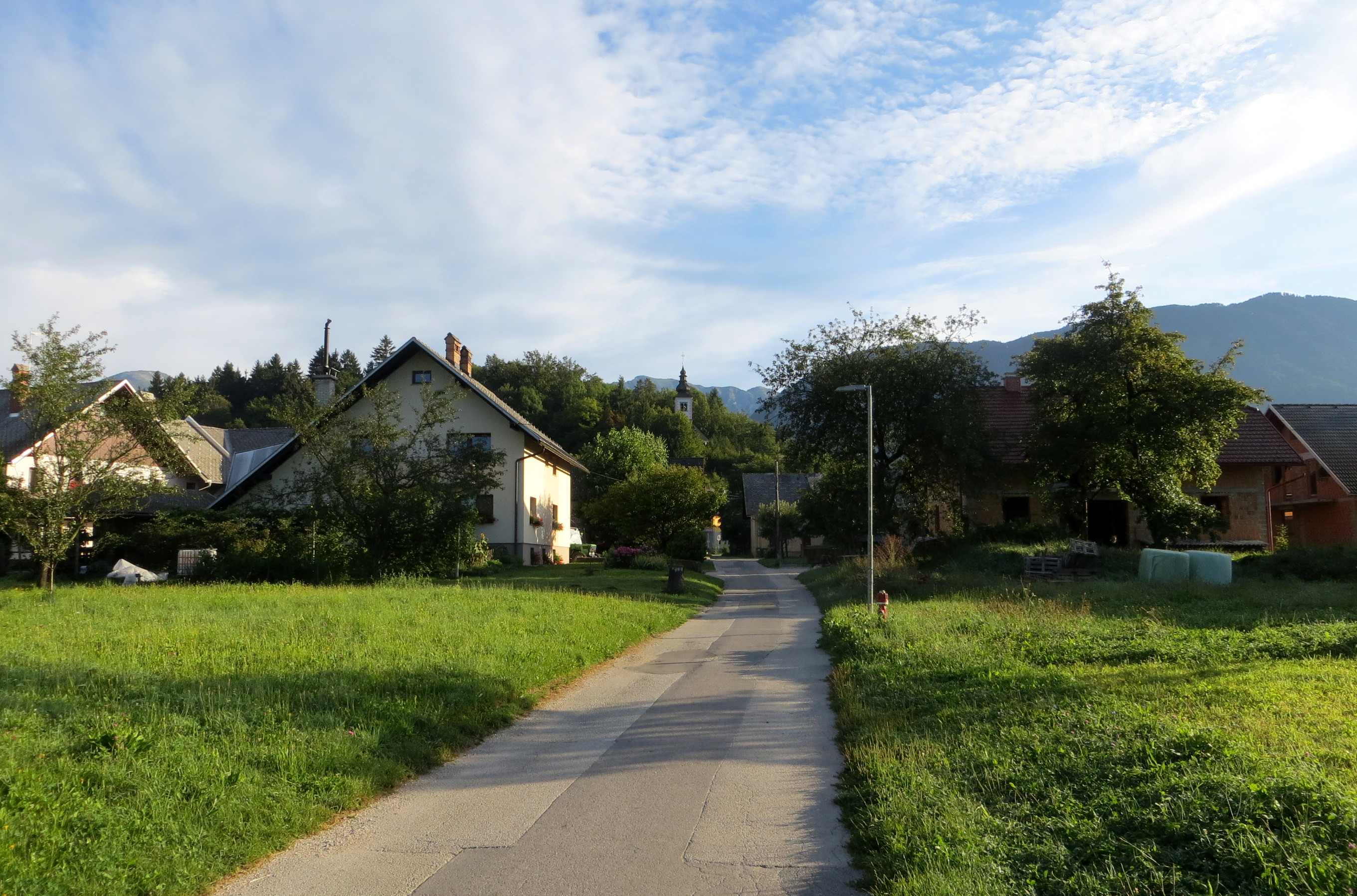

- Location in Slovenia
- Coordinates: 46°20′44″N 14°13′23″E
- Country: Slovenia
- Region: Upper Carniola
- Statistical region: Upper Carniola
- Municipality: Radovljica
- Elevation: 494 m (1,621 ft)

Population (2002)
  - Total: 147

Spodnji Otok (pronounced [ˈspoːdnji ˈɔːtɔk], German: Unterotok) is a village in the Municipality of Radovljica in the Upper Carniola region of Slovenia.

== Name ==
The name Spodnji Otok (literally, 'lower Otok') is paired with that of neighboring Zgornji Otok (literally, 'upper Otok'), which stands about 8 meters (26 ft) higher in elevation. Together with Zgornji Otok, both villages were attested with the German name Werd in 1326, which, like Slovene Otok, means 'island'. Like settlements with the semantically corresponding name Verd, the name refers not only to an island, but also to an elevated location next to a marsh or other wetland.

== History ==
Between 1326 and 1331 two members of Polish gentry, Jurij and Nikolaj, moved to the area and Jurij had his mansion in Spodnji Otok. Part of this lineage is mentioned as living in the area during the early period of reign of the Counts of Celje.

== Church ==
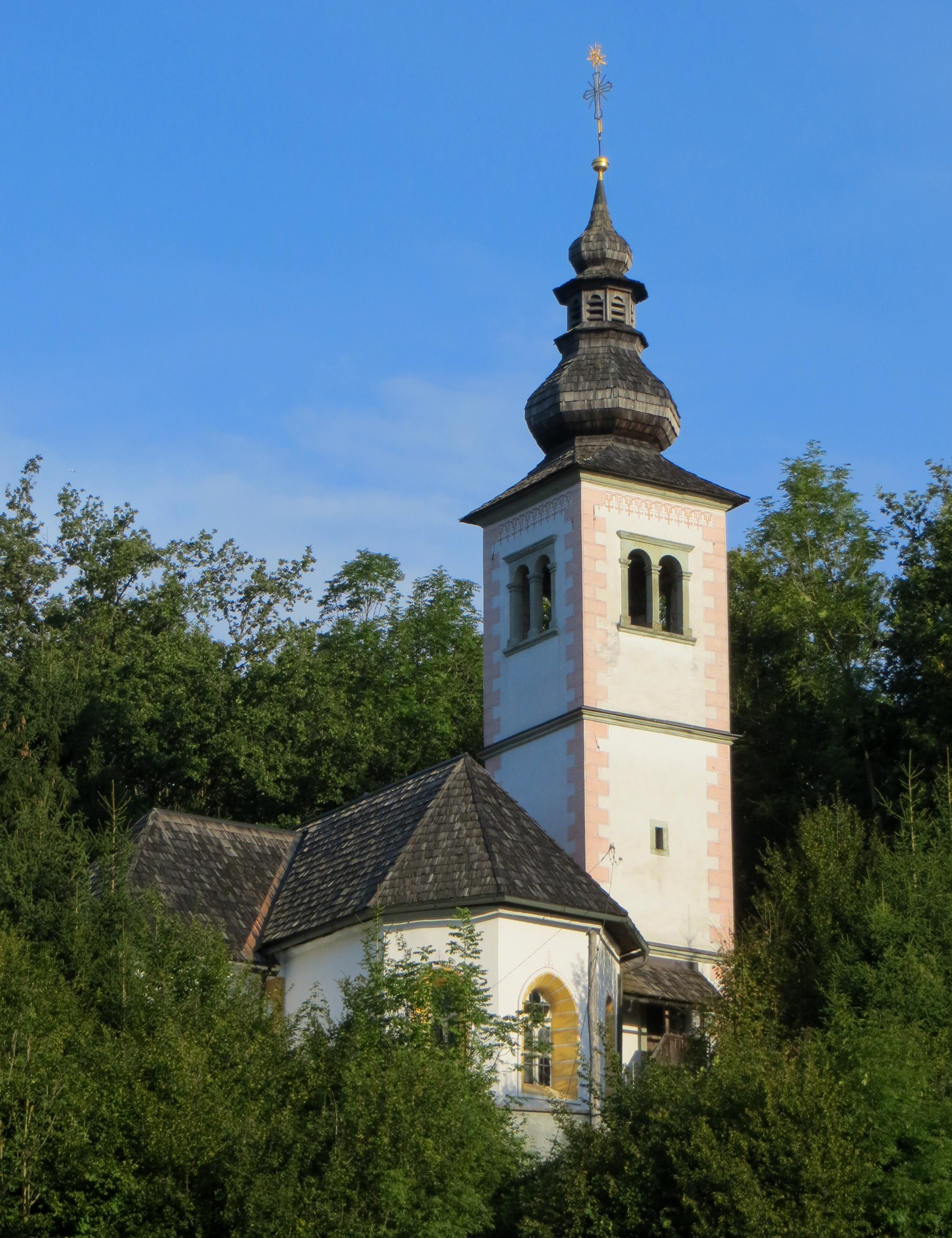
Saint John the Baptist Church

Saint John the Baptist Church stands on a hill right by the village. In the 15th and 16th centuries during the period of Turkish raids it was a defence post, protected by defensive walls. Legends say that the church bells would start ringing of their own accord when the enemy would approach and scare them away. In remembrance of these raids the bells are still rung every day at eleven o'clock. The church is decorated with frescos from around 1460. The frescos on the portico painted by Jernej of Loka are largely lost, but the remaining frescos were recently restored and conserved.

== Notable people ==
Notable people that were born or lived in Spodnji Otok include:

- Ivan Murnik (1839–1913), politician
