= Četena Ravan =

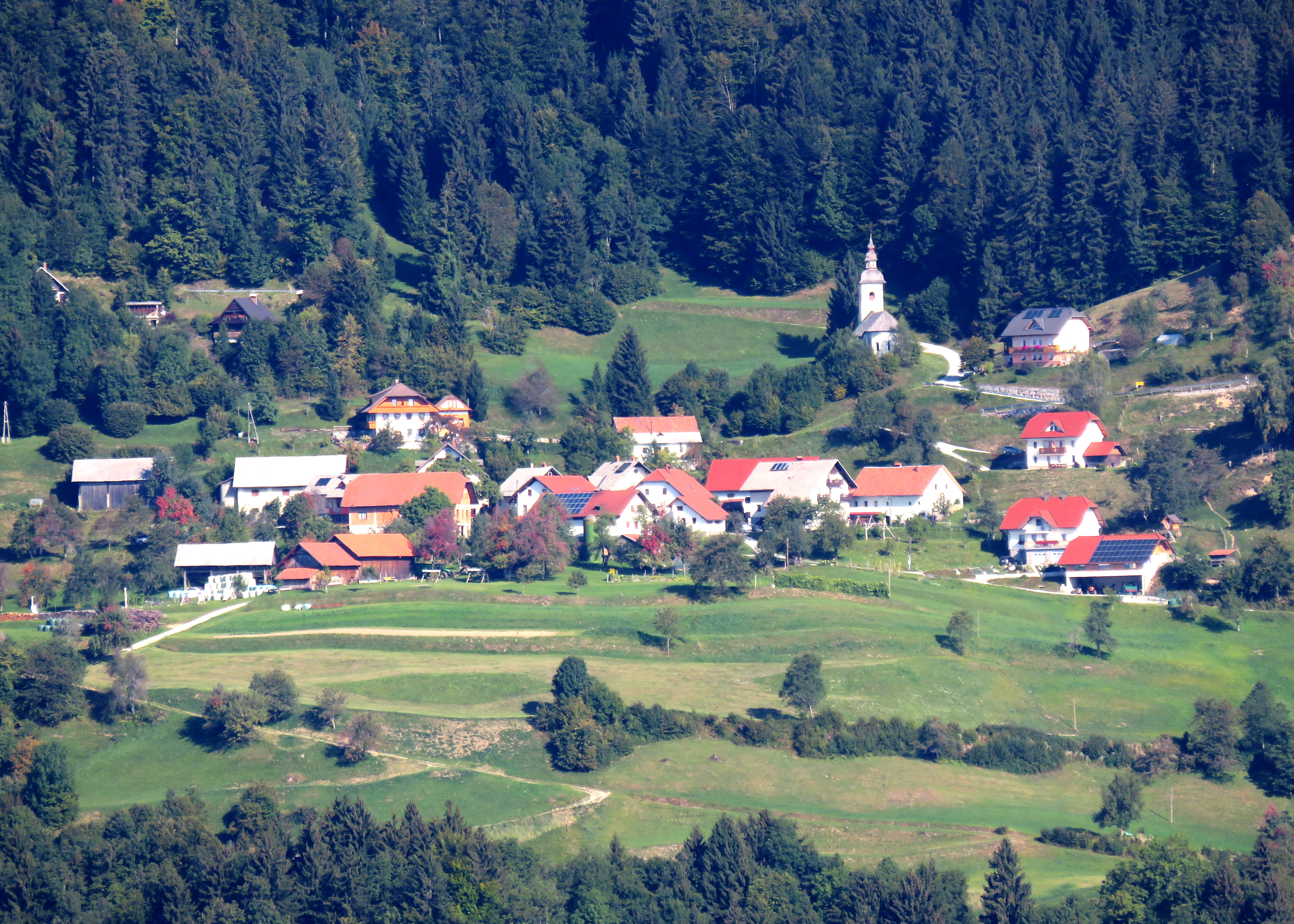

- Location in Slovenia
- Coordinates: 46°10′2.1″N 14°11′5.77″E
- Country: Slovenia
- Traditional region: Upper Carniola
- Statistical region: Upper Carniola
- Municipality: Gorenja Vas–Poljane

Area
  - Total: 0.59 km^{2} (0.23 sq mi)
- Elevation: 895 m (2,936 ft)

Population (2020)
  - Total: 50
  - Density: 85/km^{2} (220/sq mi)

Četena Ravan (pronounced [tʃɛˈteːna ɾaˈʋaːn]) is a small settlement in the Municipality of Gorenja Vas–Poljane in the Upper Carniola region of Slovenia.

== Name ==
Četena Ravan was attested in historical sources as Seteneraun in 1291, Tanawren and Zeta Nawren in 1453, and Czetenorawen in 1500, among other spellings. The name is derived from the verb črtati 'to clear (land)', and thus means 'cleared plateau'. The common noun ravan 'flatland, plateau' is relatively common in Slovene toponyms.

== Church ==
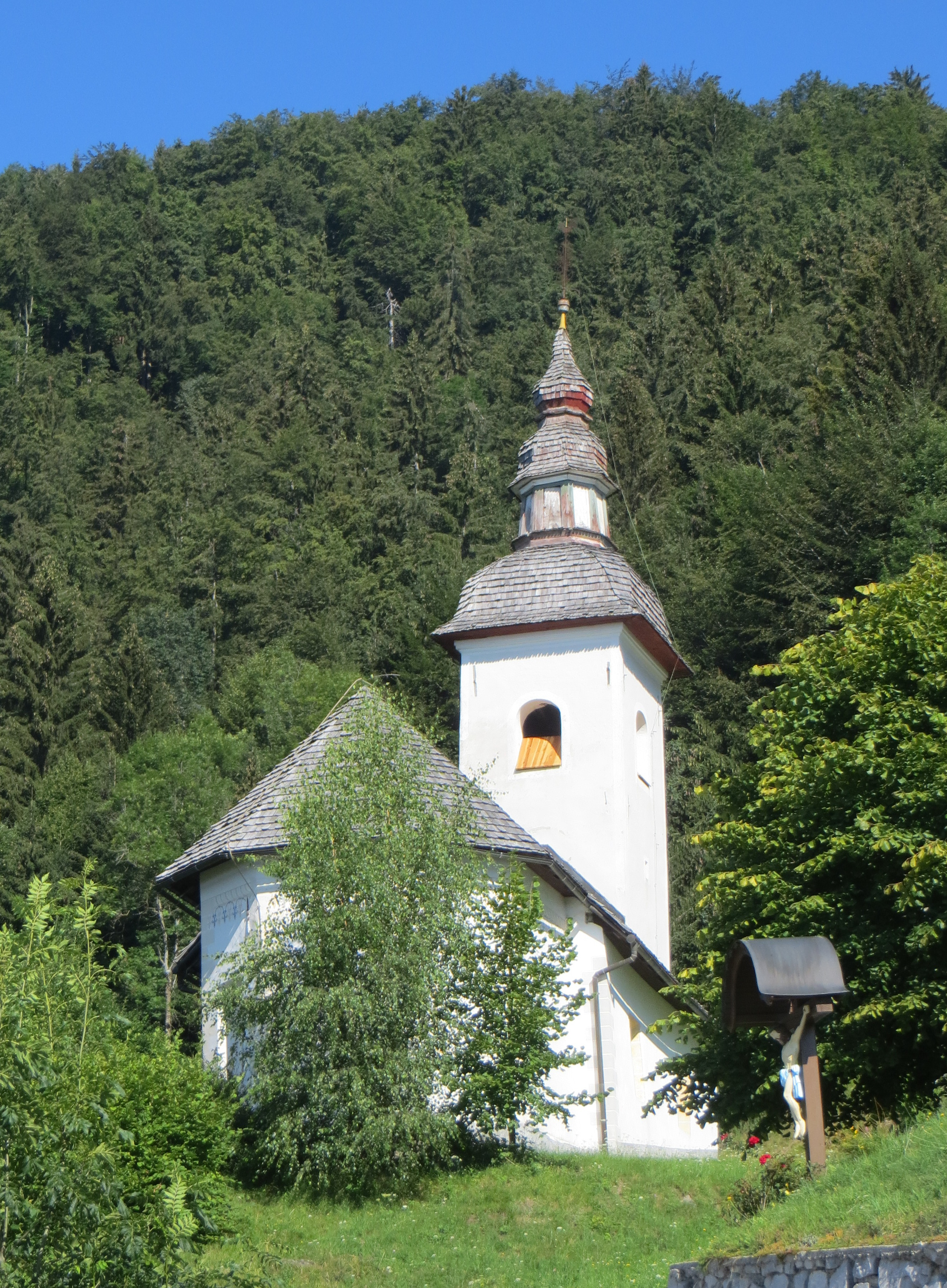
Saint Brice's Church

The local church is dedicated to Saint Brice (Slovene: sveti Brikcij). It is a late Gothic structure with a five-sided apse and a square nave. Although it was extended in the late 18th century, early 16th-century frescos, some painted by Jernej of Loka, survive in the sanctuary. The main altar dates to the late 17th century with 16th-century statues.
