= Suha, Škofja Loka =

Suha
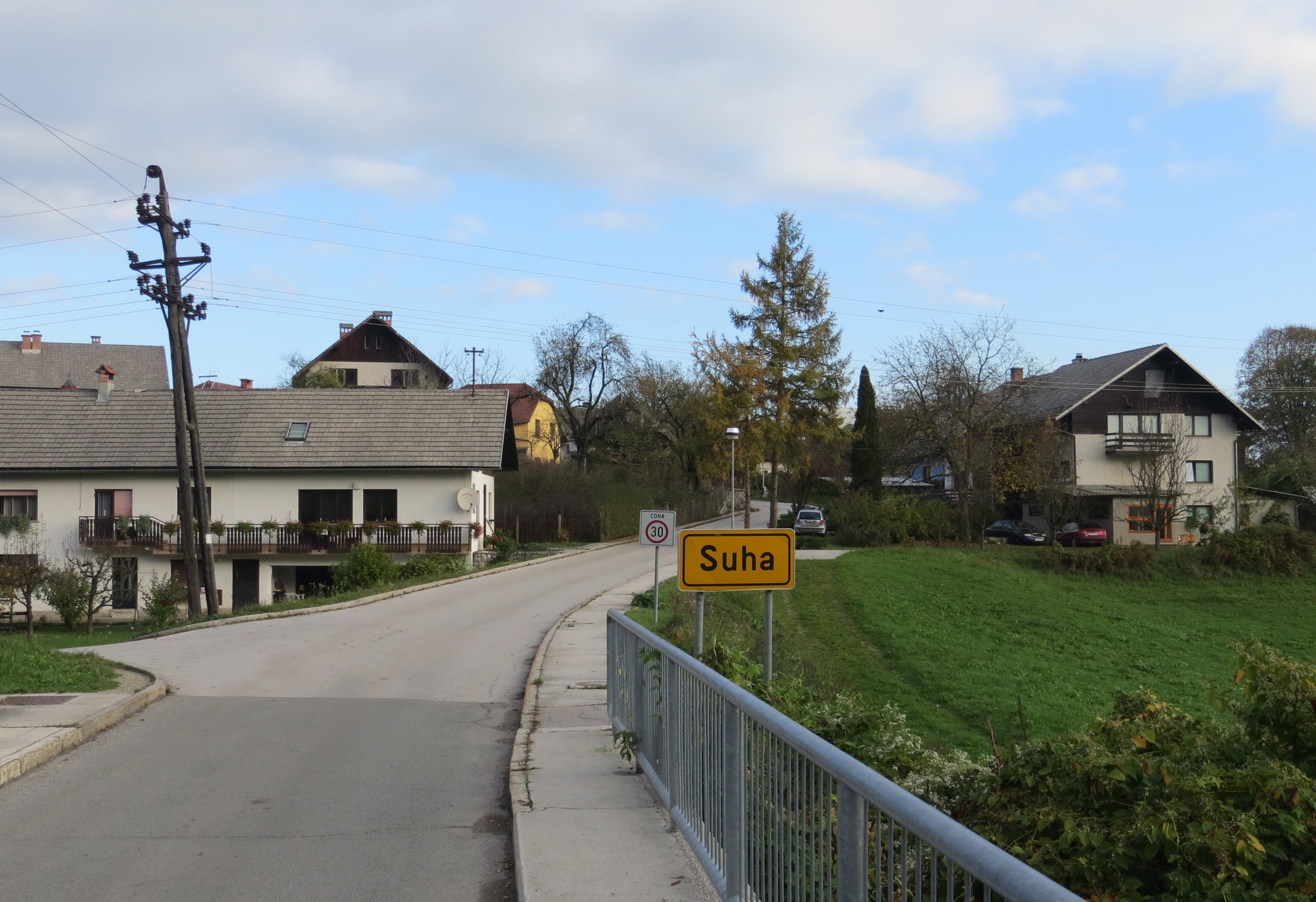

- Location in Slovenia
- Coordinates: 46°9′52.72″N 14°19′26.58″E
- Country: Slovenia
- Traditional region: Upper Carniola
- Statistical region: Upper Carniola
- Municipality: Škofja Loka

Area
  - Total: 0.49 km^{2} (0.19 sq mi)
- Elevation: 341.5 m (1,120 ft)

Population (2002)
  - Total: 158

Suha (pronounced [ˈsuːxa]; German: Zauchen) is a village just outside Škofja Loka in the Upper Carniola region of Slovenia. It is an old settlement, with its earliest mention in documents dating to AD 973.

== Church ==
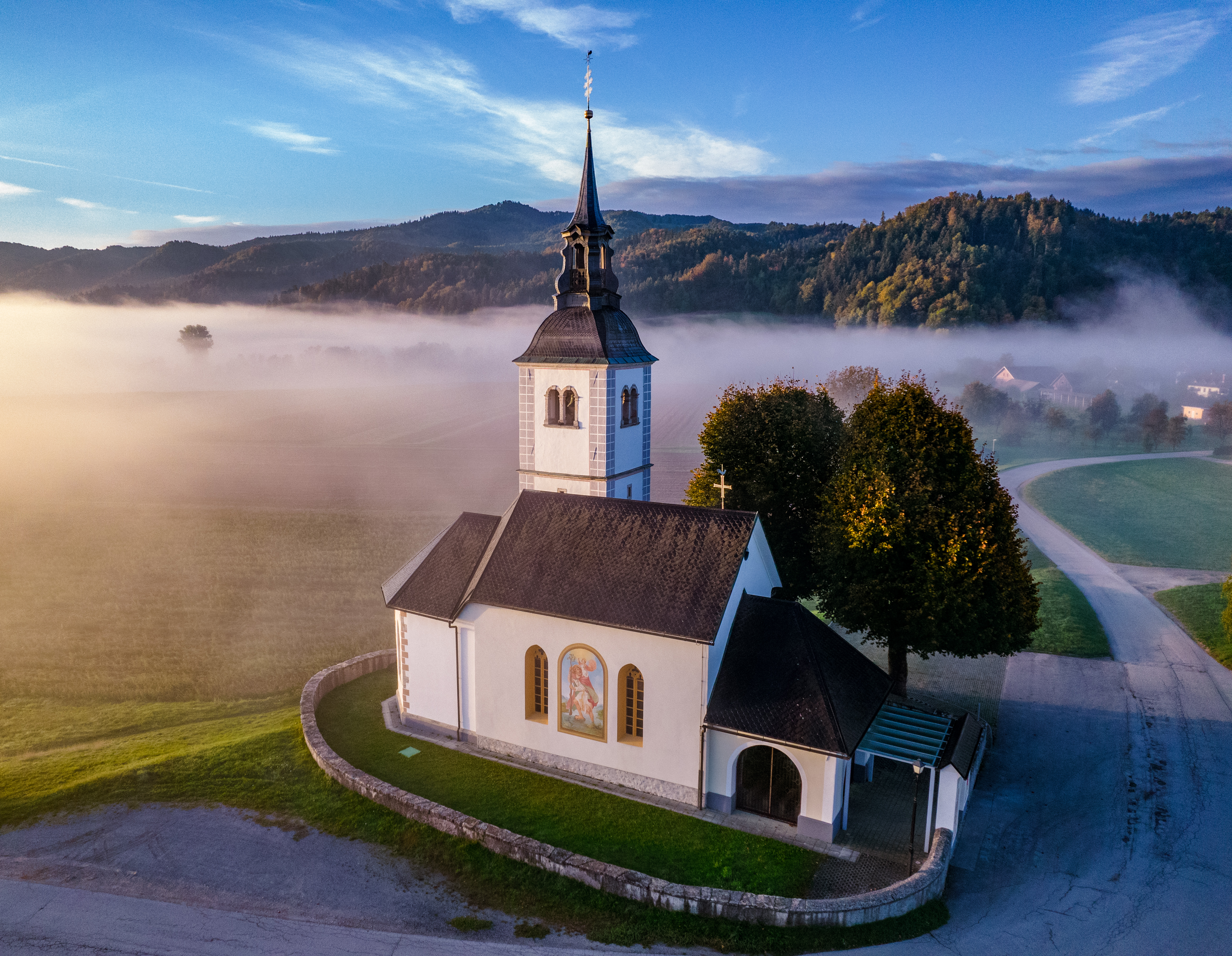
Saint John the Baptist Church

There are a number of interesting architectural monuments in the centre of the village, but Suha is best known for its parish church (until 1975 belonging to the Parish of Škofja Loka) dedicated to John the Baptist. It has a Gothic star-vaulted chancel. Frescos from the mid-15th century survive, painted by the unnamed painter known as the Master of Suha, known to have worked in a number of other local churches, but named after his work in this church because it is one of the best examples of his work. There are also 16th-century frescos by Jernej of Loka in the church. The well-preserved frescos are some of the most important in Slovenia and the church has been listed as a monument of national importance.

== Notable people ==
Notable people that were born or lived in Suha include:

- Andrej Glavan (1943–), the Bishop of Novo Mesto, the first parish priest of the Parish of Suha
- Janez Kalan (1868–1945), priest, editor, and writer
- Ahacij Stržinar (a.k.a. Achatius Sterschiner, 1676–1741), priest and religious writer
