= Bukovščica =

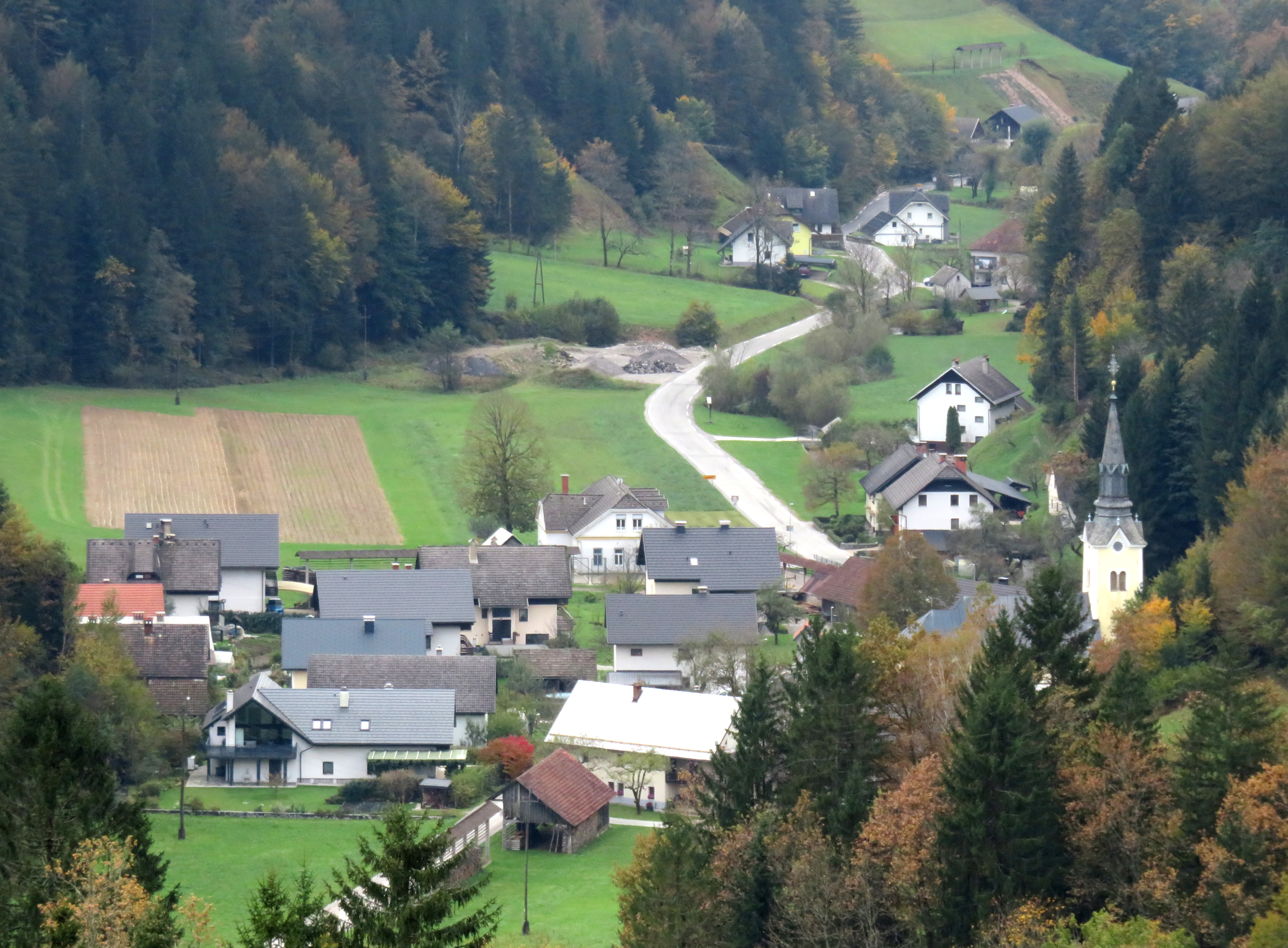

- Location in Slovenia
- Coordinates: 46°13′26.42″N 14°15′44.16″E
- Country: Slovenia
- Traditional region: Upper Carniola
- Statistical region: Upper Carniola
- Municipality: Škofja Loka

Area
  - Total: 2.42 km^{2} (0.93 sq mi)
- Elevation: 447.2 m (1,467 ft)

Population (2002)
  - Total: 139

Bukovščica (pronounced [ˈbuːkɔu̯ʃtʃitsa]; previously Klemen or Sveti Klemen, German: Sankt Clementis) is a village in the Municipality of Škofja Loka in the Upper Carniola region of Slovenia.

== Geography ==
Bukovščica includes the hamlets of Hrib, Dunaj, Laško, and Plana. The name Laško is unrelated to the adjective laški 'Italian; Romance-speaking' (cf. Laško). Instead, it is derived from the common noun laz 'grassy clearing'. Because the name Laško was misunderstood as meaning 'Italy', the nearby hamlet of Dunaj (literally 'Vienna') was given its name as a jocular counterpart.

== Church ==
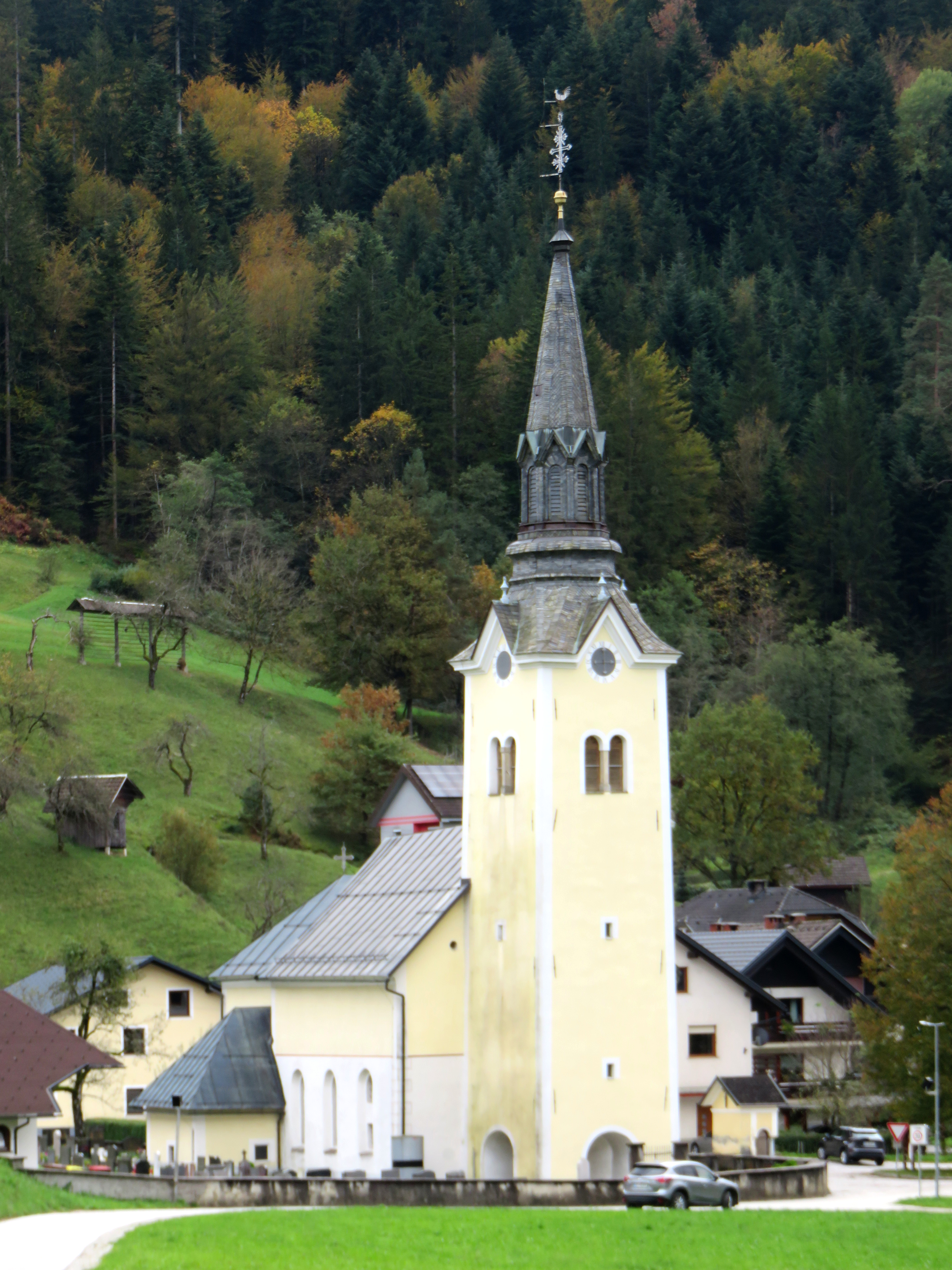
View from northwest

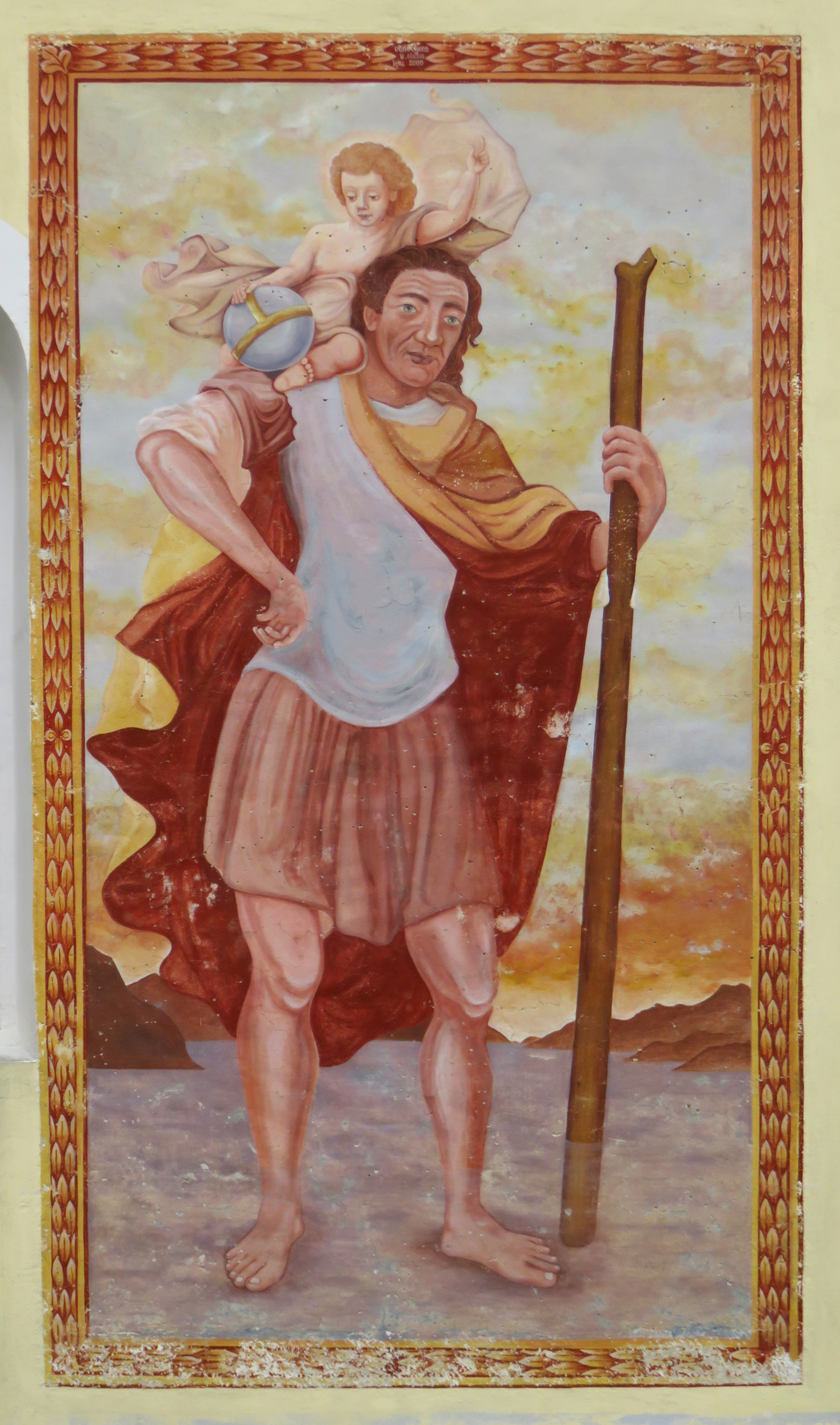
Fresco

Saint Clement's Church

The local church is dedicated to Saint Clement. Its rectangular nave indicates Romanesque origins, but the church was rebuilt several times. There is a fresco of Saint Christopher on the south wall of the sanctuary painted by Janez Gosar (1830–1887). Some of the frescoes were painted by Jernej of Loka. The main altar dates to 1851, and the Stations of the Cross are by Leopold Layer.
