= Sveti Andrej, Škofja Loka =

Sveti Andrej Andrej nad Zmincem (1955–1997)
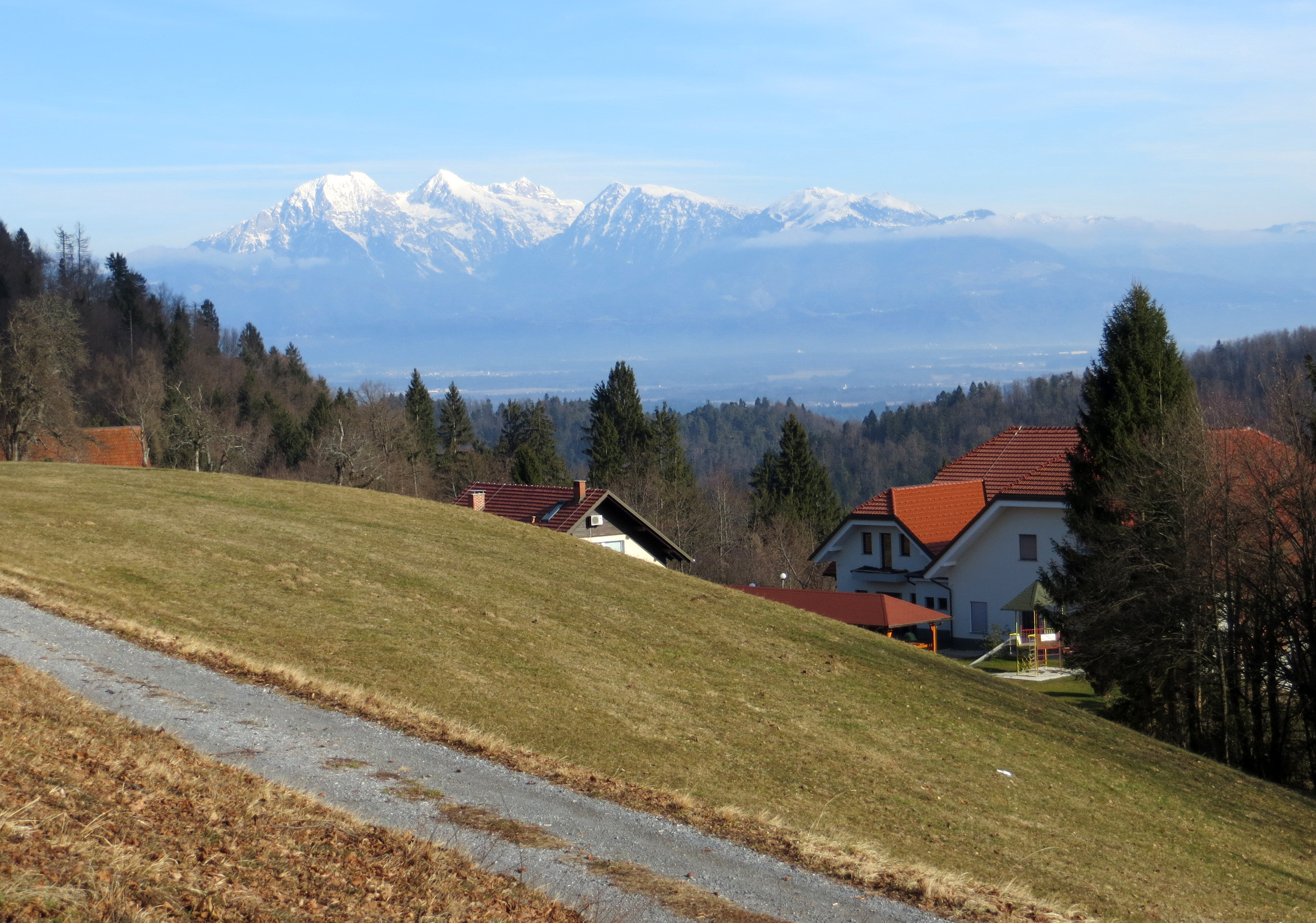

- Location in Slovenia
- Coordinates: 46°7′59.52″N 14°18′6.43″E
- Country: Slovenia
- Traditional region: Upper Carniola
- Statistical region: Upper Carniola
- Municipality: Škofja Loka

Area
  - Total: 3.33 km^{2} (1.29 sq mi)
- Elevation: 595.6 m (1,954 ft)

Population (2002)
  - Total: 92

Sveti Andrej (pronounced [ˈsʋeːti anˈdɾeːi̯]; German: Sankt Andrä) is a settlement in the Municipality of Škofja Loka in the Upper Carniola region of Slovenia.

== Name ==
The name of the settlement was changed from Sveti Andrej (literally, 'Saint Andrew') to Andrej nad Zmincem (literally, 'Andrew above Zminec') in 1955. The name was changed on the basis of the 1948 Law on Names of Settlements and Designations of Squares, Streets, and Buildings as part of efforts by Slovenia's postwar communist government to remove religious elements from toponyms. The name Sveti Andrej was restored in 1997. In the past the German name was Sankt Andrä.

== Church ==
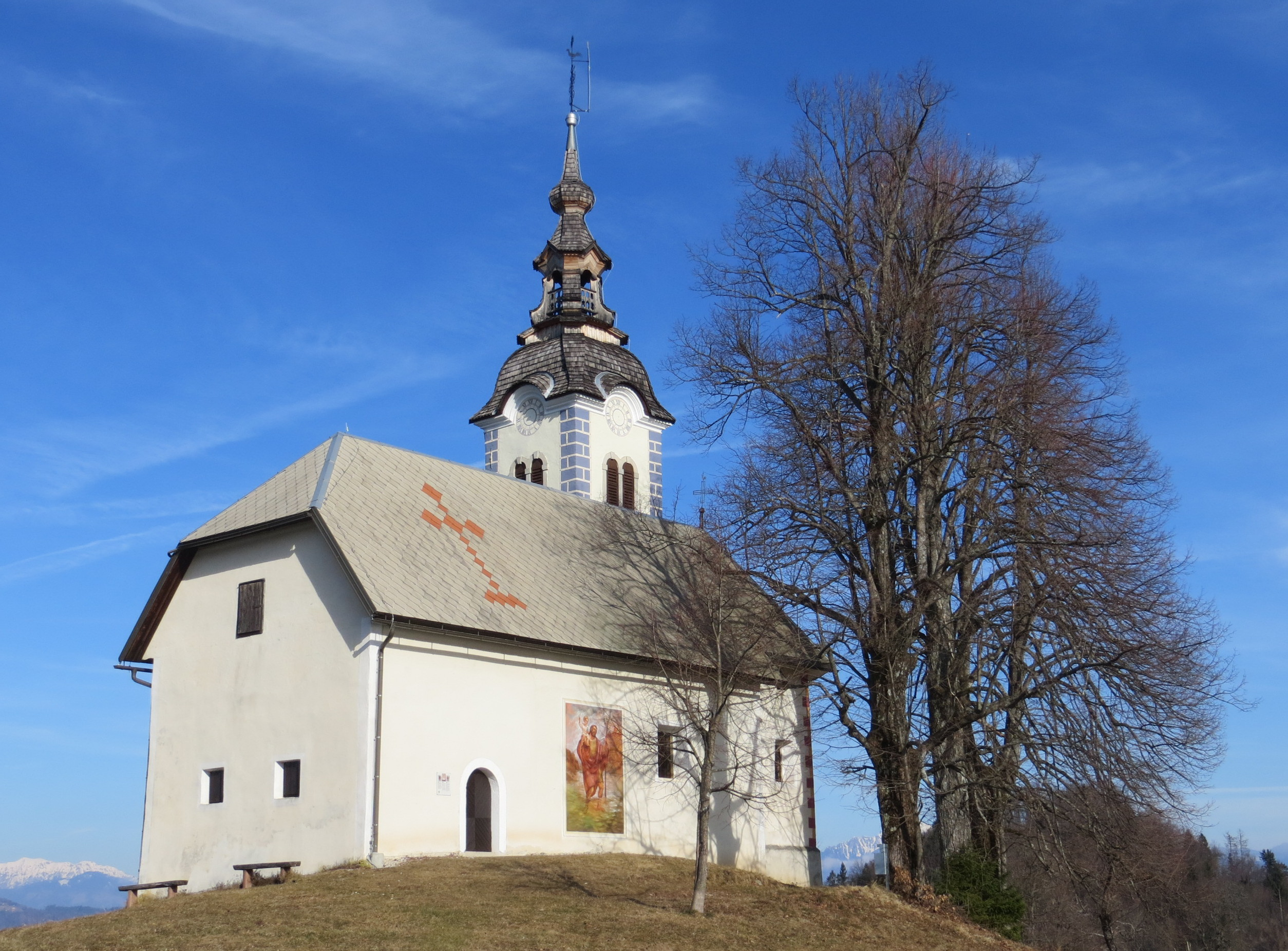
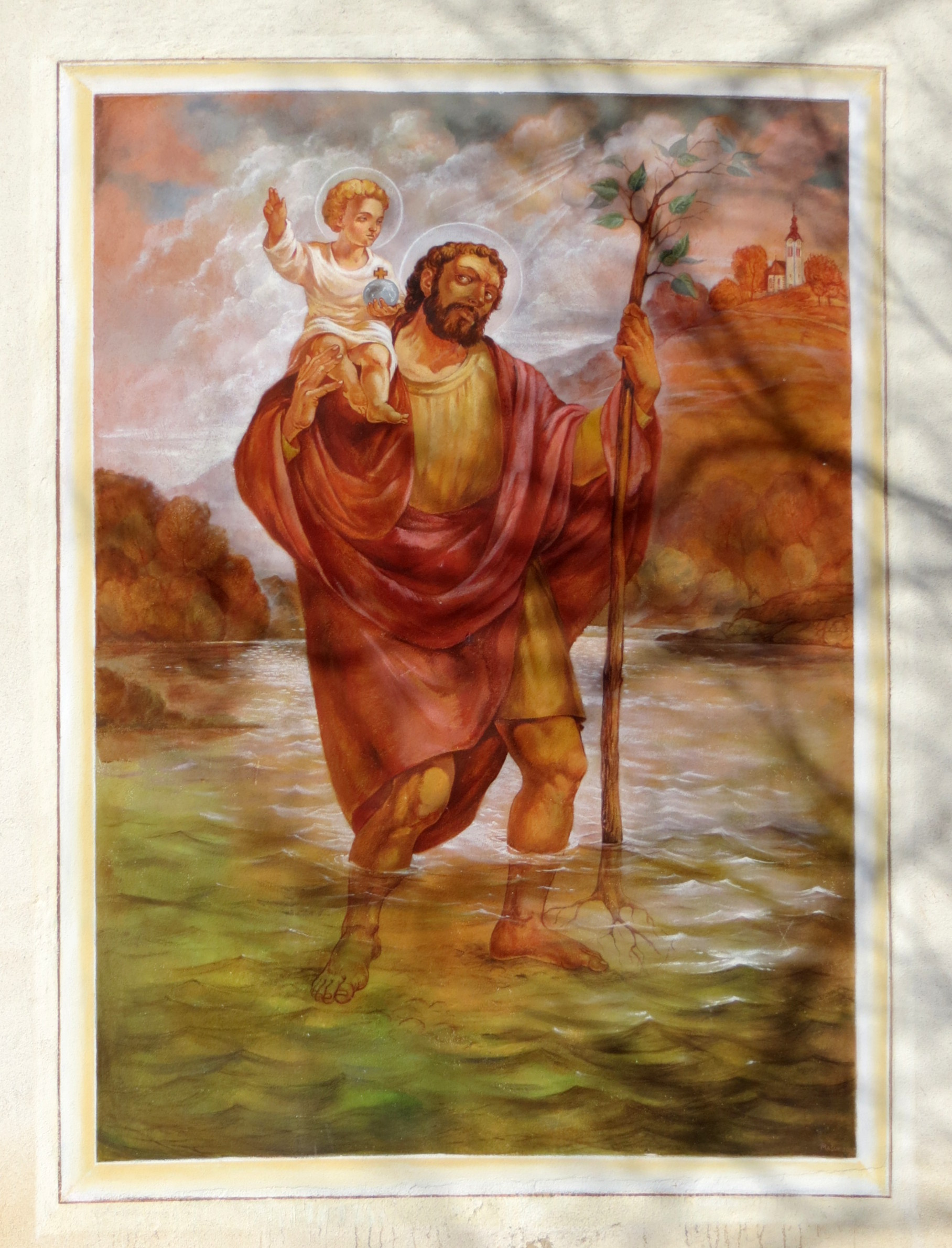
Saint Andrew's Church and fresco on southeast wall

The local church, built on a hill above the settlement, is dedicated to Saint Andrew. It is Late Gothic, dating to between 1520 and 1530. The nave was vaulted in 1831. The frescos in the sanctuary, behind the altar, and one on the exterior were painted by Jernej of Loka at the time the church was built and most of the remaining decoration is from the 17th century. The main altar dates to 1773 and the side altars are from the late 17th century.
