= Sveti Jošt nad Kranjem =

Sveti Jošt nad Kranjem Jošt nad Kranjem (1955–1990)
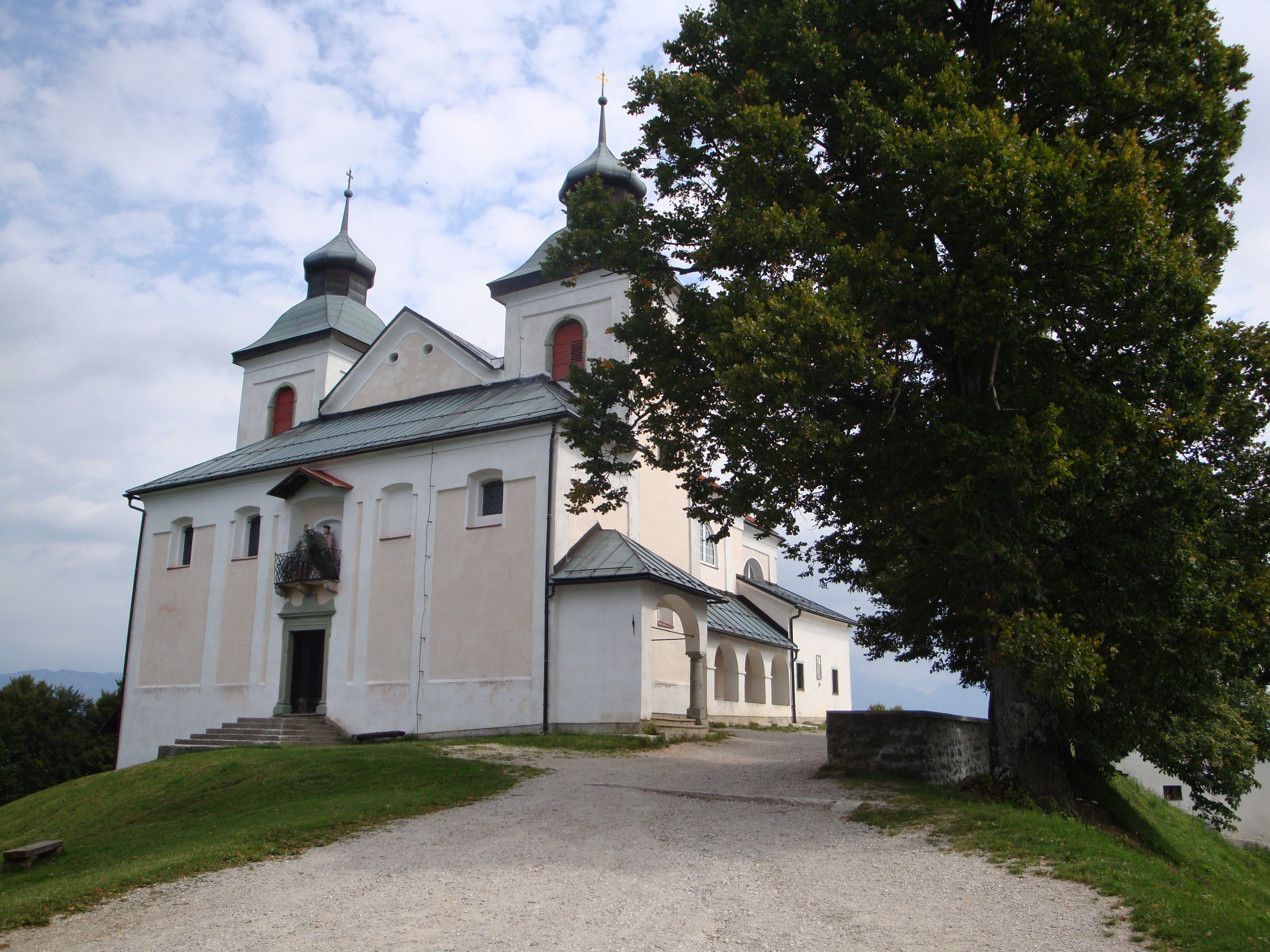

- Location in Slovenia
- Coordinates: 46°14′34″N 14°18′11″E
- Country: Slovenia
- Traditional region: Upper Carniola
- Statistical region: Upper Carniola
- Municipality: Kranj

Area
  - Total: 0.44 km^{2} (0.17 sq mi)
- Elevation: 847 m (2,779 ft)

Population (2002)
  - Total: 5

Sveti Jošt nad Kranjem (pronounced [ˈsʋeːti ˈjoːʃt nat ˈkɾaːnjɛm]; German: Sankt Jodoci) is a settlement on a hill of the same name east of Kranj in the Upper Carniola region of Slovenia. It is centered on the church of Saint Judoc (Slovene: sveti Jošt), a landmark of Kranj, visible from afar.

== Name ==
The name of the settlement was changed from Sveti Jošt (literally, 'Saint Jodocus') to Jošt nad Kranjem (literally, 'Jodocus above Kranj') in 1955. The name was changed on the basis of the 1948 Law on Names of Settlements and Designations of Squares, Streets, and Buildings as part of efforts by Slovenia's postwar communist government to remove religious elements from toponyms. The name was changed again to Sveti Jošt nad Kranjem in 1990. In the past the German name was Sankt Jodoci.

== Church ==
St. Judoc's Church was first mentioned in documents relating to the bequest of land by Emperor Otto II to the Bishops of Freising in 973. The earliest surviving part of the church is the gothic sanctuary in which frescos by Jernej of Loka dated to 1530 are preserved. The remainder of the church dates to the 18th century, when it was rebuilt in the Baroque style. The surrounding buildings were greatly damaged in the Second World War. The church used to be an important pilgrimage church, and is still a popular hiking destination.

The main bell of the church was cast in 1834, weighs 1,344 kilograms (2,963 lb), and has a striking tone of d♭′. It was made from the bronze of Ottoman ships sunk in the Battle of Navarino (1827), which was bought by Anton Samassa in Trieste. It bears an inscription by the Slovene Romantic poet France Prešeren: "My bronze was found at the bottom of the sea, when the kingdom of Turkey was ended in Helade by Navarino. It was bought by a pilgrim; cast into a bell by Samassa, now I announce God's honour from St. Jodocus's embrasures."

== Gallery ==
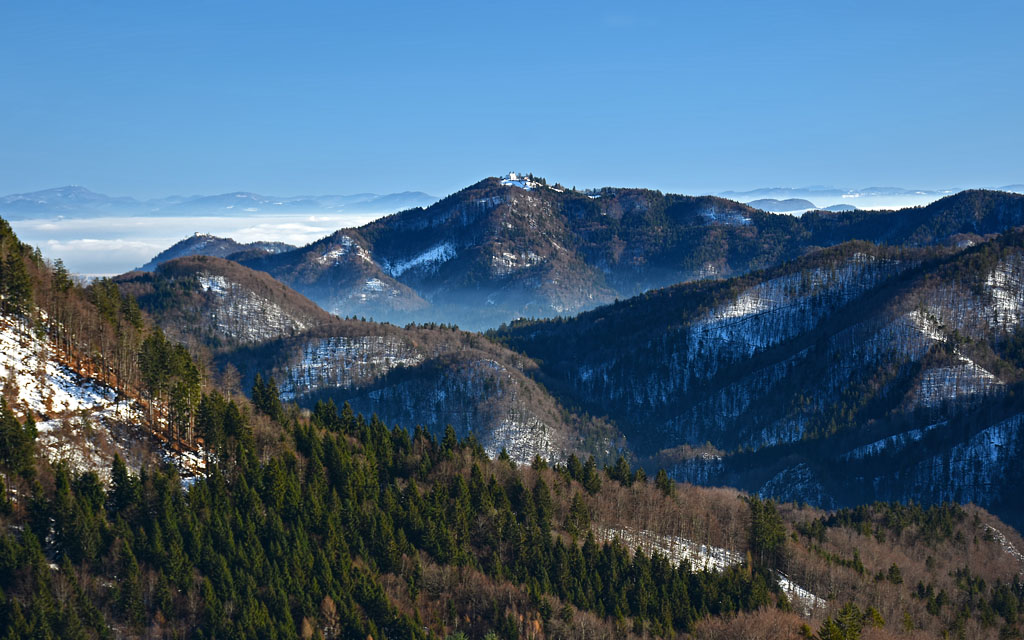
Sveti Jošt nad Kranjem from the northwest
