= Brod, Bohinj =

Brod
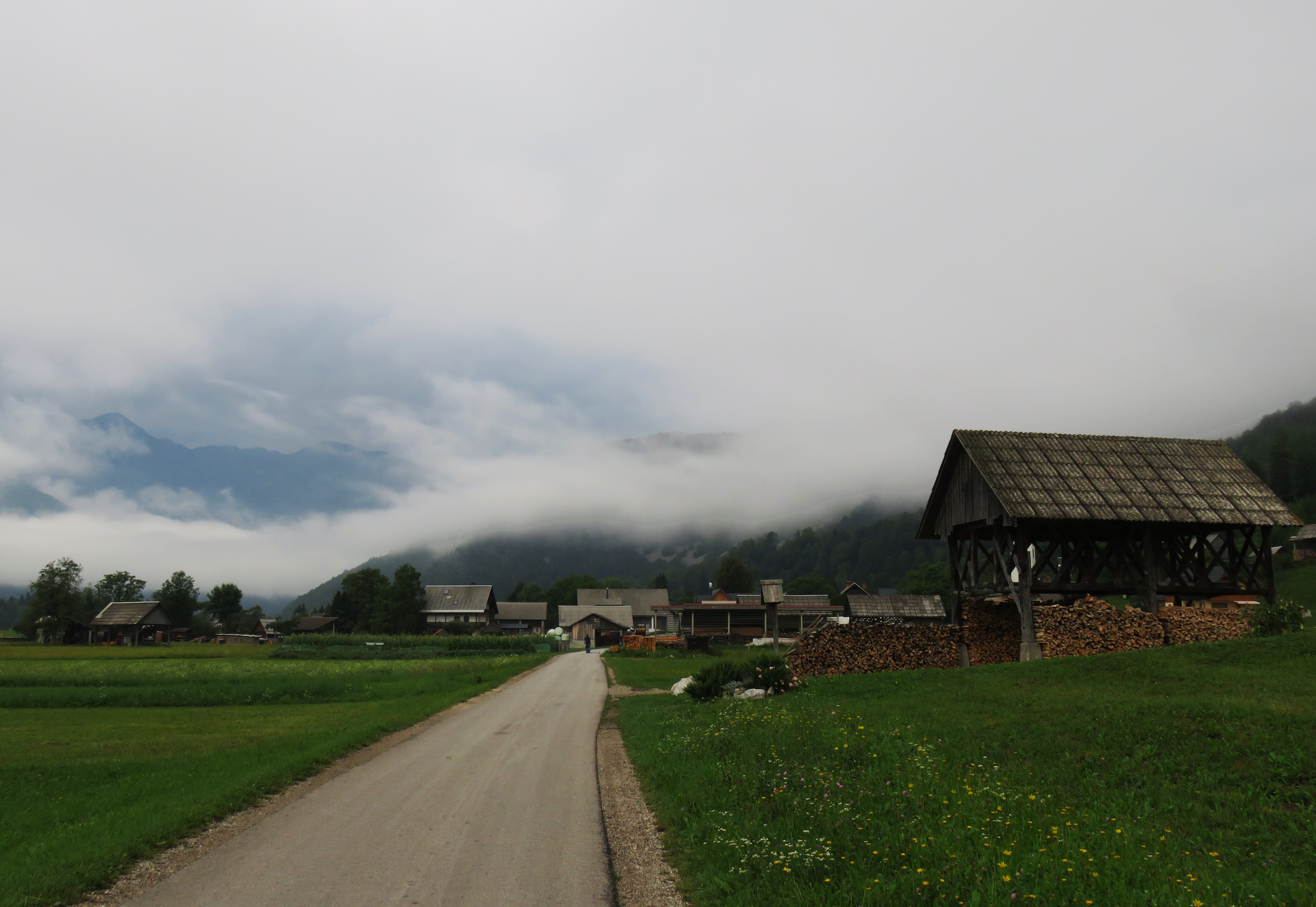

- Location in Slovenia
- Coordinates: 46°16′31.95″N 13°55′45.4″E
- Country: Slovenia
- Traditional region: Upper Carniola
- Statistical region: Upper Carniola
- Municipality: Bohinj
- Elevation: 512.1 m (1,680 ft)

Population (2020)
  - Total: 87

Brod (pronounced [ˈbɾoːt]) is a settlement on the left bank of the Sava Bohinjka River in the Municipality of Bohinj in the Upper Carniola region of Slovenia.

== Church ==
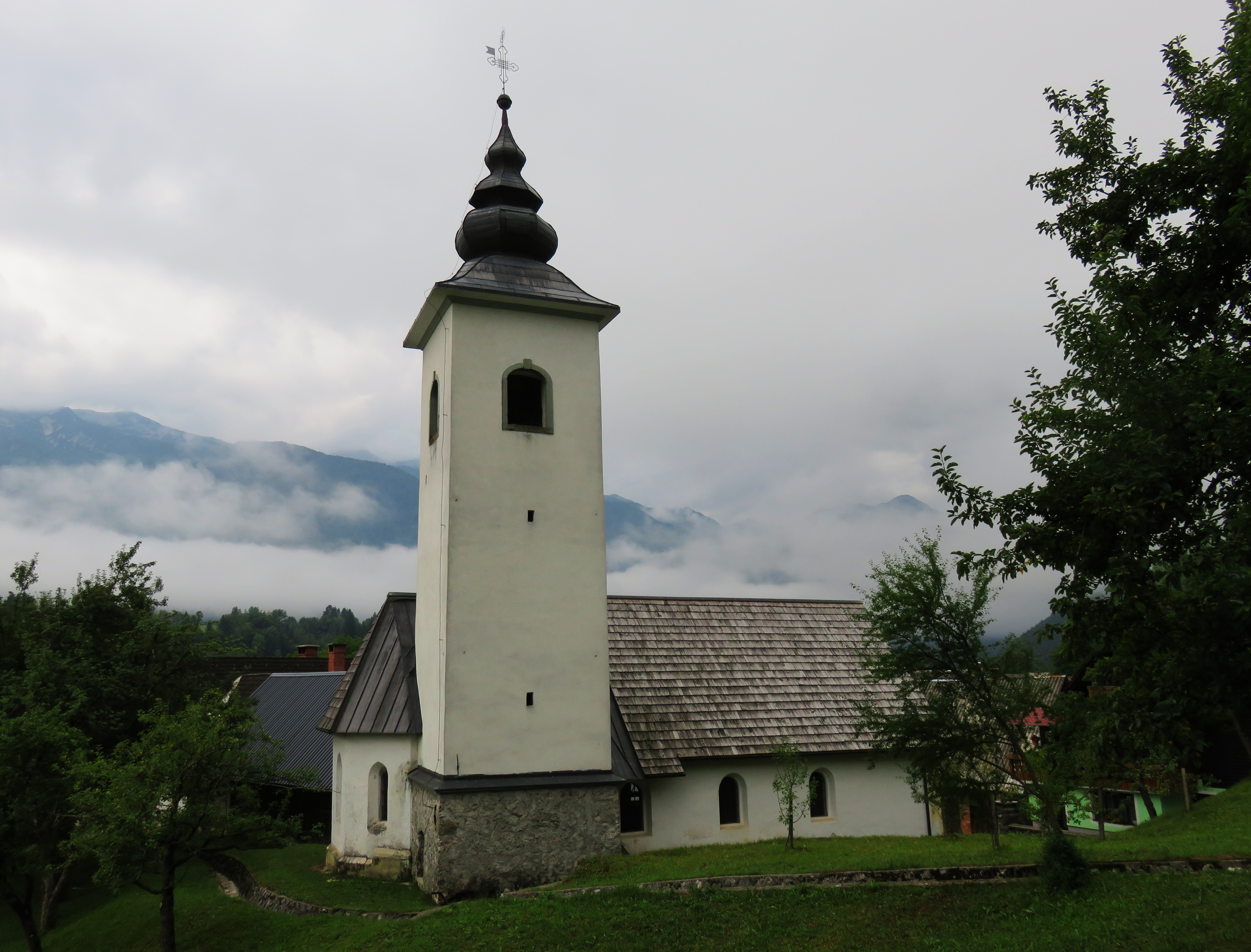
Saint Mary Magdalene Church

The local church is dedicated to Saint Mary Magdalene with preserved frescos dating to the 15th century as well as 16th-century frescoes painted by Jernej of Loka.
