= Križna Gora =

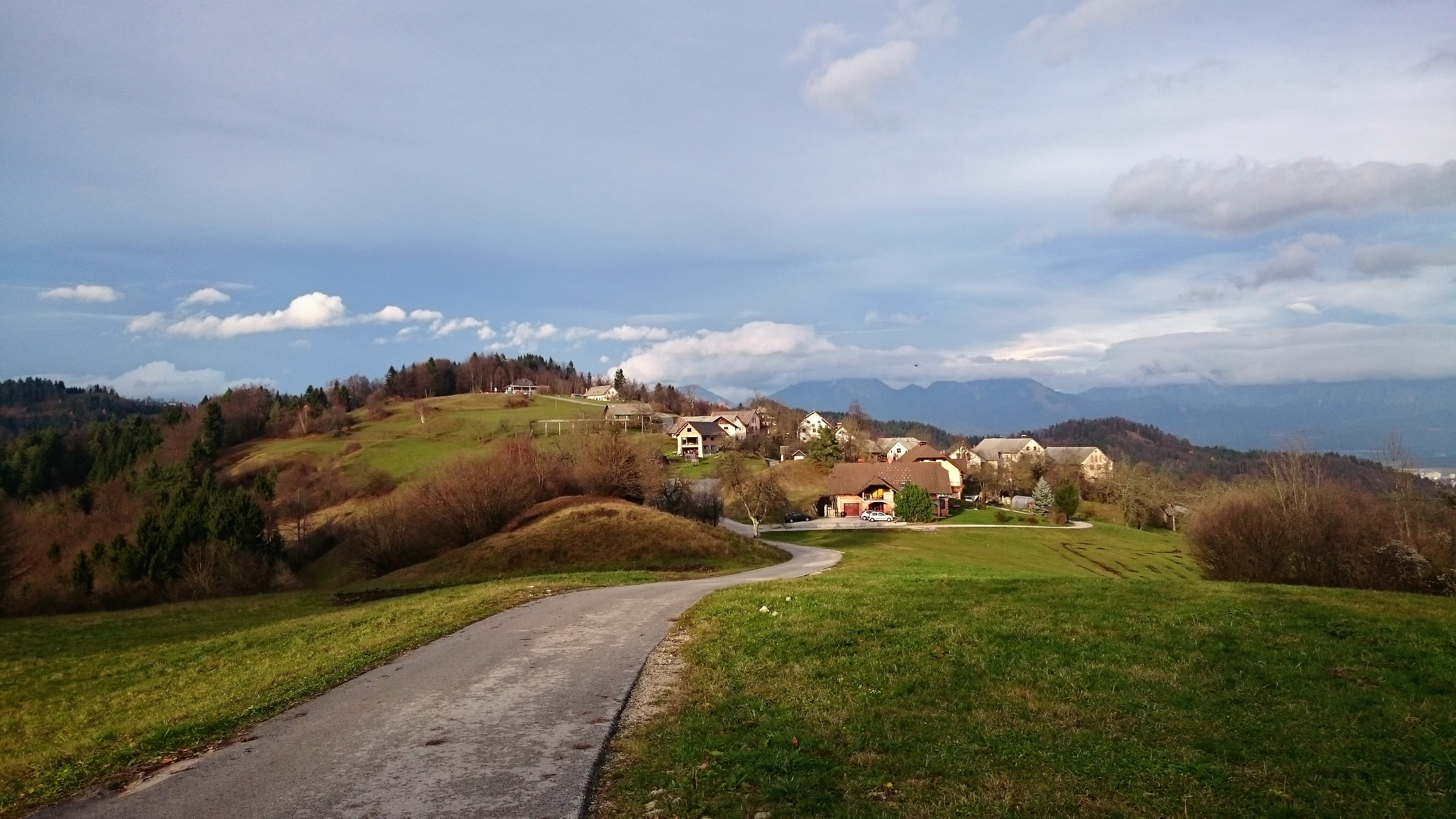

- Location in Slovenia
- Coordinates: 46°11′51.5″N 14°16′32.54″E
- Country: Slovenia
- Traditional region: Upper Carniola
- Statistical region: Upper Carniola
- Municipality: Škofja Loka

Area
  - Total: 2.41 km^{2} (0.93 sq mi)
- Elevation: 680.7 m (2,233 ft)

Population (2002)
  - Total: 102

Križna Gora (pronounced [ˈkɾiːʒna ˈɡɔːɾa]; German: Kreuzberg) is a small settlement northwest of Škofja Loka in the Municipality of Škofja Loka in the Upper Carniola region of Slovenia.

== Mass graves ==
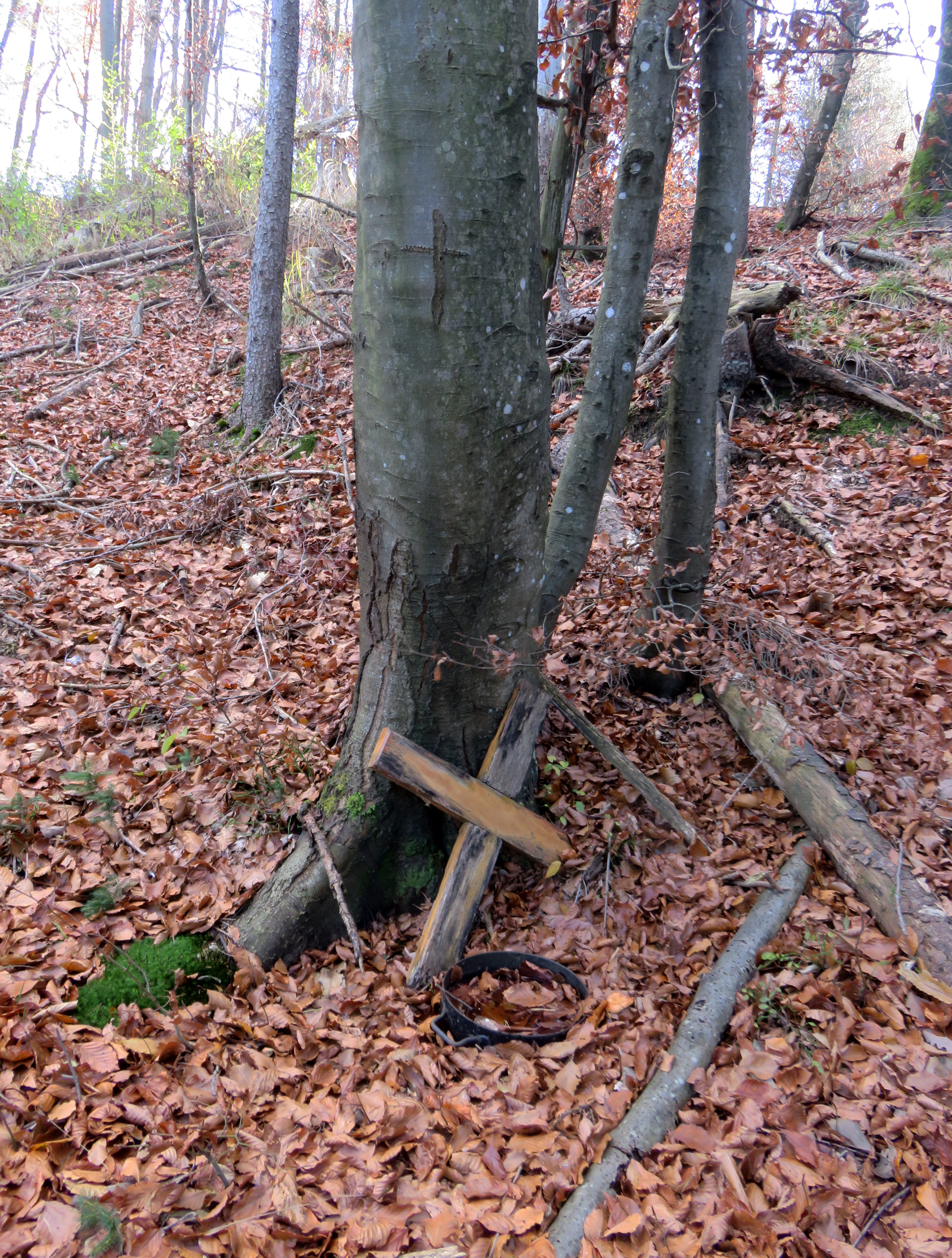
The Križna Gora Grave

Križna Gora is the site of a mass grave and a clandestine grave from the Second World War. The Gorge Peak Mass Grave (Slovene: Grobišče Vrh Soteske) lies in a sinkhole in the woods about 500 meters (1,600 ft) south of Holy Cross Church. It contains the remains of a family of four from Kranj that was murdered by the Partisans during the war. The Križna Gora Grave (Grobišče Križna Gora) lies on a steep slope west of the house at Križna Gora no. 22. It contains the remains of a local female civilian that was shot by Partisan political activists.

== Church ==
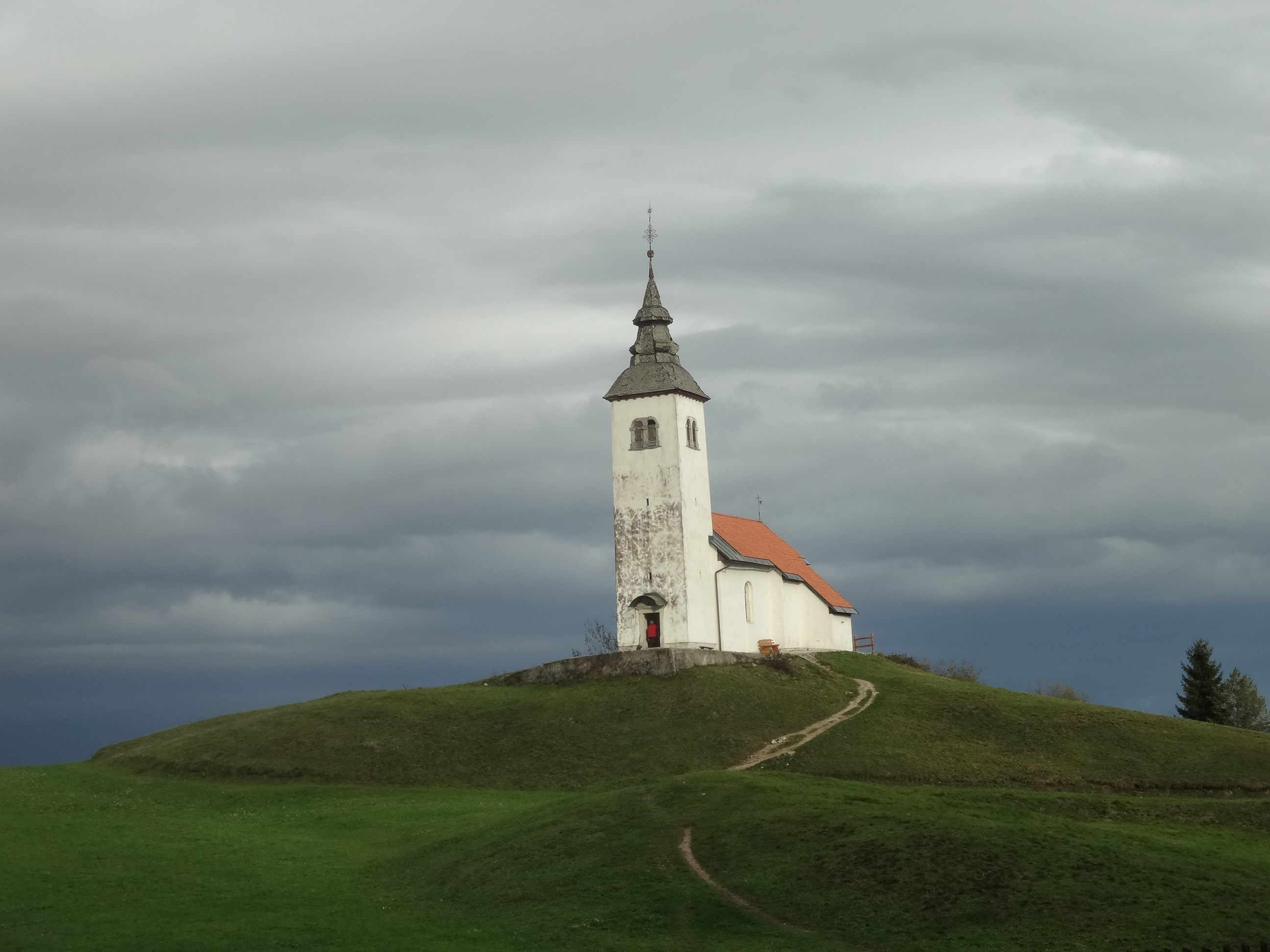
View from southwest

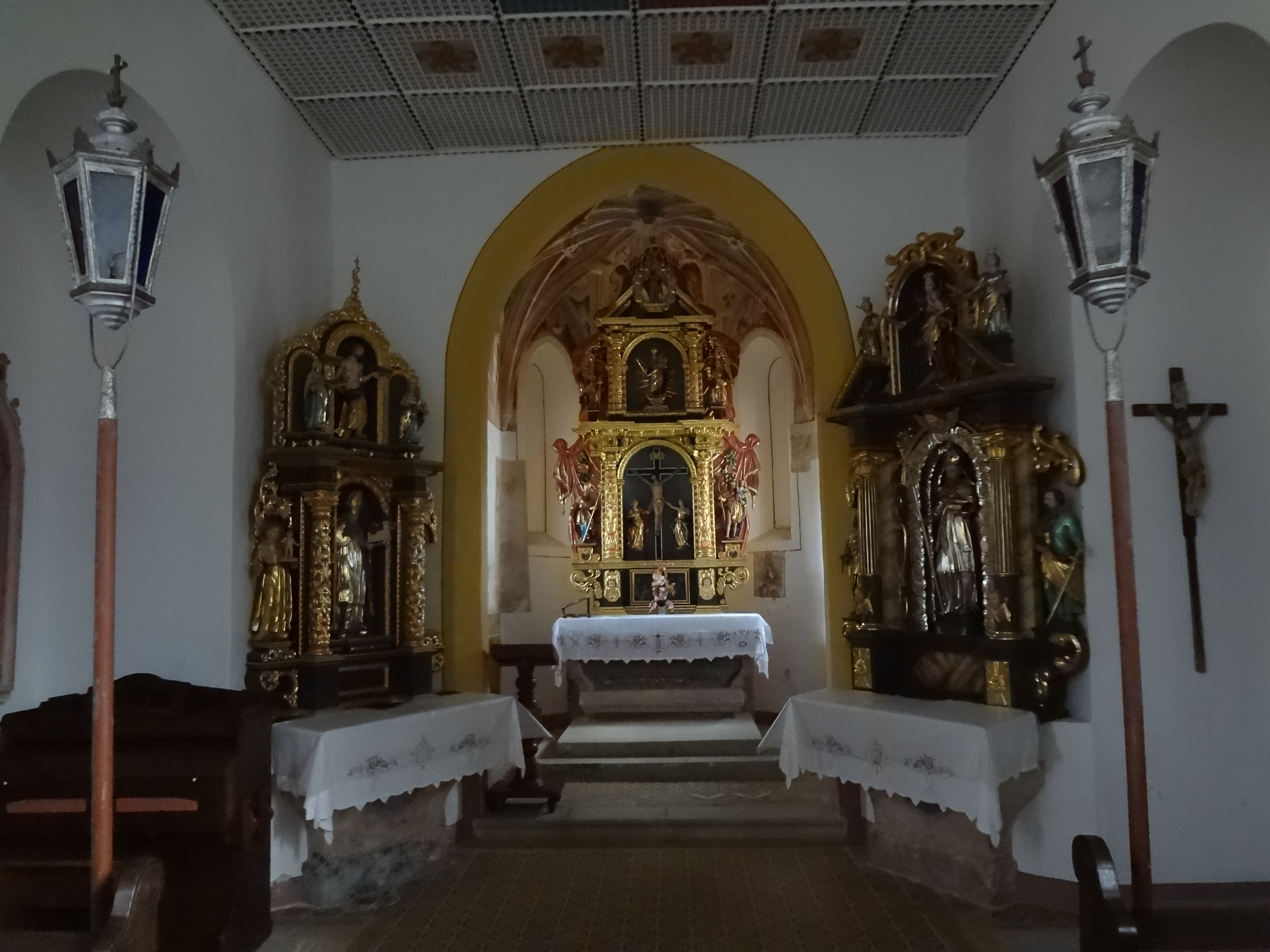
Main altar

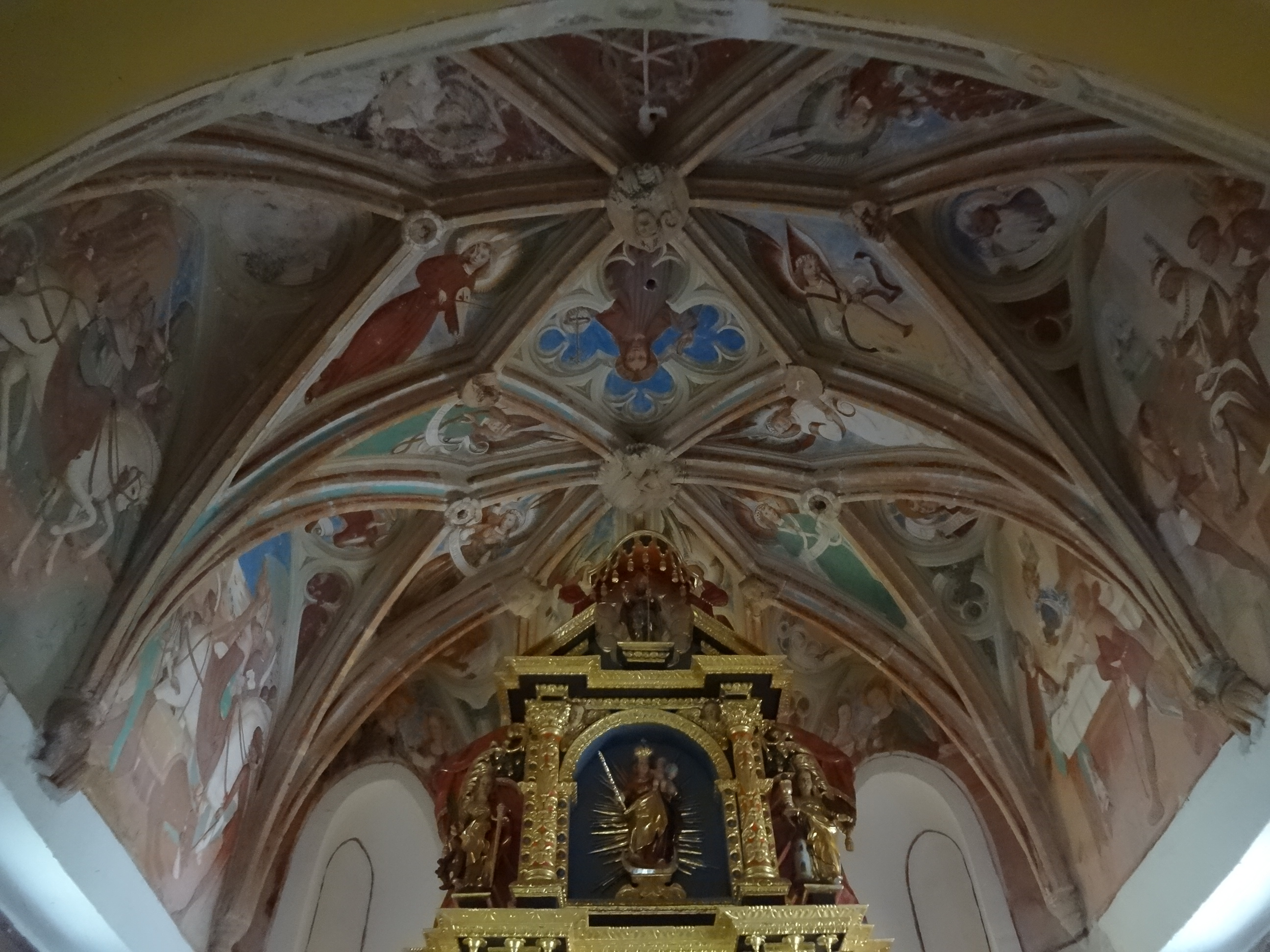
Gothic frescos

Holy Cross Church

The local church on a hill above the settlement is dedicated to the Holy Cross and was built around 1500. It contains many well-preserved frescos from 1502 that depict the legends of Saint Ulrich, to whom the church was dedicated until 1867, and of Saint Corbinian. Some of the frescos in the nave, dating to around 1530, are believed to be by Jernej of Loka. The hill with the church is a popular destination for short outings by locals.
