= Zgornji Otok =

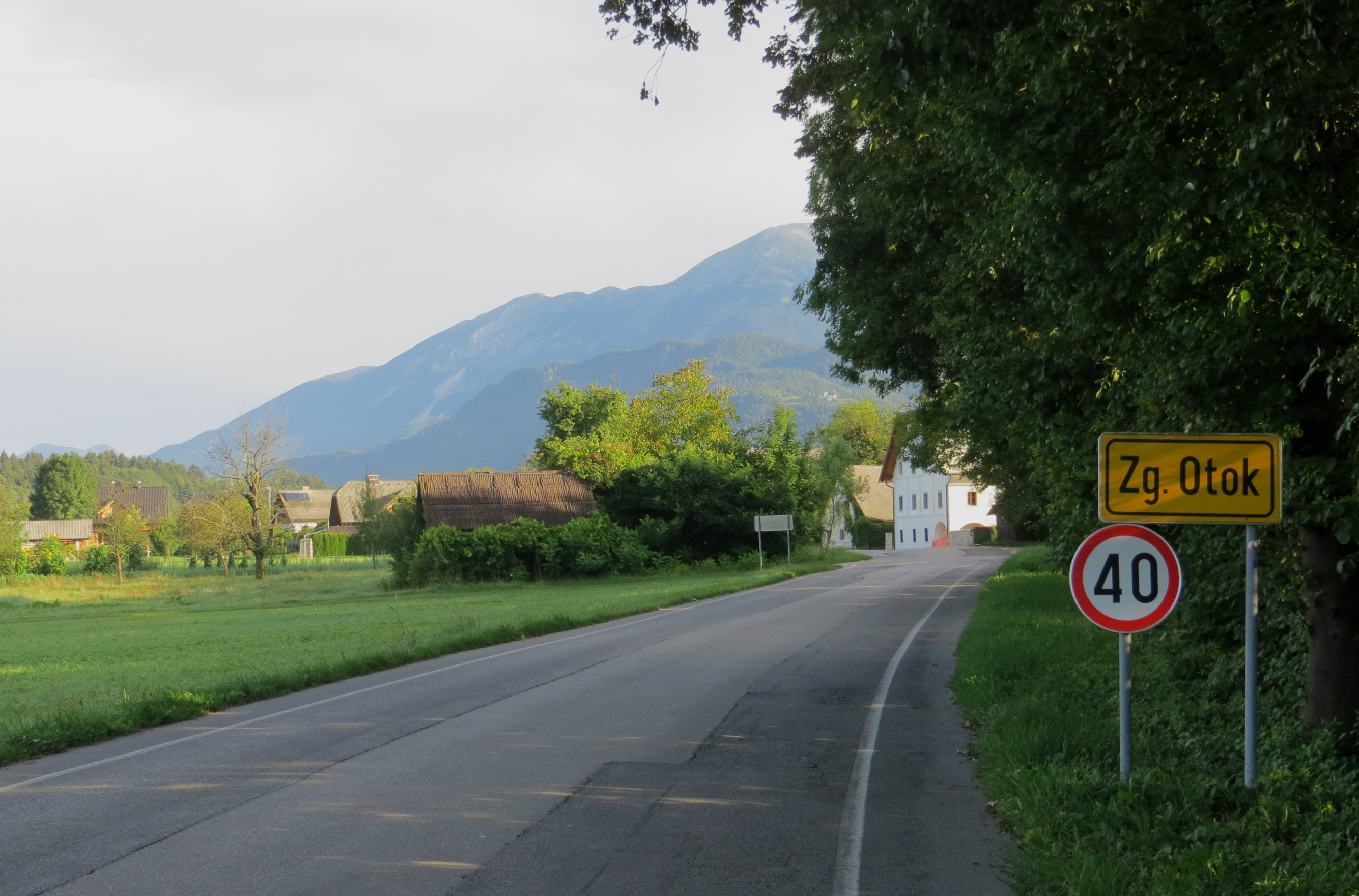

- Location in Slovenia
- Coordinates: 46°21′0.11″N 14°12′15.08″E
- Country: Slovenia
- Region: Upper Carniola
- Statistical region: Upper Carniola
- Municipality: Radovljica
- Elevation: 502.5 m (1,649 ft)

Population (2002)
  - Total: 55

Zgornji Otok (pronounced [ˈzɡoːɾnji ˈɔːtɔk], German: Oberotok) is a settlement in the Municipality of Radovljica in the Upper Carniola region of Slovenia.

== Geography ==
Zgornji Otok lies along the road from Zapuže to Mošnje where the foothills of the Kamnik–Savinja Alps meet the Radovljica Basin. An intermittent stream runs through the village; during heavy rains it rises quickly and becomes a tributary of Dobruša Creek. The soil is very sandy.

== Name ==
The name Zgornji Otok (literally, 'upper Otok') is paired with that of neighboring Spodnji Otok (literally, 'lower Otok'), which stands about 8 meters (26 ft) lower in elevation. Together with Spodnji Otok, both villages were attested with the German name Werd in 1326, which, like Slovene Otok, means 'island'. Like settlements with the semantically corresponding name Verd, the name refers not only to an island, but also to an elevated location next to a marsh or other wetland.

== Mass grave ==
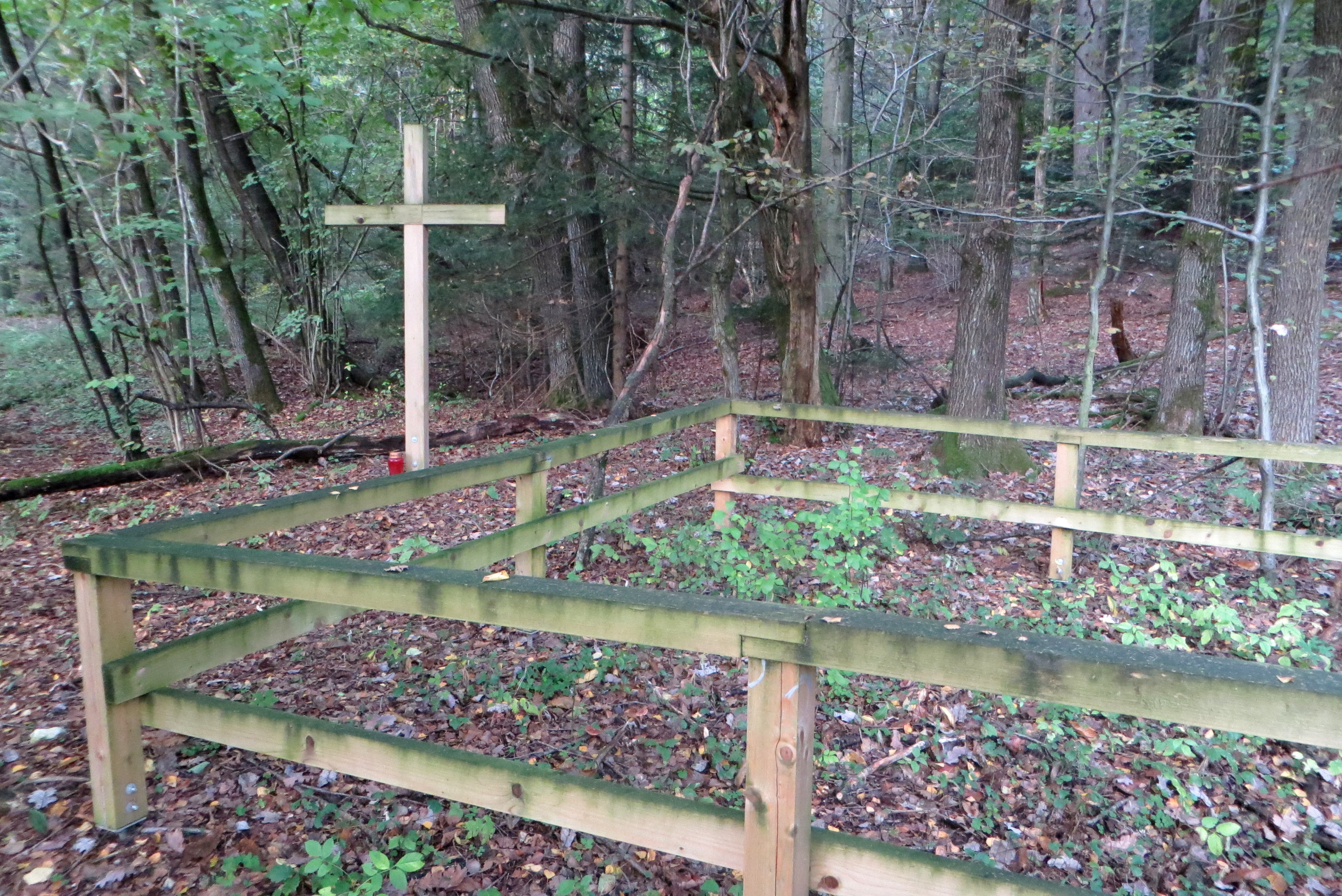
Zgornji Otok Mass Grave

Zgornji Otok is the site of a mass grave from the end of the Second World War. The Zgornji Otok Mass Grave (Slovene: Grobišče Zgornji Otok) is located on sunken ground in a meadow west of the settlement, a few meters east of the edge of the woods, at a site called Pod Koncami. It contains the remains of 14 Croatian soldiers killed on May 6, 1945.

== Notable people ==
Notable people that were born or lived in Zgornji Otok include:

- Ivan Resman (1848–1905), poet
