= Godešič =

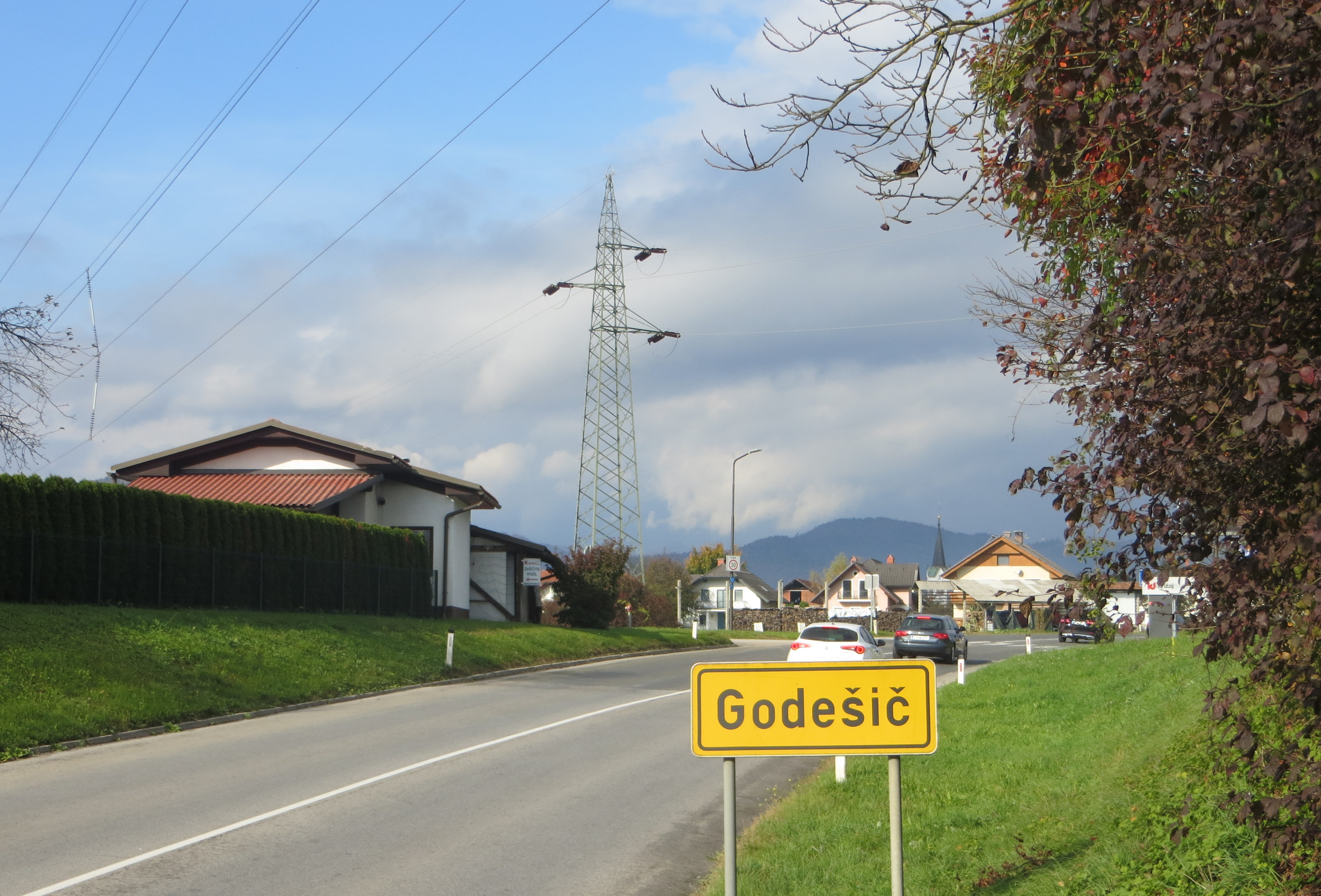

- Location in Slovenia
- Coordinates: 46°9′44.99″N 14°21′27.41″E
- Country: Slovenia
- Traditional region: Upper Carniola
- Statistical region: Upper Carniola
- Municipality: Škofja Loka

Area
  - Total: 5.06 km^{2} (1.95 sq mi)
- Elevation: 350.3 m (1,149 ft)

Population (2023)
  - Total: 700

Godešič (pronounced [ˈɡoːdɛʃitʃ]; in older sources also Godešiče, German: Godeschitz) is a village on the right bank of the Sora River in the Municipality of Škofja Loka in the Upper Carniola region of Slovenia.

== Name ==
Godešič was attested in written sources in 1022–1023 as Niusazinhun, and later as Nivsaze (1160), Niuznsaezze (1214), and Nivsaez (1291). The modern Slovene name—originally plural, *Godešiči—is a patronymic derived from the hypocorism *Godešь, probably referring to an early settler of the village.

== Church ==
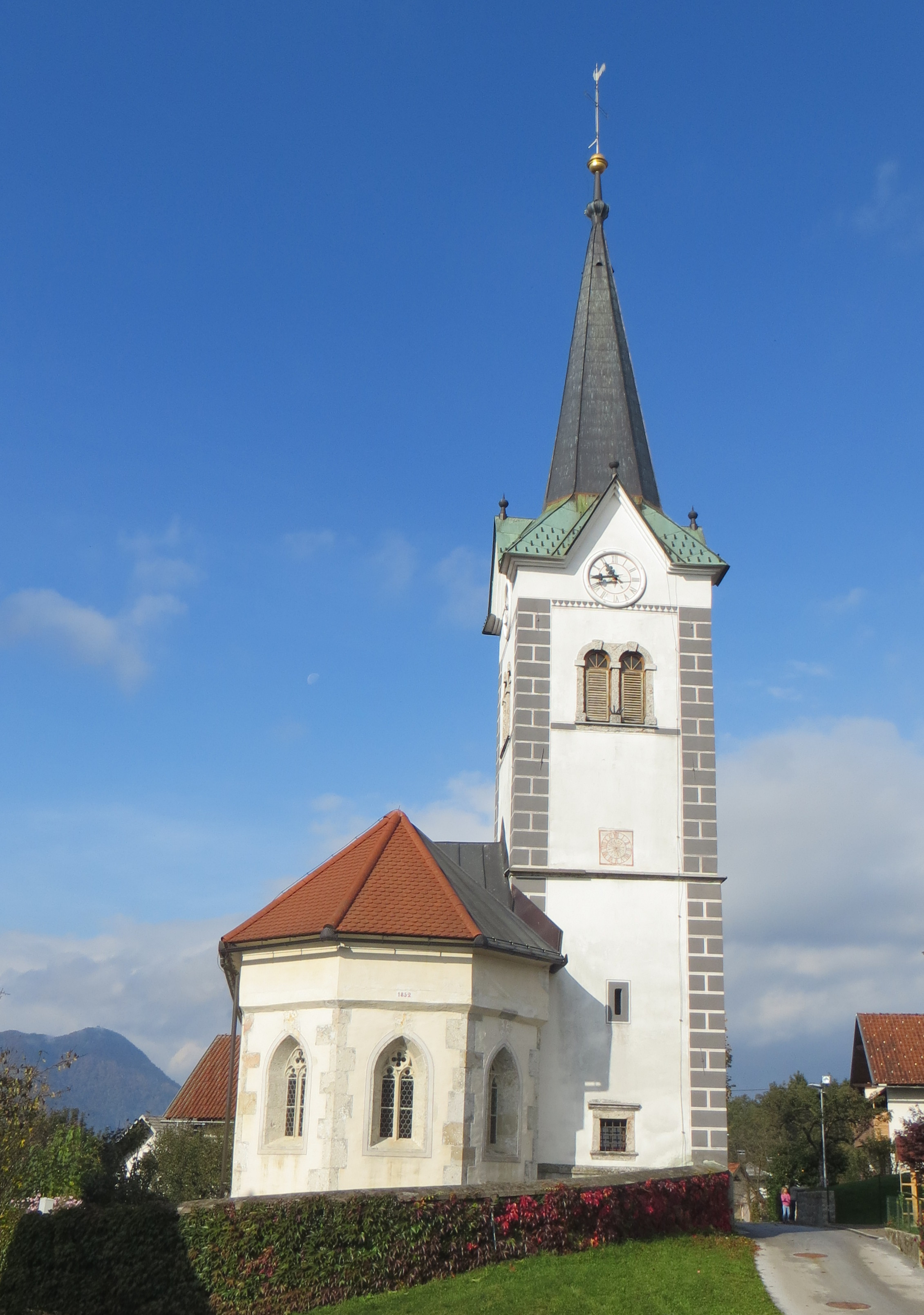
Saint Nicholas's Church

The local church is dedicated to Saint Nicholas and is Romanesque in its origins based on archaeological evidence of an apse found when the floor of the current church was being renovated. At the end of the 14th century a Gothic church was built on the site; a painted east facade, dated to c. 1400, survives. The church was expanded in 1852. Inside, 16th-century frescos by Jernej of Loka survive in the sanctuary.

=== Glagolitic inscriptions ===
There is a Glagolitic inscription with the date 1400 written in mixed Latin script and Glagolitic at Saint Nicholas's church. It is one of the more recent Glagolitic inscriptions to be discovered and also one of the northernmost.

Another Glagolitic inscription at the church is to the right of the door, engraved by Petar of Buže.

ⰕⰑⰒⰋⰔⰀ ⰒⰅⰕⰀⰓⰬ ⰋⰈⰁⰖⰆⰀ
ⰒⰮⰑⰈⰋ ⰮⰖ ⰁⰑⰃⰬ Ⱍ Ⱇ Ⰰ
This was written by Petar of Buže
May God help him, 1501

In the inscription, ⰕⰑ (TO) is written as a ligature. It was first published by Branko Fučić in 1982.

== Notable people ==
Notable people that were born or lived in Godešič include:

- Anton Hafner (1887–1918), soldier and leader of the Judenburg Rebellion
- Anja Čarman (born 1985), Slovene swimmer, multiple European swimming championships medalist
