= Zminec =

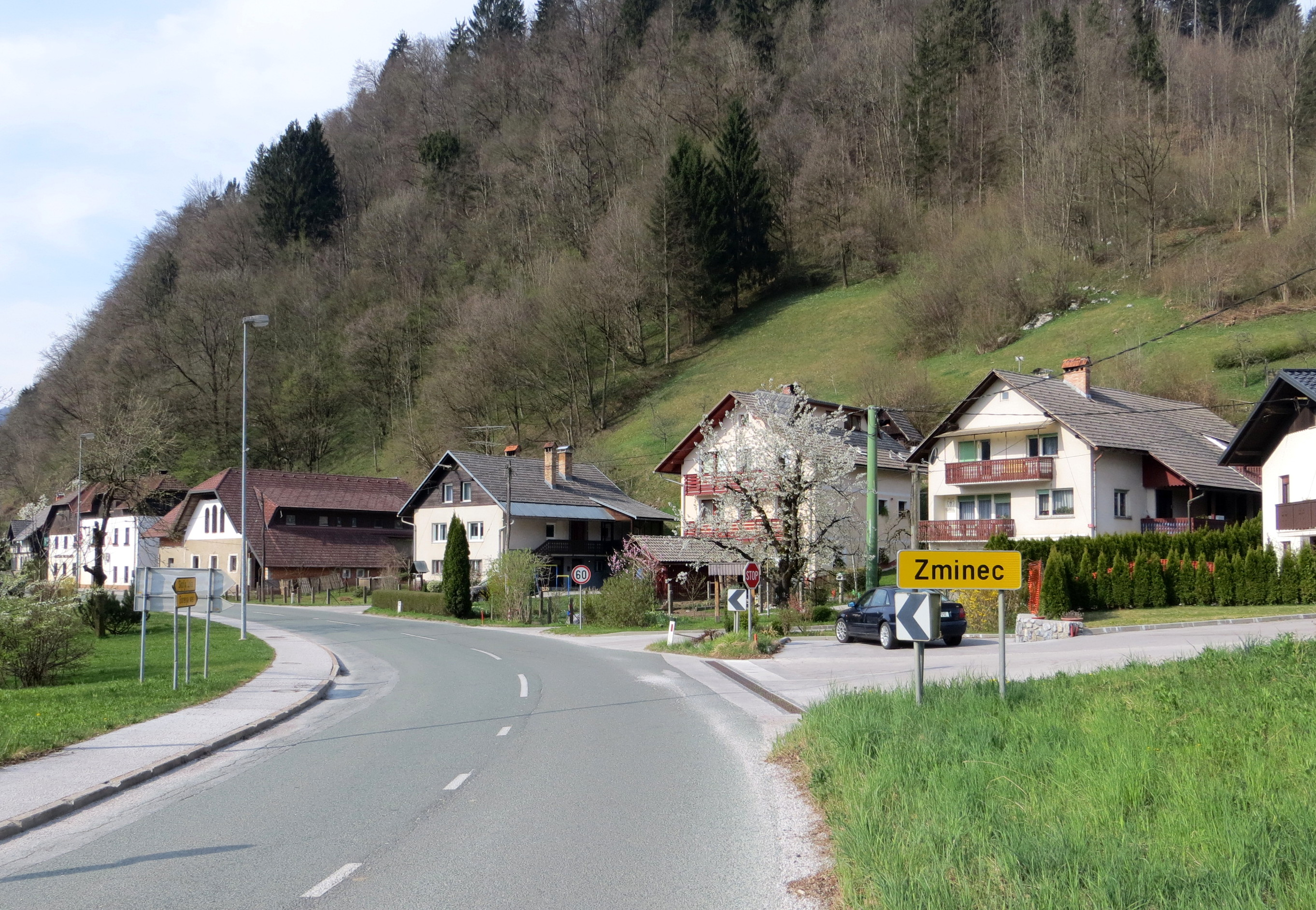

- Location in Slovenia
- Coordinates: 46°8′41.93″N 14°17′5.08″E
- Country: Slovenia
- Traditional region: Upper Carniola
- Statistical region: Upper Carniola
- Municipality: Škofja Loka

Area
  - Total: 4.23 km^{2} (1.63 sq mi)
- Elevation: 355.4 m (1,166 ft)

Population (2016)
  - Total: 517

Zminec (pronounced [ˈzmiːnəts]; German: Sminz) is a village on the left bank of the Poljanščica River in the Municipality of Škofja Loka in the Upper Carniola region of Slovenia.

== Name ==
Zminec was attested in historical sources as Trachen in 1291 and 1392, Traken in 1421, and Smintzi in 1501. The Slovene name comes from the adjective *zmьjьnъ 'snake's, dragon's' (from the common noun *zmьjь 'snake, dragon'), as confirmed by the medieval attestations containing Middle High German trachen 'dragon'. The reason for the name is unknown, but it may be connected to the Slovene plant name zminec 'snakeshead', also derived from *zmьjь 'snake, dragon'.
