= St. Oswald, Lower Austria =

Sankt Oswald
- Municipality
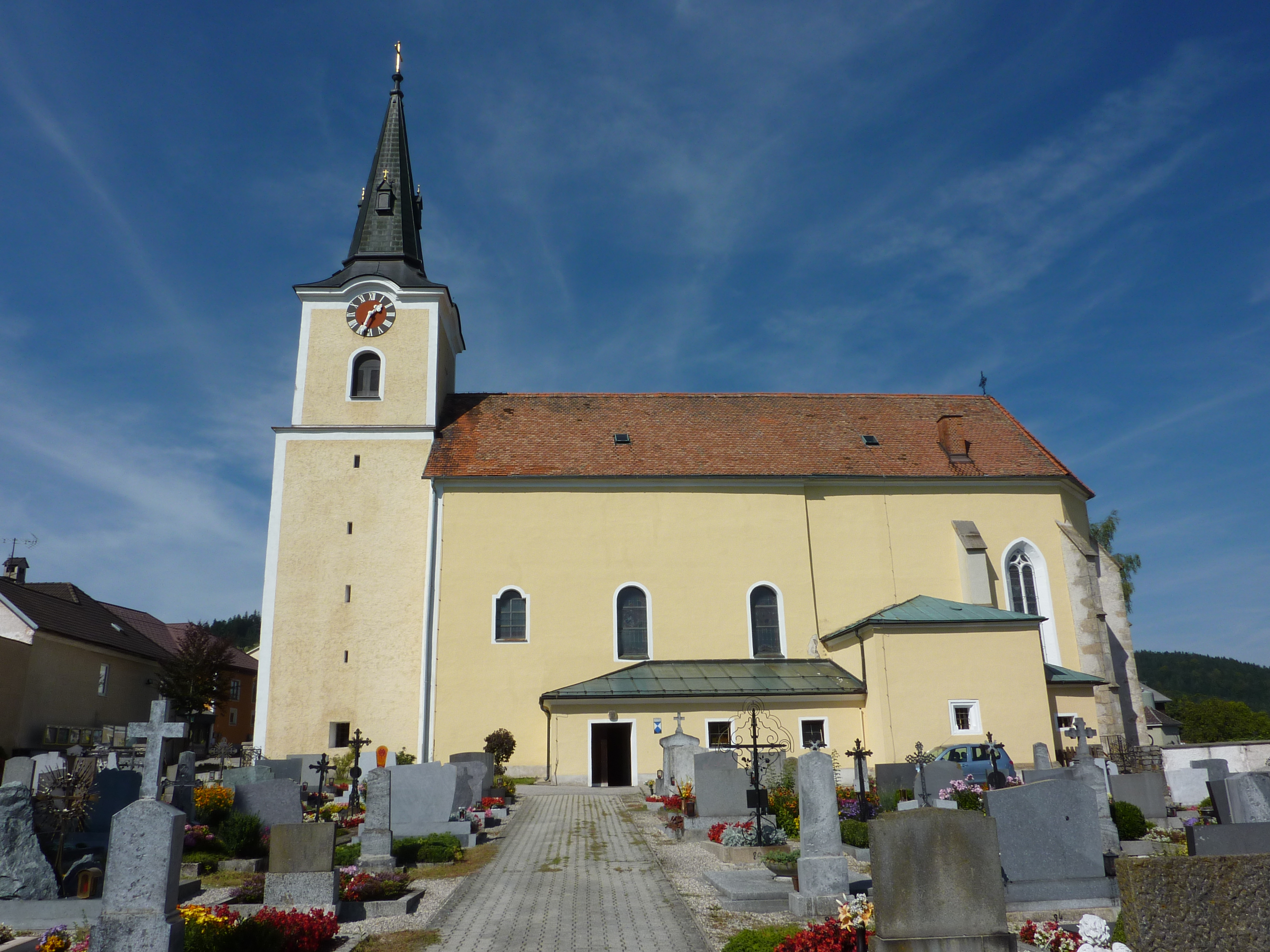
- Sankt Oswald parish church

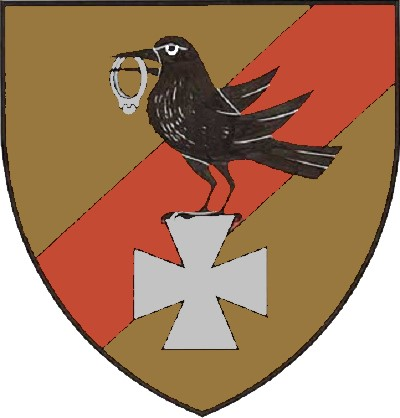
- Coat of arms

- Location within Austria
- Coordinates: 48°16′N 15°2′E
- Country: Austria
- State: Lower Austria
- District: Melk

Government
  - Mayor: Ignaz Leonhartsberger

Area
  - Total: 32.15 km^{2} (12.41 sq mi)
- Elevation: 658 m (2,159 ft)

Population (2016-01-01)
  - Total: 1,124
  - Density: 34.96/km^{2} (90.55/sq mi)
- Time zone: UTC+1 (CET)
  - Summer (DST): UTC+2 (CEST)
- Postal code: 3684
- Area code: 07415
- Website: www.stoswald.com

Sankt Oswald is a town located in the district of Melk within the Austrian state of Lower Austria.

== Population ==
Historical population
Year	Pop.	±%
1971	1,158	—
1981	1,165	+0.6%
1991	1,116	−4.2%
2001	1,134	+1.6%
