= Sveti Ožbolt =

Sveti Ožbolt Ožbolt nad Zmincem (1955–1997)
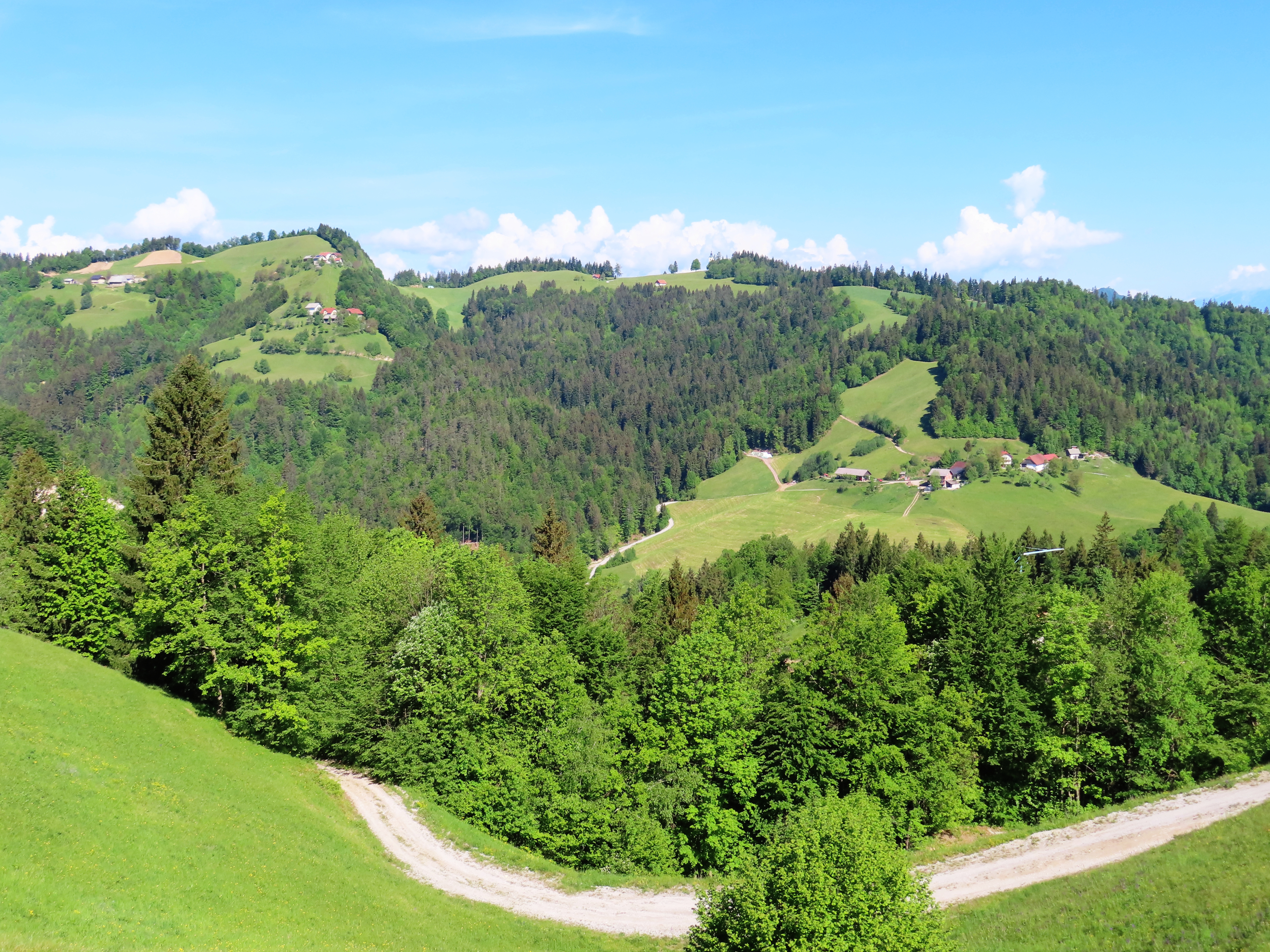

- Location in Slovenia
- Coordinates: 46°6′53.71″N 14°17′5.31″E
- Country: Slovenia
- Traditional region: Upper Carniola
- Statistical region: Upper Carniola
- Municipality: Škofja Loka

Area
  - Total: 7.72 km^{2} (2.98 sq mi)
- Elevation: 847.3 m (2,780 ft)

Population (2002)
  - Total: 78

Sveti Ožbolt (pronounced [ˈsʋeːti ˈoːʒbɔlt]; German: Sankt Oswald) is a settlement in the Municipality of Škofja Loka in the Upper Carniola region of Slovenia.

== Name ==
The name of the settlement was changed from Sveti Ožbolt (literally, 'Saint Oswald') to Ožbolt nad Zmincem (literally, 'Oswald above Zminec') in 1955. The name was changed on the basis of the 1948 Law on Names of Settlements and Designations of Squares, Streets, and Buildings as part of efforts by Slovenia's postwar communist government to remove religious elements from toponyms. The name Sveti Ožbolt was restored in 1997. In the past the German name was Sankt Oswald.

== Church ==
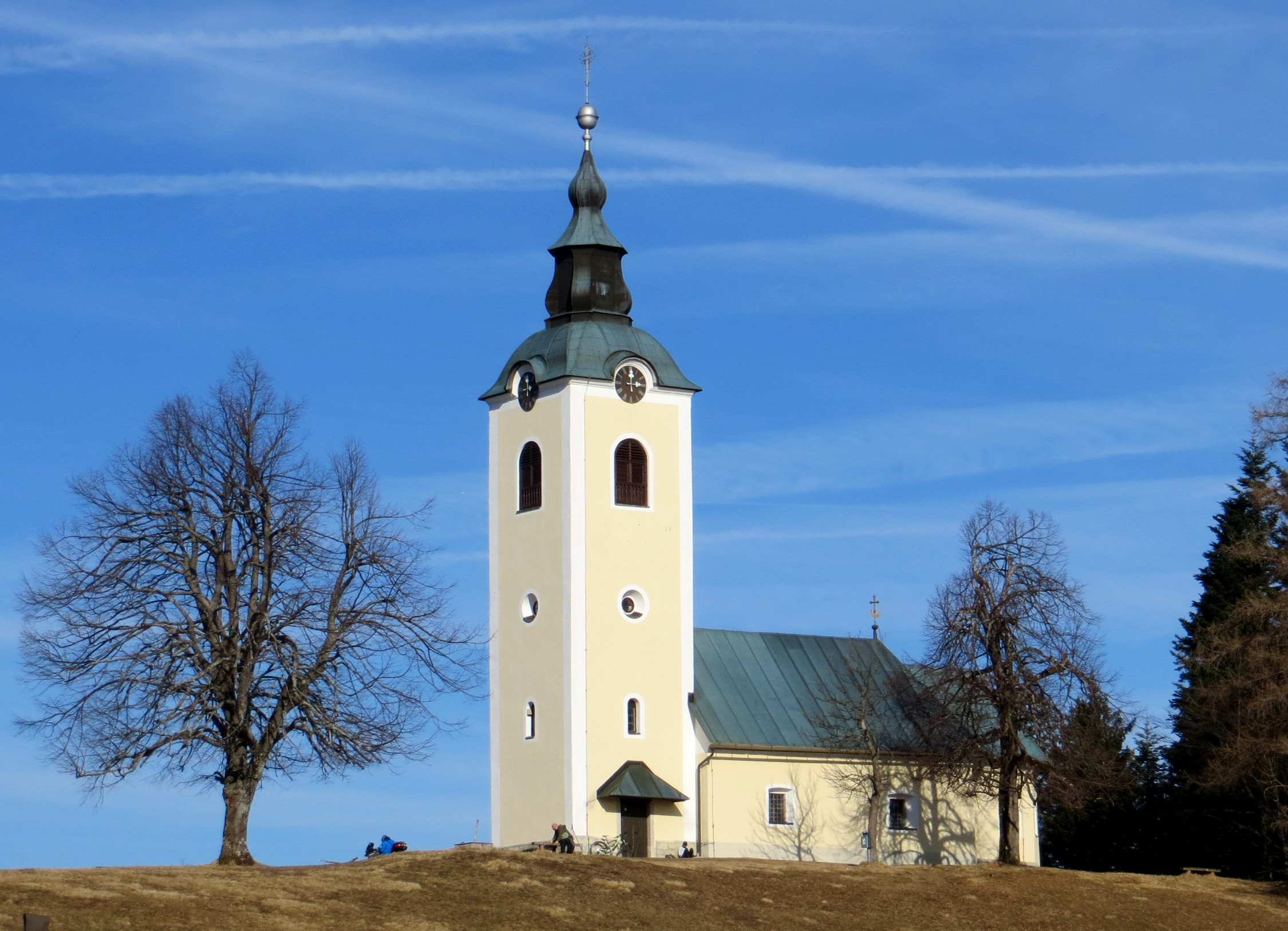
Saint Oswald's Church

The local church, built on a hill above the settlement, is dedicated to Saint Oswald and is Late Gothic with the date 1527 in its vaulted sanctuary. The nave dates to 1644 and originally had a flat ceiling but was vaulted in 1849. Frescos on the arch leading to the sanctuary were painted by Jernej of Loka in 1534.

== Gallery ==
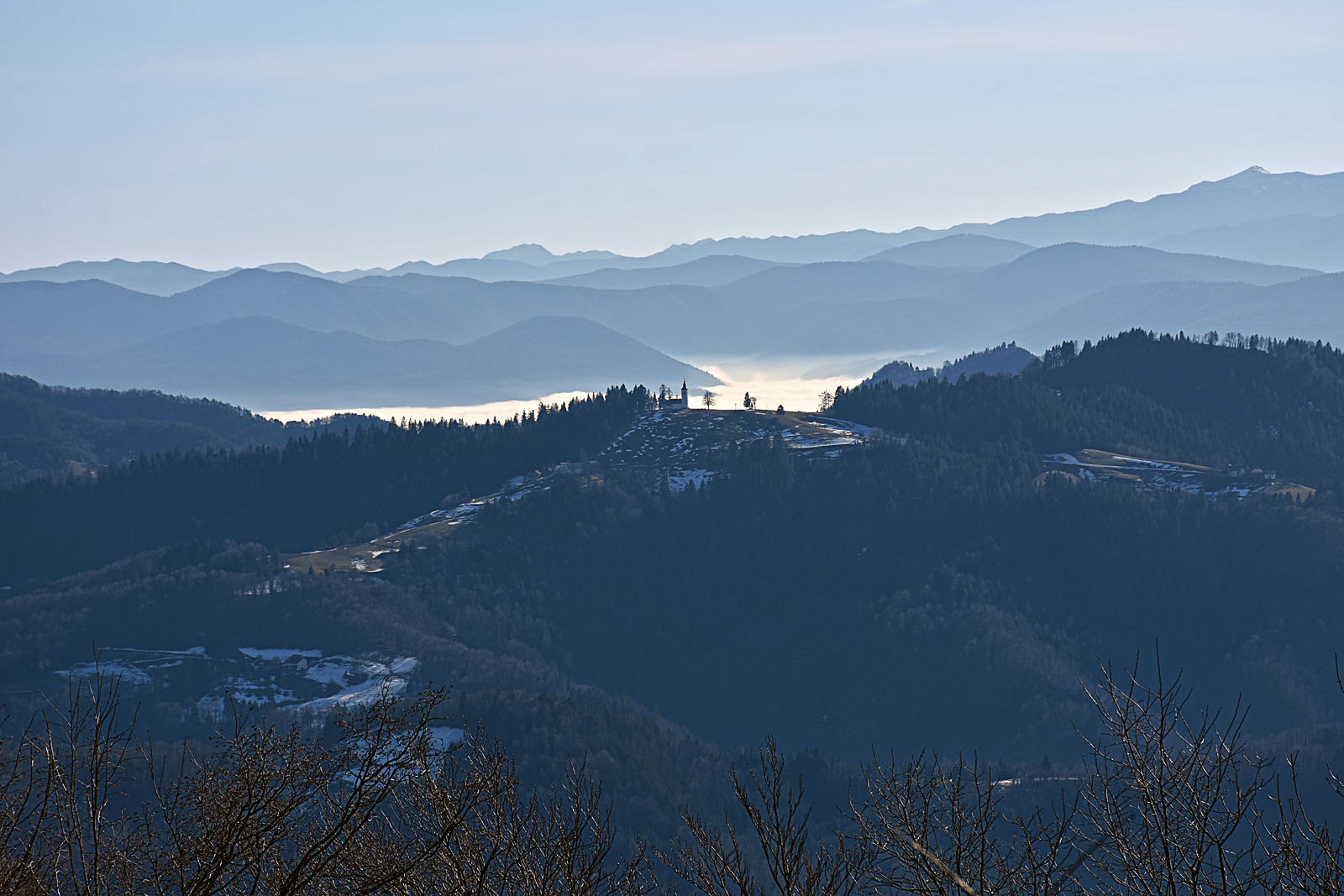
Sveti Ožbolt from the north
