= Bukov Vrh nad Visokim =

Bukov Vrh nad Visokim Bukov Vrh (until 1997)
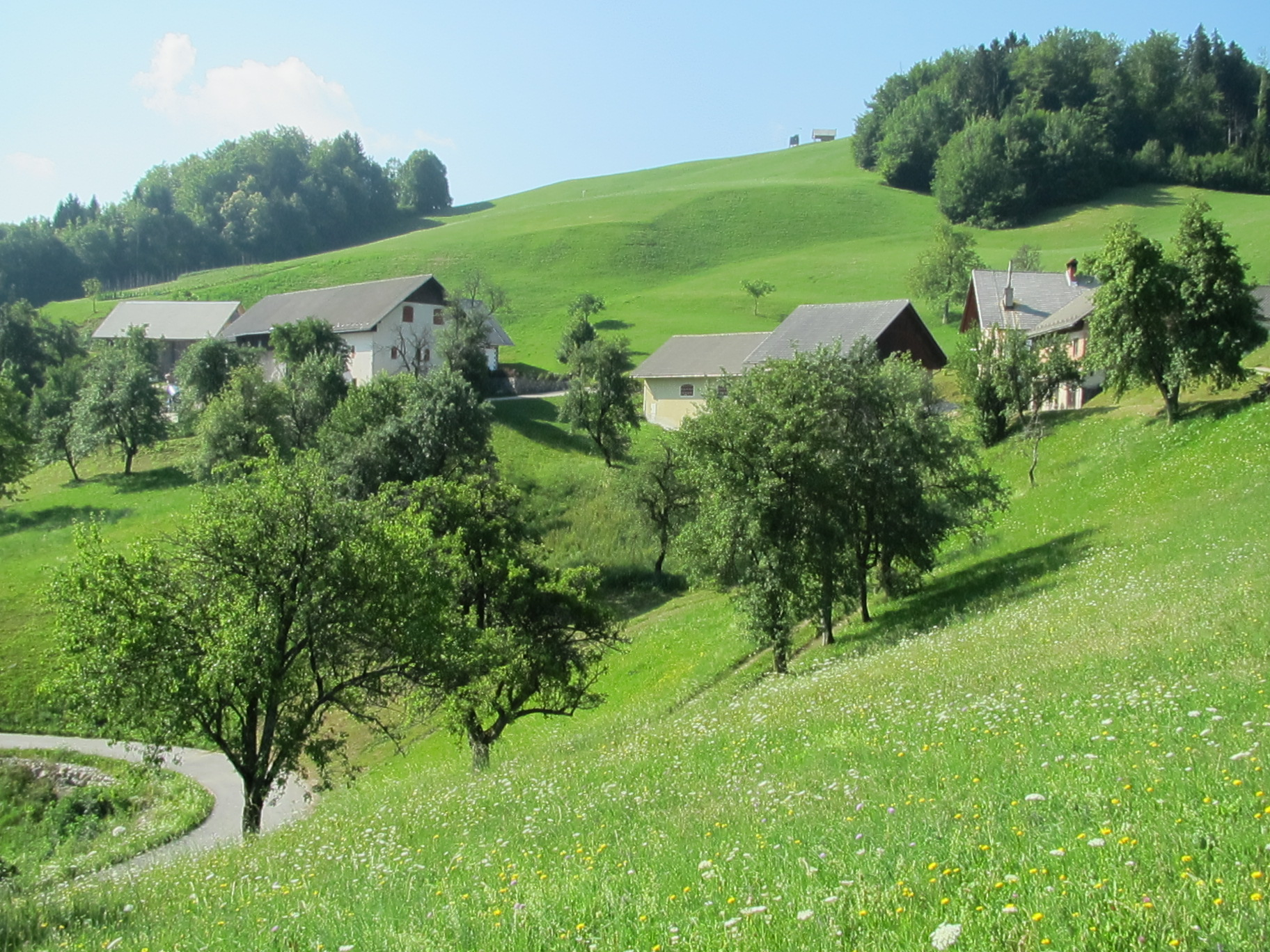

- Location in Slovenia
- Coordinates: 46°6′39.7″N 14°13′33.59″E
- Country: Slovenia
- Traditional region: Upper Carniola
- Statistical region: Upper Carniola
- Municipality: Škofja Loka

Area
  - Total: 2.74 km^{2} (1.06 sq mi)
- Elevation: 740.6 m (2,430 ft)

Population (2002)
  - Total: 42

Bukov Vrh nad Visokim (pronounced [ˈbuːkɔu̯ ˈʋəɾx nad ʋiˈsɔːkɔm]) is a settlement above Visoko pri Poljanah in the Municipality of Škofja Loka in the Upper Carniola region of Slovenia.

== Geography ==
Bukov Vrh nad Visokim is a dispersed settlement in the northwestern part of the Polhov Gradec Hills. It consists of the isolated Dolinec, Golar, Kuzovec, Skobelj, and Švint farms, as well as the hamlet of Podskalar (with the Boštar, Brnovi, and Šuštar farms). The highest elevation in the settlement is Pasja ravan (literally, 'dog plateau', elevation 1,020 meters or 3,350 feet). Sovpat Creek, a tributary of the Poljane Sora River, borders the settlement to the northeast and is fed by several small creeks in the settlement. The name Sovpat is the Poljane dialect form of the word sopot 'stream with waterfalls'.

== Name ==
Bukov Vrh nad Visokim is one of several neighboring villages whose names end with vrh 'peak' (cf. Črni Vrh, Kovski Vrh, Srednji Vrh, and Valterski Vrh). The name Bukov Vrh nad Visokim literally means 'beech peak above Visoko'. Like similar names (e.g., Bukovo, Bukovica, Bukovec, etc.), it is derived from the Slovene adjective bukov, from the common noun bukev 'beech', referring to the local vegetation.

== History ==
The area was settled between the 12th and early 14th centuries by ethnic Slovenians from Carinthia. During the Second World War there was an engagement between German forces and members of the Partisans' Cankar Brigade at the Skobelj farm, where there is a small memorial. In the 1970s, the Yugoslav People's Army reduced the elevation of Pasja ravan by about 10 meters (33 ft) in order to install bunkers and launching sites for S-125 Neva antiaircraft missiles.

Bukov Vrh nad Visokim was established as a separate settlement in 1997, when it was split off from Bukov Vrh.
