= Valterski Vrh =

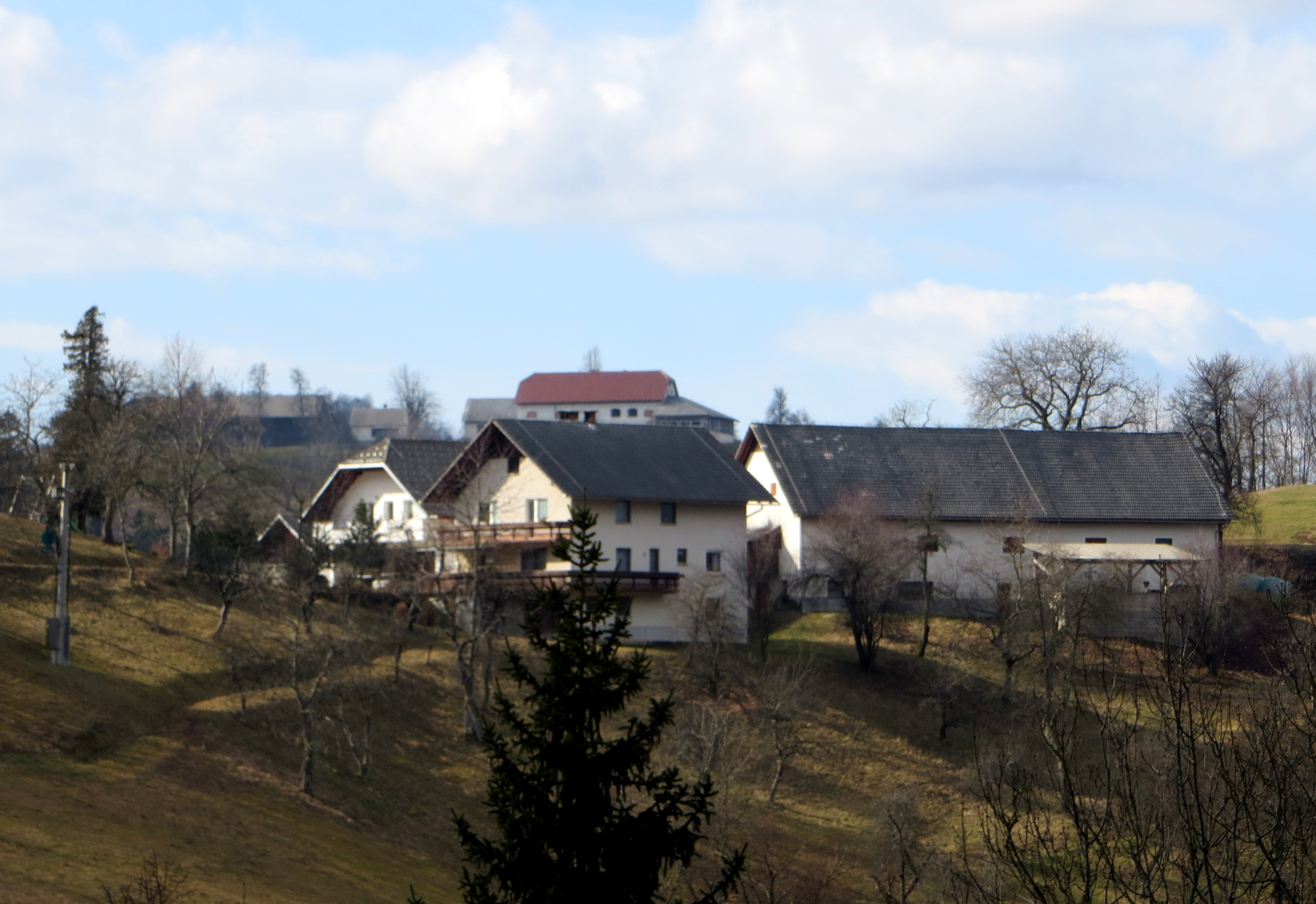

- Location in Slovenia
- Coordinates: 46°6′47.42″N 14°14′13.54″E
- Country: Slovenia
- Traditional region: Upper Carniola
- Statistical region: Upper Carniola
- Municipality: Škofja Loka

Area
  - Total: 2.53 km^{2} (0.98 sq mi)
- Elevation: 677.3 m (2,222 ft)

Population (2002)
  - Total: 5

Valterski Vrh (pronounced [ˈʋaːltɛɾski ˈʋəɾx]) is a small settlement in the Municipality of Škofja Loka in the Upper Carniola region of Slovenia.

== Geography ==
Valterski Vrh stands next to Golec Hill (674 meters or 2,211 feet) on a ridge between the valleys of Sovpat (or Sopot) Creek to the west and Hill Creek (Hribovska grapa) to the east. The core of the settlement, with the church, is known as V hribih 'in the hills'. Small farms belonging to the village lie on the slope and in the valley of Sovpat Creek. Polhovec Hill (948 meters or 3,110 feet) rises to the east, and unpaved roads connect the village to Log nad Škofjo Loko and Staniše.

== Name ==
Valterski Vrh is one of several neighboring villages whose names end with vrh 'peak' (cf. Bukov Vrh, Črni Vrh, Kovski Vrh, and Srednji Vrh). Valterski Vrh is also known as Sveta Filip in Jakob v Hribih 'Saints Phillip and James in the Hills', after the patrons of the village church. The name of the village was recorded as Chribu around 1490, Walterskivrch in 1500, Balterskhiwurch in 1560, and Waltersskhiuorch in 1584. In the local dialect, the name has been reworked (via folk etymology) into Bajtarski Vrh (literally, 'tenant farmer's peak'). The name Valterski Vrh is equivalent to the metathesized name Lavtarski Vrh, a village 11.5 kilometers (7.1 mi) to the north-northeast.

== History ==
During the Second World War, there was a Partisan base at Polhovec Hill in the summer of 1941. Engagements took place between the Partisans and German forces near the village in December 1941. On 29 December 1941, German forces shot the owner and farmhand at the Jakobec (a.k.a. Jekopec) farm for storing munitions for the Partisans, and then burned the farm the following day.

== Church ==
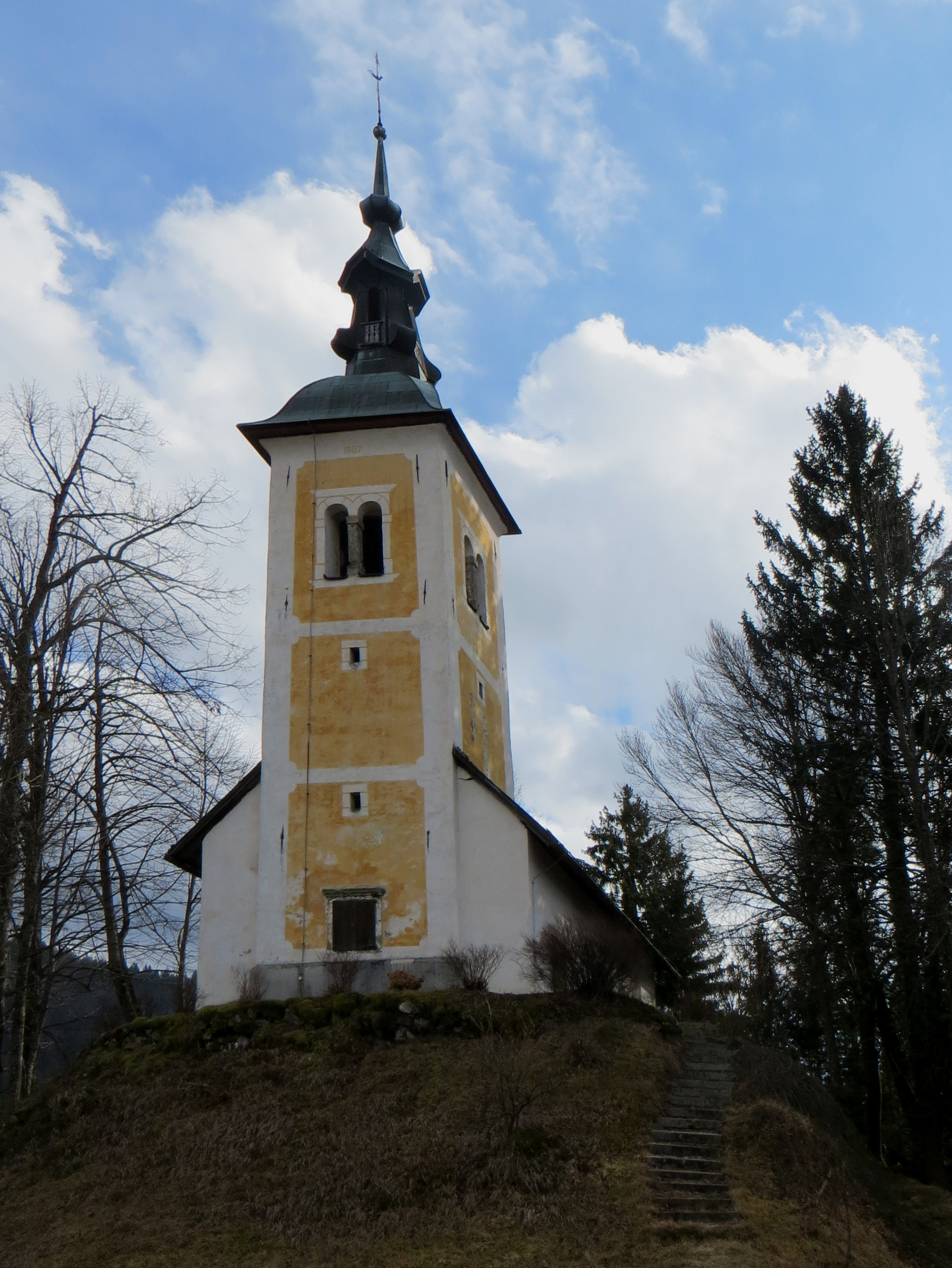
Saints Philip and James Church

The church in the settlement is dedicated to Saints Phillip and James. It is Late Gothic with a star vaulted sanctuary. Frescos in the sanctuary are by Jernej of Loka and date to soon after 1534. There is a fresco of Saint Christopher on the south external wall that was restored in 2004. The main altar dates to 1668 and the side altars are from 1648 and 1838.
