= Kovski Vrh =

- Location in Slovenia
- Coordinates: 46°7′2.32″N 14°13′24.42″E
- Country: Slovenia
- Traditional region: Upper Carniola
- Statistical region: Upper Carniola
- Municipality: Škofja Loka

Area
  - Total: 1.58 km^{2} (0.61 sq mi)
- Elevation: 689.7 m (2,263 ft)

Population (2002)
  - Total: 28

Kovski Vrh (pronounced [ˈkoːu̯ski ˈʋəɾx], in older sources also Kovški V(e)rh; German: Kouskiwerch) is a small settlement above Visoko in the Municipality of Škofja Loka in the Upper Carniola region of Slovenia.

== Name ==
A sign for Kovski Vrh

Kovski Vrh is one of several neighboring villages whose names end with vrh 'peak' (cf. Bukov Vrh, Črni Vrh, Srednji Vrh, and Valterski Vrh). The modifier kovski derives from the common noun kolk, dialect kovk 'hill'; the name therefore means 'hill peak'.
