= Srednji Vrh =

Srednji Vrh may refer to:

Settlements in Slovenia:

- Srednji Vrh, Kranjska Gora
- Srednji Vrh, Dobrova–Polhov Gradec

Mountains in Slovenia:

- Srednji vrh (2134 m), a peak in the Krn Range of the Julian Alps
- Srednji vrh (1853 m), a peak in the Kamnik–Savinja Alps
- Srednji vrh (1796 m), a peak in the Karawanks
