= Big Božna =

Big Božna Creek
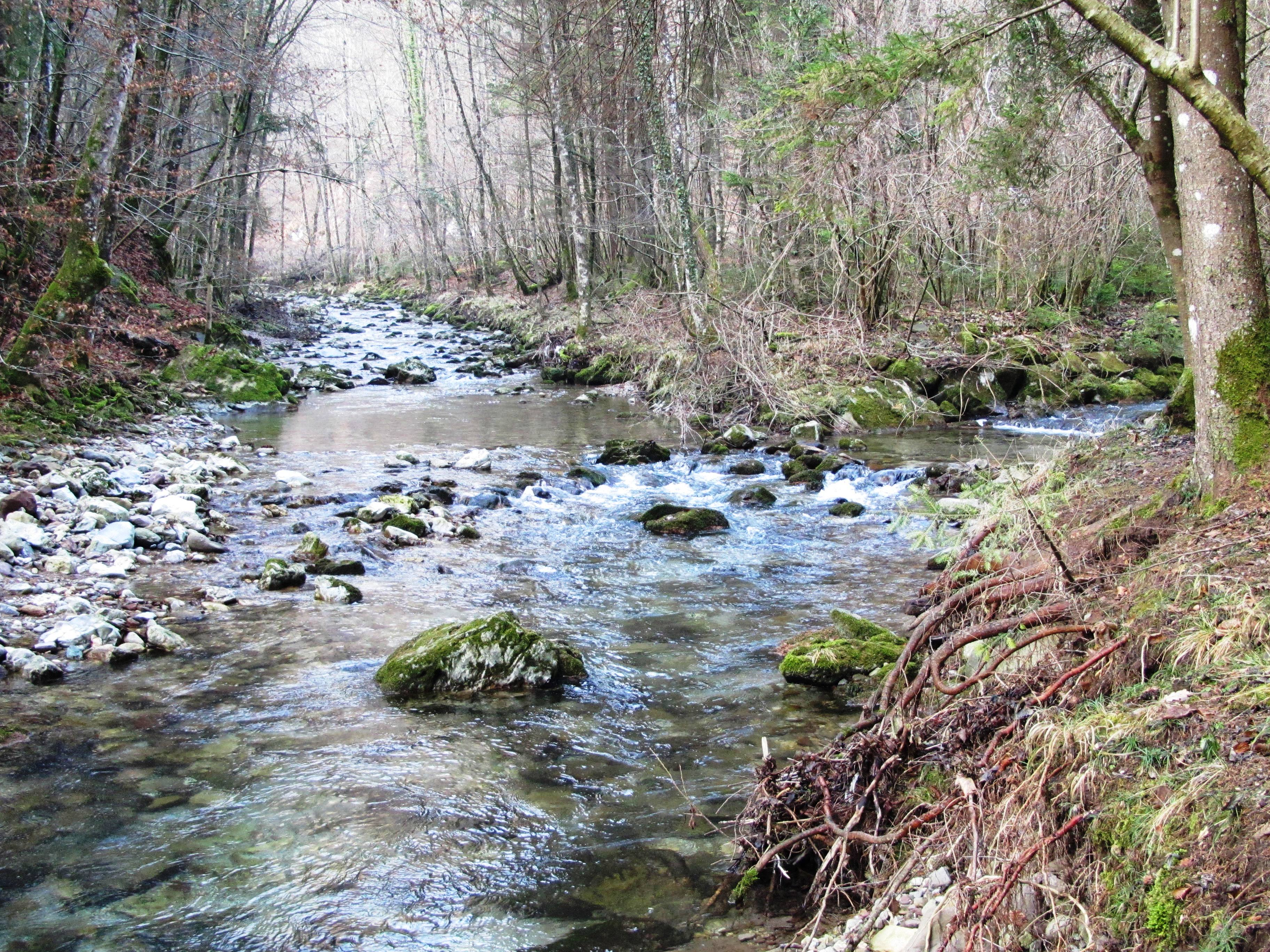
- Confluence of Big Božna Creek (left) with Little Božna Creek (right)

Location
- Country: Slovenia

Physical characteristics
- Source
  - location: Polhov Gradec Hills
  - elevation: 500 m (1,600 ft)
- Mouth
  - location: Gradaščica River in Polhov Gradec
  - coordinates: 46°3′36.91″N 14°18′52.58″E
- Length: 6.25 km (3.88 mi)

Basin features
- Progression: Gradaščica→ Ljubljanica→ Sava→ Danube→ Black Sea

Big Božna Creek (Slovene: Velika Božna) or simply the Božna, also known as Božja Creek (Božja voda), or Big Creek (Velika voda) is a stream in northwestern Slovenia. It is the left source tributary of the Gradaščica, the right one being Little Creek (Mala voda). It was recorded under the German names Salog bach or Sallog Bach (i.e., Zalog Creek) in the 18th century.

== Course ==
The source of Big Božna Creek is in the Polhov Gradec Hills west of Ljubljana, not far from Kremenik. It forms part of the watershed of the Ljubljanica River. The road from Polhov Gradec to Črni Vrh runs through the Big Božna Valley. The Big Božna is joined by Little Božna Creek (Mala Božna, recorded in German as the Botschnia or Botschnia bach in the 18th century) about 2 km north-northwest of Polhov Gradec, and then by Little Creek (Mala Voda) south of Polhov Gradec to form the Gradaščica River.
