= Jakob Savinšek =

Slovene sculptor, illustrator, and poet

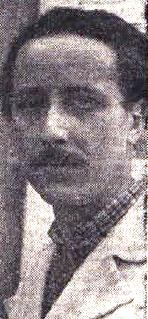
Jakob Savinšek

Jakob Savinšek (4 February 1922 – 17 August 1961) was a Slovene sculptor, illustrator, and poet.

== Life ==
Savinšek was born in the Upper Carniolan town of Kamnik, then part of the Kingdom of Serbs, Croats and Slovenes (now in Slovenia), where he spent his youth. After finishing secondary school in Ljubljana, he studied medicine at the University of Ljubljana. In the late 1930s and early 1940s, he studied drawing under the tutorship of Rihard Jakopič and sculpture under the supervision of Karla Bulovec Mrak. During World War II and the Italian annexation of Ljubljana he was imprisoned in Ljubljana Castle for collaborating with the Liberation Front of the Slovenian People. In 1942, he was later sent to the Gonars concentration camp. He was released after the Italian armistice in September 1943. A devout Roman Catholic, he decided to join the Slovenian Home Guard, an Anti-Communist militia collaborating with the Wehrmacht against the Partisan resistance. He deserted before the end of the war, thus securing himself an indulgent treatment by the new Titoist regime.

Between 1945 and 1949, he studied sculpture at the Academy of Fine Arts in Ljubljana. In the 1950s he emerged as one of the most prominent Slovenian sculptures of the younger generation, together with Drago Tršar, Boris and Zdenko Kalin. He continued his studies in Vienna, Italy, and Switzerland.

In the late 1950s, he entered in conflict with the foremost Slovenian sculptor of the time, Stojan Batič, and founded his own artistic circle, composed not only of young and talented visual artist, but of literates and theatre people such as Dino Radojević, Herbert Grün, Saša Vuga, Dušan Pirjevec and Andrej Hieng.

He died in Kirchheim, Germany, while attending a sculptors' workshop. He is buried in Žale Cemetery in Ljubljana.

== Work ==
Savinšek dedicated himself mostly to figural art, with a preference in psychologically analytic portraits and female nudes. At the beginning of his career, he was influenced by the tradition of Slovene expressionism (especially the works of France Kralj), but he gradually turned to his own modernist style, in which he experimented with the volume of sculpture. He also produced some graphics and illustrations.

His best-known works are the monuments to Julius Kugy in the Trenta Valley (in the Municipality of Bovec) and to Ivan Tavčar at his mansion in Visoko, and the monument War and Peace in Celje. He was also a renowned book illustrator. Among others, he illustrated books by Slavko Grum, Miran Jarc, and Alojz Gradnik. Gradnik admired Savinšek's work, and the two developed a close friendship.

Savinšek also wrote poetry throughout most of his adult life, but he never published it. His manuscripts are kept in the National and University Library of Slovenia. The first collections of his poems was published in 2003 by the literary magazine KUD Logos, edited by the philosopher Gorazd Kocijančič.

== See also ==
- List of Slovenian language poets
- List of Slovenian artists

== Sources ==
- Andrej Smrekar, "Jakob Savinšek: ob dvajsetletnici smrti" in NR Po Svetu (August 28, 1981).
- Recension of Savinšek's poetry in KUD Logos magazine
