= Bukov Vrh, Gorenja Vas–Poljane =

Bukov Vrh

- Location in Slovenia
- Coordinates: 46°6′26.85″N 14°13′0.7″E
- Country: Slovenia
- Traditional region: Upper Carniola
- Statistical region: Upper Carniola
- Municipality: Gorenja Vas–Poljane

Area
  - Total: 4.12 km^{2} (1.59 sq mi)
- Elevation: 796.1 m (2,612 ft)

Population (2020)
  - Total: 94
  - Density: 23/km^{2} (59/sq mi)

Bukov Vrh (pronounced [ˈbuːkɔu̯ ˈʋəɾx]; in older sources also Sveta Sobota, German: Sabatberg) is a dispersed settlement above Poljane nad Škofjo Loko in the Municipality of Gorenja Vas–Poljane in the Upper Carniola region of Slovenia.

== History ==
In 1997, part of the settlement was split off as a separate settlement and named Bukov Vrh nad Visokim.

== Church ==
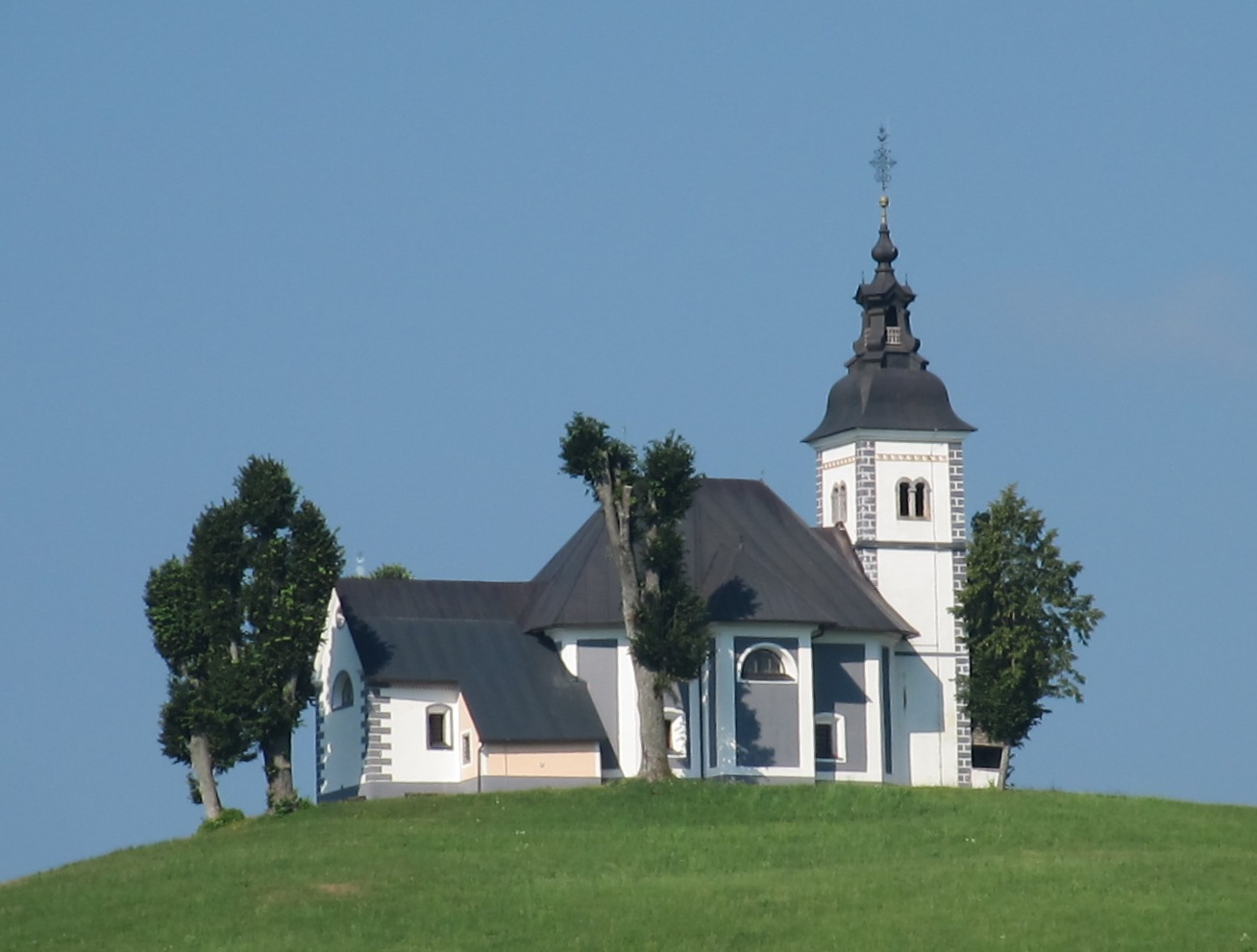
Our Lady of Sorrows Church

The local church is dedicated to Our Lady of Sorrows, locally known as Holy Sabbath Church (Slovene: sveta Sobota). It was originally a Gothic structure but was rebuilt and expanded in 1739.
