= Lovrenc Lavtižar =

Slovene missionary in Minnesota (1820–1858)

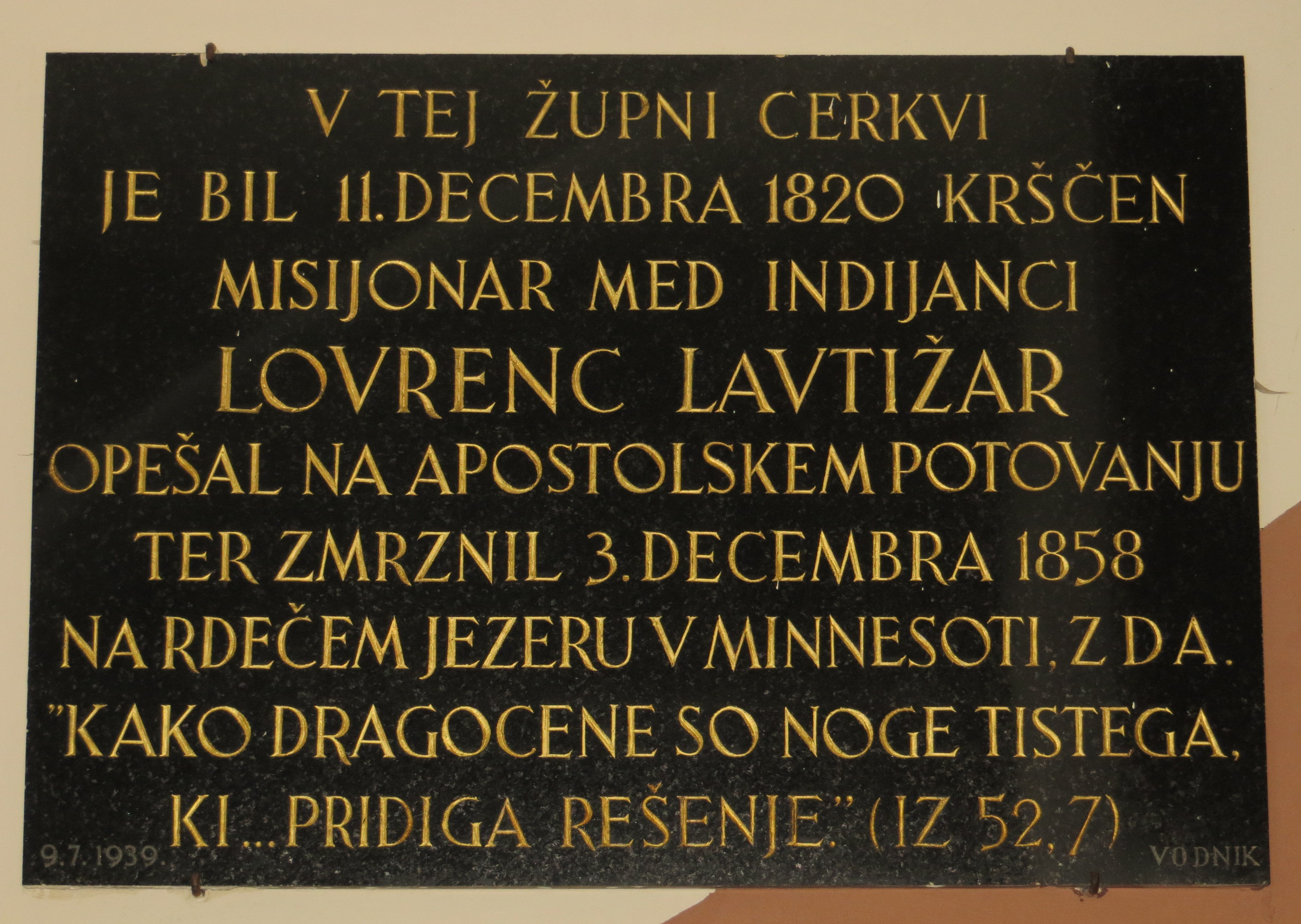
Plaque commemorating Lavtižar in Assumption Church, Kranjska Gora

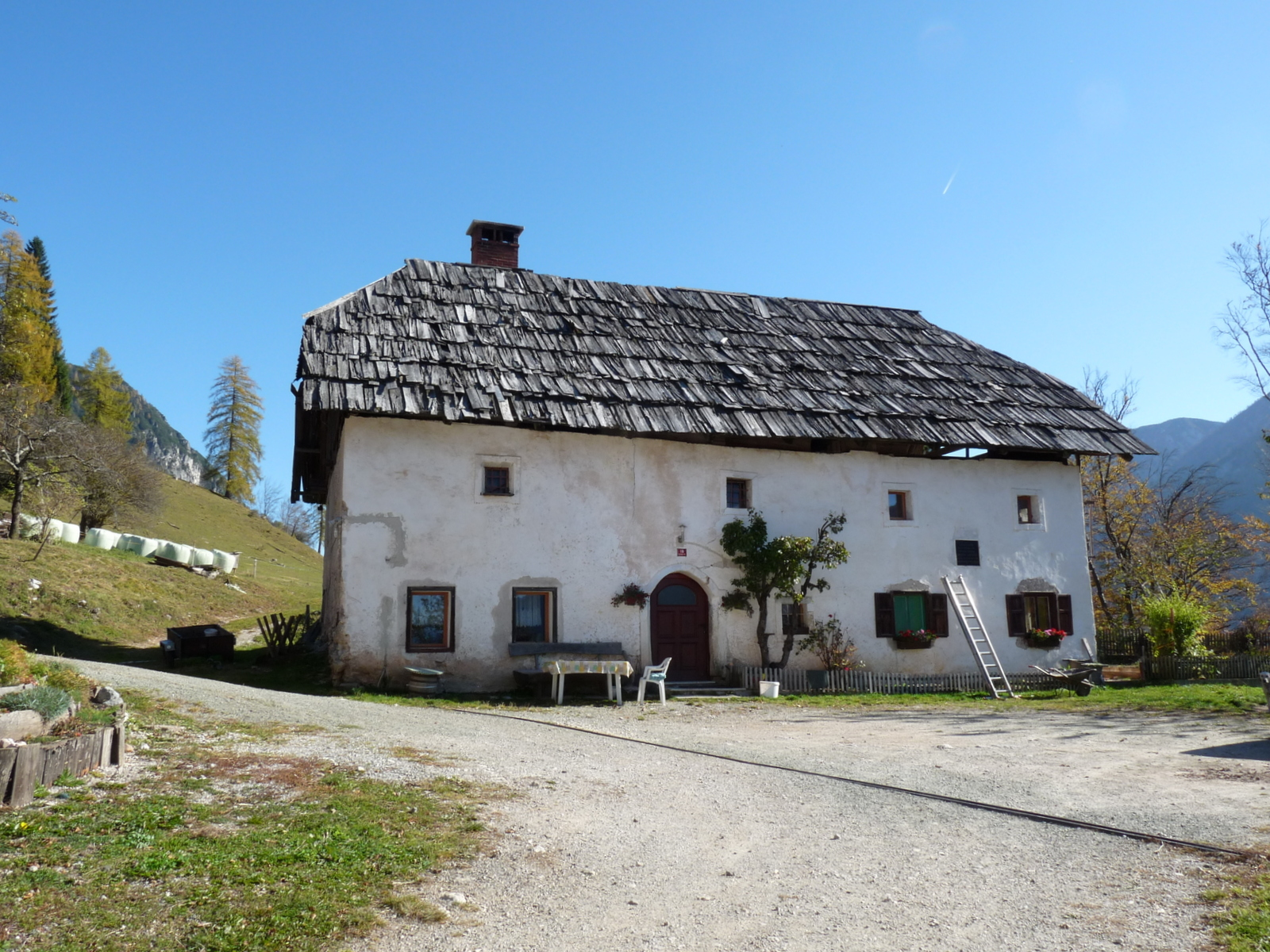
The Vavčar farm in Srednji Vrh, the birthplace of Lovrenc Lavtižar

Lovrenc Lavtižar (December 11, 1820 – December 3, 1858), also known as Lawrence Lautishar, was a Slovene missionary in Minnesota.

== Biography ==
Lavtižar was born in the village of Srednji Vrh in Upper Carniola and baptized Lorenz Lautischar. He was ordained on August 3, 1845 in Ljubljana, after which he worked in Trebelno and Dobrova. In 1854 he traveled as a missionary to the Native American tribes in Michigan, where he worked with Frederic Baraga and Ignatius Mrak in L'Arbre Croche (now Harbor Springs). Francis Xavier Pierz invited him to Minnesota in 1857, where he was assigned to the Red Lake Indian Reservation. Lavtižar froze to death during a blizzard while returning across the ice of Red Lake after attending to a dying member of his congregation. He was buried by Pierz in Crow Wing, Minnesota on December 26, 1858. He was reburied at Calvary Cemetery in Duluth, Minnesota on September 22, 1892, with a burial service presided over by James Trobec.
