= Kremenik =

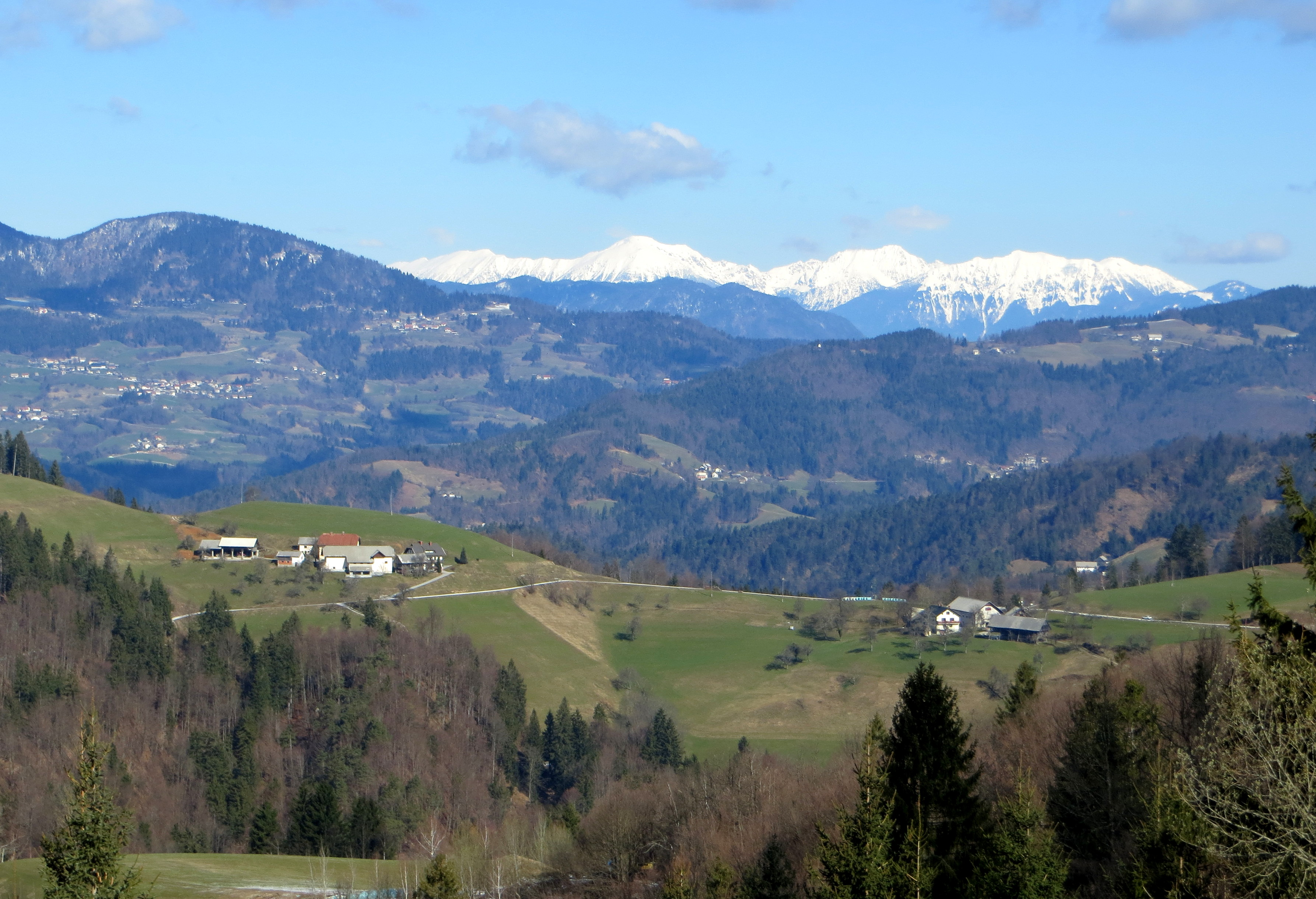

- Location in Slovenia
- Coordinates: 46°5′28.17″N 14°12′6.13″E
- Country: Slovenia
- Traditional region: Upper Carniola
- Statistical region: Upper Carniola
- Municipality: Gorenja Vas–Poljane

Area
  - Total: 1.59 km^{2} (0.61 sq mi)
- Elevation: 713.5 m (2,341 ft)

Population (2020)
  - Total: 19
  - Density: 12/km^{2} (31/sq mi)

Kremenik (pronounced [kɾɛˈmeːnik]) is a small dispersed settlement in the hills south of Poljane nad Škofjo Loko in the Municipality of Gorenja Vas–Poljane in the Upper Carniola region of Slovenia.
