= Lavtarski Vrh =

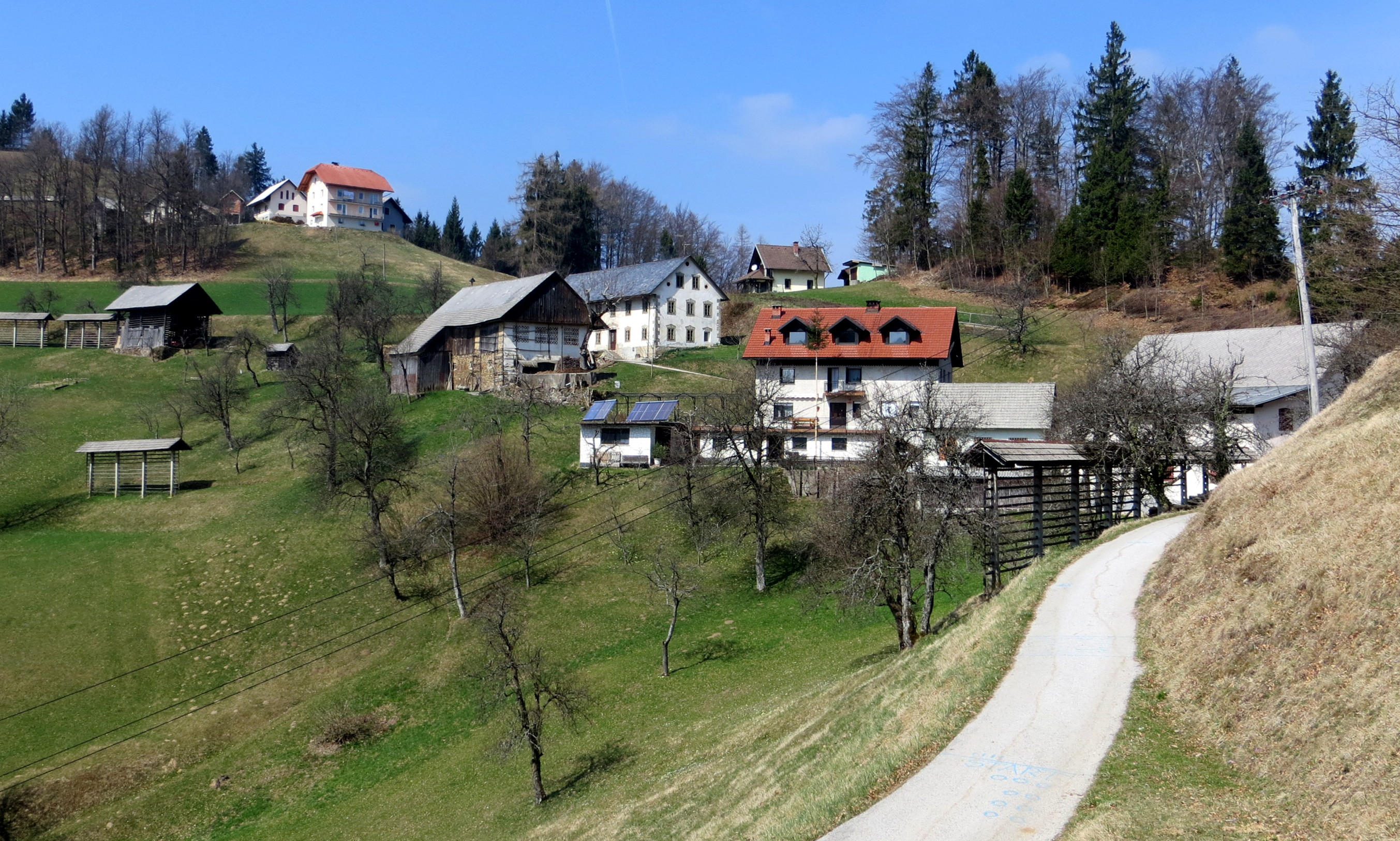

- Location in Slovenia
- Coordinates: 46°12′48.82″N 14°16′29.46″E
- Country: Slovenia
- Traditional region: Upper Carniola
- Statistical region: Upper Carniola
- Municipality: Kranj

Area
  - Total: 1.24 km^{2} (0.48 sq mi)
- Elevation: 721.5 m (2,367 ft)

Population (2002)
  - Total: 29

Lavtarski Vrh (pronounced [ˈlaːu̯taɾski ˈʋəɾx], German: Lauterskiwerch) is a small dispersed settlement above Čepulje in the Municipality of Kranj in the Upper Carniola region of Slovenia.

== Geography ==
Lavtarski Vrh stands on a ridge where the crests of Hrastnik Hill (806 meters or 2,644 feet) and Planica Hill (823 meters or 2,700 feet) meet. It received a modern road connection in 1965, when the road from Stražišče was extended westward, toward the Selca Sora Valley.

== Name ==
Lavtarski Vrh was attested in written sources as Waltherschogel in 1291, Waltersskhiuorch in 1584, and Woltharski Verch in 1610. It was also recorded in the past as Balterskhiwurch. In 1291 the village's name was also recorded as Hrastnica, named after Hrastnik Hill to the southwest. It is also known as Lavtršnji Vrh in the local dialect. The modern name Lavtarski Vrh is a result of dialect metathesis, and it is equivalent to Valterski Vrh, a village 11.5 kilometers (7.1 mi) to the south-southwest.
