= Srednji Vrh, Dobrova–Polhov Gradec =

Srednji Vrh
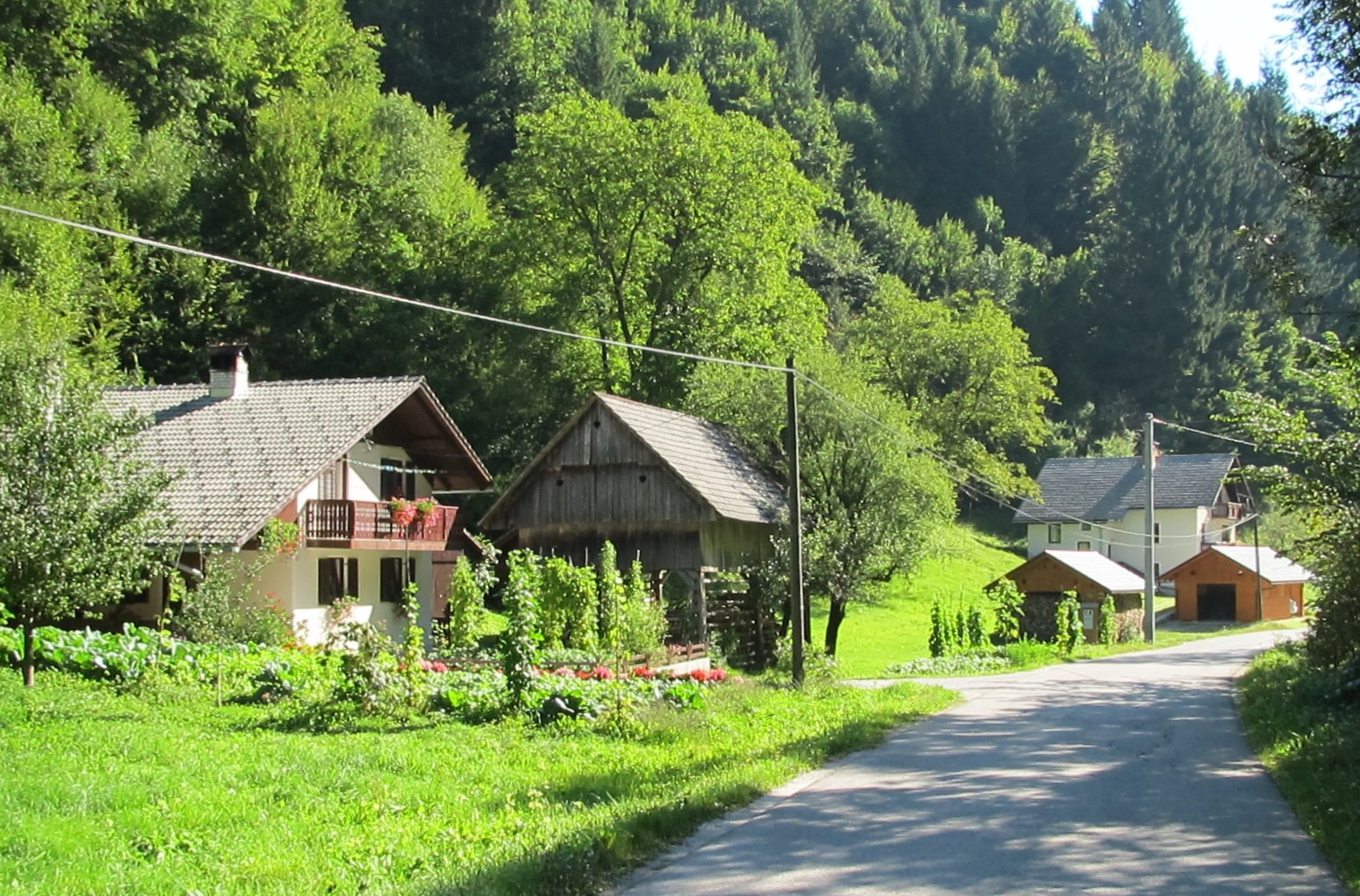

- Location in Slovenia
- Coordinates: 46°4′12.69″N 14°15′18.02″E
- Country: Slovenia
- Traditional region: Upper Carniola
- Statistical region: Central Slovenia
- Municipality: Dobrova–Polhov Gradec

Area
  - Total: 4.32 km^{2} (1.67 sq mi)
- Elevation: 664 m (2,178 ft)

Population (2020)
  - Total: 94
  - Density: 22/km^{2} (56/sq mi)

Srednji Vrh (pronounced [ˈsɾeːdnji ˈʋəɾx]) is a dispersed settlement in the hills west of Polhov Gradec in the Municipality of Dobrova–Polhov Gradec in the Upper Carniola region of Slovenia.

== Name ==
Srednji Vrh is one of several neighboring villages whose names end with vrh 'peak' (cf. Bukov Vrh, Črni Vrh, Kovski Vrh, and Valterski Vrh). The name Srednji Vrh literally means 'middle peak'. Srednji Vrh and names like it (e.g., Srednje) indicate that the settlement (or, in this case, the hill associated with it) lay in some sort of central or middle position. The name is unrelated to names derived from sreda 'Wednesday' (e.g., Središče ob Dravi).

== Gallery ==
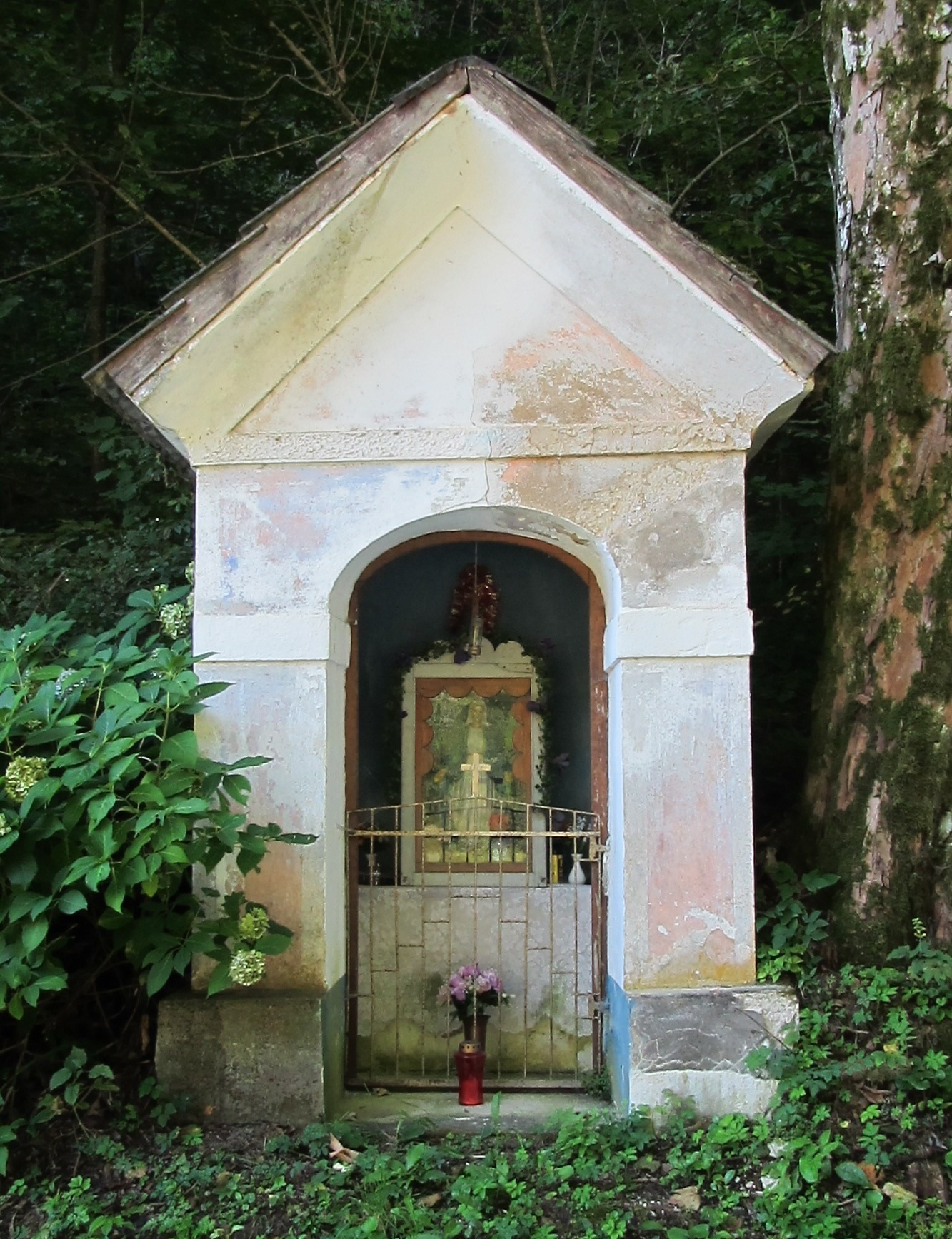
Wayside shrine in Srednji Vrh
