= Aleš Ušeničnik =

Slovene priest, philosopher and sociologist (1868-1952)

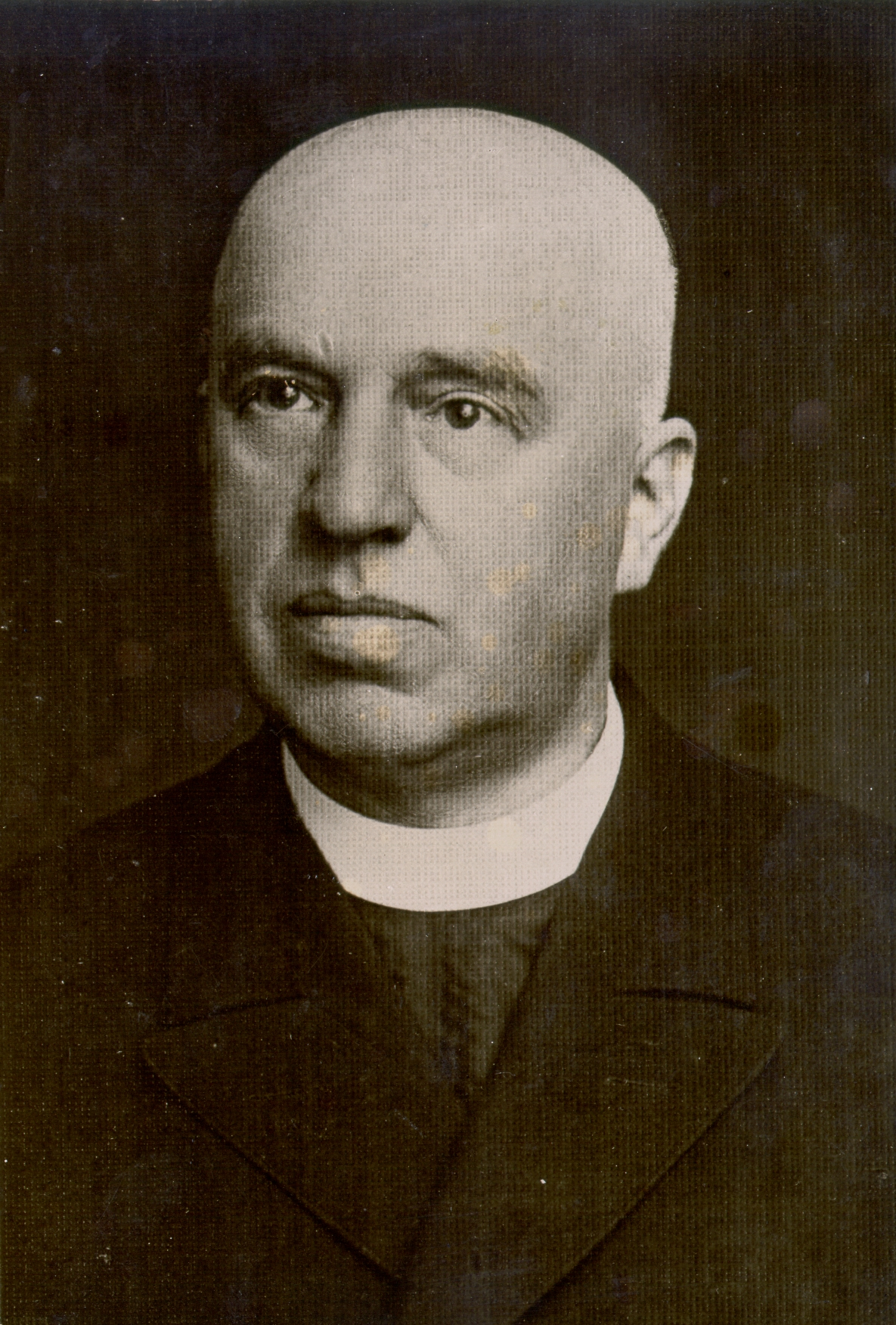
- Born: July 3, 1868; Poljane, Austria-Hungary
- Died: March 30, 1952 (aged 83); Ljubljana, Slovenia, Yugoslavia
- Occupations: Priest, theologian

Aleš Ušeničnik (3 July 1868 – 30 March 1952) was a Slovene Roman Catholic priest, philosopher, sociologist and theologian. He was one of the main philosophers of neo-Thomism in Slovenia and in Yugoslavia.

Ušeničnik was born in the village of Poljane near the Upper Carniolan town of Škofja Loka, in what was then the Austro-Hungarian Empire (now in Slovenia). He studied theology at the Pontifical Gregorian University in Rome. In 1897, he became a professor at the Theological Seminary in Ljubljana. In 1919, he became a professor at the Faculty of Theology at the University of Ljubljana, where he taught philosophy. In 1922 and 1923, he served as the fourth chancellor of the University of Ljubljana. In 1937, he became a member of the Pontifical Academy of St. Thomas Aquinas and in 1938 one of the founding members of the Academy of Sciences and Arts in Ljubljana (later renamed the Slovenian Academy of Sciences and Arts). In 1948, he was expelled from the academy by the new communist regime. His membership was reinstated in 1996 after the collapse of communism.

He died in Ljubljana in 1952.
