= Ivan Tavčar =

Slovenian writer and politician (1851–1923)

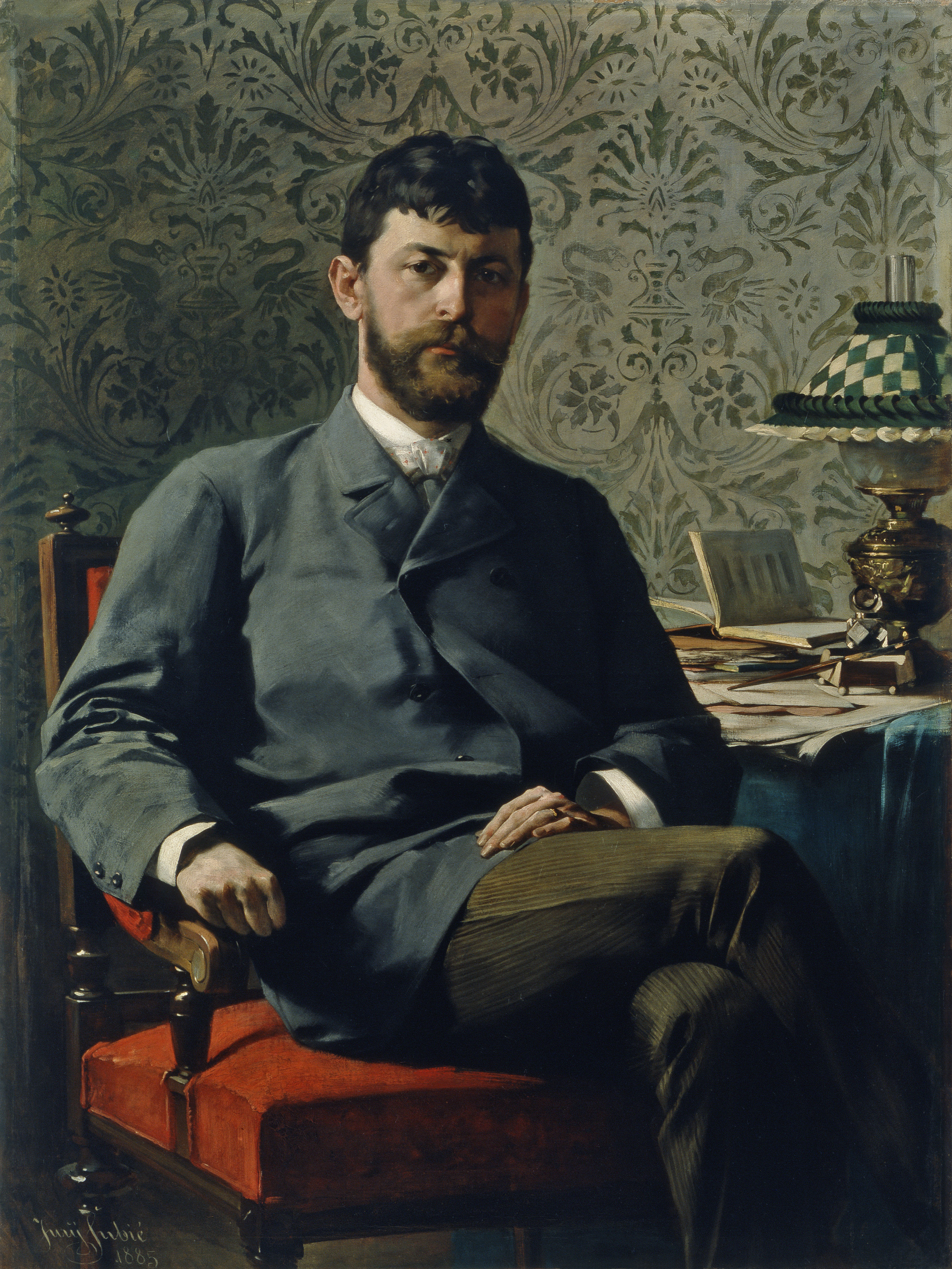
Portrait of Ivan Tavčar by Jurij Šubic

Ivan Tavčar (28 August 1851 – 19 February 1923) was a Slovenian writer, lawyer, and politician.

== Biography ==
Tavčar was born into the poor peasant family of Janez and Neža née Perko in the Carniolan village of Poljane near Škofja Loka in what was then the Austrian Empire (now Slovenia). He was baptized Janez Taučar. It has never been entirely clear who his father was. This disputed origin significantly influenced Tavčar's later personal life and political decisions.

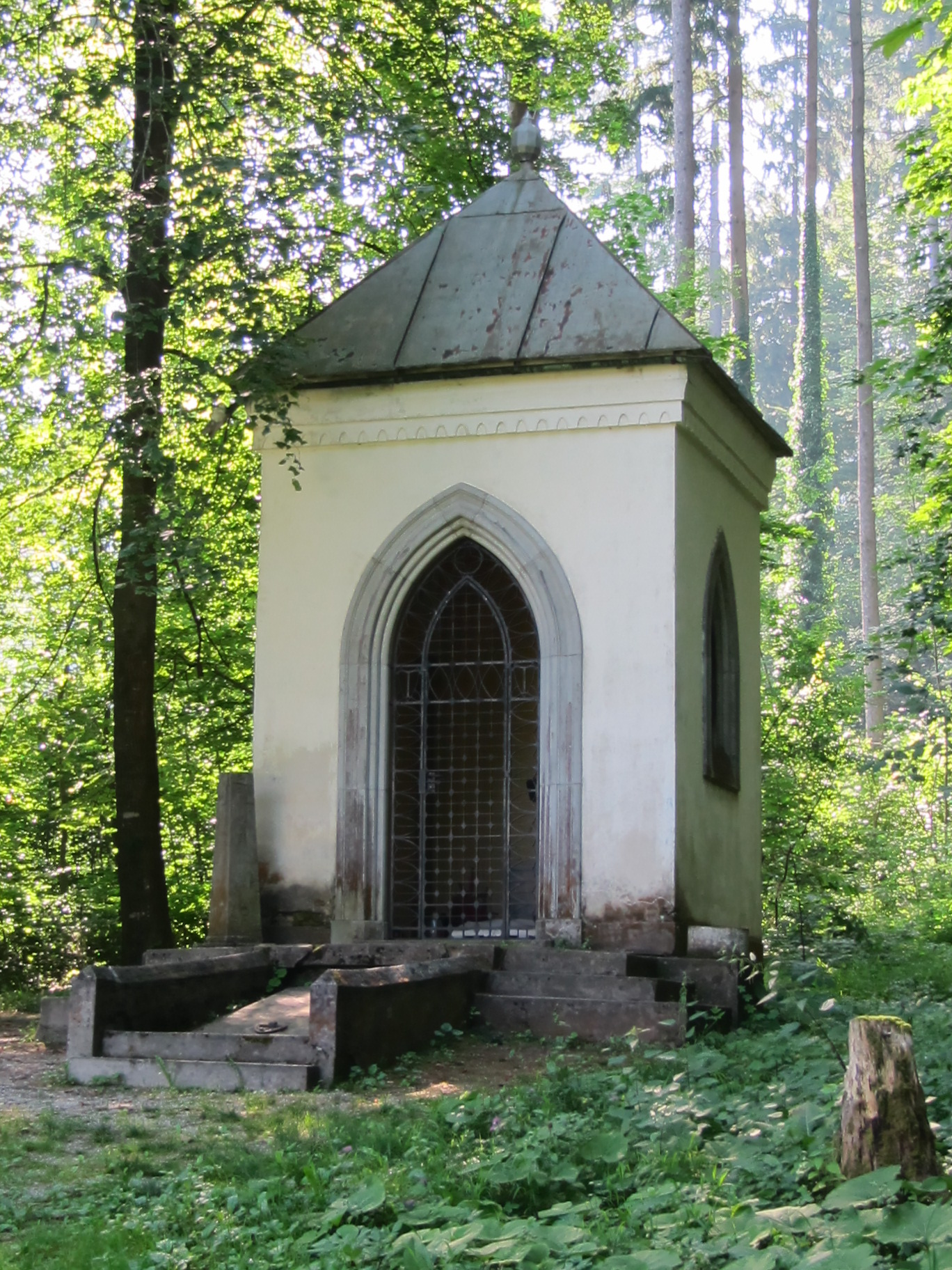
Tavčar's tomb at the Visoko estate

He started schooling in his home village and continued in Ljubljana, from which he was expelled for disciplinary reasons. For a while he attended secondary school in Novo Mesto and eventually returned to Ljubljana. In 1871 he began studying law at the University of Vienna. He began his political career in the Provincial Assembly of the Duchy of Carniola, where he formed the core of a radical group of Slovene liberals together with Ivan Hribar. He became one of the leading members of the National Progressive Party and long served as the chief editor of the party journal Slovenski narod, succeeding Josip Jurčič. Between 1901 and 1907 he was member of the Austrian Parliament. In 1911, he succeeded Ivan Hribar as mayor of Ljubljana.

In 1887, he married Franja Košenini, who later became the leading figure in the Slovene women's associations at the time. The marriage won Tavčar entrance to Ljubljana high society and enabled him to buy the Visoko manor in 1893 and to become the mayor of Ljubljana in 1911. The couple was the center of the social life in Ljubljana. They were both active in many organizations. Tavčar was very enthusiastic about sports and promoted cycling and athletics. He was one of the founders of the Sokol movement in the Slovene Lands.

Tavčar remained in office as the mayor of Ljubljana until 1921, when he withdrew from public life after being diagnosed with colorectal cancer. He spent his last years on his estate in Visoko, where he is buried.

== Politics ==
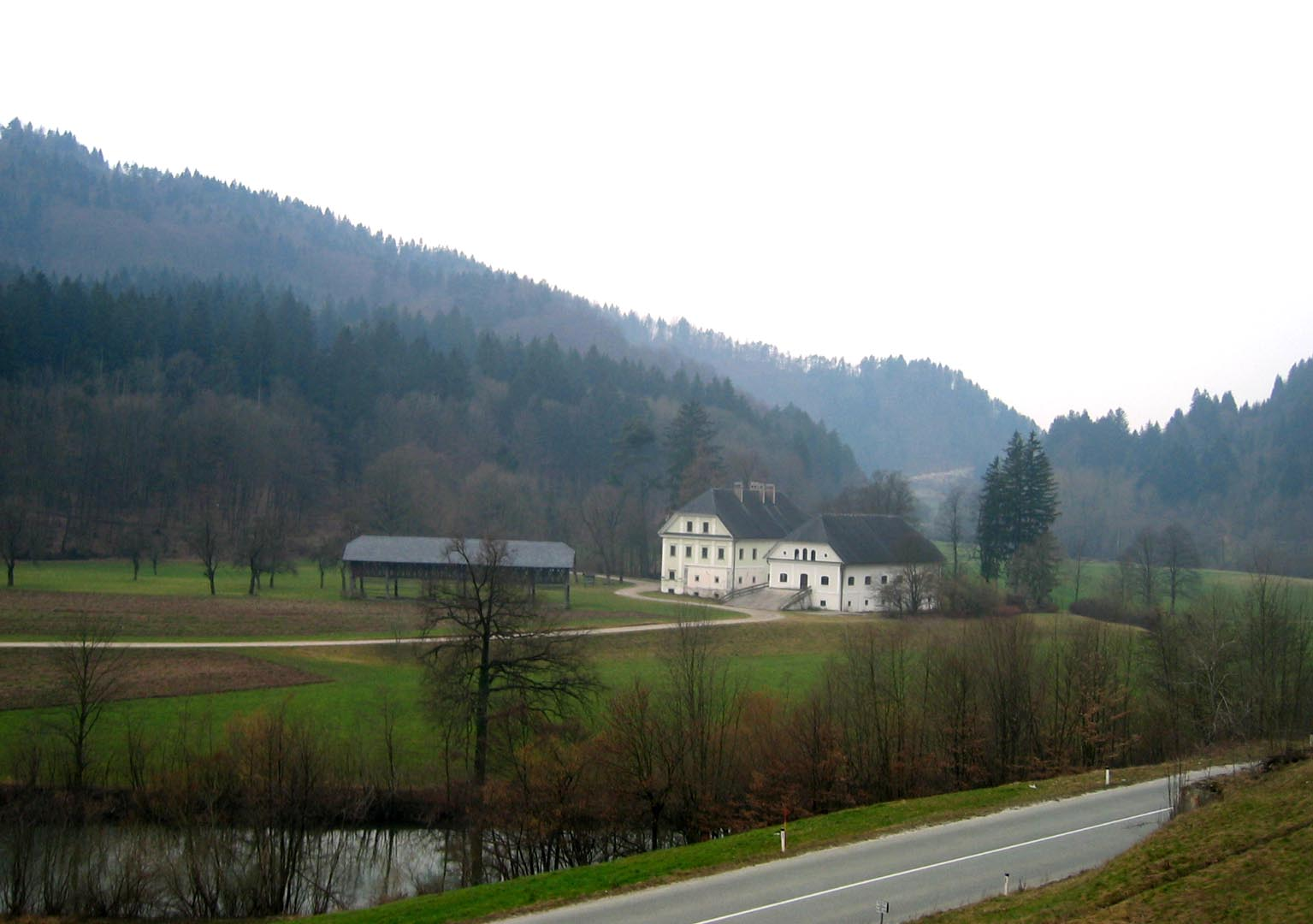
Tavčar's estate in Visoko near Škofja Loka

Ivan Tavčar was one of the main figures in the national-liberal political movement in the Slovene Lands which emerged in the late 19th century from the Young Slovenes movement. After the Slovenian National Movement split into the Catholic and Progressive wing in the late 1880s, Tavčar became one of the co-founders of the National Party of Carniola (renamed the National Progressive Party in 1905). He led the party together with Ivan Hribar until the end of World War I, when it was renamed the Yugoslav Democratic Party before merging into the State Party of Serbian, Croatian and Slovene Democrats. After 1918, Tavčar became a staunch supporter of Yugoslav unitarism; that is, the merger of the Slovenes, Croats, and Serbs into one Yugoslav nation. However, he did not play a major political role during the last years of his life due to his deteriorating health.

Tavčar was also known for his polemics with the Catholic theoretician Anton Mahnič. In 1884, Mahnič published a satirical short story entitled Indija Koromandija, in which he mocked the progressive ideas of Josip Stritar, whom Tavčar admired. Tavčar responded with the dystopic novel named 4000, in which he described the sad and repressive society resulting from the implementation of Mahnič's integralist policies.

== Literary work ==
Tavčar was influenced by the literature of the older generation of Slovenian nationalist and liberal authors, known as Young Slovenes (Mladoslovenci), among them Fran Levstik, Josip Jurčič, Josip Stritar, and Janko Kersnik. However, Tavčar was one of the first who fully adhered to Literary realism, rejecting the post-romanticism of the Young Slovenes.
He started writing at the age of 17 in a school magazine and attained stylistic maturity in his latest works. He signed many of his works with the pseudonym Emil Leon. He often depicted rural environments of his native Upper Carniola, in which he saw a genuine and healthy counterpart to the somehow degenerate urban life. His most important work is Visoška kronika (The Visoko Chronicle), a short historical novel set in the period after the Thirty Years' War in the 17th century. Another important work is Cvetje v jeseni (Blossoms in Autumn), a novel of a middle age urban dweller who moves to the countryside, where he falls in love with a younger girl.

Although he never rejected his Catholicism, he was essentially an agnostic who adhered to an outward naturalistic world view. In his novels, he conveyed a critically optimistic view on the human condition, drawing from the tradition of Enlightenment and humanism.

== Selected works ==
- Ivan Slavelj (1876)
- Vita vitae meae (1883)
- Mrtva srca (The Dead Hearts, 1884)
- Janez Sonce (1885–1886)
- Med gorami (Among the Mountains, a collection of short stories, 1876–1888)
- Grajski pisar (The Castle Scribe, 1889)
- 4000 (1891)
- V Zali (In the Zala Valley, 1894)
- Izza kongresa (Behind the Congress, 1905–1908)
- Cvetje v jeseni (Blossoms in Autumn, 1917)
- Visoška kronika (The Visoko Chronicle, 1919)

== See also ==
- Anton Aškerc
- Slovenian literature
- Culture of Slovenia
- Liberalism in Slovenia

Preceded by Ivan Hribar	Mayor of Ljubljana; 1911–1921	Succeeded by Ljudevit Perič
