= Visoko pri Poljanah =

Visoko pri Poljanah Visoko (until 1953)
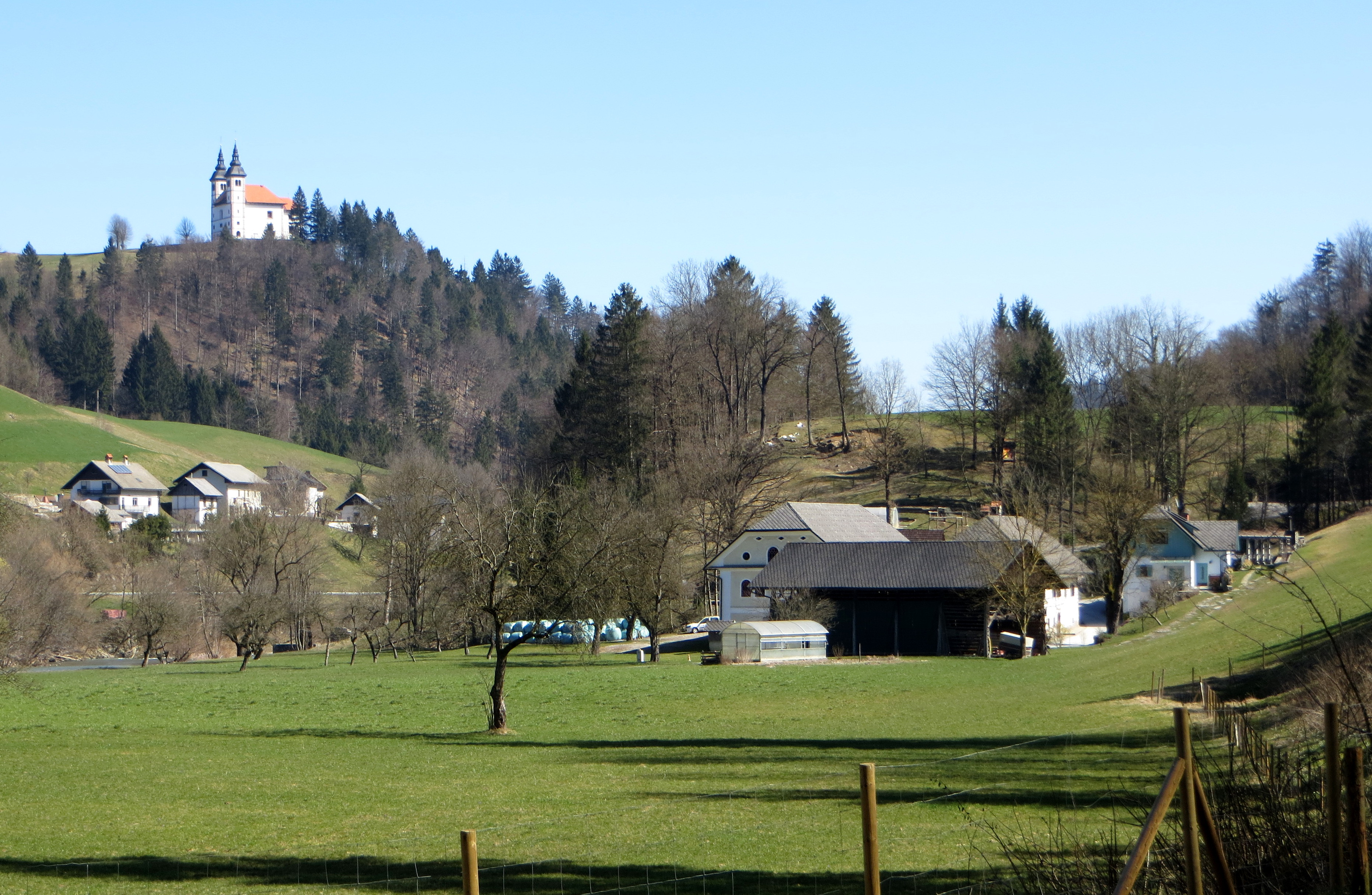

- Location in Slovenia
- Coordinates: 46°7′35.4″N 14°12′43.43″E
- Country: Slovenia
- Traditional region: Upper Carniola
- Statistical region: Upper Carniola
- Municipality: Škofja Loka
- Elevation: 380.3 m (1,248 ft)

Population (2016)
  - Total: 24

Visoko pri Poljanah (pronounced [ʋiˈsɔːkɔ pɾi pɔˈljaːnax]; German: Wisoko) is a settlement in the Municipality of Škofja Loka in the Upper Carniola region of Slovenia.

== Name ==
The name of the settlement was changed from Visoko to Visoko pri Poljanah in 1953. In the past the German name was Wisoko.

== Visoko estate ==
The Kalan farm

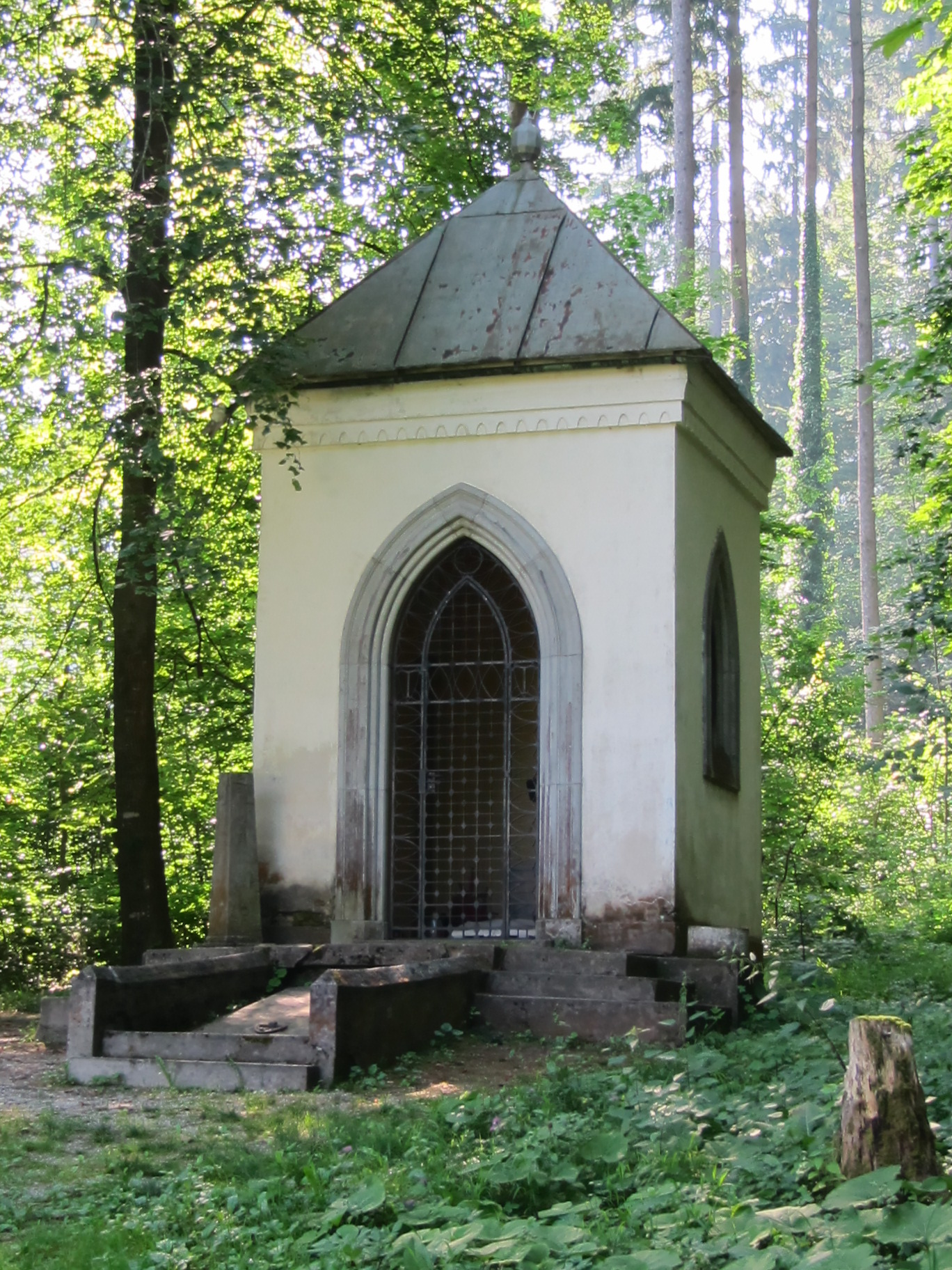
Tavčar's tomb

The Visoko estate

The Visoko estate in the Poljane Valley is part of this settlement. It comprises two large farms, first mentioned in documents as early as the 13th century. The Kalan farm was arranged by the writer and politician Ivan Tavčar into his manor. In his best-known work, The Visoko Chronicles, Tavčar describes events taking place on this estate in the 17th century, when the Kalan family were overlords of the entire valley. There is a bronze statue of the writer by the sculptor Jakob Savinšek close to the manor house. Tavčar is also buried at Visoko.
