= Srednji Vrh, Kranjska Gora =

Srednji Vrh
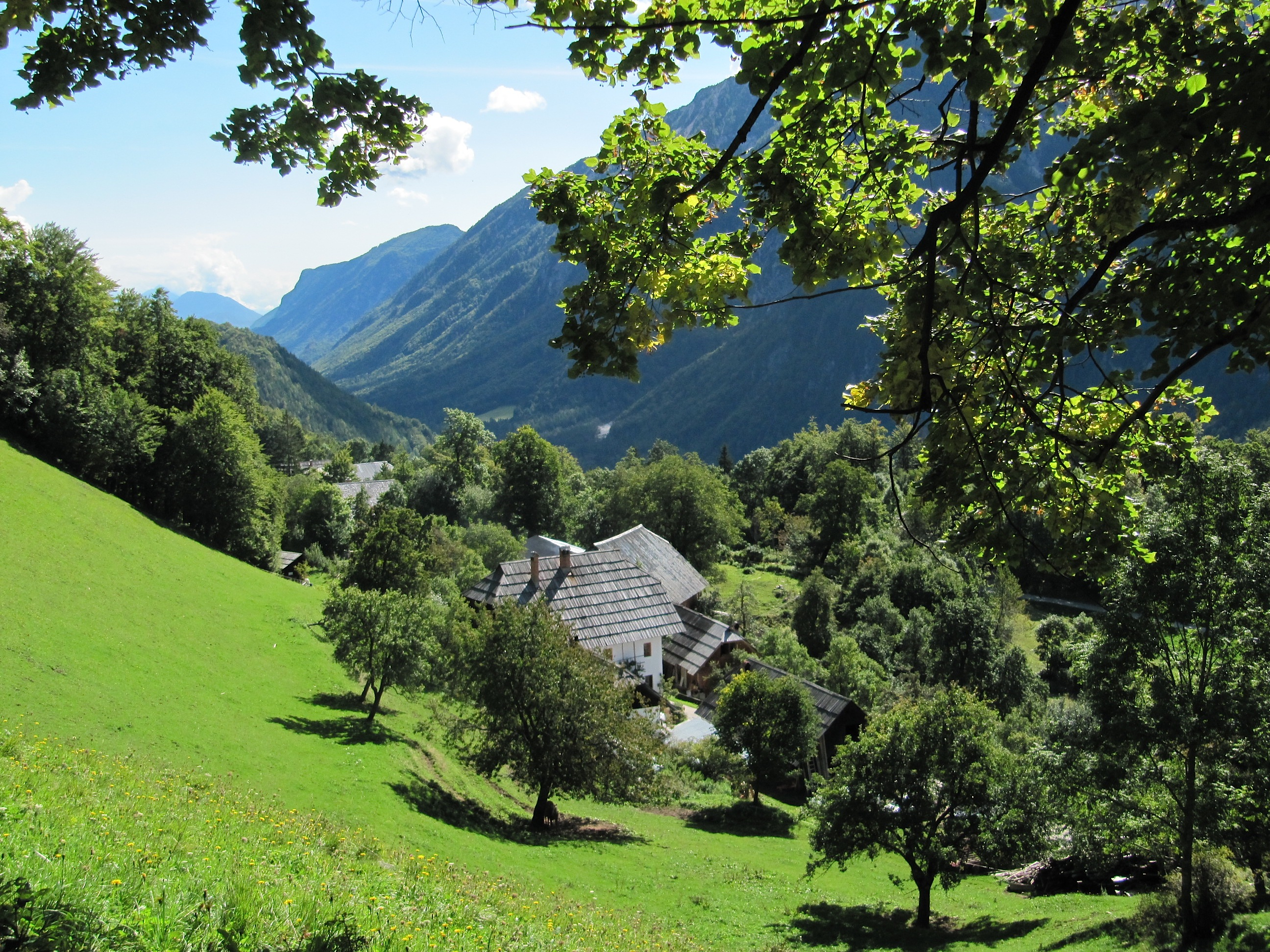

- Location in Slovenia
- Coordinates: 46°29′25.41″N 13°50′11.86″E
- Country: Slovenia
- Traditional region: Upper Carniola
- Statistical region: Upper Carniola
- Municipality: Kranjska Gora
- Elevation: 960.7 m (3,152 ft)

Population (2002)
  - Total: 38

Srednji Vrh (pronounced [ˈsɾeːdnji ˈʋəɾx]) is a settlement in the Municipality of Kranjska Gora in the Upper Carniola region of Slovenia.

== Notable people ==
Notable people that were born or lived in Srednji Vrh include:

- Lovrenc Lavtižar (1820–1858), missionary
