= Bukovica, Škofja Loka =

Bukovica
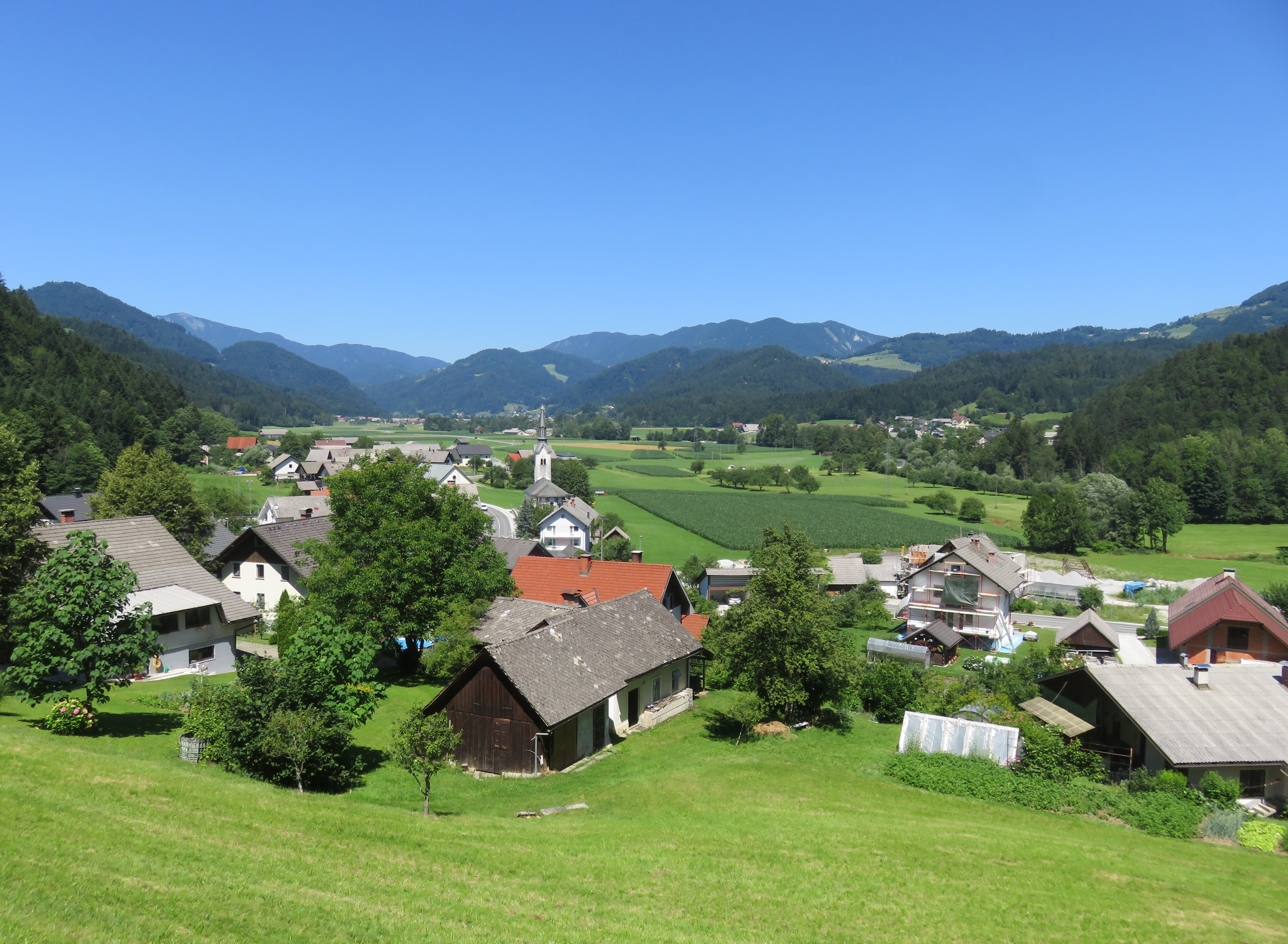

- Location in Slovenia
- Coordinates: 46°12′2.06″N 14°14′31.12″E
- Country: Slovenia
- Traditional region: Upper Carniola
- Statistical region: Upper Carniola
- Municipality: Škofja Loka

Area
  - Total: 1.89 km^{2} (0.73 sq mi)
- Elevation: 395.3 m (1,297 ft)

Population (2002)
  - Total: 154

Bukovica (pronounced [ˈbuːkɔʋitsa]; German: Wukouza) is a village in the Municipality of Škofja Loka in the Upper Carniola region of Slovenia.

== Name ==
Bukovica was attested in written sources in 1291 as Bukkebitz (and as Bukkawitz in 1318 and Wukawicz in 1485). Bukovica is a common toponym and oronym in Slovenia. It is derived from the adjective bukov 'beech' (from bukev 'beech tree') and originally referred to the local vegetation. In the past the German name was Wukouza.

== Church ==
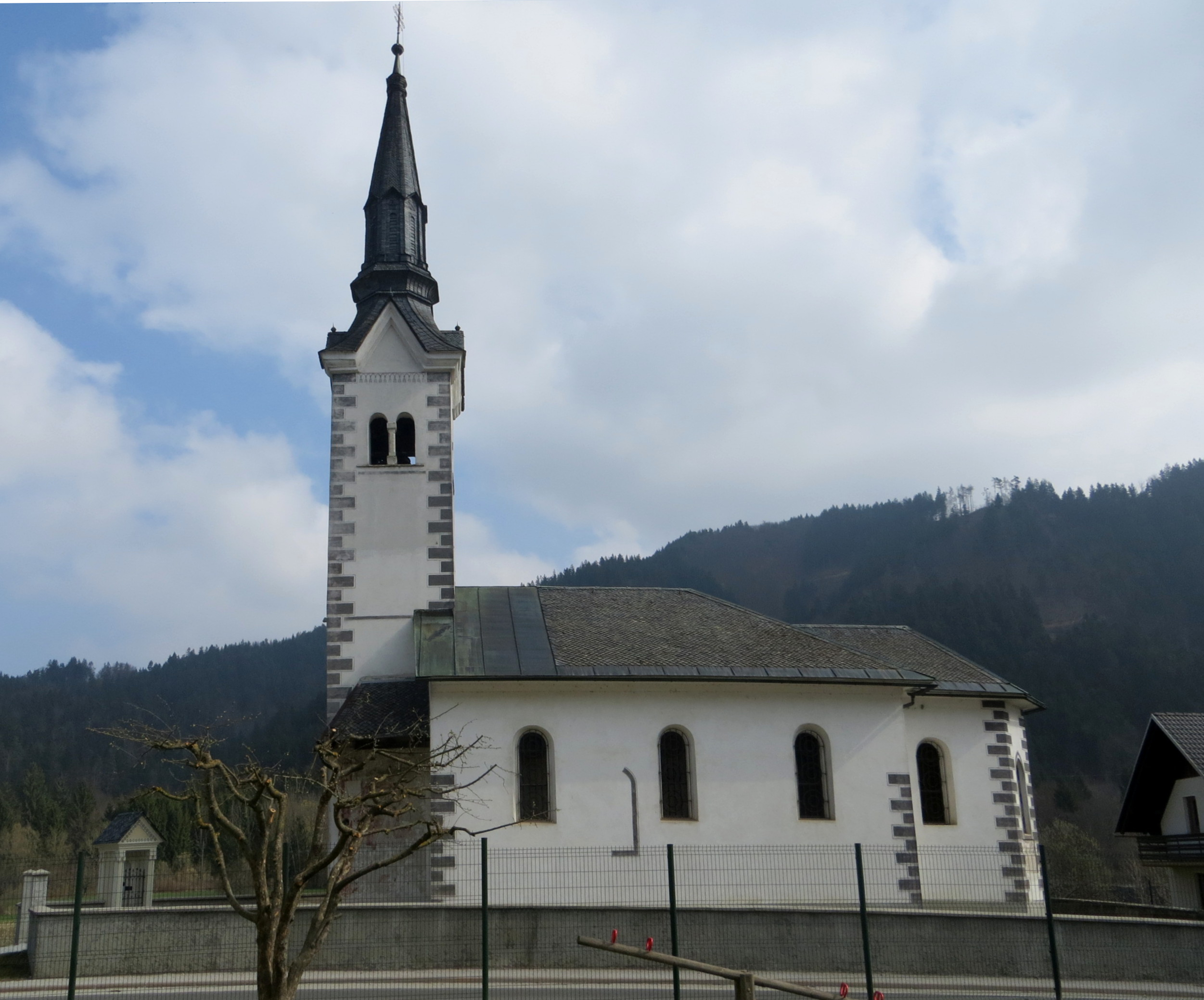
Saint Florian's Church

The local church is dedicated to Saint Florian.

== See also ==
- List of Glagolitic inscriptions (16th century)
