= Staniše =

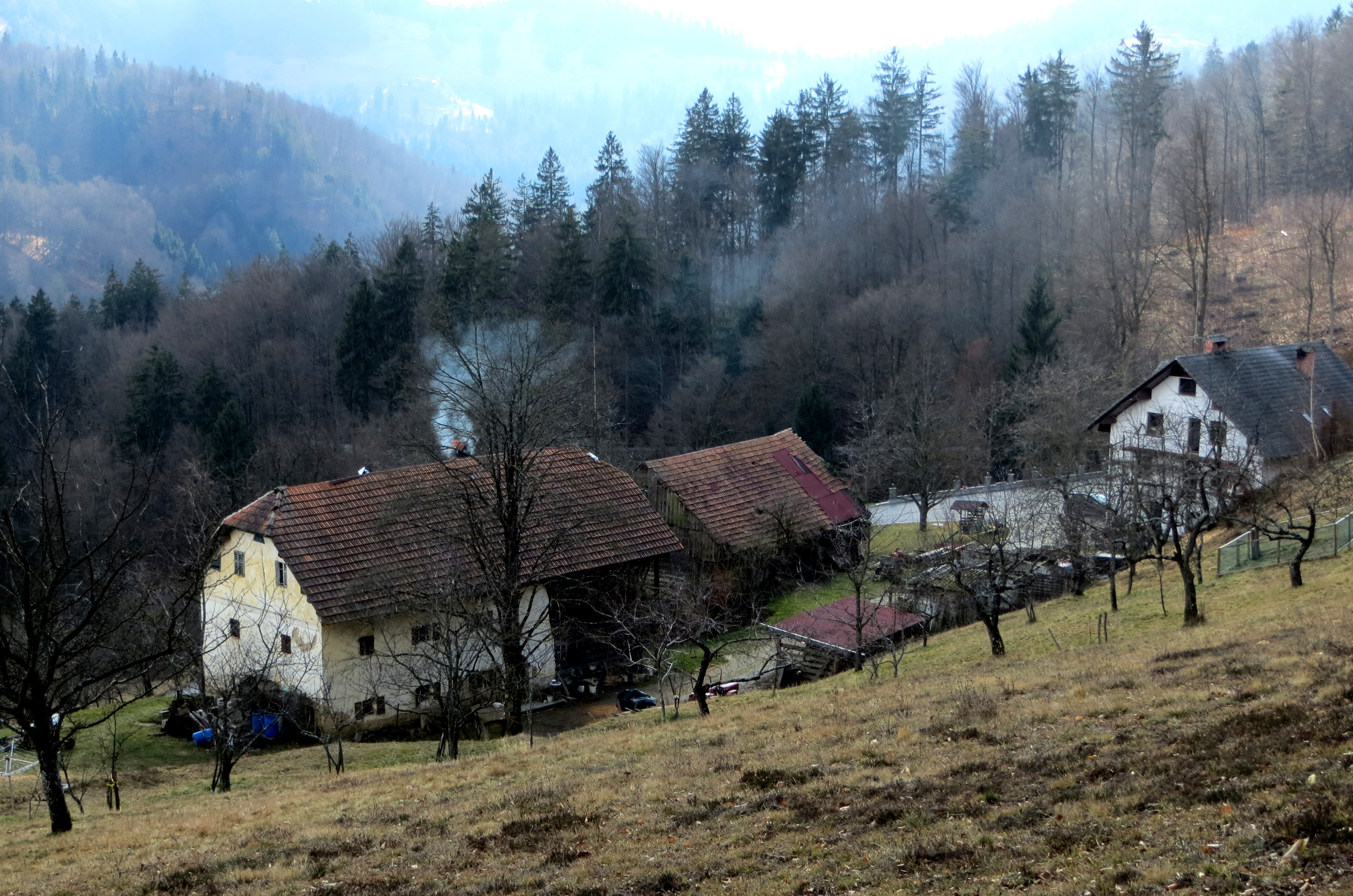

- Location in Slovenia
- Coordinates: 46°7′12.2″N 14°15′27.72″E
- Country: Slovenia
- Traditional region: Upper Carniola
- Statistical region: Upper Carniola
- Municipality: Škofja Loka

Area
  - Total: 3.41 km^{2} (1.32 sq mi)
- Elevation: 773.8 m (2,539 ft)

Population (2019)
  - Total: 7

Staniše (pronounced [staˈniːʃɛ]; in older sources also Stanišče, German: Stanische) is a small settlement in the Municipality of Škofja Loka in the Upper Carniola region of Slovenia.

== Geography ==
Staniše consists of a few isolated farms on a ridge in the Polhov Gradec Hills above the left banks of Bodovlje Creek (Bodoljska grapa) and its tributary Mlaka Creek. The highest point in the settlement is Polhovec Hill (elevation 948 meters or 3,110 feet) in the southwest part of the settlement. Krgana Hill (elevation 768 meters or 2,520 feet) stands on the northern edge of the settlement. Two properties, the Stanišnik and Na Koglu farms, have been abandoned and are overgrown by forest, and three others (the Jamnik, Krmelj, and Završnik farms) are still maintained. The village is connected by unpaved roads to the Poljane Sora Valley to the north and to the valley of Bodovlje Creek to the south.

== Name ==
Staniše is recorded as Stanišče in older sources. The name is probably derived from the common noun stanišče 'home, residence', simply referring to a settled place.

== History ==
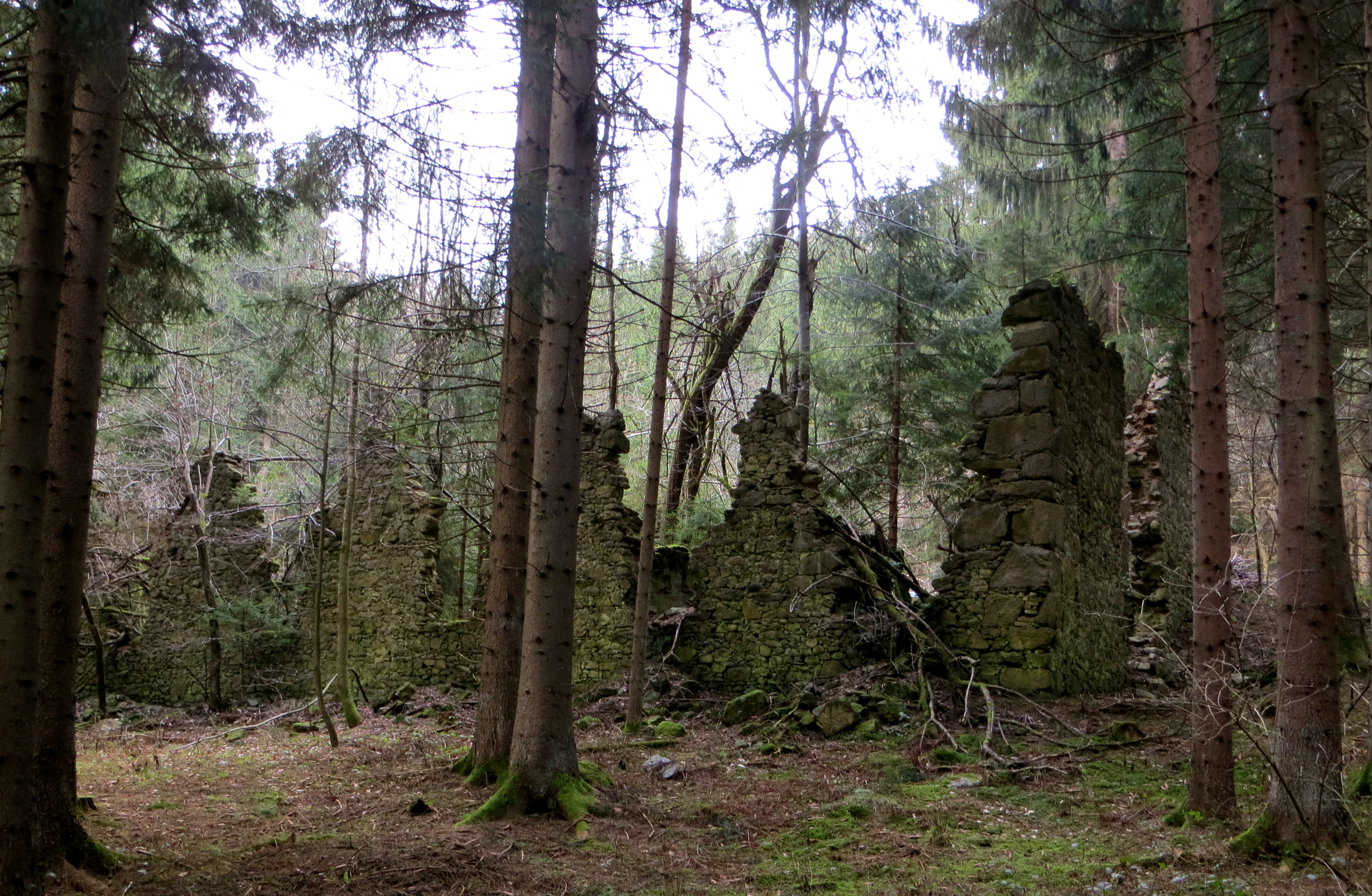
Ruins of the Stanišnik farm

At the beginning of the 19th century, Staniše had seven houses and a population of 60; it has gradually declined ever since. Until the early 20th century, a sawmill operated along Bodovlje Creek. It changed owners frequently in the 19th century, and it was outfitted with a four-horsepower turbine in 1903. During the Second World War a Partisan relay line operated through the village territory from 1943 to 1945, and in 1944 there were engagements between the Partisans' Skofja Loka Detachment and German forces. The owners of the Stanišnik farm were murdered by the Partisans during the war, as a result of which the farm was abandoned in 1945. A farm tourism business currently operates at the Jamnik farm.

== Notable people ==
Notable people that were born or lived in Staniše include:

- Matej Kožuh (1824–1896), dean in Kočevje and Stara Loka, and honorary papal chamberlain
