= Poljane nad Škofjo Loko =

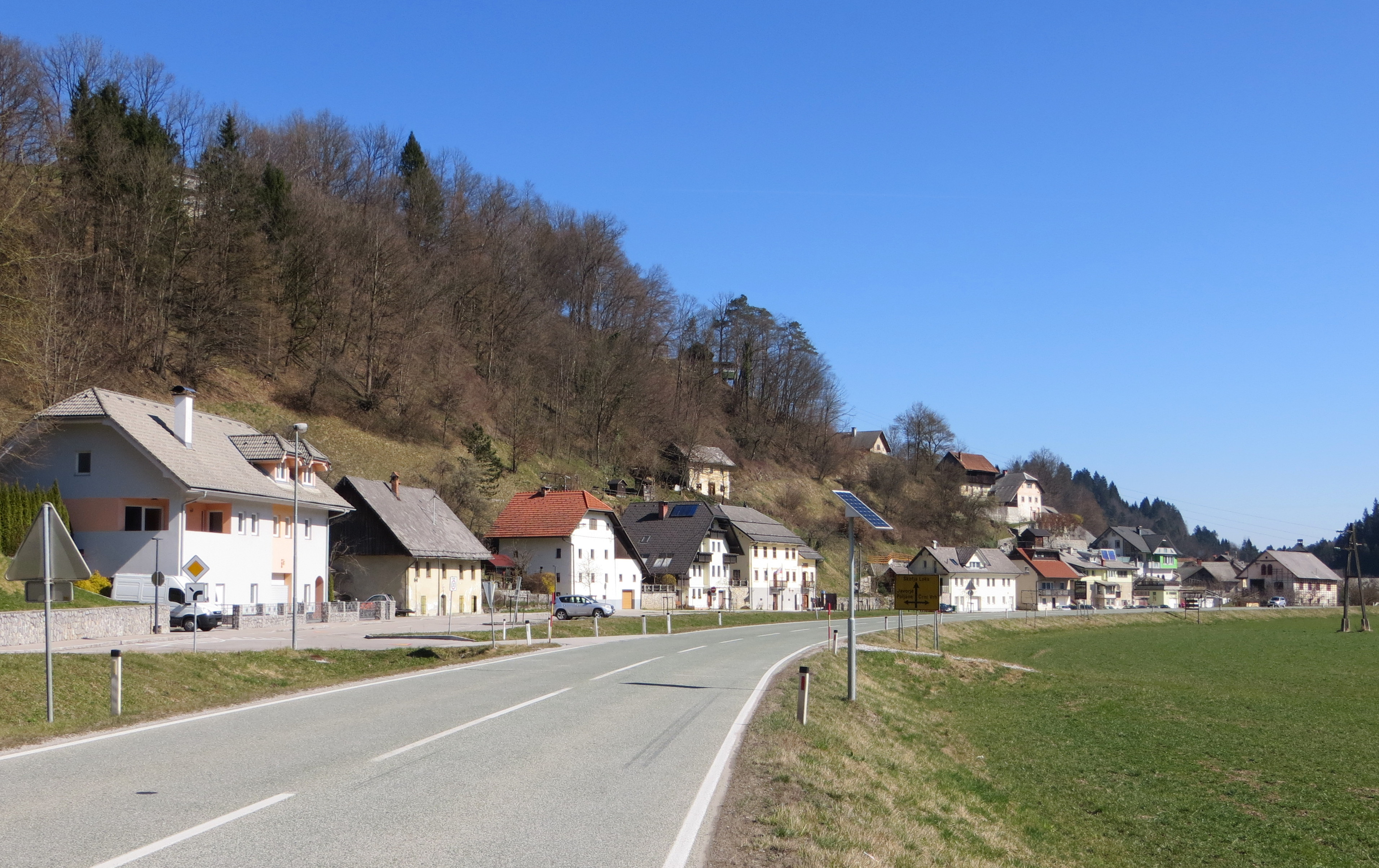

- Location in Slovenia
- Coordinates: 46°7′15.28″N 14°11′4.97″E
- Country: Slovenia
- Traditional region: Upper Carniola
- Statistical region: Upper Carniola
- Municipality: Gorenja Vas–Poljane

Area
  - Total: 1.98 km^{2} (0.76 sq mi)
- Elevation: 398.9 m (1,309 ft)

Population (2020)
  - Total: 475
  - Density: 240/km^{2} (621/sq mi)

Poljane nad Škofjo Loko (pronounced [pɔˈljaːnɛ nat ˈʃkoːfjɔ ˈloːkɔ]; German: Pölland) is a settlement in the Poljane Sora Valley in the Municipality of Gorenja Vas–Poljane in the Upper Carniola region of Slovenia.

== St. Martin's Parish Church ==
The local parish church is dedicated to Saint Martin and was originally a Gothic building that was pulled down and rebuilt in the 1720s, probably by Matija Maček (c. 1657–1737) from the Poljane Valley. The second, Baroque, structure was blown up by the Partisans in 1944 and finally totally demolished in 1956. When this happened, remnants of the original church were found and some carved pieces of stone from the site are kept in the Škofja Loka museum. The current church was built in 1967 and the belfry was replaced in the 1990s.

== Notable residents ==
Notable people that were born or lived in Poljane include:

- Ivan Tavčar (1851–1923), writer and politician
- Aleš Ušeničnik (1862–1952), neo-Thomist philosopher and theologian
