= Črni Vrh, Dobrova–Polhov Gradec =

Črni Vrh
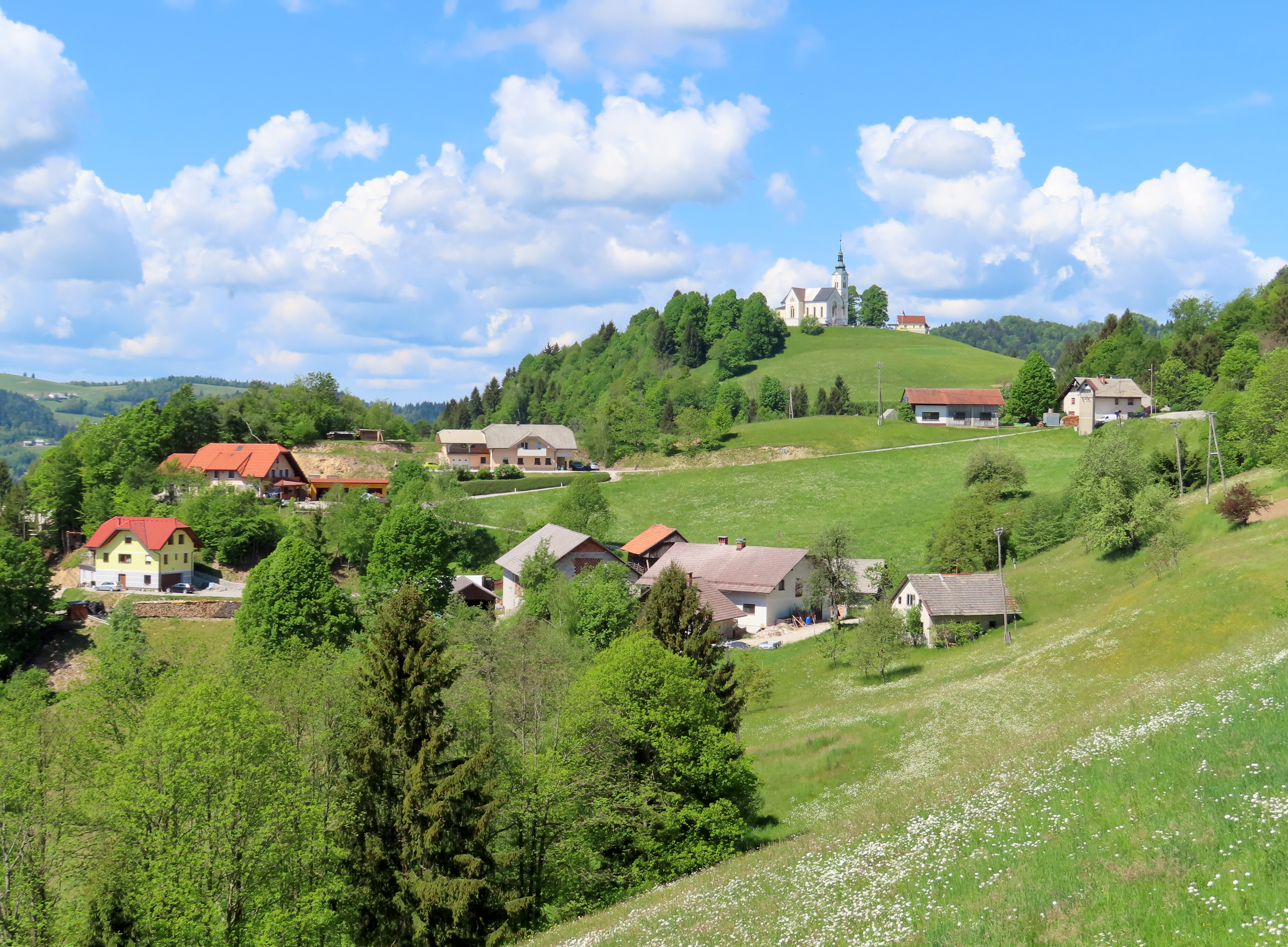

- Location in Slovenia
- Coordinates: 46°5′15.6″N 14°15′32.53″E
- Country: Slovenia
- Traditional region: Upper Carniola
- Statistical region: Central Slovenia
- Municipality: Dobrova–Polhov Gradec

Area
  - Total: 11.22 km^{2} (4.33 sq mi)
- Elevation: 822.3 m (2,698 ft)

Population (2020)
  - Total: 296
  - Density: 26.4/km^{2} (68.3/sq mi)

Črni Vrh (pronounced [ˈtʃəɾni ˈʋəɾx]; German: Schwarzenberg) is a dispersed settlement in the hills northwest of Polhov Gradec in the Municipality of Dobrova–Polhov Gradec in the Upper Carniola region of Slovenia. It includes many isolated farms scattered throughout the hills between Big Božna Creek (Slovene: Velika Božna) to the south, Little Božna Creek (Mala Božna) to the northeast, Dog Plateau (Pasja ravan, 1020 m) to the northwest, and Špilj Hill (860 m) to the south-southeast.

== Name ==
Črni Vrh literally means 'black peak'. It was first mentioned in written sources in 1303 under the equivalent German name Swarcenek 'black hill' and in 1486 as Swarzen perg 'black mountain'. In the past it was known as Schwarzenberg in German. Like other settlements with the same name, the name indicates that it is associated with a hill or mountain covered with dark (coniferous) trees. The element vrh does not necessarily refer to a peak, but can also refer to a mountain pass.

== History ==
The school in Črni Vrh was built in 1938.

== Religious heritage ==
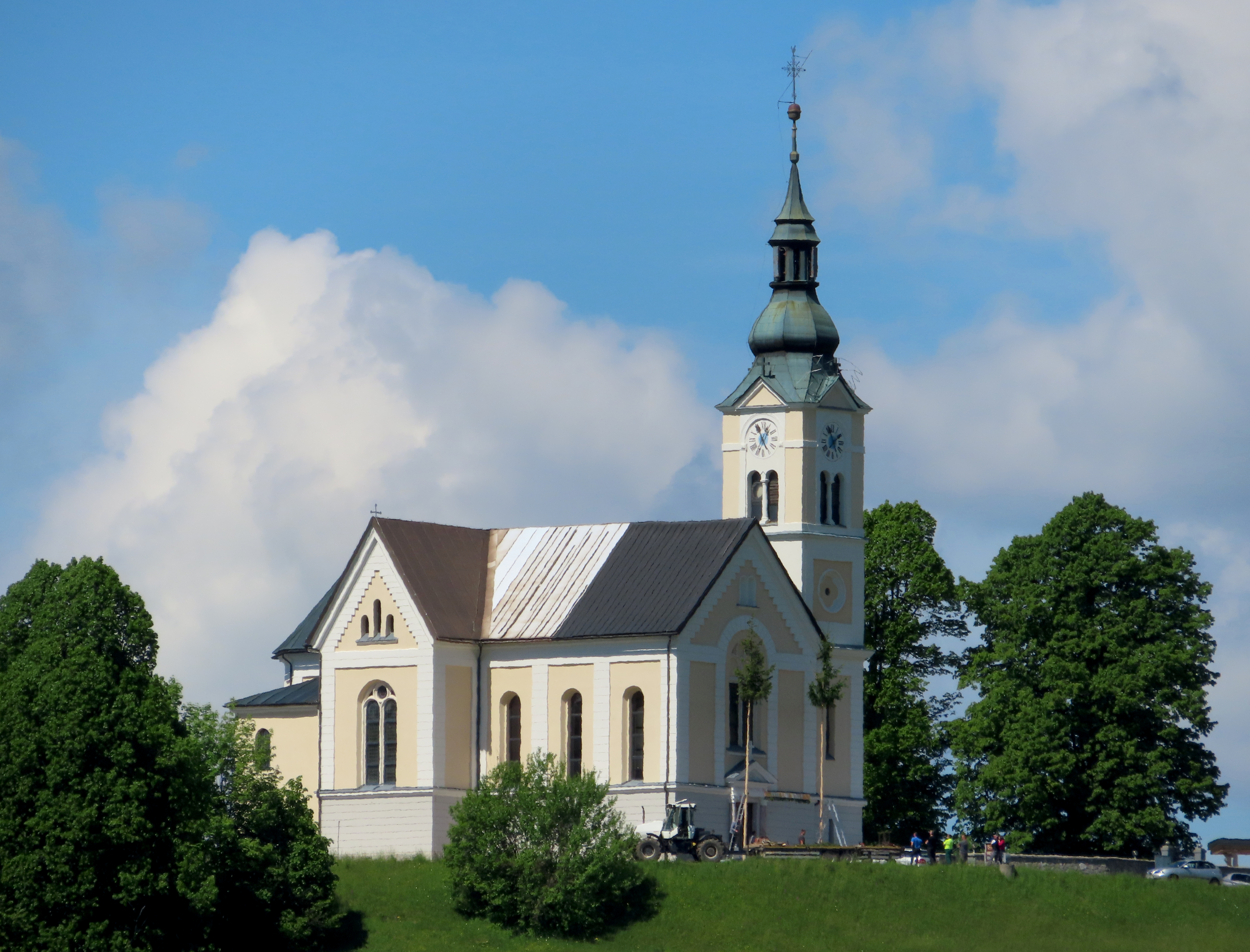
Saint Leonard's Church

The parish church in the settlement is dedicated to Saint Leonard. It stands west of the settlement on Church Hill (Cerkovni grič). A church at the site was first mentioned in 1526, reworked in 1758. The current structure was built in 1899 based on plans by Moritz (or Moric) Kirchschlager after the earthquake of 1895, which destroyed the previous structure. The interior was painted by Simon Ogrin. The main altar was made in the Ljubljana workshop of the Toman (Thomann) family of stonemasons, and the side altar and pulpit are the work of Valentin Šubic (1859–1927). A chapel dedicated to the Virgin Mary was built next to the rectory in 1850. The church is registered as a cultural monument.

A chapel dedicated to the Assumption of Mary stands west of Črni Vrh, next to the rectory along the road to Church Hill. It is an eight-sided structure with an octagonal pyramid roof surmounted by a cupola, and was dedicated in 1851. A bell tower was added on the north side of the chapel in 1889. The interior furnishings date from the same period as its construction and the chapel is registered as a cultural monument.

A shrine dedicated to the Sacred Heart stands to the east, south of the house at Črni Vrh no. 31. It is a doorless chapel-shrine and was built in 1926. There is another shrine in the eastern part of the village, south of the road. This is a chapel-shrine with doors dedicated to Saint Florian, with a fresco depicting the saint. A third shrine, a chapel-shrine with doors, stands near the farm at Črni Vrh no. 2, north of the road. It dates from the end of the 19th century and contains a wooden crucifix. These shrines are registered as cultural monuments.

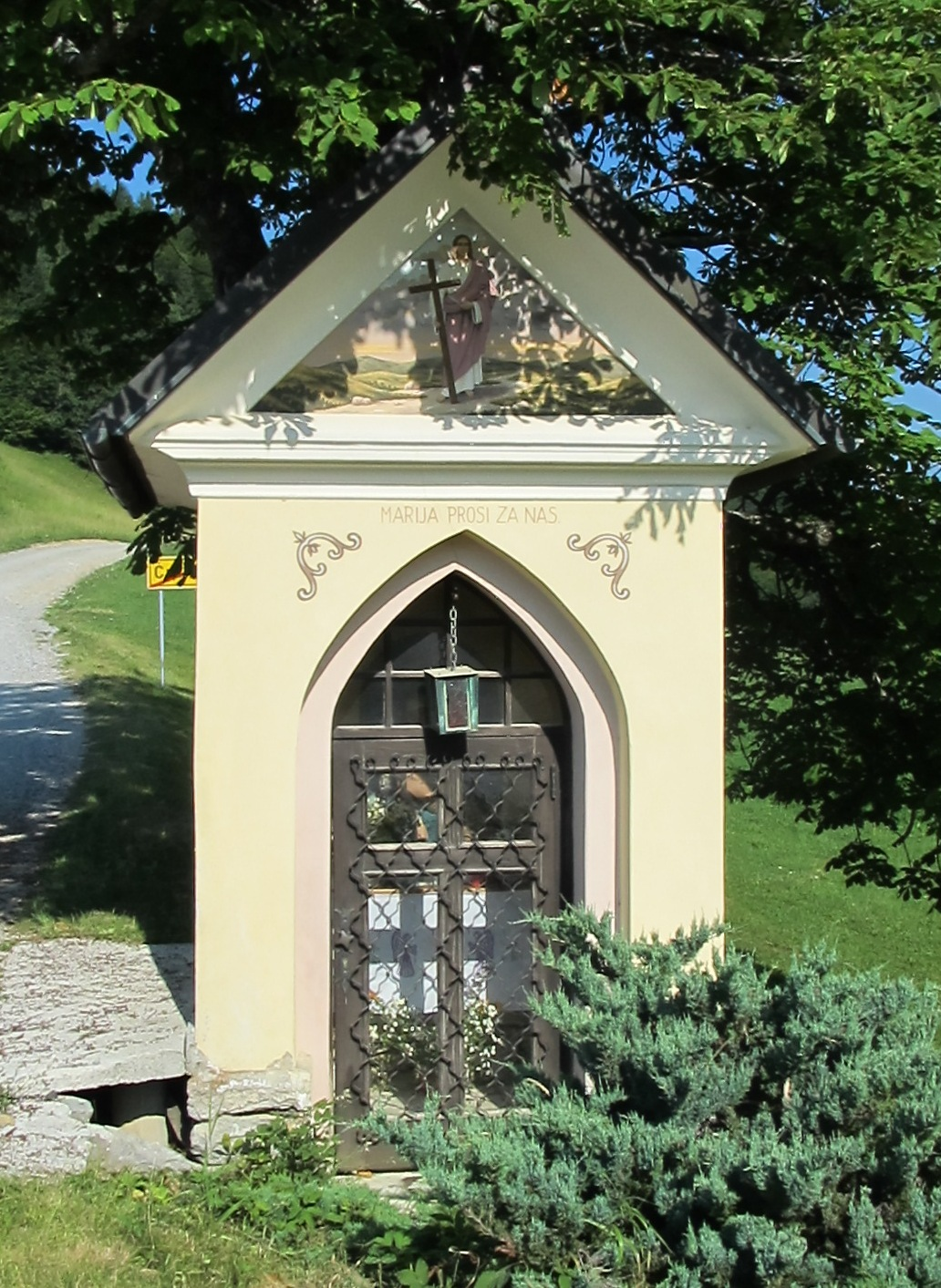
Shrine dedicated to the Virgin Mary

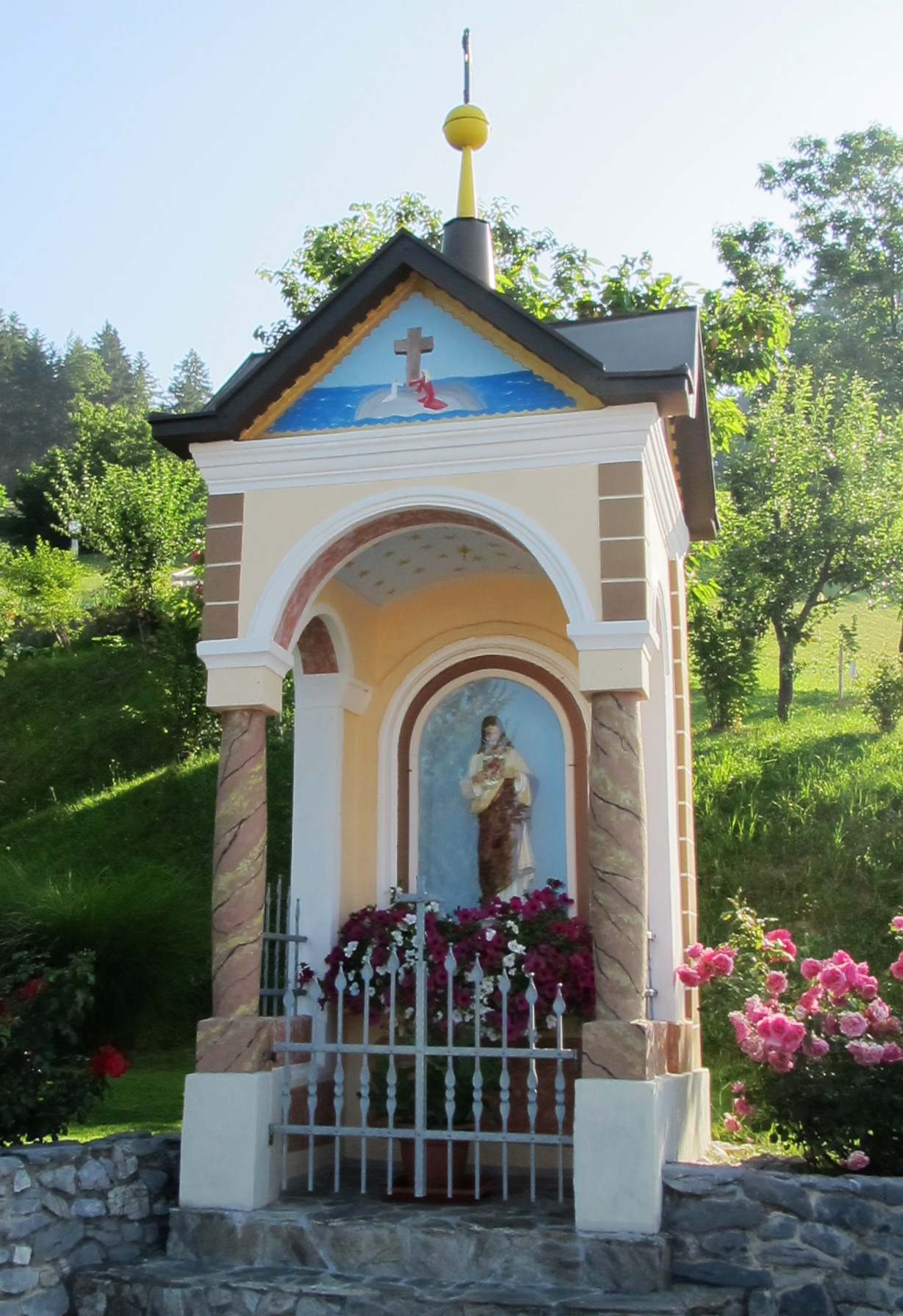
Shrine dedicated to the Sacred Heart

== Other cultural heritage ==
In addition to Saint Leonard's Church and its chapel and shrines, Črni Vrh has several other structures registered as cultural heritage:

- The Church Hill Fort (Gradišče Cerkovni grič) is a small fortification from the late Iron Age.
- The farm at Črni Vrh no. 23 stands apart on a road north of the village. It features a single-story house built above a semi-cellar with a central entryway and extended gable. There is a stone barn built into the slope bearing the year 1863; its upper story has wood construction between stone columns. There is also a double hayrack.
- The house at Črni Vrh no. 2 stands in a hamlet along the main road from Polhov Gradec to Črni Vrh. It is a rectangular structure with a central entryway, covered with a half-hipped roof and concrete roof tiles. The plastering of the facade is segmented, with pilasters in the middle, quoining, and a partial cornice.
- The house at Črni Vrh no. 54 stands along a road in the western part of the village. It is a rectangular single-story structure with a semi-cellar. It has a central entrance with an extended gable, and the year 1847 is carved into the stone door casing. It has a gabled roof with a dormer, the plastering on the facade is segmented, and there are small windows covered with metal lattices.
- The house at Črni Vrh no. 55 stands southwest of the village above the road leading to the Big Božna Valley. This is a single-story stone house with metal lattices on the windows. It has a tiled gabled roof. The gable is made of wood, covered with two levels of boards. The house dates from the mid-19th century and is in ruins.
