= Gerichtsbezirk Oberburg =

Oberburg Court District Gerichtsbezirk Oberburg
- court district
- Country: Austria
- State: Steiermark
- Number of municipalities: Oberberg

Area
  - Total: 509.03 km^{2} (196.54 sq mi)

Population (1910)
  - Total: 15,296
  - Density: 30.049/km^{2} (77.827/sq mi)

The Gerichtsbezirk Oberburg (Court District of Oberberg) (Slovenian: sodni okraj Gornji Grad) was an administrative district in Steiermark. It was composed of part of the Bezirks Cilli (Celje) and became part of Yugoslavia in 1919.

== History ==
The Gerichtsbezirk Oberburg was created by an 1849 decision by the Landes-Gerichts-Einführungs-Kommission (State Court Launch Commission) and originally composed of eight communities: Kokarje (Altenburg), Laufen, Leutsch, Neustift, Oberburg, Praßberg, Rietz and Sulzbach. The Gerichtsbezirk Oberburg was formed in to provide a political decentralization of the judicial administration and since 1868 this district together with the Gerichtsbezirken Cilli, Gonobitz, Franz, Sankt Marein bei Erlachstein and Tüffer of Bezirk Cilli.

The Gerichsbezick had a population of 15,394 in 1890, with 15,371 Slovenians and 18 Germans who spoke a local dialect. There was another census in 1910, which showed that the Gerichtsbezirk had a total population of 15,296, of which 15,217 (99.5%) spoke Slovenian and 56 (0.4%) spoke German.

Due to the border regulations of September 10, 1919 enforced by the Treaty of Saint-Germain, the entirety of the Gerichtsbezirk Oberberg was ceded to the Kingdom of Yugoslavia.

== Circuit Court ==
In 1910, the Gerichtssprengel (circuit court) Oberberg included the ten following communities shortly before its dissolution: Bočna (Wotschna), Gornji Grad (Oberburg), Kokarje (Altenburg), Ljubo (Laufen), Luče (Leutsch), Mozirje Trg (Praßberg), Nova Štifta (Neustift), Rečica (Rietz) und Solčava (Sulzbach).

== Literature ==
- k. k. Statististische Central-Commission (Hrsg.): Special-Orts-Repertorium der im Österreichischen Reichsrathe vertretenen Königreiche und Länder. Neubearbeitung auf Grund der Ergebnisse der Volkszählung vom 31. December 1899. IV. Steiermark. Wien 1893
- k. k. Statististische Zentralkommission (Hrsg.): Spezialortsrepertorium von Steiermark. Bearbeitet auf Grund der Ergebnisse der Volkszählung vom 31. Dezember 1910. Wien 1917
