= Sveti Florjan =

Sveti Florjan may refer to several settlements in Slovenia:

- Florjan pri Gornjem Gradu, known as Sveti Florjan until 1953
- Florjan, Šoštanj, known as Sveti Florjan until 1955
- Sveti Florjan nad Škofjo Loko, known as Sveti Florjan until 1955
