= Kokarje =

- Village
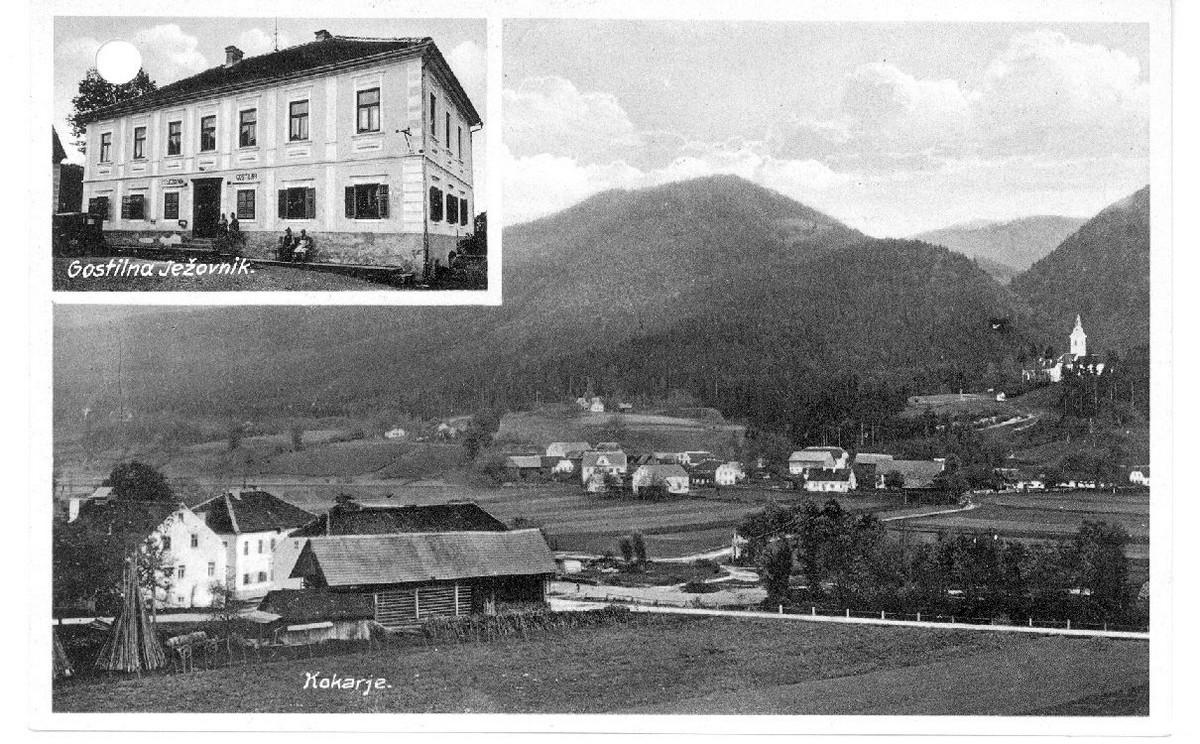
- Postcard of Kokarje

- Location in Slovenia
- Coordinates: 46°18′7.95″N 14°56′25.51″E
- Country: Slovenia
- Traditional region: Styria
- Statistical region: Savinja
- Municipality: Nazarje

Area
  - Total: 1.86 km^{2} (0.72 sq mi)
- Elevation: 361.1 m (1,185 ft)

Population (2002)
  - Total: 185

Kokarje (pronounced [ˈkoːkaɾjɛ]) is a village on the right bank of the Dreta River in the Municipality of Nazarje in Slovenia. The area belongs to the traditional region of Styria and is now included in the Savinja Statistical Region.

The local church, built on a slight elevation south of the settlement, is dedicated to the Virgin Mary and belongs to the Parish of Rečica ob Savinji. It was first mentioned in written documents dating to 1453, but the building was extensively rebuilt in the 17th and 19th centuries.

Historically, Kokarje was known for its black hollowware, as well as other pottery types, although this industry eventually died out. When controlled by the Austro-Hungarian Empire (1867–1918) it was part of the Duchy of Styria and the Court District of Oberberg (German: Gerichtsbezirk Oberburg).
