= Sveti Lenart =

Sveti Lenart may refer to several places in Slovenia:

- Lenart pri Gornjem Gradu, a settlement in the Municipality of Gornji Grad, known as Sveti Lenart until 1955
- Lenart v Slovenskih Goricah, a settlement in the Municipality of Lenart, known as Sveti Lenart until 1952
- Sveti Lenart, Cerklje na Gorenjskem, a settlement in the Municipality of Cerklje na Gorenjskem
- Sveti Lenart, Škofja Loka, a settlement in the Municipality of Škofja Loka
- Vrhe, Trbovlje, a settlement in the Municipality of Trbovlje, known as Sveti Lenart until 1955
