= Trnovec =

Trnovec may refer to:

In Croatia:

- Trnovec Bartolovečki, a village and a municipality in Varaždin County
- Trnovec, Međimurje County, a village near Nedelišće

In Slovakia:

- Trnovec, Slovakia, a village and municipality in the Trnava Region
- Trnovec nad Váhom, a village and municipality in the Nitra Region

In Slovenia:

- Trnovec, Kočevje, a settlement in the Municipality of Kočevje, southern Slovenia
- Trnovec, Medvode, a settlement in the Municipality of Medvode, central Slovenia
- Trnovec, Metlika, a settlement in the Municipality of Metlika, southeastern Slovenia
- Trnovec pri Dramljah, a settlement in the Municipality of Šentjur, eastern Slovenia
- Trnovec pri Slovenski Bistrici, a settlement in the Municipality of Slovenski Bistrici, northeastern Slovenia
- Trnovec, Rečica ob Savinji, a settlement in the Municipality of Rečica ob Savinji, northeastern Slovenia
- Trnovec, Sevnica, a settlement in the Municipality of Sevnica, central Slovenia
- Trnovec, Videm, a settlement in the Municipality of Videm, northeastern Slovenia
