= Dol–Suha =

- Location in Slovenia
- Coordinates: 46°20′37.55″N 14°55′12.39″E
- Country: Slovenia
- Traditional region: Styria
- Statistical region: Savinja
- Municipality: Rečica ob Savinji

Area
  - Total: 4.7 km^{2} (1.8 sq mi)
- Elevation: 435.3 m (1,428 ft)

Population (2002)
  - Total: 172

Dol–Suha (pronounced [ˈdoːu̯ ˈsuːxa]; Slovene: Dol - Suha) is a settlement north of Rečica ob Savinji in Slovenia. It is made up of two smaller settlements, Dol and Suha, hence the hyphenated name. The area belongs to the traditional region of Styria and is now included in the Savinja Statistical Region.
