= Poljane, Rečica ob Savinji =

Poljane
- Location in Slovenia
- Coordinates: 46°19′37.6″N 14°54′32.74″E
- Country: Slovenia
- Traditional region: Styria
- Statistical region: Savinja
- Municipality: Rečica ob Savinji

Area
  - Total: 10.72 km^{2} (4.14 sq mi)
- Elevation: 406.2 m (1,333 ft)

Population (2002)
  - Total: 161

Poljane (pronounced [pɔˈljaːnɛ]) is a dispersed settlement in the hills northwest of Rečica ob Savinji in Slovenia. The area belongs to the traditional Styria region and is now included in the Savinja Statistical Region.

Rudenek Castle, also known locally as Lekše Castle (Slovene: Lekšetov grad), was a 14th-century castle in the eastern part of the settlement. It was expanded in the Renaissance but abandoned and destroyed in the 18th century. Some of the enclosing walls are still visible, and two stories of one of the original towers survives.
