= Homec =

Homec may refer to several places in Slovenia:

- Homec, Domžale, a settlement in the Municipality of Domžale, central Slovenia
- Homec, Kobarid, a settlement in the Municipality of Kobarid, western Slovenia
- Homec, Vojnik, a settlement in the Municipality of Vojnik, northeastern Slovenia
- Homec, Rečica ob Savinji, a settlement in the Municipality of Rečica ob Savinji, northeastern Slovenia
