= Varpolje =

- Location in Slovenia
- Coordinates: 46°18′57.75″N 14°54′28.59″E
- Country: Slovenia
- Traditional region: Styria
- Statistical region: Savinja
- Municipality: Rečica ob Savinji

Area
  - Total: 1.05 km^{2} (0.41 sq mi)
- Elevation: 365.8 m (1,200 ft)

Population (2002)
  - Total: 316

Varpolje (pronounced [ˈʋaːɾpɔljɛ]) is a settlement on the left bank of the Savinja River in the Municipality of Rečica ob Savinji in Slovenia. The area belongs to the traditional Styria region and is now included in the Savinja Statistical Region.
