= Lenart pri Gornjem Gradu =

Lenart pri Gornjem Gradu Sveti Lenart (until 1955)
- Location in Slovenia
- Coordinates: 46°18′15.37″N 14°47′0.94″E
- Country: Slovenia
- Traditional region: Styria
- Statistical region: Savinja
- Municipality: Gornji Grad

Area
  - Total: 13.58 km^{2} (5.24 sq mi)
- Elevation: 509.1 m (1,670 ft)

Population (2020)
  - Total: 112
  - Density: 8.25/km^{2} (21.4/sq mi)

Lenart pri Gornjem Gradu (pronounced [ˈleːnaɾt pɾi ˈɡoːɾnjɛm ˈɡɾaːdu]) is a dispersed settlement in the hills northwest of Gornji Grad in Slovenia. The area belongs to the traditional region of Styria and is now included in the Savinja Statistical Region.

== Name ==
The name of the settlement was changed from Sveti Lenart (literally, 'Saint Leonard') to Lenart pri Gornjem Gradu (literally, 'Leonard near Gornji Grad') in 1955. The name was changed on the basis of the 1948 Law on Names of Settlements and Designations of Squares, Streets, and Buildings as part of efforts by Slovenia's postwar communist government to remove religious elements from toponyms.

== Church ==
The local church, from which the settlement gets its name, is built on a hill in the western part of the settlement. It is dedicated to Saint Leonard and belongs to the Parish of Gornji Grad. It was first mentioned in written documents dating to 1426. It has a rectangular nave with a narrower and lower sanctuary and a southern belfry.
