= Dol, Gornji Grad =

Dol
- Location in Slovenia
- Coordinates: 46°17′15.79″N 14°47′8.64″E
- Country: Slovenia
- Traditional region: Styria
- Statistical region: Savinja
- Municipality: Gornji Grad

Area
  - Total: 1.45 km^{2} (0.56 sq mi)
- Elevation: 455.3 m (1,494 ft)

Population (2020)
  - Total: 23
  - Density: 16/km^{2} (41/sq mi)

Dol (pronounced [ˈdoːl]; formerly: Štajngrob or Štajngrob ob Dreti) is a small settlement in the Upper Dreta Valley in the Municipality of Gornji Grad in Slovenia. The area belongs to the traditional Styria region and is now included in the Savinja Statistical Region.

== Name ==
The name Dol is a common toponym in Slovenia. It is derived from the common noun dol 'small valley', referring to a local geographical feature. Dol was formerly known as Štajngrob or Štajngrob ob Dreti in Slovene. Before the settlement was renamed, Dol was the name of a hamlet of Štajngrob. The older name is derived from German but underwent folk etymology, in which the final element (originally German -grube 'depression, basin') was changed to Slovene -grob 'grave'.

== History ==
The settlement was first mentioned in written sources in 1426, as a hamlet of Tirosek (which became a hamlet of Nova Štifta in 2005).

=== Mass grave ===
Dol is the site of a mass grave from the Second World War. The Ravni 2 Mass Grave (Slovene: Grobišče v Ravneh 2) is located above Dreta Creek, about 150 meters (490 ft) south of the Prodnik farm. Together with the Ravni 1 Mass Grave in neighboring Gornji Grad, it contains the remains of 100 to 200 Slovene civilians executed by the Partisan command of the Fourth Operation Zone in the fall of 1944.

== Church ==
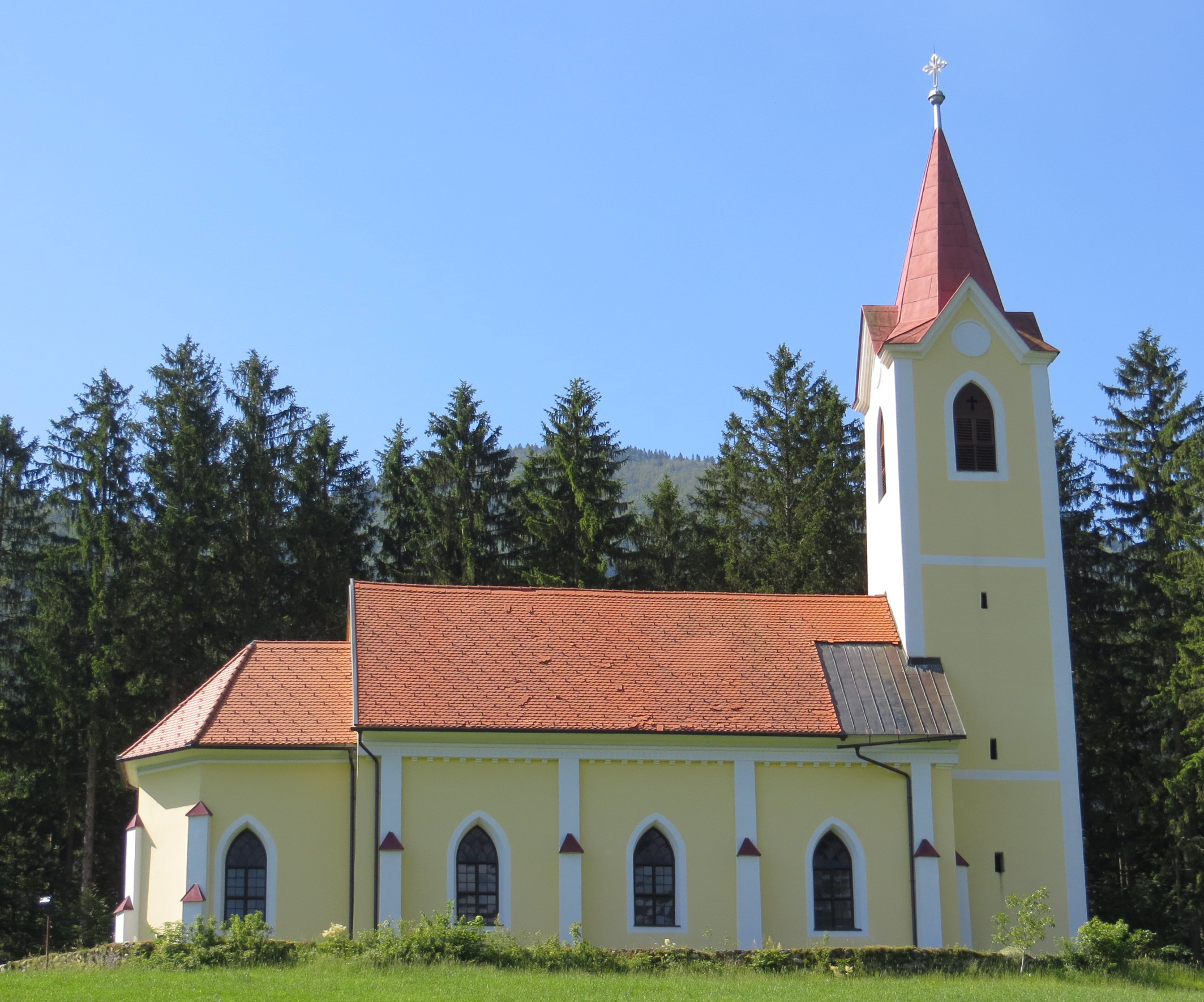
Presentation of Mary Church

A church formerly belonging to Dol became part of the territory of Nova Štifta when that settlement was expanded in 2005. The church stands southwest of Dol, on a small hill between the Dreta River and Mačkovec Creek, and is dedicated to the Presentation of Mary. The church was first mentioned in written sources in 1631. Originally built in the Gothic style, it was completely remodeled in 1868 and again between 1870 and 1873.
