= Grušovlje =

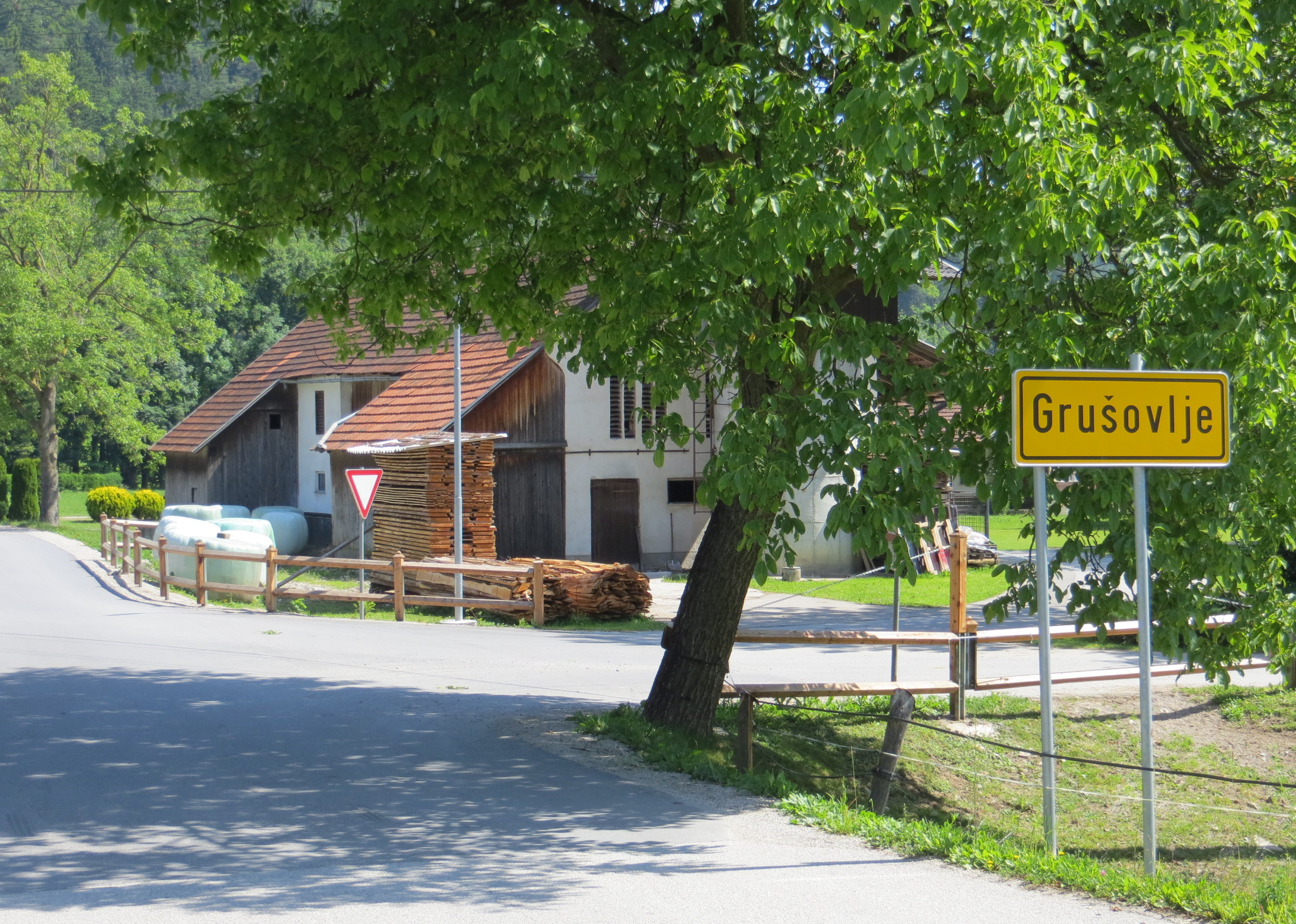

- Location in Slovenia
- Coordinates: 46°18′58.64″N 14°52′55.1″E
- Country: Slovenia
- Traditional region: Styria
- Statistical region: Savinja
- Municipality: Rečica ob Savinji

Area
  - Total: 1.16 km^{2} (0.45 sq mi)
- Elevation: 380 m (1,250 ft)

Population (2002)
  - Total: 77

Grušovlje (pronounced [ɡɾuˈʃoːu̯ljɛ]) is a settlement on the left bank of the Savinja River in the Municipality of Rečica ob Savinji in Slovenia. The area belongs to the traditional region of Styria and is now included in the Savinja Statistical Region.
