= Florjan pri Gornjem Gradu =

Florjan pri Gornjem Gradu Sveti Florjan (until 1953)
- Location in Slovenia
- Coordinates: 46°19′15.78″N 14°48′34.67″E
- Country: Slovenia
- Traditional region: Styria
- Statistical region: Savinja
- Municipality: Gornji Grad

Area
  - Total: 11.35 km^{2} (4.38 sq mi)
- Elevation: 775.1 m (2,543 ft)

Population (2020)
  - Total: 159
  - Density: 14.0/km^{2} (36.3/sq mi)

Florjan pri Gornjem Gradu (pronounced [flɔˈɾjaːm pɾi ˈɡoːɾnjɛm ˈɡɾaːdu]) is a settlement in the hills north and east of Gornji Grad in Slovenia. The area belongs to the traditional region of Styria and is now included in the Savinja statistical region.

== Name ==
The name of the settlement was changed from Sveti Florjan (literally, 'Saint Florian') to Florjan pri Gornjem Gradu (literally, 'Florian near Gornji Grad') in 1953. The name was changed on the basis of the 1948 Law on Names of Settlements and Designations of Squares, Streets, and Buildings as part of efforts by Slovenia's postwar communist government to remove religious elements from toponyms.

== Church ==
The local church is built on a hill in the south of the settlement overlooking Gornji Grad and is dedicated to Saints Primus and Felician and belongs to the Parish of Gornji Grad. It is a single-nave originally Romanesque building with an added sanctuary and a Baroque chapel and belfry.
