= Nizka =

Nizka Nizka vas (until 1953)
- Location in Slovenia
- Coordinates: 46°18′56.49″N 14°55′6.93″E
- Country: Slovenia
- Traditional region: Styria
- Statistical region: Savinja
- Municipality: Rečica ob Savinji

Area
  - Total: 0.77 km^{2} (0.30 sq mi)
- Elevation: 360.5 m (1,183 ft)

Population (2002)
  - Total: 163

Nizka (pronounced [ˈniːska]) is a settlement on the left bank of the Savinja River in the Municipality of Rečica ob Savinji in Slovenia. The area belongs to the traditional Styria region and is now included in the Savinja Statistical Region.

== Name ==
The name of the settlement was changed from Nizka vas to Nizka in 1953.
