= Zgornje Pobrežje =

- Location in Slovenia
- Coordinates: 46°18′26.33″N 14°54′24.44″E
- Country: Slovenia
- Traditional region: Styria
- Statistical region: Savinja
- Municipality: Rečica ob Savinji

Area
  - Total: 1.39 km^{2} (0.54 sq mi)
- Elevation: 375.1 m (1,231 ft)

Population (2002)
  - Total: 104

Zgornje Pobrežje (pronounced [ˈzɡoːɾnjɛ pɔˈbɾeːʒjɛ]) is a settlement on the right bank of the Savinja River in the Municipality of Rečica ob Savinji in Slovenia. The area belongs to the traditional Styria region and is now included in the Savinja Statistical Region.
