= Šentjanž, Rečica ob Savinji =

Šentjanž Šent Janž (until 1955)
- Location in Slovenia
- Coordinates: 46°19′1.28″N 14°53′43.24″E
- Country: Slovenia
- Traditional region: Styria
- Statistical region: Savinja
- Municipality: Rečica ob Savinji

Area
  - Total: 2.05 km^{2} (0.79 sq mi)
- Elevation: 374.9 m (1,230 ft)

Population (2002)
  - Total: 224

Šentjanž (pronounced [ʃɛnˈtjaːnʃ] or [ʃənˈtjaːnʃ]) is a village on the left bank of the Savinja River in the Municipality of Rečica ob Savinji in Slovenia. The area belongs to the traditional Styria region and is now included in the Savinja Statistical Region.

== Name ==
The name of the settlement was changed from Šent Janž (literally, 'Saint John') to Šentjanž in 1955.

== Church ==
The local church is dedicated to John the Baptist and belongs to the Parish of Rečica ob Savinji. It has a rectangular nave with two chapels, a sanctuary, and a northern belfry. It was first mentioned in written documents dating to 1347 with 17th-, 18th-, and 19th-century additions.
