= Spodnja Rečica =

- Location in Slovenia
- Coordinates: 46°18′57.49″N 14°55′51.33″E
- Country: Slovenia
- Traditional region: Styria
- Statistical region: Savinja
- Municipality: Rečica ob Savinji

Area
  - Total: 1.34 km^{2} (0.52 sq mi)
- Elevation: 351.9 m (1,155 ft)

Population (2002)
  - Total: 254

Spodnja Rečica (pronounced [ˈspoːdnja ɾɛˈtʃiːtsa]) is a settlement on the banks of the Savinja River in the Municipality of Rečica ob Savinji in Slovenia. The area belongs to the traditional Styria region and is now included in the Savinja Statistical Region.
