= Municipality of Rečica ob Savinji =

Municipality of Slovenia

Municipality of Rečica ob Savinji Občina Rečica ob Savinji
- Municipality
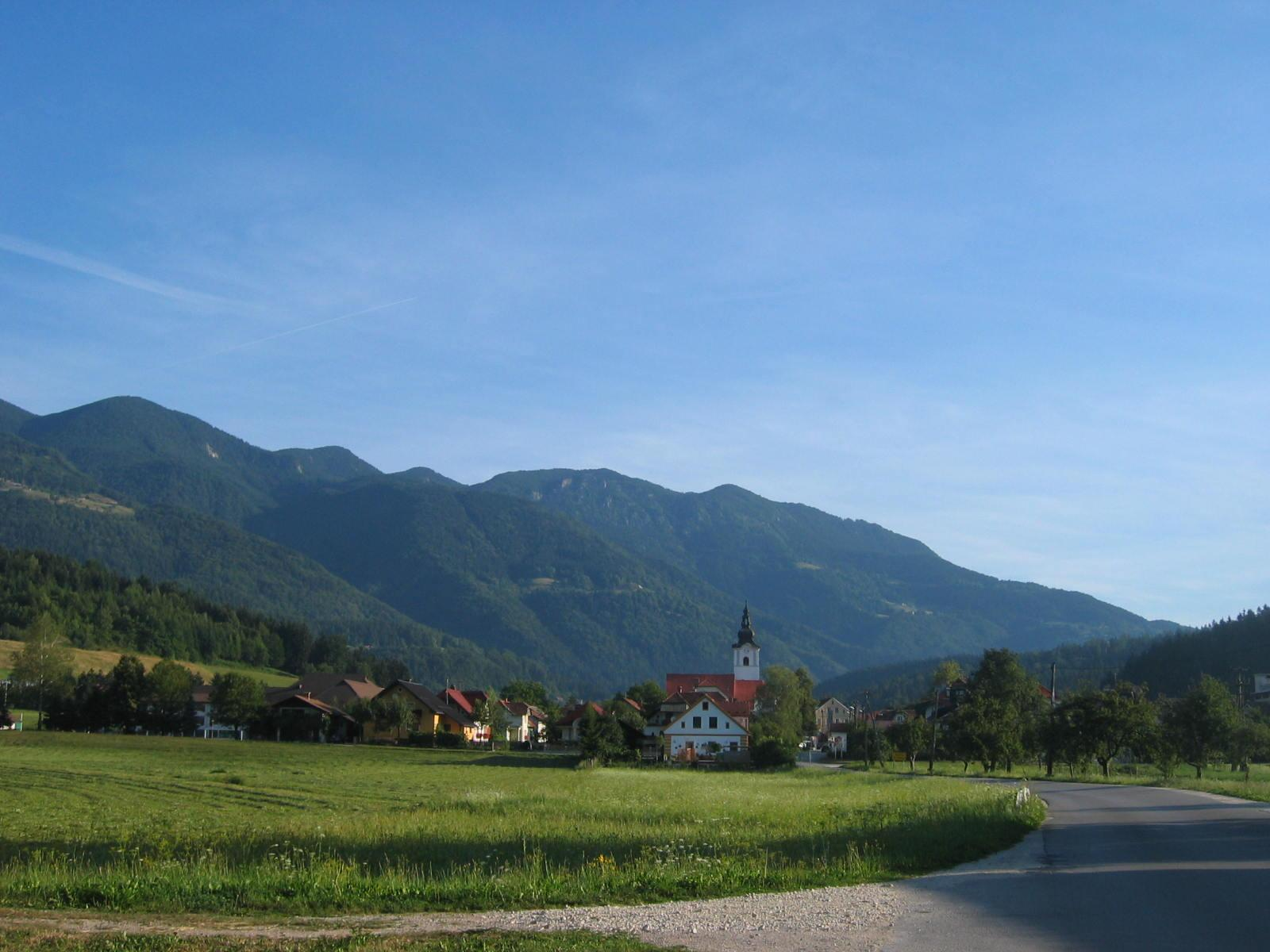

- Location of the Municipality of Rečica ob Savinji in Slovenia
- Coordinates: 46°20′N 14°54′E
- Country: Slovenia

Government
  - Mayor: Ana Rebernik

Area
  - Total: 30.1 km^{2} (11.6 sq mi)

Population (July 1, 2018)
  - Total: 2,279
  - Density: 75.7/km^{2} (196/sq mi)
- Time zone: UTC+01 (CET)
  - Summer (DST): UTC+02 (CEST)
- Website: www.obcina-recica.si

The Municipality of Rečica ob Savinji (pronounced [ɾɛˈtʃiːtsa ɔp saˈʋiːnji]; Slovene: Občina Rečica ob Savinji) is a municipality in the traditional region of Styria in northeastern Slovenia. The seat of the municipality is the town of Rečica ob Savinji. Rečica ob Savinji became a municipality in 2006.

== Settlements ==
In addition to the municipal seat of Rečica ob Savinji, the municipality also includes the following settlements:

- Dol–Suha
- Grušovlje
- Homec
- Nizka
- Poljane
- Spodnja Rečica
- Spodnje Pobrežje
- Šentjanž
- Trnovec
- Varpolje
- Zgornje Pobrežje
