= Sveti Florijan nad Škofjo Loko =

Sveti Florijan nad Škofjo Loko Sveti Florjan (until 1955), Florjan nad Zmincem (1955–2002)
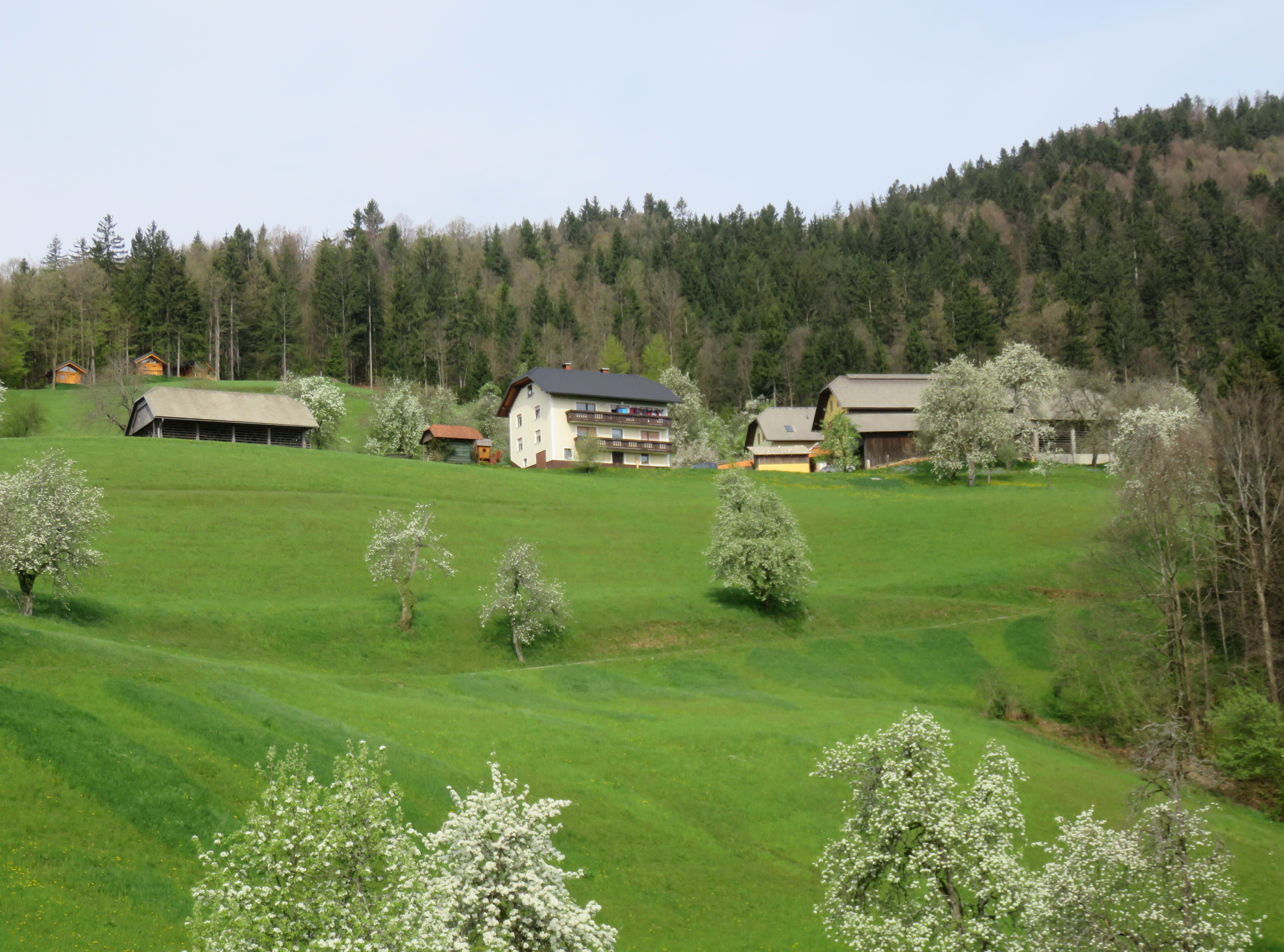

- Location in Slovenia
- Coordinates: 46°9′6.56″N 14°14′14.29″E
- Country: Slovenia
- Traditional region: Upper Carniola
- Statistical region: Upper Carniola
- Municipality: Škofja Loka

Area
  - Total: 1.91 km^{2} (0.74 sq mi)
- Elevation: 619.7 m (2,033 ft)

Population (2002)
  - Total: 27

Sveti Florijan nad Škofjo Loko (pronounced [ˈsʋeːti flɔɾˈjaːn nat ˈʃkoːfjɔ ˈloːkɔ]; in older sources also Sveti Florjan, German: Sankt Florian) is a small settlement in the Municipality of Škofja Loka in the Upper Carniola region of Slovenia. The church of Saint Florian on a hill above the village, though actually belonging to the neighbouring village of Sopotnica, gave its name to the settlement.

== Name ==
The name of the settlement was changed from Sveti Florjan (literally, 'Saint Florian') to Florjan na Zmincem (literally, 'Florian above Zminec') in 1955. The name was changed on the basis of the 1948 Law on Names of Settlements and Designations of Squares, Streets, and Buildings as part of efforts by Slovenia's postwar communist government to remove religious elements from toponyms. The name was changed again in 2002 to Sveti Florijan nad Škofjo Loko. In the past the German name was Sankt Florian.
