= Municipality of Gornji Grad =

Municipality of Slovenia

Municipality of Gornji Grad Občina Gornji Grad
- Municipality
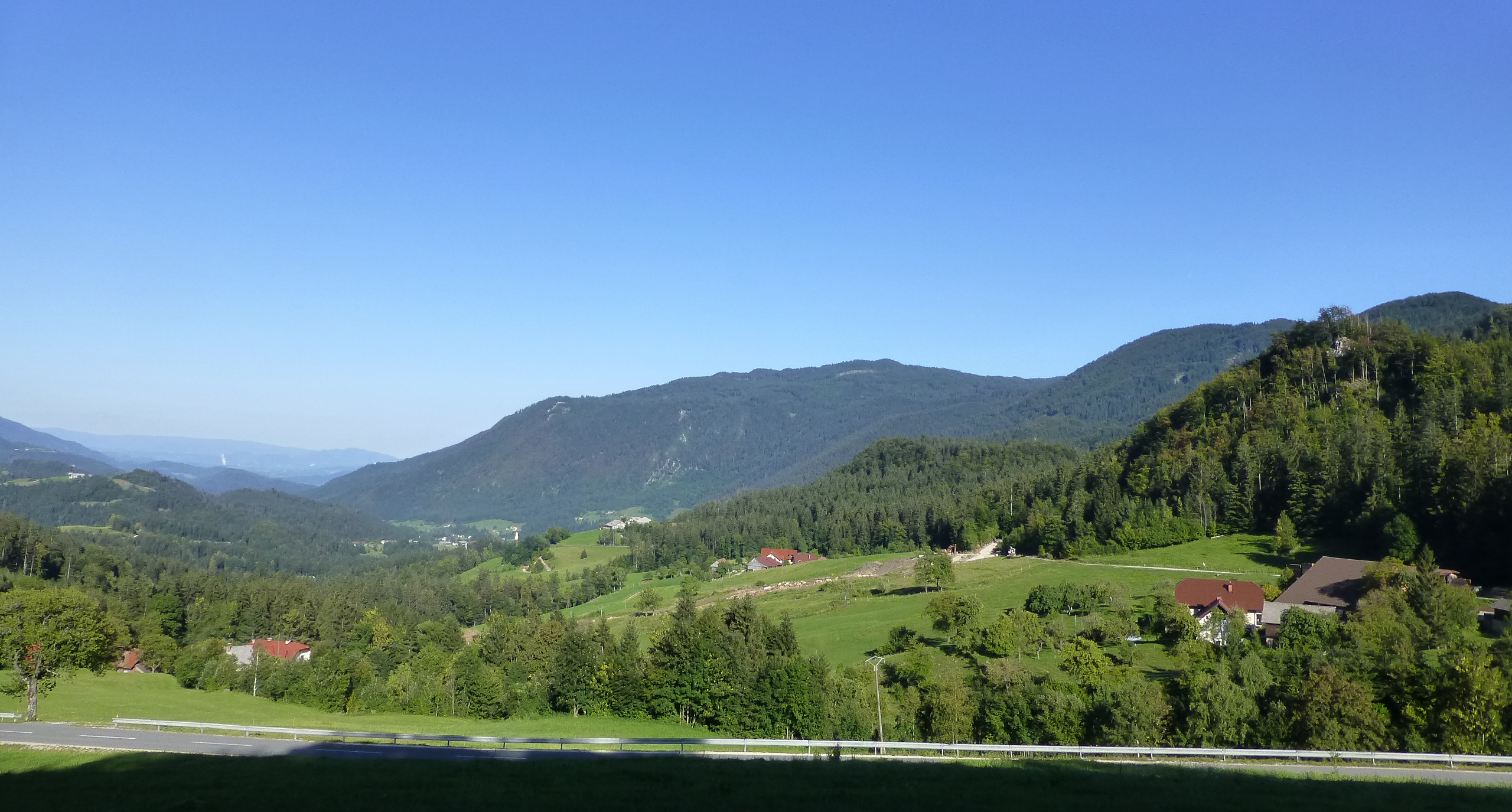

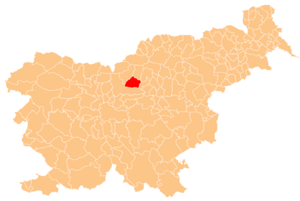
- Location of the Municipality of Gornji Grad in Slovenia
- Coordinates: 46°18′N 14°48′E
- Country: Slovenia

Government
  - Mayor: Anton Špeh (Independent)

Area
  - Total: 90.1 km^{2} (34.8 sq mi)

Population (2002)
  - Total: 2,595
  - Density: 28.8/km^{2} (74.6/sq mi)
- Time zone: UTC+01 (CET)
  - Summer (DST): UTC+02 (CEST)
- Website: www.gornji-grad.si

The Municipality of Gornji Grad (pronounced [ˈɡoːɾnji ˈɡɾaːt]; Slovene: Občina Gornji Grad) is a municipality in Slovenia. The seat of the municipality is the town of Gornji Grad. It lies on the Dreta River in the foothills of the Savinja Alps. Traditionally it belonged to the region of Styria and it is now included in the Savinja Statistical Region.

== Settlements ==
In addition to the municipal seat of Gornji Grad, the municipality also includes the following settlements:

- Bočna
- Dol
- Florjan pri Gornjem Gradu
- Lenart pri Gornjem Gradu
- Nova Štifta
