= Bočna =

- Village
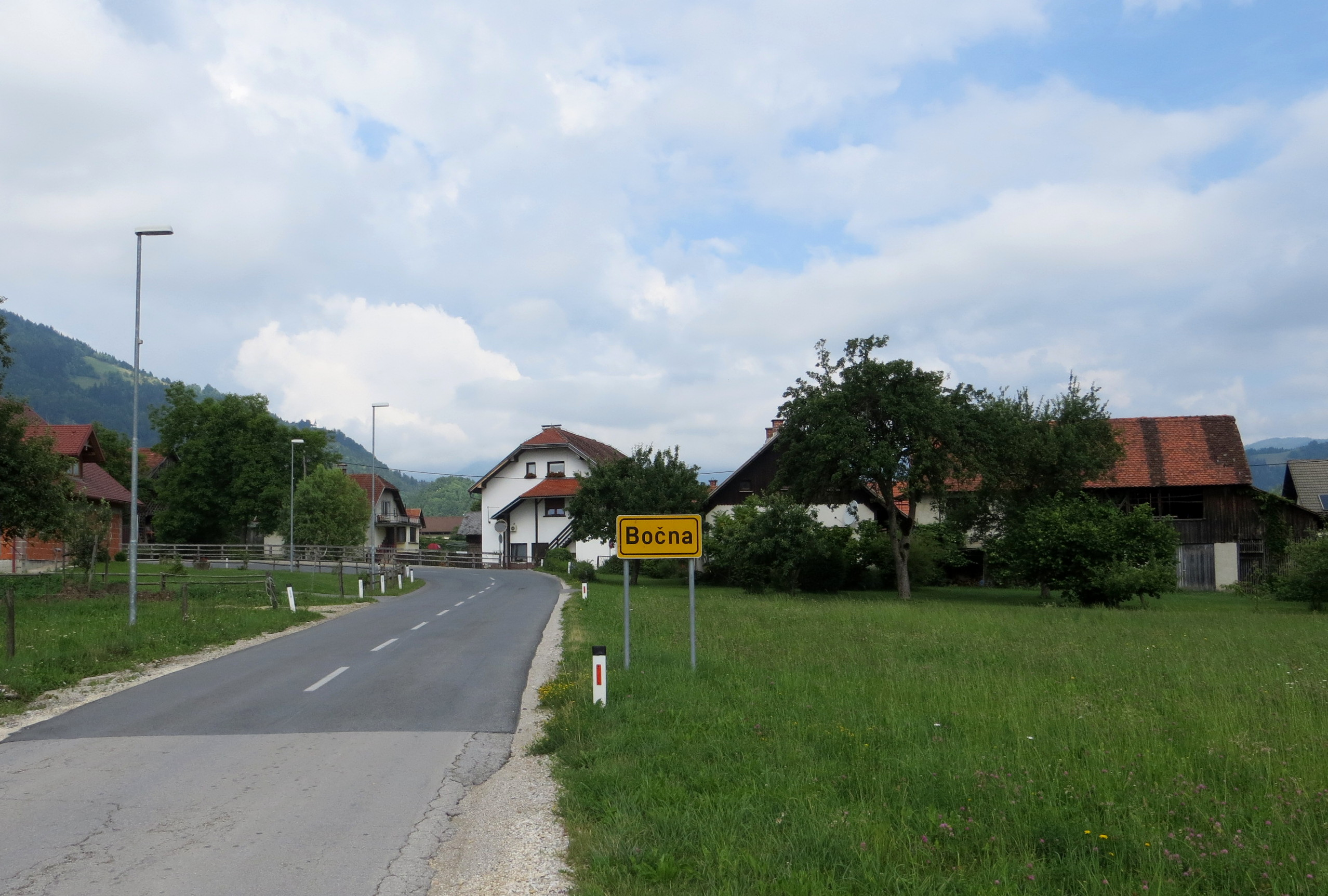

- Location in Slovenia
- Coordinates: 46°17′19.08″N 14°51′8.78″E
- Country: Slovenia
- Traditional region: Styria
- Statistical region: Savinja
- Municipality: Gornji Grad

Area
  - Total: 18.68 km^{2} (7.21 sq mi)
- Elevation: 421.7 m (1,384 ft)

Population (2020)
  - Total: 573
  - Density: 30.7/km^{2} (79.4/sq mi)

Bočna (pronounced [ˈboːtʃna]) is a settlement in the Municipality of Gornji Grad in Slovenia. The area belongs to the traditional region of Styria and is now included in the Savinja Statistical Region. The settlement includes the hamlets of Čeplje, Delce, Kropa, Nadbočna, Otok, Podhom, Poglednik, and Slatina.

== Name ==
Bočna was attested in written sources in 1231 as Vöcen (and as Vözzen in 1247 and Vössen in 1361). The name is probably derived from *Bočьna (vьsь) 'Bok's village', derived from the Slavic personal name Bokъ and thus referring to an early inhabitant of the place. It is unlikely that the name is derived from the common noun boč 'mound-shaped elevation' because names formed with the historical suffix *-ьna were generally based on personal names.

== Church ==
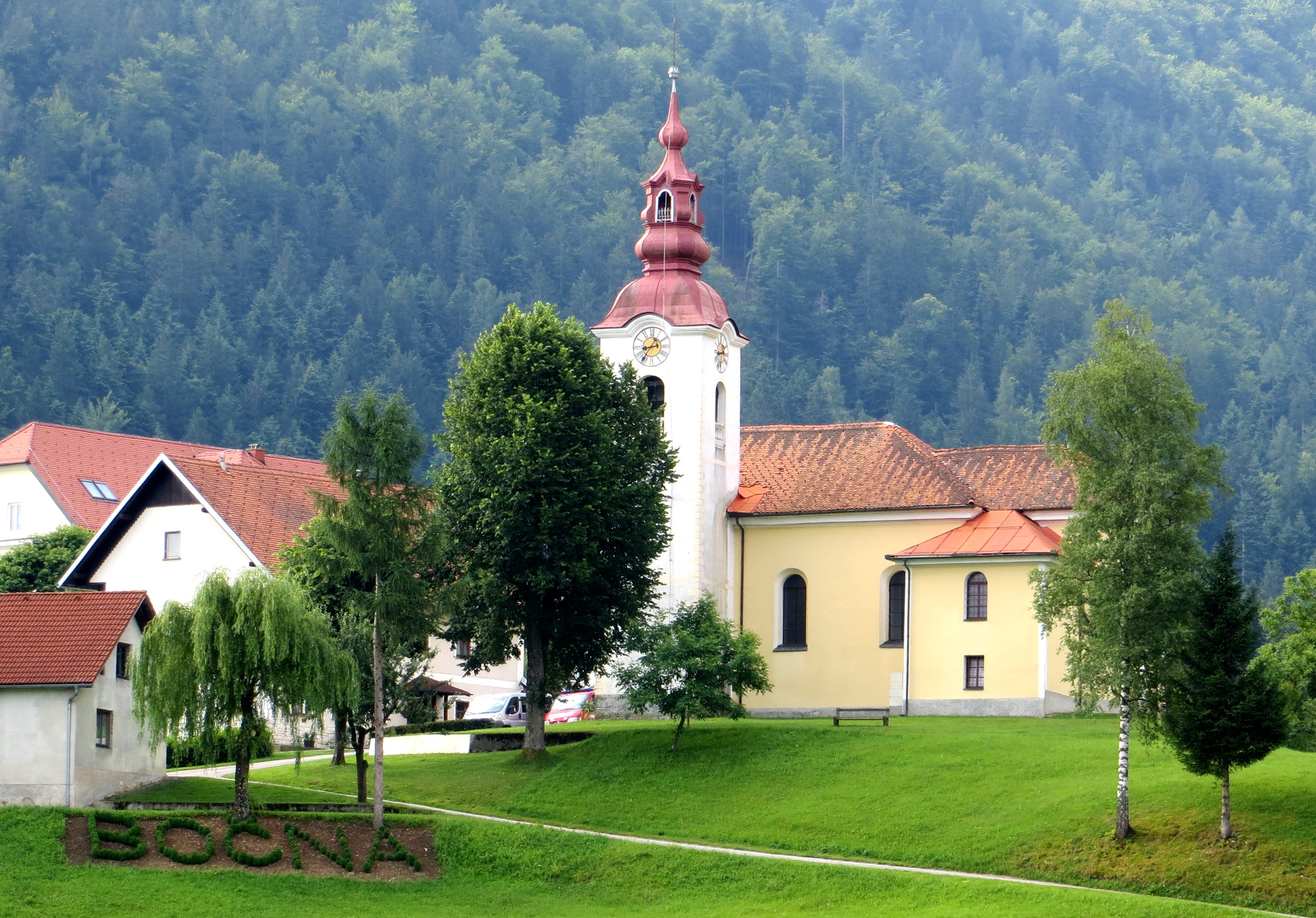
Saint Peter's Church

The local parish church is dedicated to Saint Peter and belongs to the Roman Catholic Diocese of Celje. It was first mentioned in written documents dating to 1426 but was greatly rebuilt in the mid-19th century.

== Gallery ==
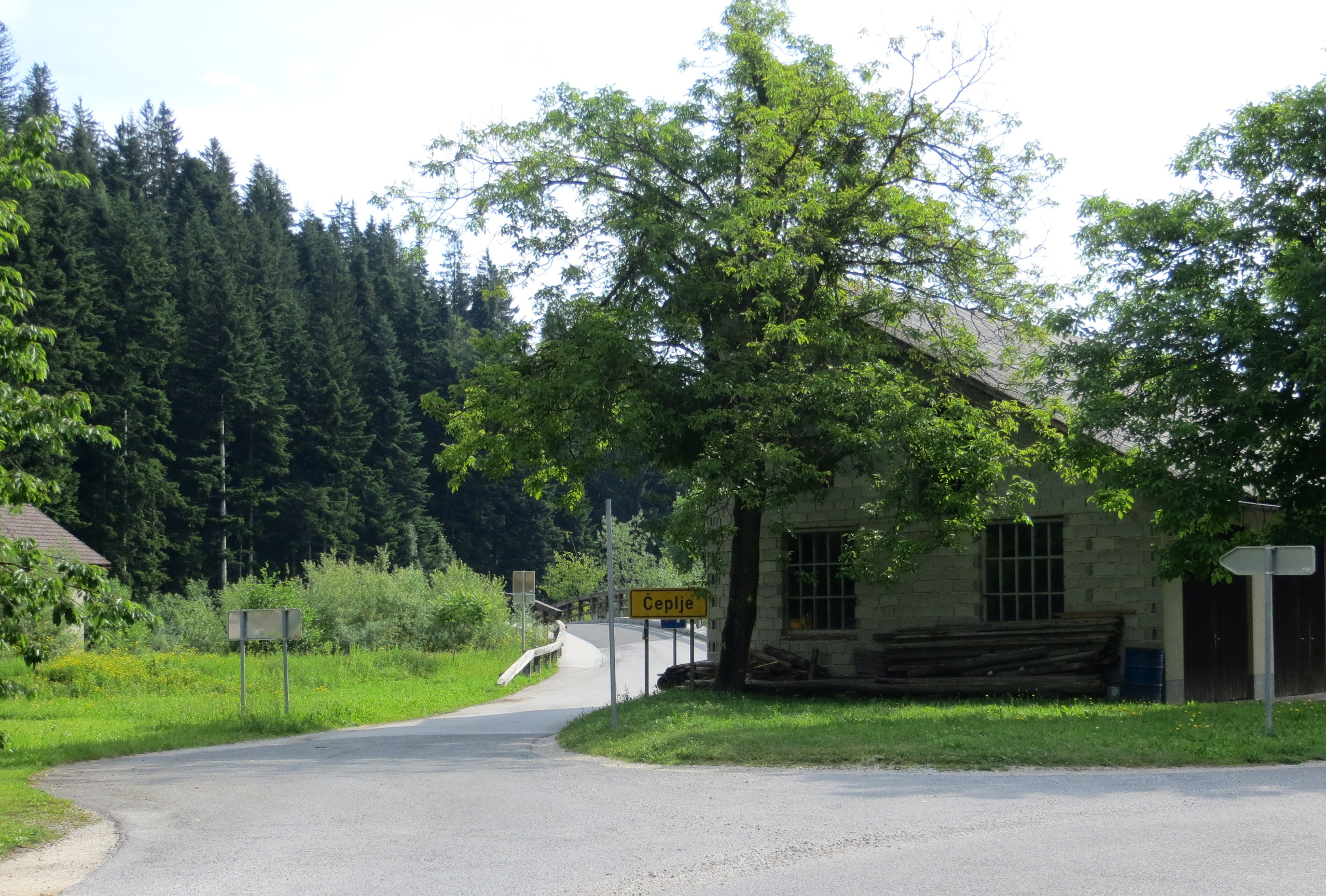
The hamlet of Čeplje

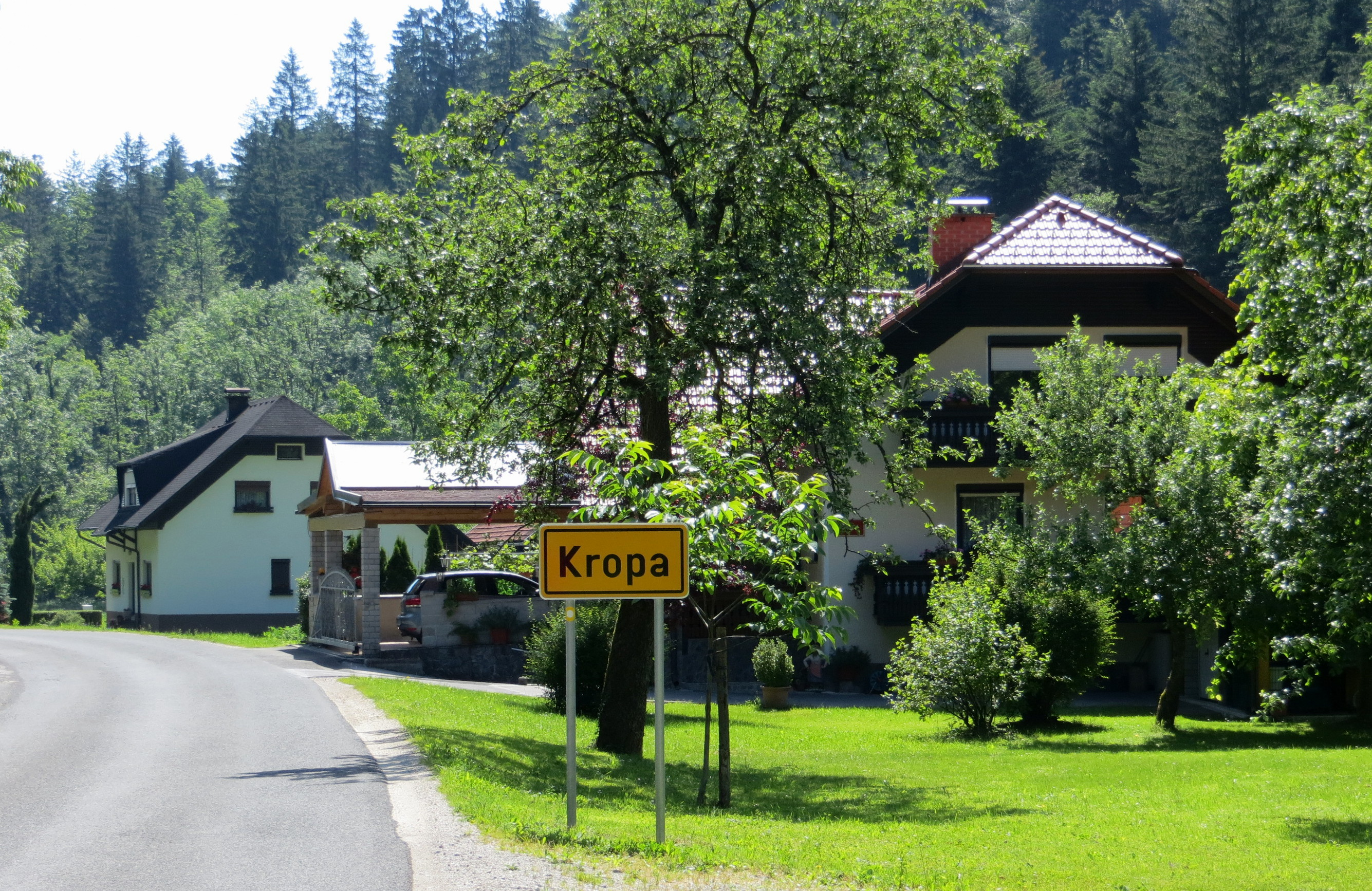
The hamlet of Kropa

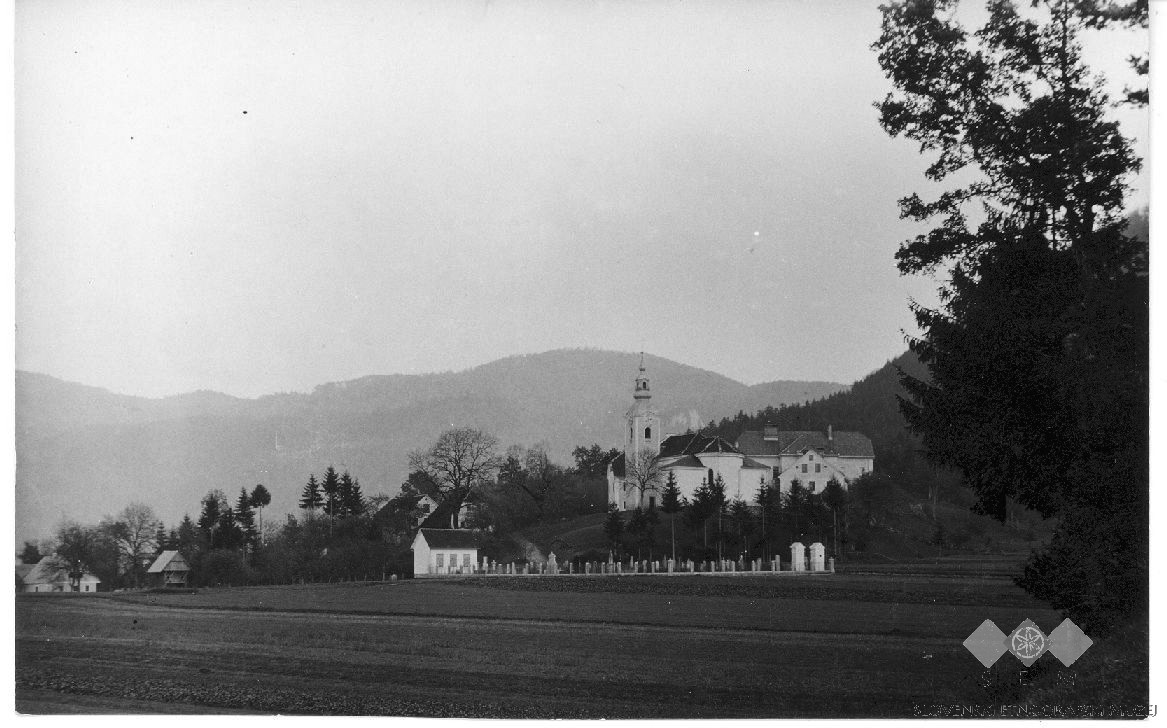
Historical postcard of Bočna
