= Homec, Rečica ob Savinji =

Homec
- Location in Slovenia
- Coordinates: 46°18′34.65″N 14°52′33.18″E
- Country: Slovenia
- Traditional region: Styria
- Statistical region: Savinja
- Municipality: Rečica ob Savinji

Area
  - Total: 3 km^{2} (1.2 sq mi)
- Elevation: 419.7 m (1,377 ft)

Population (2002)
  - Total: 99

Homec (pronounced [ˈxɔːməts], German: Homitz) is a settlement above the right bank of the Savinja River in the Municipality of Rečica ob Savinji in Slovenia. The area belongs to the traditional Styria region and is now included in the Savinja Statistical Region.

The Lešje manor house in the settlement was first mentioned in written documents dating to the 14th century. In the early 20th century the original L-shaped building was converted into a rectangular structure with a steep roof. Some of the original Baroque wall paintings are preserved on the exterior.
