= Nova Štifta, Gornji Grad =

Nova Štifta
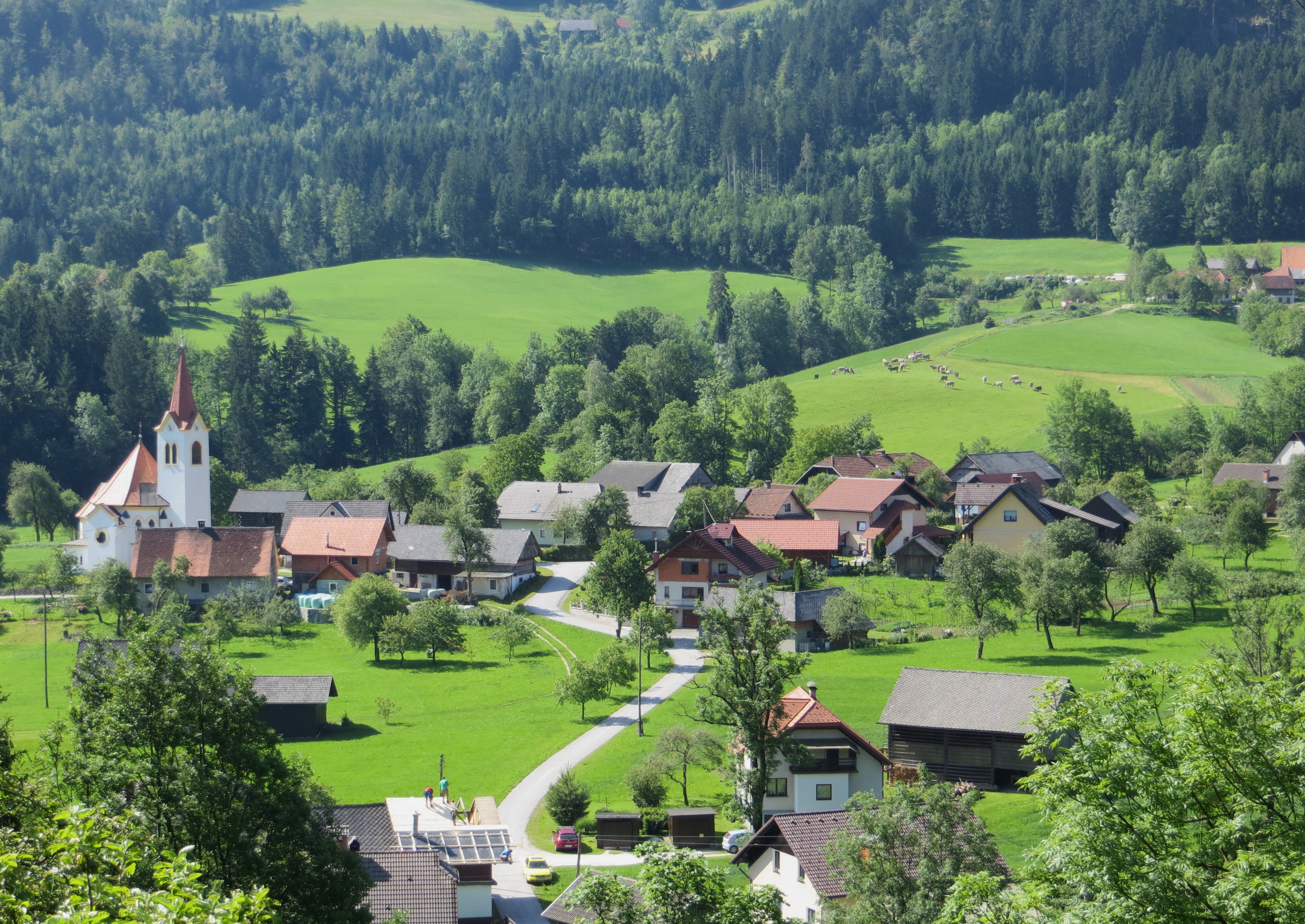
- The hamlet of Šmiklavž in Nova Štifta

- Location in Slovenia
- Coordinates: 46°16′45.6″N 14°46′34.66″E
- Country: Slovenia
- Traditional region: Styria
- Statistical region: Savinja
- Municipality: Gornji Grad

Area
  - Total: 34.09 km^{2} (13.16 sq mi)
- Elevation: 476.1 m (1,562 ft)

Population (2024)
  - Total: 593
  - Density: 17.4/km^{2} (45.1/sq mi)

Nova Štifta (pronounced [ˈnoːʋa ˈʃtiːfta]) is a settlement in the Upper Dreta Valley in the Municipality of Gornji Grad in Slovenia. It is made up of three hamlets: Šmiklavž, Tirosek, and Zgornji Dol (formerly known as Štajngrob). The area belongs to the traditional region of Styria and is now included in the Savinja Statistical Region.

== History ==
Nova Štifta was formally established as an independent settlement in 2005, when it was separated from the territory of Dol and combined with the former settlements of Tirosek and Šmiklavž.

== Churches ==
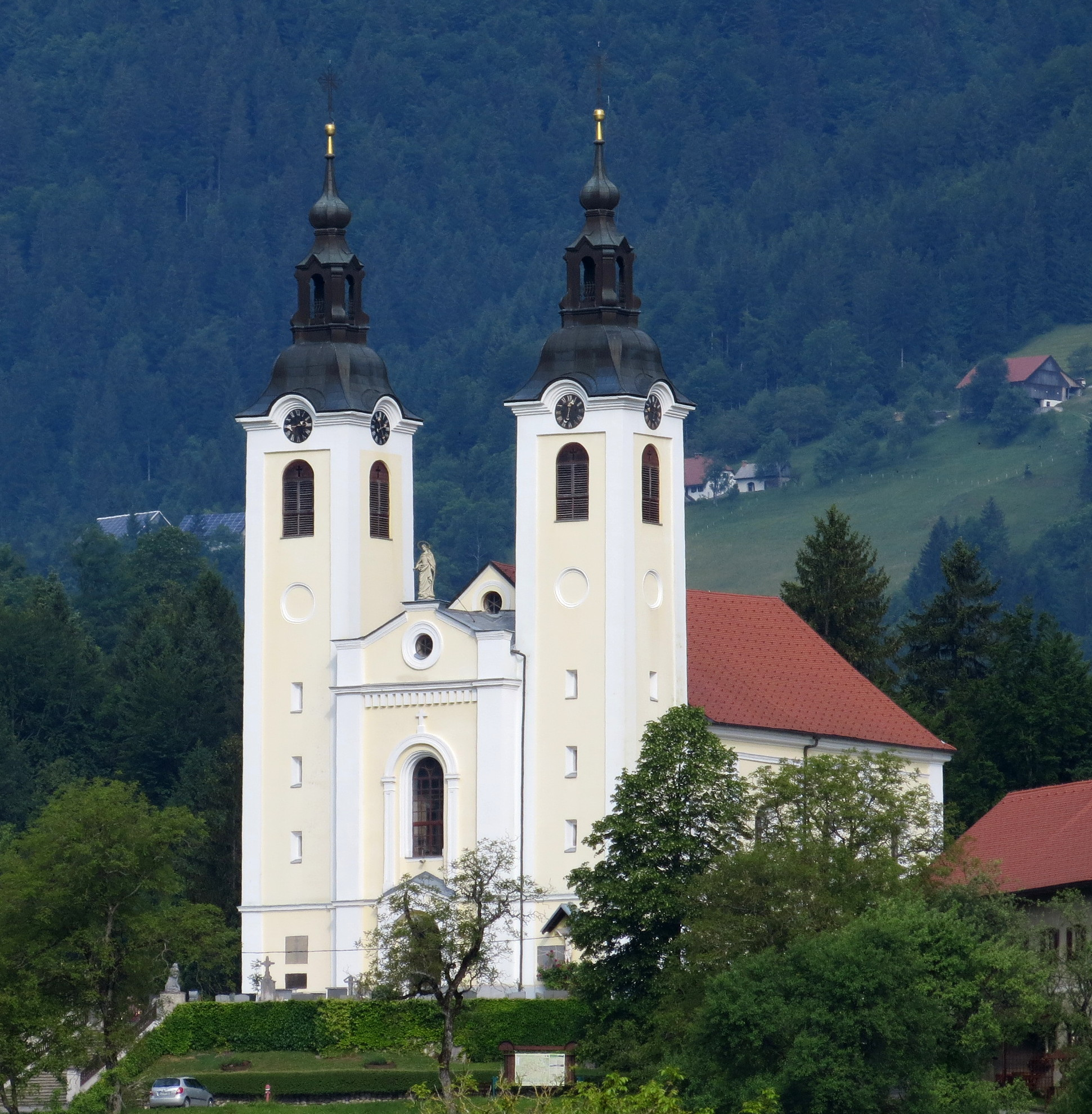
Our Lady, Star of the Sea Church

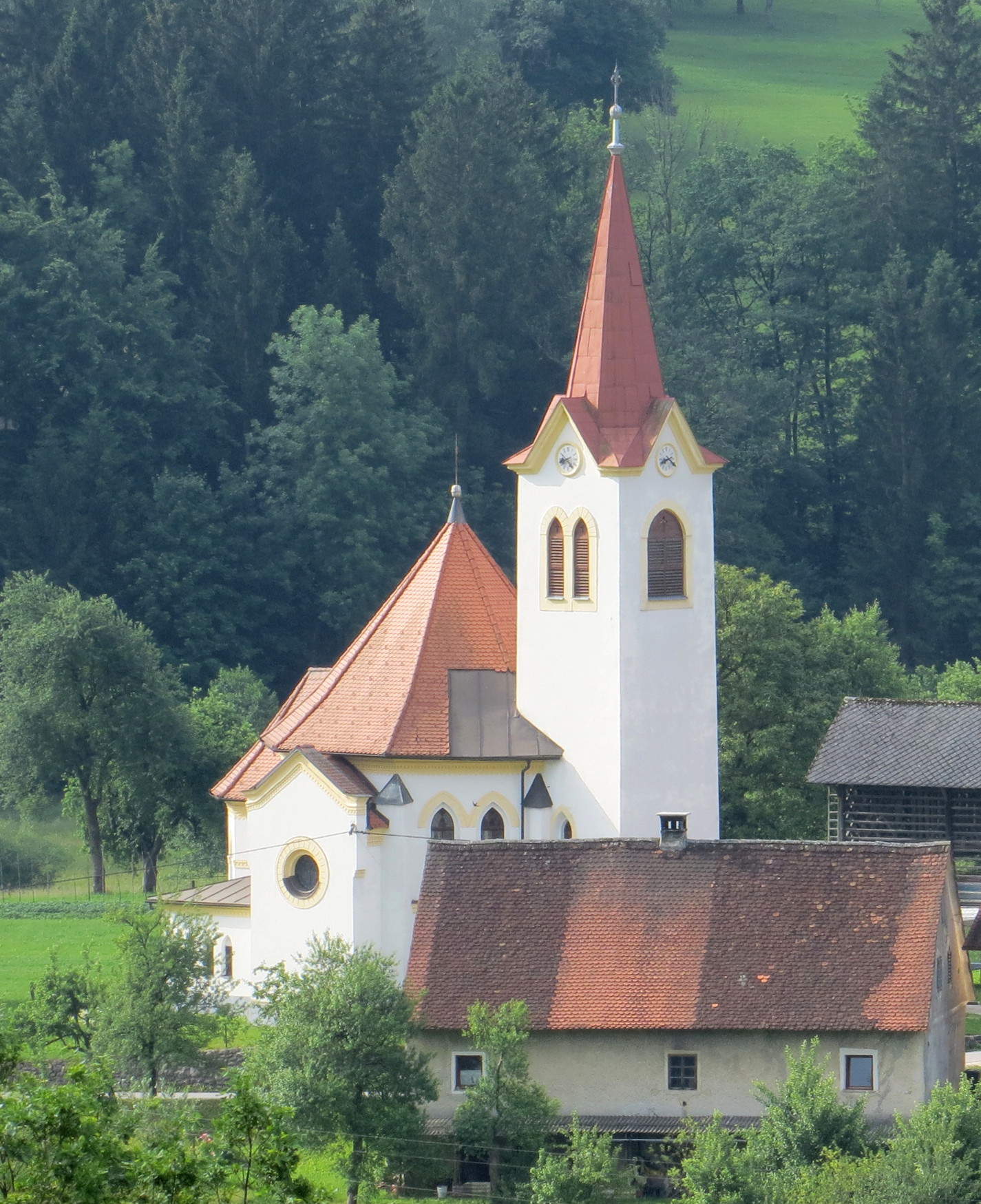
Saint Nicholas's Church

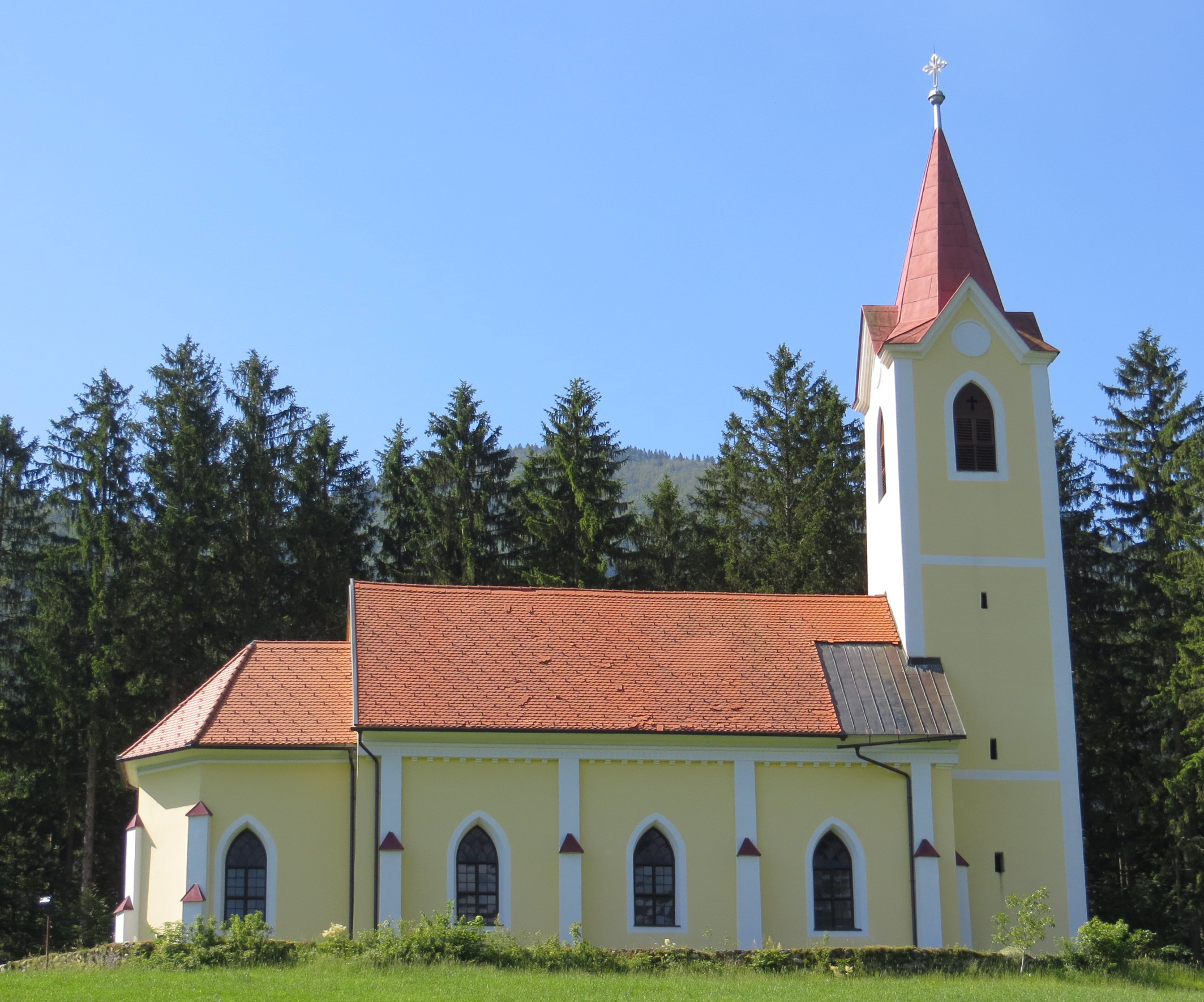
Presentation of Mary Church

Churches in Nova Štifta

The parish church in the settlement is a popular pilgrimage church. It is known as Our Lady, Star of the Sea Church (Slovene: Cerkev sv. Marije Zvezde) and belongs to the Roman Catholic Diocese of Celje. It has a large nave with three chapels on either side and two belfries on its western facade. It was built until 1854 by the master builder Matej Medved on the site of a former three-nave Renaissance church, which burned in a fire in 1850. A second church in the hamlet of Šmiklavž is dedicated to Saint Nicholas. It is octagonal in its floor plan with an added belfry and two rectangular chapels. It was built between 1869 and 1872. The third church stands in Zgornji Dol and is dedicated to the Presentation of Mary. It was erected in the early 16th century and redesigned in the 19th century.

== Gallery ==
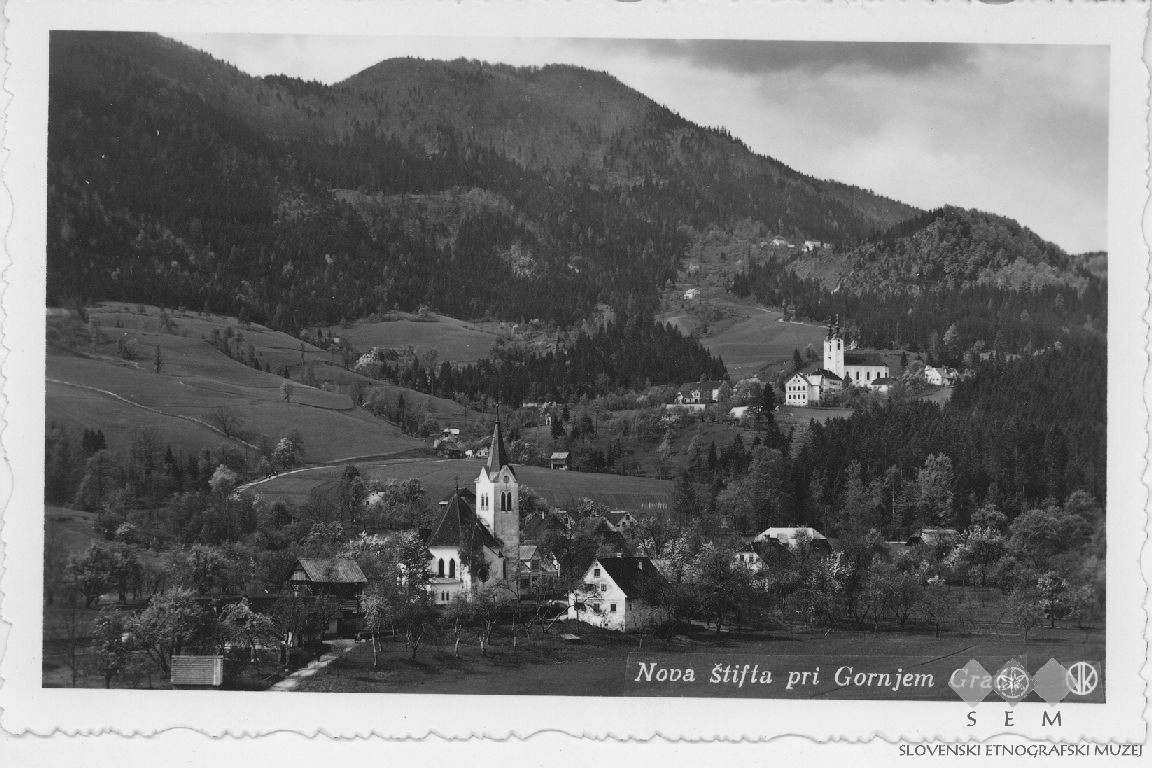
Historical postcard of Nova Štifta

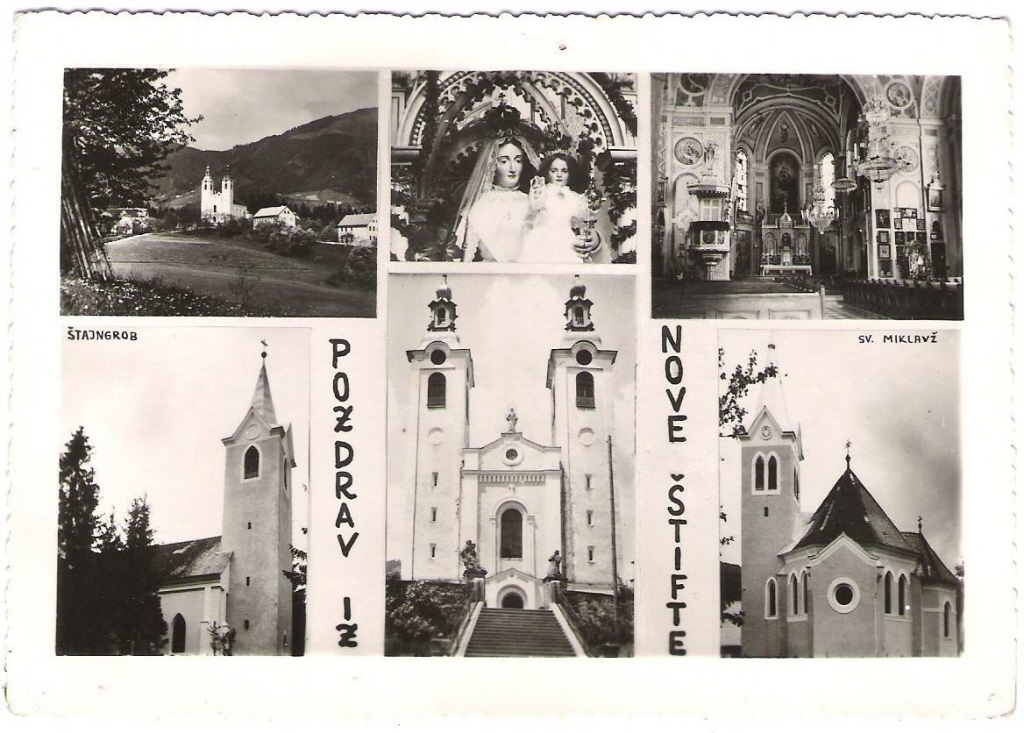
Historical postcard of churches in Nova Štifta
