= Gornji Grad, Slovenia =

Gornji Grad
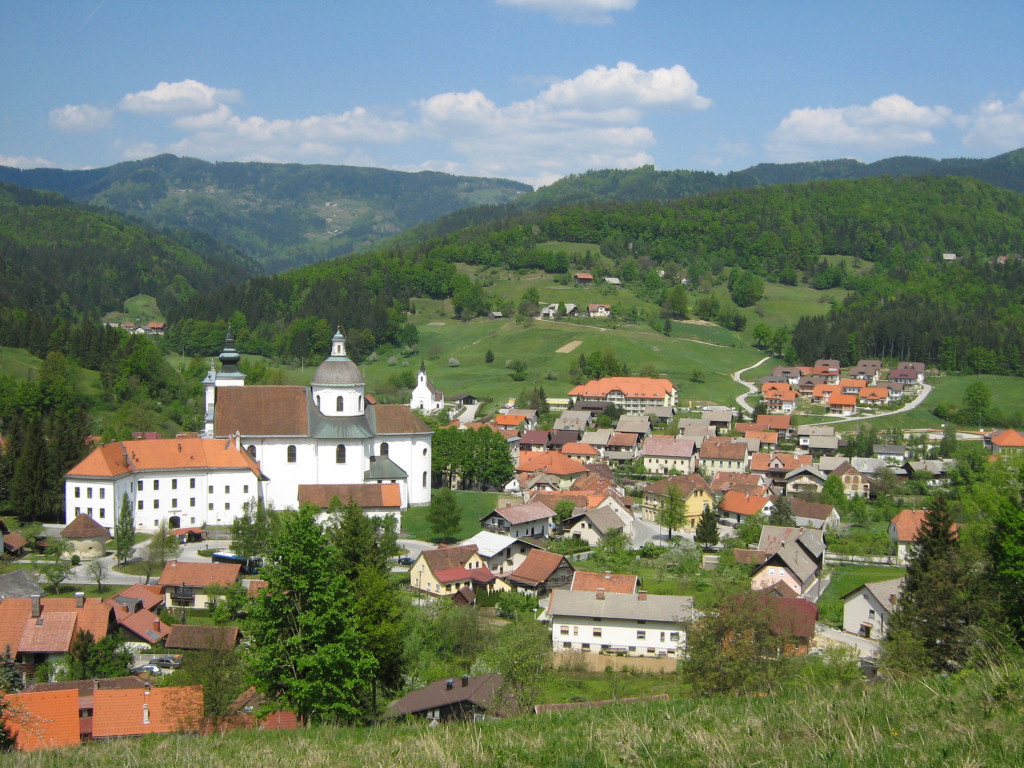

- Flag

- Location in Slovenia
- Coordinates: 46°17′46.04″N 14°48′18.62″E
- Country: Slovenia
- Traditional region: Styria
- Statistical region: Savinja
- Municipality: Gornji Grad

Area
  - Total: 10.9 km^{2} (4.2 sq mi)
- Elevation: 431.3 m (1,415 ft)

Population (2020)
  - Total: 1,016
  - Density: 93.2/km^{2} (241/sq mi)

Gornji Grad (pronounced [ˈɡoːɾnji ˈɡɾaːt]; German: Oberburg) is the largest settlement and the administrative centre of the Municipality of Gornji Grad in Slovenia.

== Geography ==
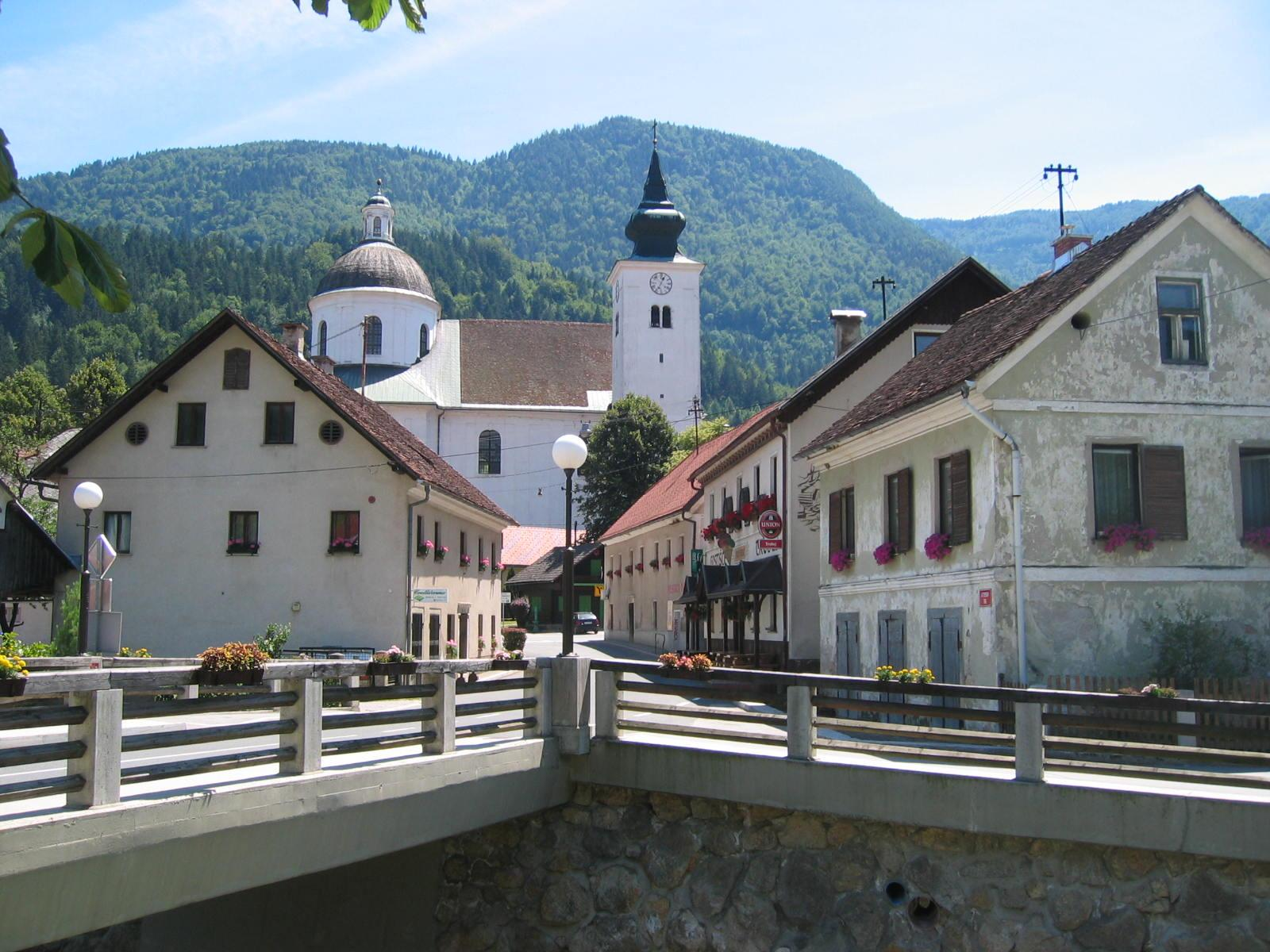
Northern entrance to Gornji Grad with the Dreta Bridge and Sts. Hermagoras and Fortunatus Church

It is located on the Dreta River, a right tributary of the Savinja, in the southeastern foothills of the Kamnik–Savinja Alps, about 36 km (22 mi) west of Celje and 35 km (22 mi) northeast of Ljubljana. Gornji Grad belongs to the traditional region of Styria. Today it is included in the Savinja Statistical Region. The road to the west leads to the Črnivec Pass and to Kamnik in Upper Carniola.

== History ==
Gornji Grad has a rich history. A fortress (grad) already existed at the site in the early 12th century. In 1140 Patriarch Pellegrinus I of Aquileia founded a Benedictine monastery vested with extended possessions in the vicinity. Temporarily held by the Lords of Žovnek (Sanneck) and of Ptuj (Pettau), Gornji Grad later passed to the Carinthian counts of Heunburg, relatives of Saint Hemma of Gurk, to Count Ulrich V of Pfannberg in 1322 and finally to the Counts of Celje. As part of the Duchy of Styria, the fief upon the death of Count Ulrich II of Celje in 1456 was seized by the Habsburg emperor Frederick III. In 1461 he established the Diocese of Ljubljana and incorporated the abbey as the summer residence of the Ljubljana bishops, however, against the strong resistance by the Benedictine monks. Ten years later the premises were devastated by Ottoman forces, whereafter the Ljubljana bishop Sigmund Lamberg had the monastery dissolved and converted into a diocesan priests' college in 1473.

=== Mass graves ===
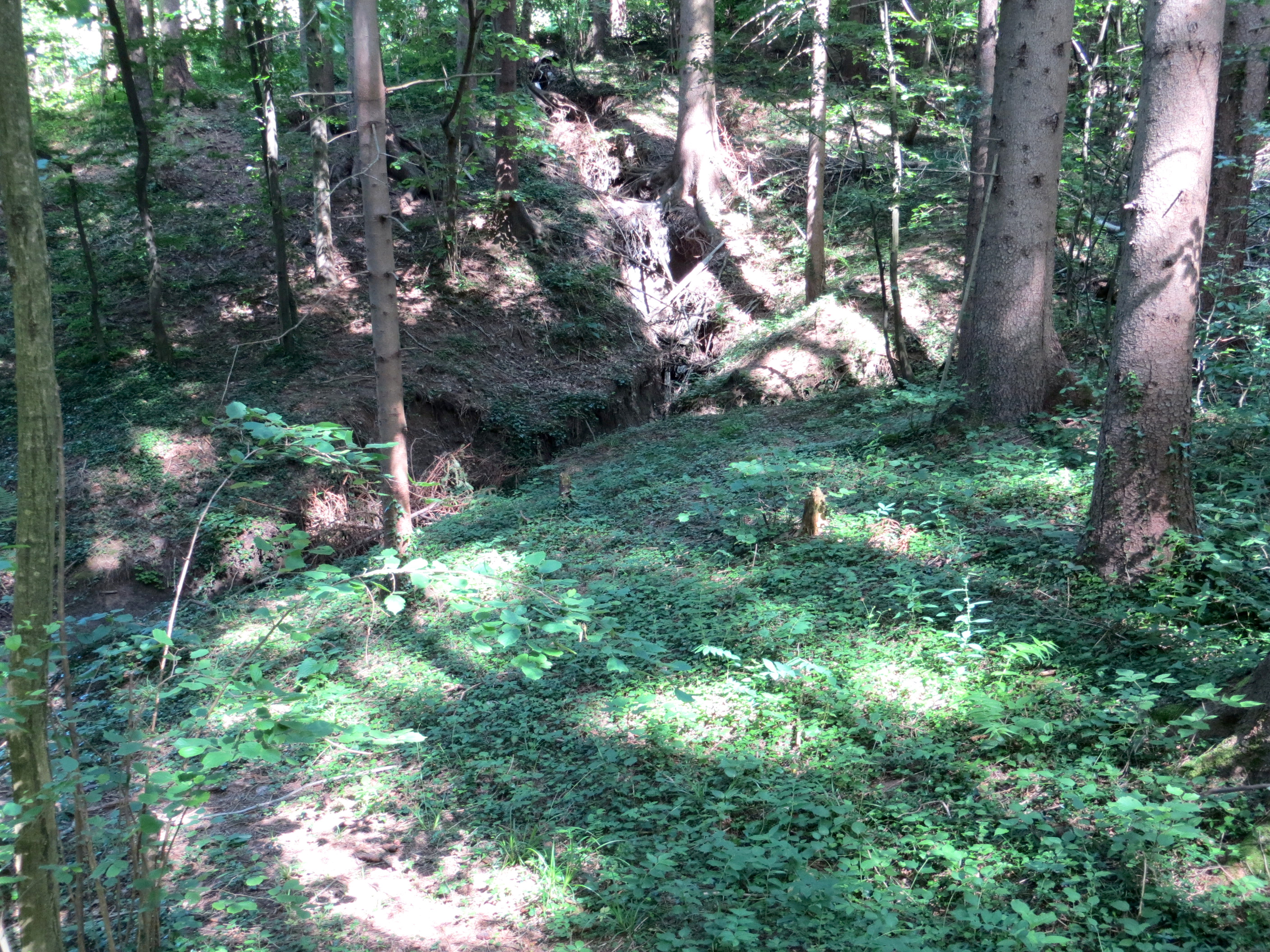
The Tičjek Mass Grave

Gornji Grad is the site of three known mass graves from the Second World War. The Tičjek Mass Grave (Slovene: Grobišče Tičjek) is located behind the house at Tičjek no. 20, on the northern edge of the settlement. It contains the remains of seven to nine civilians of various nationalities that were murdered in 1944. The Zabrinov Hill Mass Grave (Grobišče Zabrinovski hrib) is located on the slope of Zabrinov Hill (Zabrinovski hrib) west of Gornji Grad. It contains the remains of 56 Slovene militia members from Ptujska Gora and its vicinity that were murdered by the Partisans in October 1944. The Ravni 1 Mass Grave (Grobišče v Ravneh 1) is located south of the settlement, south of the LIP Smreka business park. Together with the mass grave in neighboring Dol, it contains the remains of 100 to 200 people executed by the Partisan command of the Fourth Operation Zone in the fall of 1944.

== Churches ==
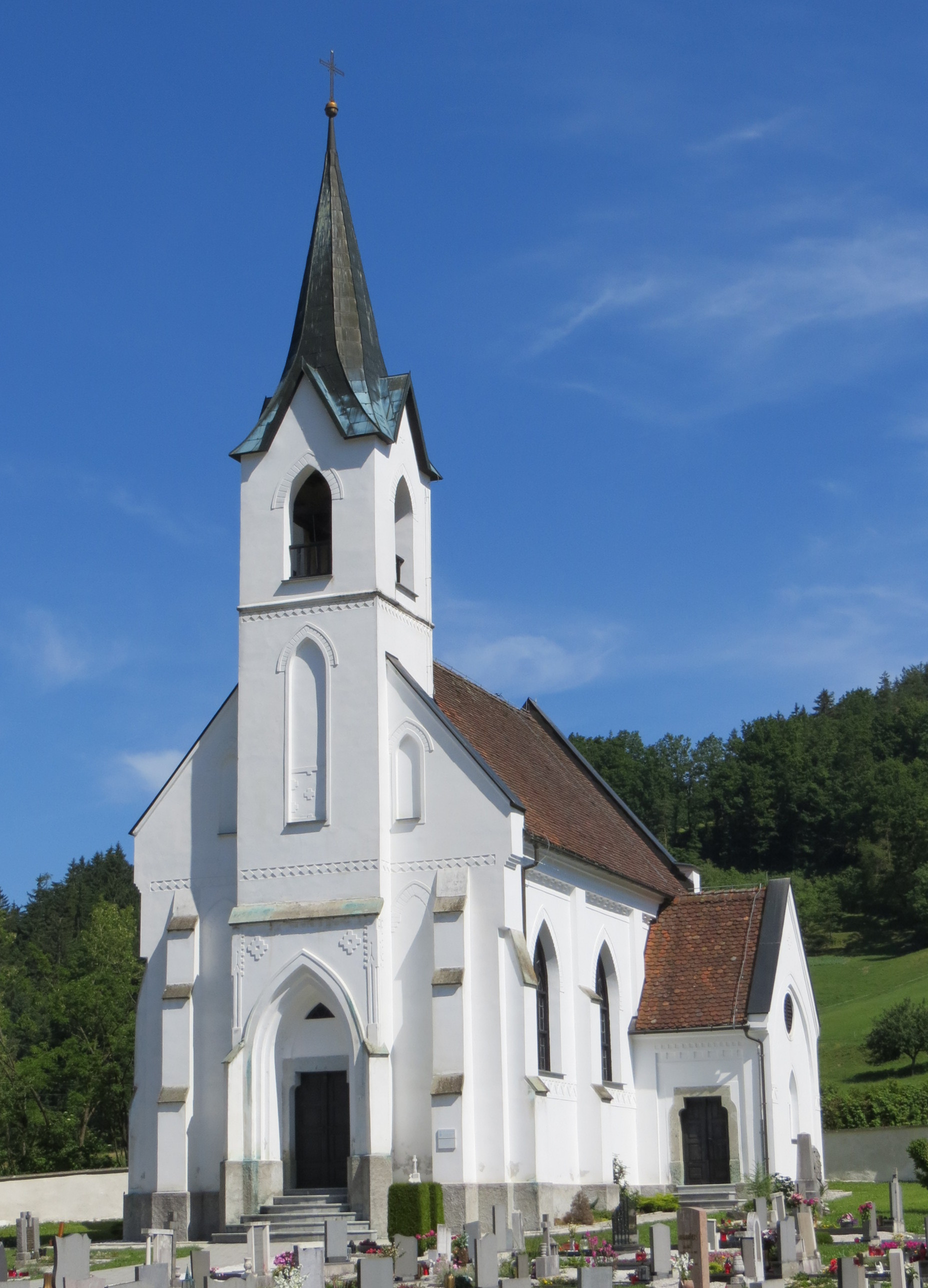
Mary Magdalene Church

The Baroque parish church of Gornji Grad is dedicated to Saints Hermagoras and Fortunatus. It is an episcopal church with a dome over its transept and contains 18th-century altar paintings and the tombs of the first bishops of Ljubljana.

A second church, surrounded by the cemetery in the northern part of the settlement, is dedicated to Mary Magdalene. It has a rectangular nave with a bell tower on the south wall and symmetrical side chapels. The polygonal chancel on the north end is walled on three sides. The stonework was created by Andrej Cesar in 1869 and the paintings by Tommaso Fantoni and Matija Koželj in 1870.

== Notable people ==
- Benedikt Kuripečič (c.1490–1532), diplomat
