= Rečica ob Savinji =

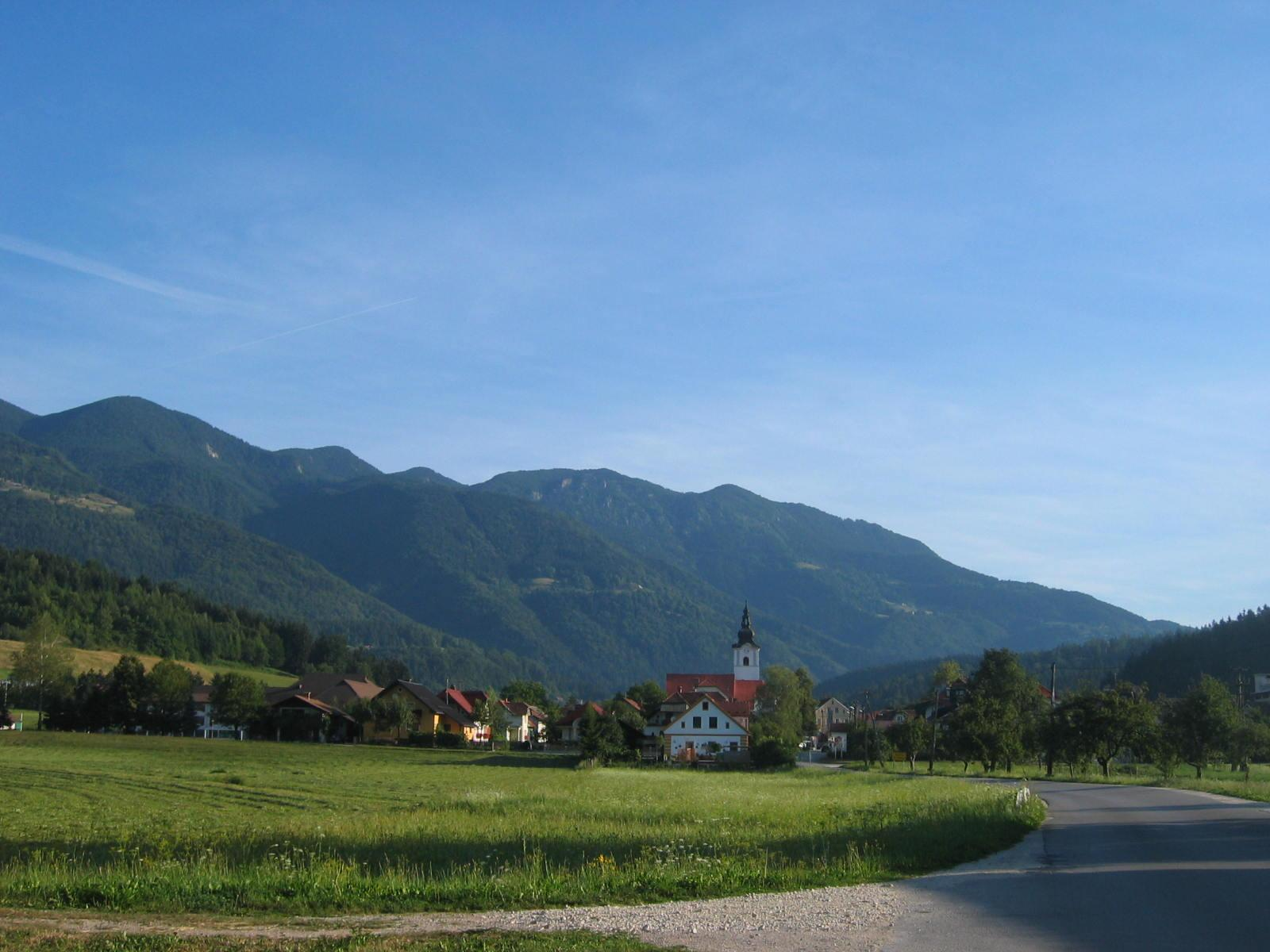

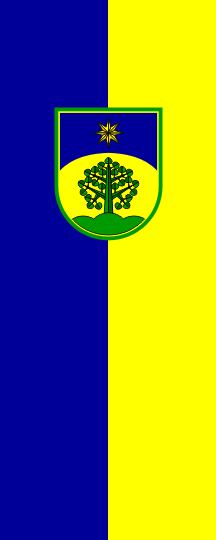
- Flag

- Location in Slovenia
- Coordinates: 46°19′29″N 14°55′22″E
- Country: Slovenia
- Traditional region: Styria
- Statistical region: Savinja
- Municipality: Rečica ob Savinji

Area
  - Total: 2.18 km^{2} (0.84 sq mi)
- Elevation: 367.0 m (1,204.1 ft)

Population (2019)
  - Total: 516
  - Density: 237/km^{2} (613/sq mi)

Rečica ob Savinji (pronounced [ɾɛˈtʃiːtsa ɔp saˈʋiːnji]) is a town in Slovenia. It belongs to the historical region of Styria and is now included in the Savinja Statistical Region. It has been the seat of the Municipality of Rečica ob Savinji since 2006. Before that it was part of the Municipality of Mozirje.

The parish church in the settlement is dedicated to Saint Cantius and belongs to the Roman Catholic Diocese of Celje. It was built in the mid-17th century on the foundations of a 12th-century church. Various adaptations were made at the end of the 18th and 19th centuries.
