= Ledinsko Razpotje =

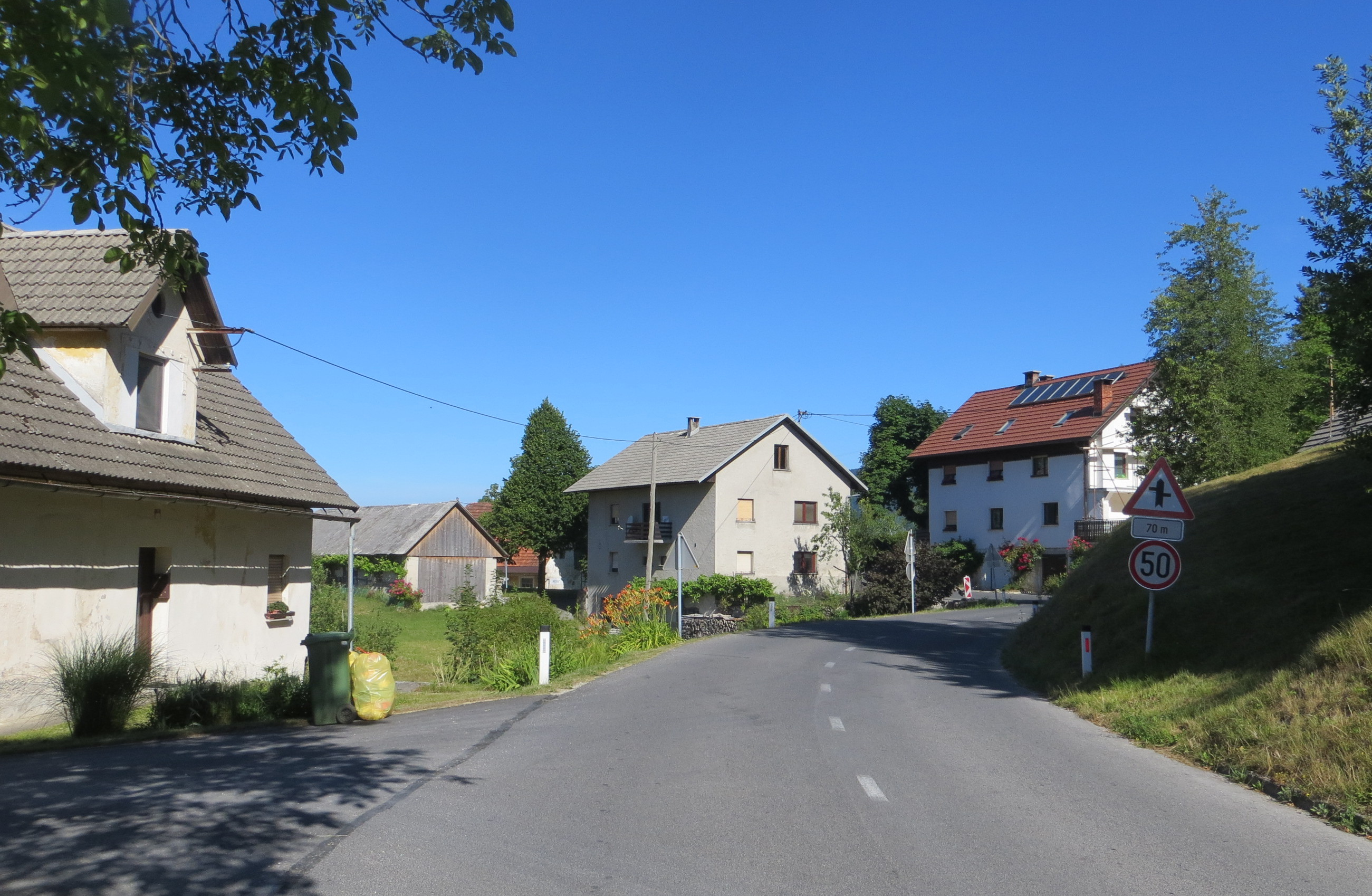

- Location in Slovenia
- Coordinates: 46°1′43.84″N 14°2′55.14″E
- Country: Slovenia
- Traditional region: Inner Carniola
- Statistical region: Gorizia
- Municipality: Idrija

Area
  - Total: 0.3 km^{2} (0.12 sq mi)
- Elevation: 710 m (2,330 ft)

Population (2013)
  - Total: 30
  - Density: 113/km^{2} (290/sq mi)
- Postal code: 8340

Ledinsko Razpotje (pronounced [lɛˈdiːnskɔ ˈɾaːspɔtjɛ], in older sources Veliko Razpotje) is a small settlement in the Municipality of Idrija in western Slovenia. Until 2009, the area was part of the settlements of Idršek and Pečnik. The settlement is part of the traditional region of Inner Carniola and is included in the Gorizia Statistical Region.

== Name ==
The name Ledinsko Razpotje literally means 'Ledine crossroads'; routes to Ledine, Gore, Spodnja Idrija, and Žiri meet in the village. The epithet Ledinsko 'Ledine' distinguishes the village from another village in the same municipality called Razpotje. The older name of the village, Veliko Razpotje, literally meant 'big crossroads'.
