= Razpotje =

Razpotje may refer to several places in Slovenia:

- Razpotje, Idrija, a settlement in the Municipality of Idrija
- Razpotje, Zagorje ob Savi, a settlement in the Municipality of Zagorje ob Savi
- Razpotje (formerly Kanomeljsko Razpotje), a hamlet of Srednja Kanomlja in the Municipality of Idrija
- Razpotje, a hamlet of Žažar in the Municipality of Horjul
- Ledinsko Razpotje, a settlement in the Municipality of Idrija
