= Srednja Kanomlja =

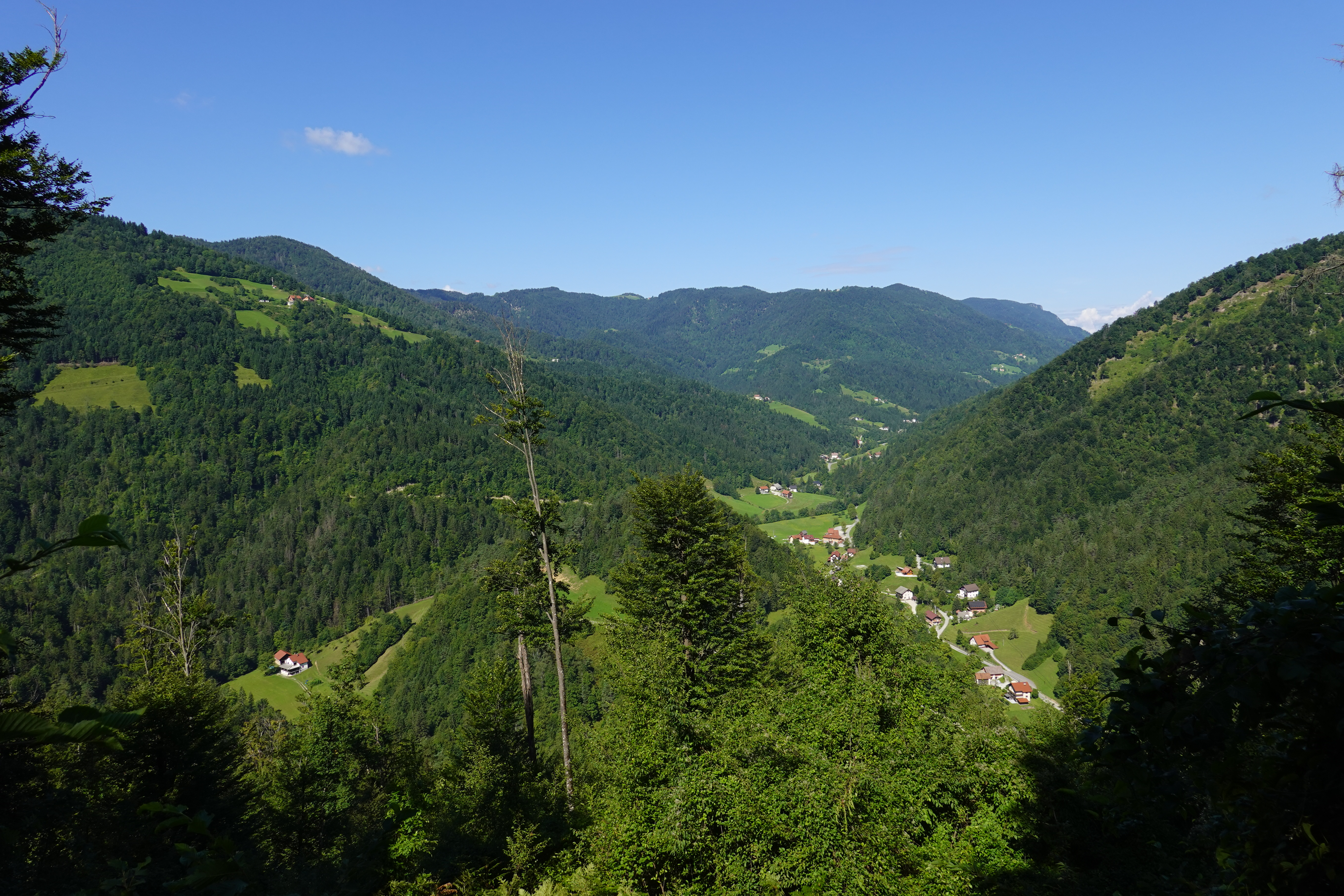
- View of Srednja Kanomlja from the east

- Location in Slovenia
- Coordinates: 46°1′24.86″N 13°59′21.24″E
- Country: Slovenia
- Traditional region: Inner Carniola
- Statistical region: Gorizia
- Municipality: Idrija

Area
  - Total: 7.54 km^{2} (2.91 sq mi)
- Elevation: 379.5 m (1,245 ft)

Population (2002)
  - Total: 280

Srednja Kanomlja (pronounced [ˈsɾeːdnja kaˈnoːmlja], German: Mitterkanomla; literally, 'middle Kanomlja'; cf. Spodnja Kanomlja 'lower Kanomlja') is a dispersed settlement in the Kanomljica Valley (along Kanomljica Creek, a small tributary of the Idrijca River named after Kanomlja) west of Spodnja Idrija in the Municipality of Idrija, Slovenia. The village formerly included the hamlet of Kanomeljsko Razpotje (literally, 'Kanomlja crossroads'), now Razpotje.

== Gallery ==
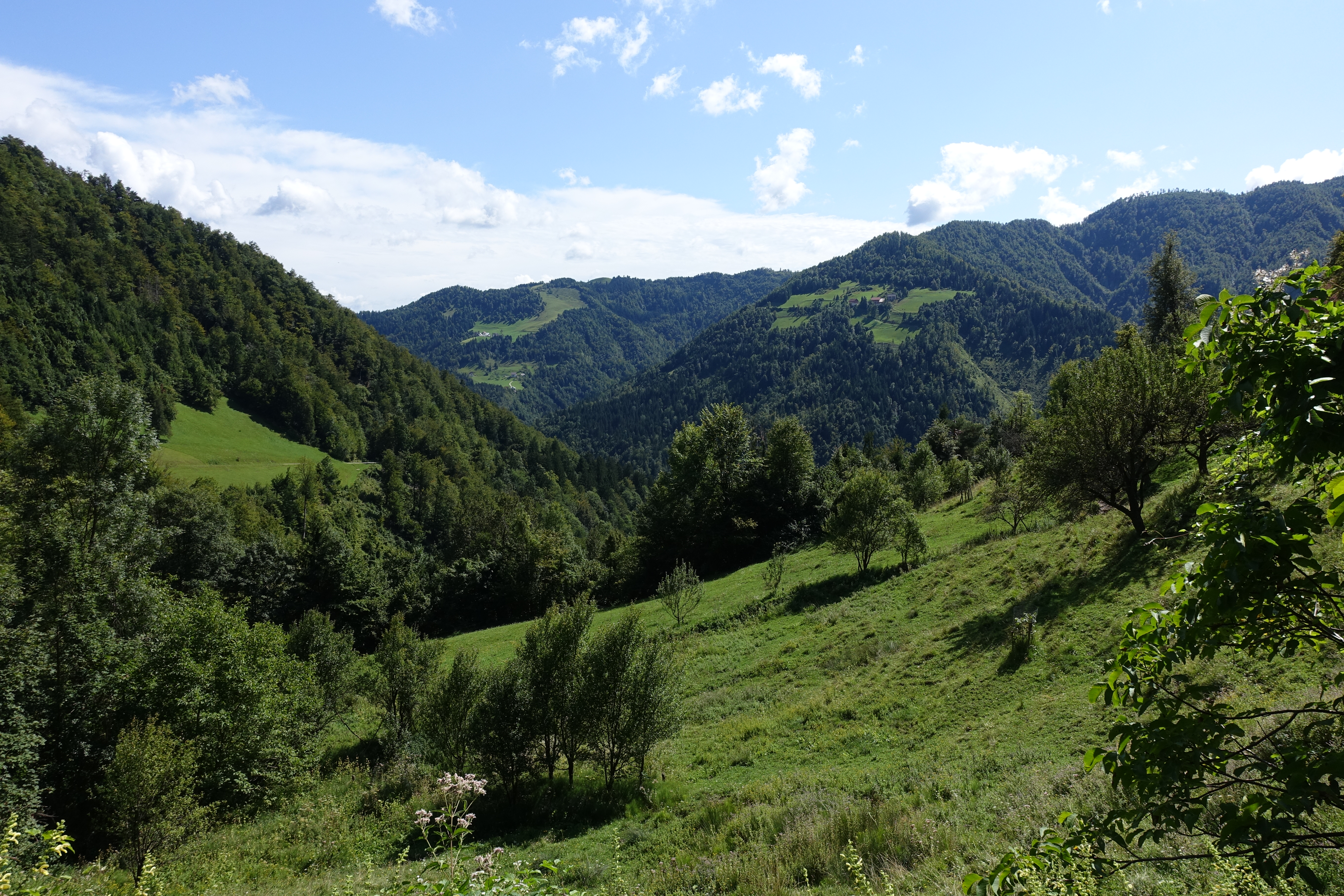
View from the northwest

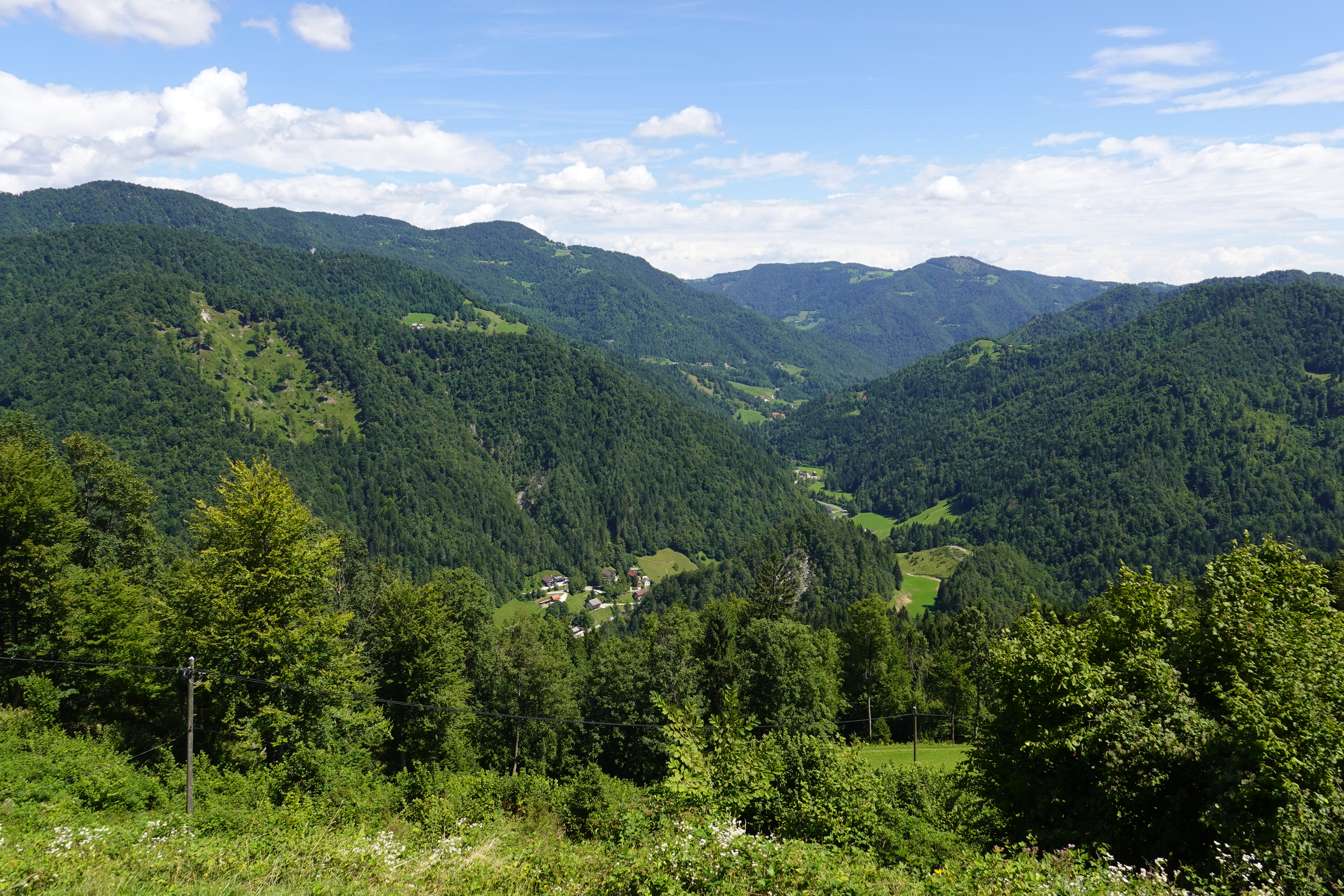
View from the southwest

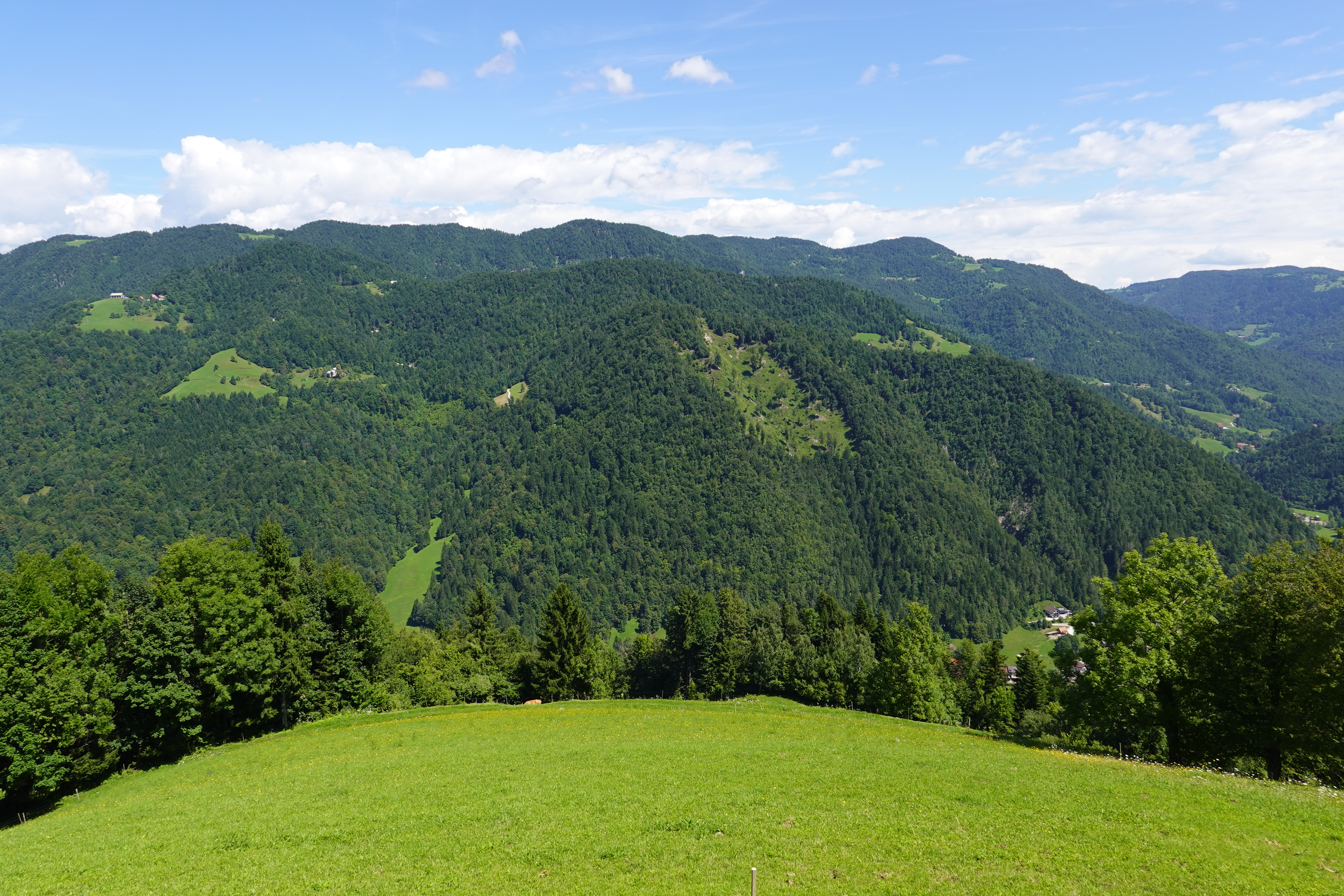
View from the south

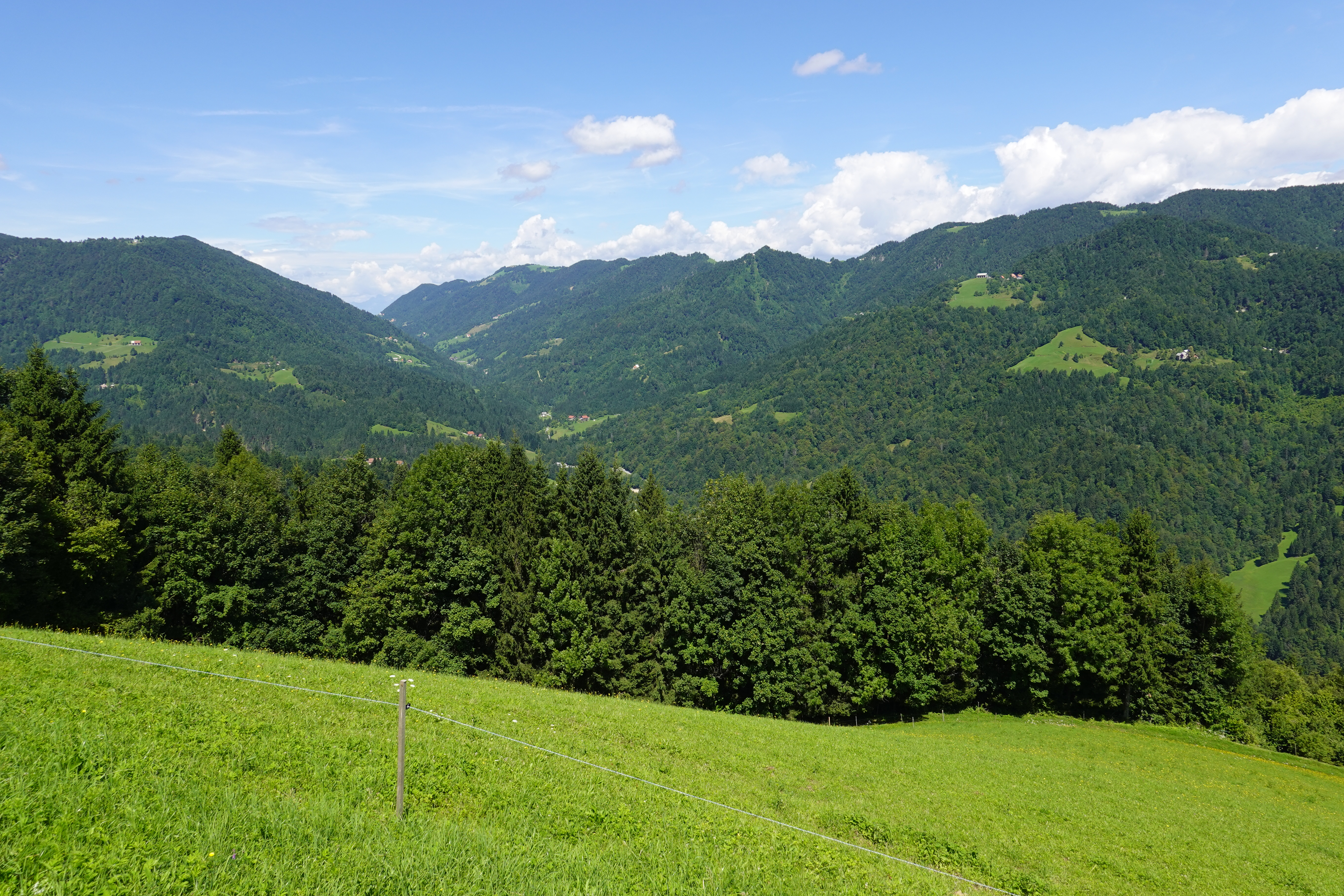
View from the southeast
