= Rejcov Grič =

- Location in Slovenia
- Coordinates: 46°0′5.43″N 13°59′1.78″E
- Country: Slovenia
- Traditional region: Inner Carniola
- Statistical region: Gorizia
- Municipality: Idrija

Area
  - Total: 1.1 km^{2} (0.42 sq mi)
- Elevation: 854 m (2,802 ft)

Population (2014)
  - Total: 15

Rejcov Grič (pronounced [ˈɾeːi̯tsɔu̯ ˈɡɾiːtʃ]) is an isolated settlement in the hills west of Idrija in the traditional Inner Carniola region of Slovenia. It includes the hamlets and isolated farms of Rejc, Rupa, and Lebanovše.

== History ==
Rejcov Grič was separated from Čekovnik and made a settlement in its own right in 2006.

== Name ==
The name Rejcov Grič literally means 'Rejc's hill' and refers to Rejc Hill (Slovene: Rejčev Grič, 877 meters or 2,877 feet), which rises northwest of the hamlet of Rejc. The newly founded settlement was initially officially named Rejcov grič (with a small g) in Slovene. However, this was declared an orthographic error a month later, and the official Slovene spelling was changed to Rejcov Grič (with a big G).

== Cultural heritage ==
A Second World War monument stands in the eastern part of the settlement, in the hamlet of Lebanovše. It was installed in 1969 and consists of a granite plaque mounted on a stone base topped by a stylized representation of Mount Triglav.
