= Municipality of Idrija =

Municipality of Slovenia

Municipality of Idrija Občina Idrija
- Municipality
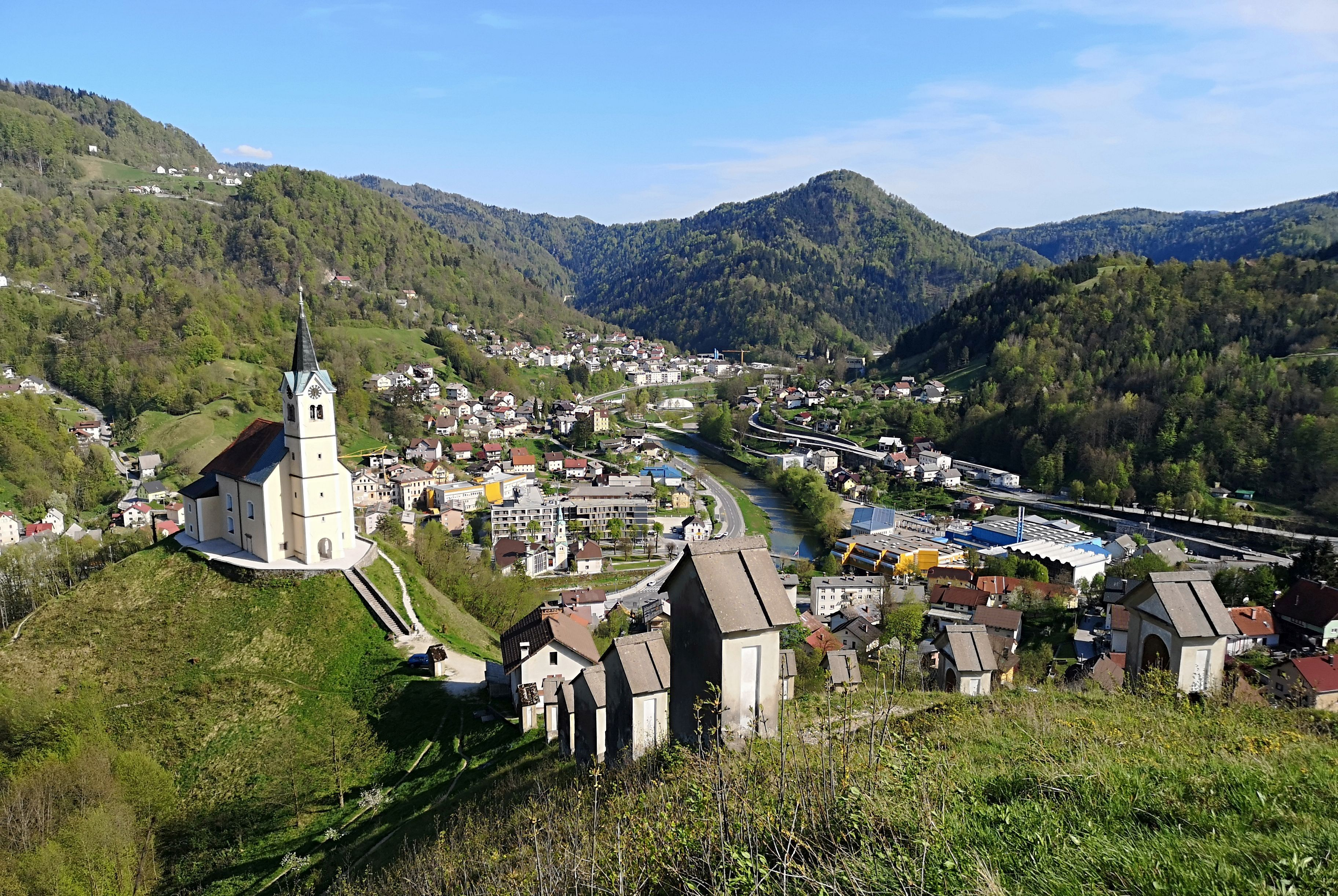

- Location of the Municipality of Idrija in Slovenia
- Coordinates: 46°00′N 14°01′E
- Country: Slovenia

Government
  - Mayor: Tomaž Vencelj (Independent)

Area
  - Total: 293.7 km^{2} (113.4 sq mi)

Population (2002)
  - Total: 11,990
  - Density: 40.82/km^{2} (105.7/sq mi)
- Time zone: UTC+01 (CET)
  - Summer (DST): UTC+02 (CEST)
- Website: www.idrija.si

The Municipality of Idrija (pronounced [ˈiːdrija]; Slovene: Občina Idrija) is a municipality in the Gorizia region of western Slovenia. Located in the traditional region of the Slovenian Littoral and in the Gorizia Statistical Region, the municipality covers 293.7 km^{2} of mostly forested terrain at the meeting point of the Dinaric and Alpine mountain chains. The municipality's economy was historically dominated by its mercury mine from 1490 until its closure in 1977, but has since diversified through companies specializing in automotive components and climate systems, while more recently developing tourism initiatives based on its UNESCO-recognized mining heritage and the Idrija Geopark established in 2013. In addition to the municipal seat of Idrija, the municipality includes 37 other settlements and had a population of 11,990 as of 2002.

== Settlements ==
In addition to the municipal seat of Idrija, the municipality also includes the following settlements:

- Čekovnik
- Črni Vrh
- Dole
- Godovič
- Gore
- Gorenja Kanomlja
- Gorenji Vrsnik
- Govejk
- Idrijska Bela
- Idrijske Krnice
- Idrijski Log
- Idršek
- Javornik
- Jelični Vrh
- Kanji Dol
- Korita
- Ledine
- Ledinske Krnice
- Ledinsko Razpotje
- Lome
- Masore
- Mrzli Log
- Mrzli Vrh
- Pečnik
- Potok
- Predgriže
- Razpotje
- Rejcov Grič
- Spodnja Idrija
- Spodnja Kanomlja
- Spodnji Vrsnik
- Srednja Kanomlja
- Strmec
- Vojsko
- Zadlog
- Zavratec
- Žirovnica

== History and economy ==
Idrija's municipal economy was dominated by its mercury mine from its discovery in 1490 until the global price collapse in the early 1970s. At its peak in 1966, the mine employed over 1,200 workers and produced 13% of the world's mercury; formal closure came in 1977. A preemptive diversification policy—state-funded retraining for miners and tax breaks for new firms—and the 1960s foundation of Kolektor (1963) and Hidria (1960s) laid the groundwork for Idrija's post-mining economy. By the late 1980s, these two companies accounted for the majority of local industrial employment, specialising in commutator parts, climate systems, and automotive components.

Population fluctuations from 1880 to 2021 reflect these economic shifts, with mid-20th-century growth followed by recent stability, and an unemployment rate that has consistently remained below the national average. Now roughly 62% of Idrija's workforce is employed within the municipality, giving it one of the highest rates of local self-sufficiency in Slovenia. Nevertheless, dependence on its two flagship exporters leaves Idrija with limited non-technical services employment, prompting recent efforts—UNESCO recognition of mining heritage in 2012, establishment of Idrija Geopark in 2013 and tourism-driven development—to broaden its economic base.

== Geography and natural heritage ==
The Municipality of Idrija covers 293.7 km^{2}, of which roughly 76% is forested and under 20% is devoted to agriculture. Its terrain straddles the Dinaric and Alpine chains, producing steep gorges, karst plateaus, and thrust-folded strata that expose rocks from Carboniferous shales (c. 300 Ma) through Paleocene–Eocene flysch (35–65 Ma) within a compact area. Noteworthy geoheritage features include the 120 km long Idrija Fault, the Wild Lake karst spring and cave, the 400 m deep Habeček Shaft (Slovene: Habečkovo brezno), and the numerous tectonic windows carved by the Idrijca River.

Protected natural sites occupy about 15.8% of the municipal area. Under three municipal decrees (1986, 1989, 1993), EU directives, and the 1999/2004 Nature Conservation Act, the municipality has designated 16 natural monuments, one natural reserve, and the 44.74 km^{2} Upper Idrijca Landscape Park. Together these measures help safeguard the region's geological diversity, hydrological features, and endemic flora and fauna while forming the foundation of the Idrija Geopark initiative launched in 2007.

== Rural development ==
The municipality's rural areas remain shaped by a long history of single-industry dependence on mercury mining. Following the mine's closure in 1990, this monostructural economy left outlying communities vulnerable to global market shifts. In response, the Municipality of Idrija and local partners have prioritised economic diversification, notably through sustainable tourism and cultural heritage initiatives designed to broaden the rural economic base.

In settlements such as Črni Vrh, residents, non-governmental organisations, and small businesses have come together under EU-backed programmes (DIAMONT, CAPACities, CHERPLAN and SY_CULTour) to develop participatory culture-driven tourism. These "bottom-up" efforts harness local "territorial capital"—including traditional crafts, folklore and waymarked trails—and the area's natural landscape to create small-scale tourism products. Although financial returns are modest, communities report that these projects reinforce rural identity, preserve local customs, and foster greater social cohesion.

== Geopark and heritage ==
The Idrija region lies at the meeting point of the Dinaric and Alpine mountain chains, resulting in a varied landscape of steep gorges, karst plateaus, and wooded peaks. The area's geology is defined by the Idrija mercury deposit, a roughly 1500 m long and up to 450 m deep ore body from which about 700 km of underground galleries were excavated between the late 15th century and 1988. Surviving industrial structures include the Francis Shaft (1792), the Čermak–Špirek rotary smelting furnace (1886), and the 17th-century system of logging sluices (Slovene: klavže), all preserved as part of the region's industrial heritage. Geological cross-sections exposed by the Idrijca River and its tributaries record Carboniferous to Eocene rock formations within a compact area.

In 2007, the Municipality of Idrija launched the Idrija Geopark project to unite its geological, cultural, and industrial assets into a single, sustainable tourism framework. Efforts to date include a comprehensive inventory and evaluation of geoheritage sites, the establishment of thematic trails (for example, along the historic Rake water channel), and educational programmes in partnership with local schools and universities. Two major exhibition venues have been created in the former mine administration building and in Gewerkenegg Castle (the Municipal Museum), housing collections of minerals, mining apparatus, and archival materials. Together these initiatives aim to conserve the municipality's distinctive identity and to offer visitors an immersive understanding of Idrija's five-century mining tradition.
