= Pečnik =

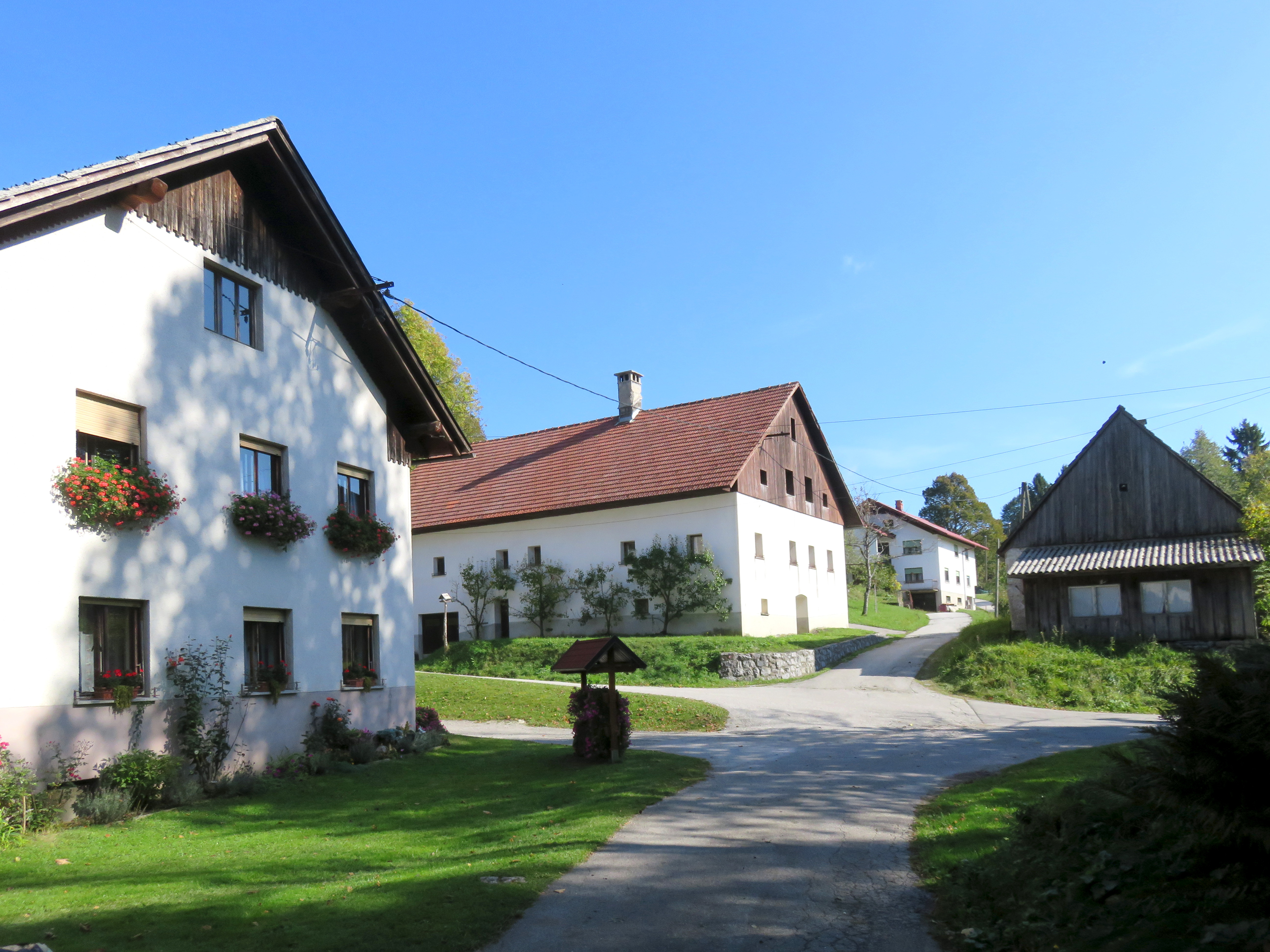

- Location in Slovenia
- Coordinates: 46°2′14.15″N 14°2′56.38″E
- Country: Slovenia
- Traditional region: Inner Carniola
- Statistical region: Gorizia
- Municipality: Idrija

Area
  - Total: 1.56 km^{2} (0.60 sq mi)
- Elevation: 799.8 m (2,624 ft)

Population (2002)
  - Total: 63

Pečnik (pronounced [pɛtʃˈniːk]) is a small settlement in the hills above Spodnja Idrija in the Municipality of Idrija in the traditional Inner Carniola region of Slovenia.
