= Ledine, Idrija =

Ledine
- Village
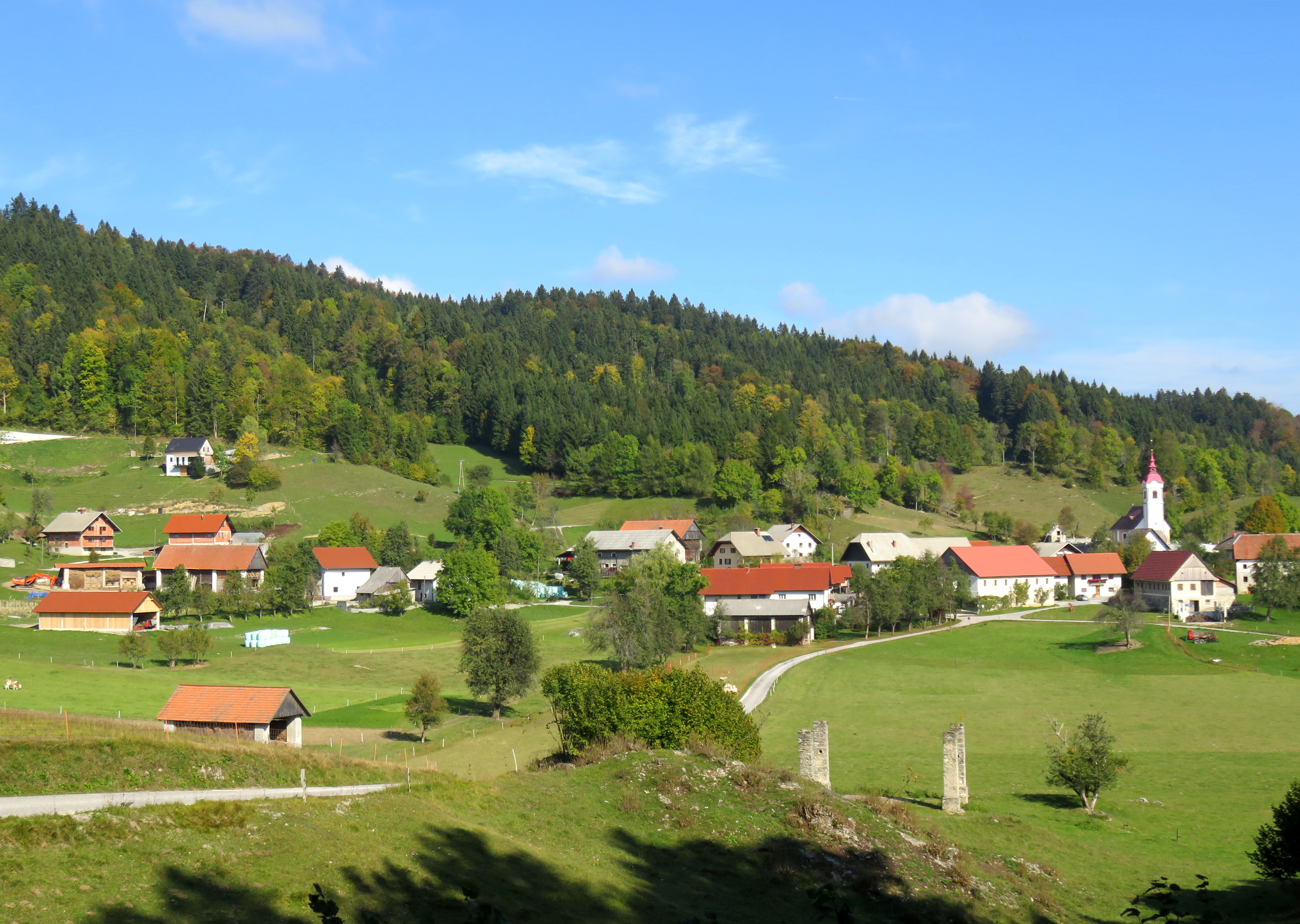

- Location in Slovenia
- Coordinates: 46°2′25.67″N 14°3′17.58″E
- Country: Slovenia
- Traditional region: Inner Carniola
- Statistical region: Gorizia
- Municipality: Idrija

Area
  - Total: 3.18 km^{2} (1.23 sq mi)
- Elevation: 776.9 m (2,549 ft)

Population (2002)
  - Total: 77

Ledine (pronounced [lɛˈdiːnɛ]) is a village in the hills east of Spodnja Idrija in the Municipality of Idrija in the traditional Inner Carniola region of Slovenia.

== Church ==
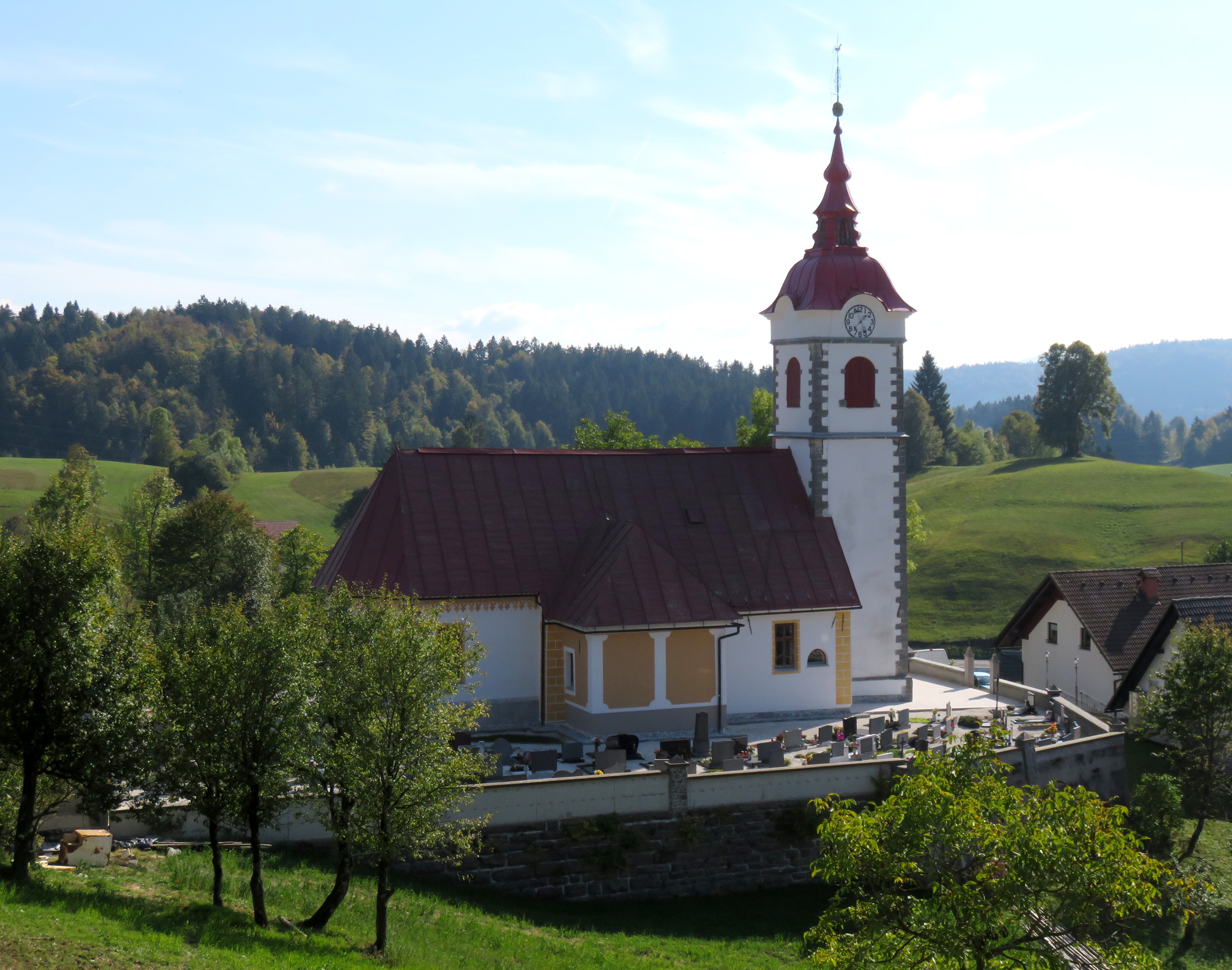
Saint James's Church

The parish church in the settlement is dedicated to Saint James and belongs to the Koper Diocese.
