= Mrzli Log =

- Location in Slovenia
- Coordinates: 45°56′15.43″N 13°58′17.91″E
- Country: Slovenia
- Traditional region: Inner Carniola
- Statistical region: Gorizia
- Municipality: Idrija

Area
  - Total: 6.9 km^{2} (2.7 sq mi)
- Elevation: 900.9 m (2,956 ft)

Population (2002)
  - Total: 22

Mrzli Log (pronounced [ˈməɾzli ˈloːk]) is a dispersed settlement in the hills west of Črni Vrh in the Municipality of Idrija in the traditional Inner Carniola region of Slovenia.
