= Zadlog =

- Location in Slovenia
- Coordinates: 45°56′11.43″N 14°0′31.69″E
- Country: Slovenia
- Traditional region: Inner Carniola
- Statistical region: Gorizia
- Municipality: Idrija

Area
  - Total: 11.67 km^{2} (4.51 sq mi)
- Elevation: 714.9 m (2,345 ft)

Population (2002)
  - Total: 277

Zadlog (pronounced [ˈzaːdlɔk] or [zaˈdloːk]; German: Sadlog) is a settlement northwest of Črni Vrh in the Municipality of Idrija in the traditional Inner Carniola region of Slovenia.

== Notable people ==
Notable people that were born or lived in Zadlog include:

- Frančišek Lampe (1859–1900), philosopher, theologian, writer, and editor
- Marko Ivan Rupnik (born 1954), mosaicist and theologian
