= Potok, Idrija =

Potok
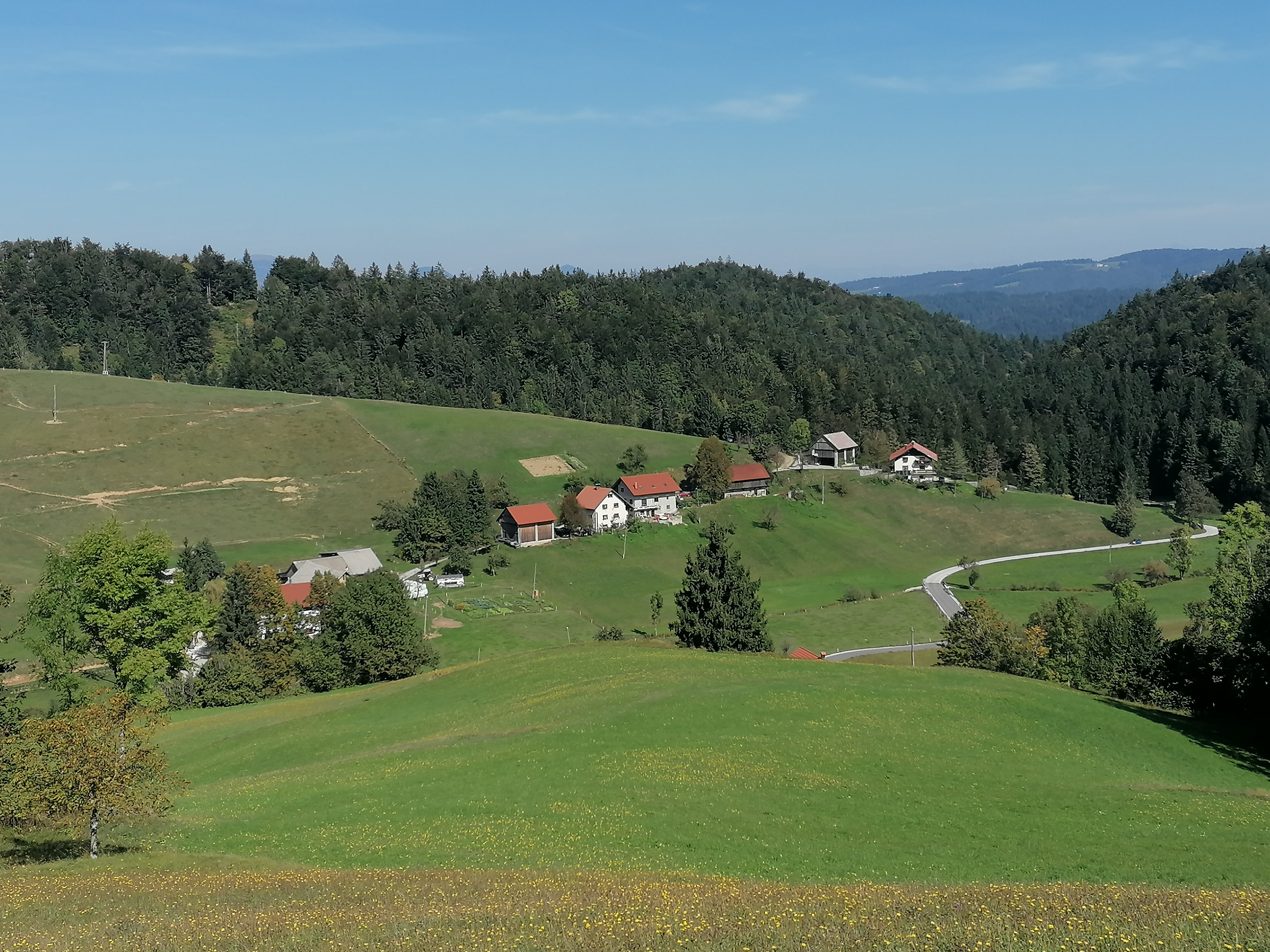

- Location in Slovenia
- Coordinates: 45°58′52.69″N 14°7′42.79″E
- Country: Slovenia
- Traditional region: Inner Carniola
- Statistical region: Gorizia
- Municipality: Idrija

Area
  - Total: 1.44 km^{2} (0.56 sq mi)
- Elevation: 746.6 m (2,449 ft)

Population (2002)
  - Total: 29

Potok (pronounced [ˈpɔːtɔk]) is a small settlement in the hills east of Idrija in the traditional Inner Carniola region. It include the hamlet of Mravljišče west of the main village center.

== Name ==
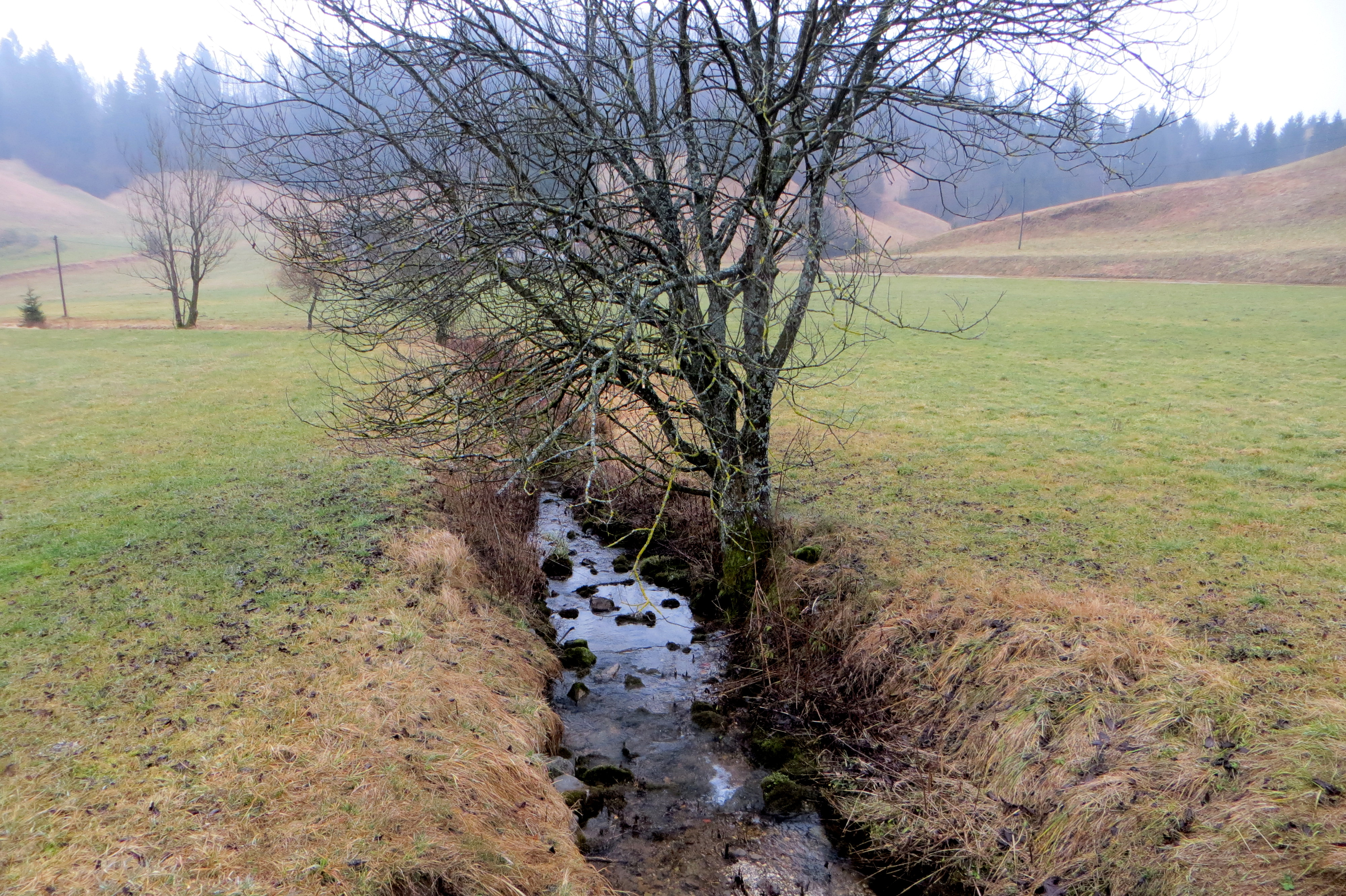
Jakopnik Creek in Potok

The name of the settlement literally means 'creek, stream'. Jakopnik Creek, which eventually feeds the Poljane Sora River, flows through the village.
