= Idrijska Bela =

Idrijska Bela Bela (before 1952)
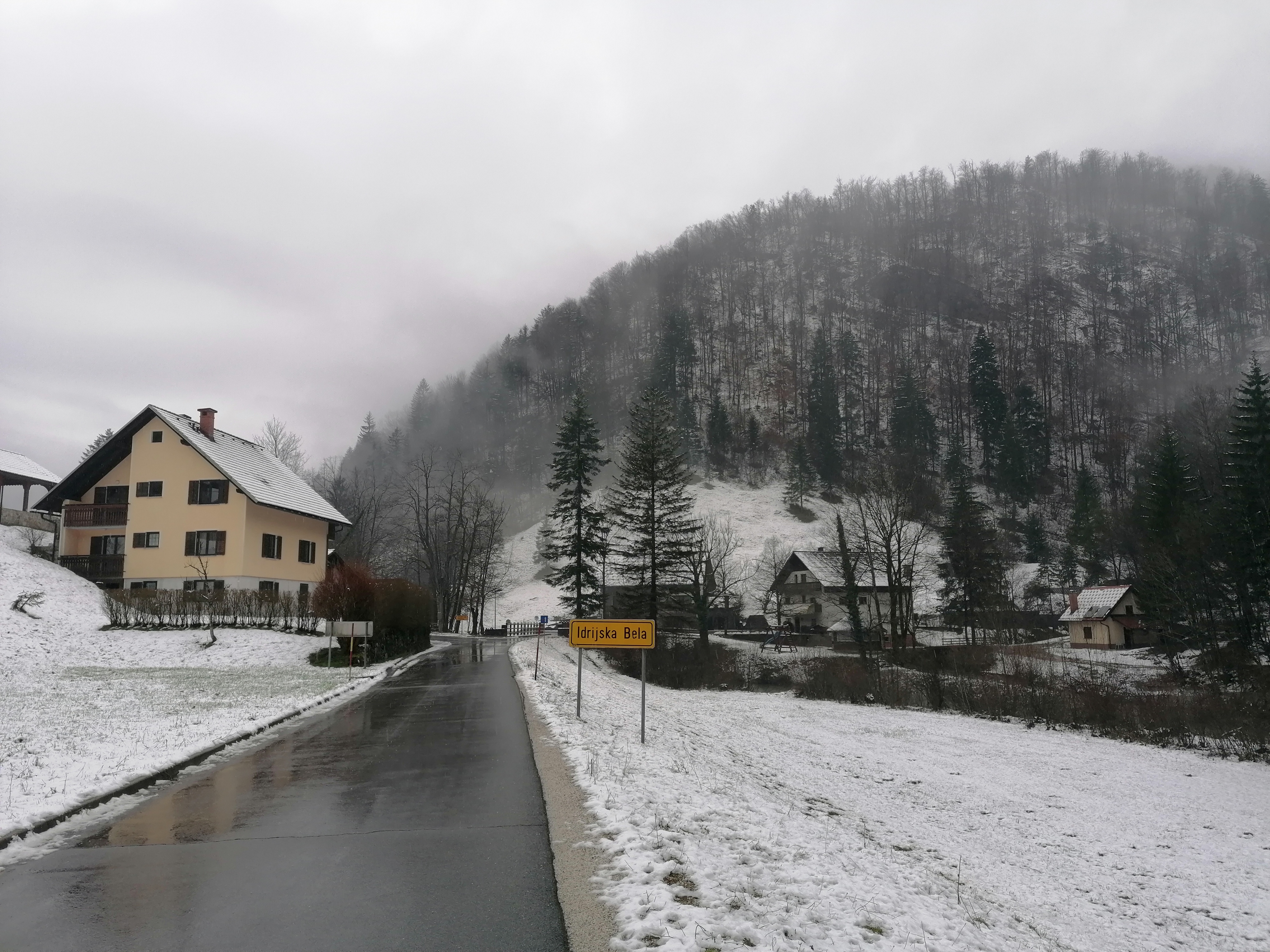

- Location in Slovenia
- Coordinates: 45°57′19.82″N 13°58′45.98″E
- Country: Slovenia
- Traditional region: Inner Carniola
- Statistical region: Gorizia
- Municipality: Idrija

Area
  - Total: 25.1 km^{2} (9.7 sq mi)
- Elevation: 414.7 m (1,361 ft)

Population (2002)
  - Total: 82

Idrijska Bela (pronounced [ˈiːdɾii̯ska ˈbeːla]; German: Großbela or Idrianer Bela) is a dispersed settlement in the Municipality of Idrija in the traditional Inner Carniola region of Slovenia. It lies in the hills southwest of the town of Idrija.

== Name ==
The name of the settlement was changed from Bela to Idrijska Bela in 1952.
