= Vojsko, Idrija =

Vojsko
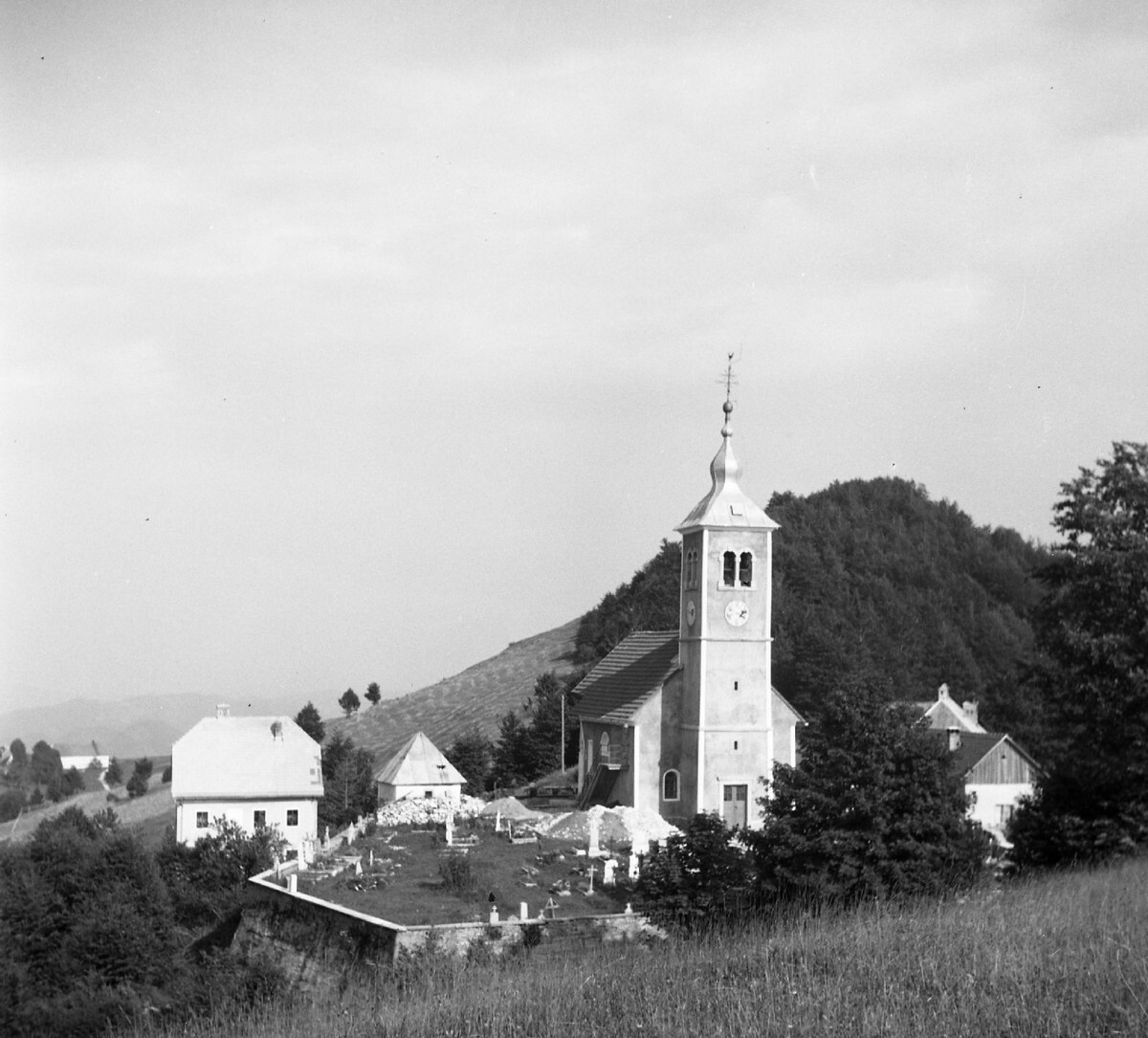
- Vojsko (1959)

- Location in Slovenia
- Coordinates: 46°1′25.09″N 13°54′12.25″E
- Country: Slovenia
- Traditional region: Inner Carniola
- Statistical region: Gorizia
- Municipality: Idrija

Area
  - Total: 41.22 km^{2} (15.92 sq mi)
- Elevation: 1,083.3 m (3,554 ft)

Population (2002)
  - Total: 197

Vojsko (pronounced [ˈʋoːi̯skɔ] or [ˈʋɔːi̯skɔ], German: Woiska) is a dispersed settlement in the hills west of Idrija in the traditional Inner Carniola region of Slovenia. It has a cluster of buildings centered on the parish church at its centre, and includes a number of smaller hamlets as well as remote farmsteads in the surrounding hills.

== Name ==
The name Vojsko arose through ellipsis from the noun phrase *vojьsko (selo) 'military settlement'. The name did not derive from visoko 'high', as sometimes hypothesized.

== Church ==
The parish church is dedicated to Saint Joseph and belongs to the Koper Diocese.

== Weather station ==
A weather station was installed at Vojsko in July 1928. Initially, it was used solely for measuring precipitation, but since November 1958 it has recorded all common meteorological observations.

Vojsko has a humid continental climate (Köppen Dfb).

Climate data for Vojsko 1981-2010 (1067m)
Month	Jan	Feb	Mar	Apr	May	Jun	Jul	Aug	Sep	Oct	Nov	Dec	Year
Record high °C (°F)	13.4 (56.1)	16.7 (62.1)	19.7 (67.5)	21.2 (70.2)	27.5 (81.5)	28.6 (83.5)	30.5 (86.9)	29.5 (85.1)	27.5 (81.5)	21.3 (70.3)	17.1 (62.8)	17.1 (62.8)	30.5 (86.9)
Mean daily maximum °C (°F)	0.3 (32.5)	1.5 (34.7)	5.2 (41.4)	9.5 (49.1)	15.0 (59.0)	18.4 (65.1)	21.1 (70.0)	20.5 (68.9)	15.6 (60.1)	10.6 (51.1)	4.9 (40.8)	1.3 (34.3)	10.3 (50.6)
Daily mean °C (°F)	−2.6 (27.3)	−2.1 (28.2)	1.3 (34.3)	5.3 (41.5)	10.6 (51.1)	13.7 (56.7)	16.0 (60.8)	15.5 (59.9)	11.2 (52.2)	7.0 (44.6)	1.9 (35.4)	−1.5 (29.3)	6.4 (43.4)
Mean daily minimum °C (°F)	−5.3 (22.5)	−5.0 (23.0)	−1.9 (28.6)	1.9 (35.4)	6.7 (44.1)	9.6 (49.3)	11.7 (53.1)	11.5 (52.7)	8.0 (46.4)	4.2 (39.6)	−0.5 (31.1)	−4.1 (24.6)	3.1 (37.5)
Record low °C (°F)	−20.5 (−4.9)	−18.7 (−1.7)	−17.0 (1.4)	−9.5 (14.9)	−2.0 (28.4)	1.1 (34.0)	4.0 (39.2)	1.4 (34.5)	−1.1 (30.0)	−8.2 (17.2)	−14.5 (5.9)	−18.4 (−1.1)	−20.5 (−4.9)
Average precipitation mm (inches)	147 (5.8)	126 (5.0)	167 (6.6)	174 (6.9)	171 (6.7)	176 (6.9)	143 (5.6)	160 (6.3)	215 (8.5)	244 (9.6)	301 (11.9)	252 (9.9)	2,276 (89.7)
Average extreme snow depth cm (inches)	37 (15)	50 (20)	52 (20)	16 (6.3)	0 (0)	0 (0)	0 (0)	0 (0)	0 (0)	0 (0)	5 (2.0)	20 (7.9)	15.0 (5.9)
Average snowy days (≥ 0 cm)	25	23	23	12	1	0	0	0	0	1	8	22	114
Source: Slovenian Environment Agency (ARSO)

Climate data for Vojsko (elevation 1,068 m; 1957–2022)
Month	Jan	Feb	Mar	Apr	May	Jun	Jul	Aug	Sep	Oct	Nov	Dec	Year
Record high °C (°F)	14.6 (58.3)	16.7 (62.1)	19.7 (67.5)	22.9 (73.2)	27.5 (81.5)	31.0 (87.8)	30.5 (86.9)	31.7 (89.1)	27.5 (81.5)	22.1 (71.8)	21.6 (70.9)	17.1 (62.8)	31.7 (89.1)
Mean daily maximum °C (°F)	0.52 (32.94)	1.72 (35.10)	5.25 (41.45)	9.57 (49.23)	14.52 (58.14)	18.44 (65.19)	20.67 (69.21)	20.16 (68.29)	15.73 (60.31)	10.74 (51.33)	5.37 (41.67)	1.6 (34.9)	10.36 (50.65)
Daily mean °C (°F)	−2.34 (27.79)	−1.56 (29.19)	1.53 (34.75)	5.6 (42.1)	10.34 (50.61)	14.01 (57.22)	16.04 (60.87)	15.51 (59.92)	11.62 (52.92)	7.23 (45.01)	2.58 (36.64)	−1.1 (30.0)	6.62 (43.92)
Mean daily minimum °C (°F)	−5.0 (23.0)	−4.43 (24.03)	−1.58 (29.16)	2.17 (35.91)	6.58 (43.84)	9.99 (49.98)	11.8 (53.2)	11.64 (52.95)	8.3 (46.9)	4.36 (39.85)	0.07 (32.13)	−3.69 (25.36)	3.35 (38.03)
Record low °C (°F)	−20.5 (−4.9)	−18.7 (−1.7)	−20.0 (−4.0)	−10.2 (13.6)	−4.5 (23.9)	0.5 (32.9)	2.0 (35.6)	1.4 (34.5)	−1.3 (29.7)	−8.3 (17.1)	−14.5 (5.9)	−18.4 (−1.1)	−20.5 (−4.9)
Average precipitation mm (inches)	166.07 (6.54)	157.1 (6.19)	174.72 (6.88)	181.44 (7.14)	177.1 (6.97)	185.44 (7.30)	161.47 (6.36)	162.85 (6.41)	213.79 (8.42)	236.69 (9.32)	311.68 (12.27)	235.99 (9.29)	2,364.34 (93.09)
Average extreme snow depth cm (inches)	66.28 (26.09)	81.8 (32.2)	82.06 (32.31)	44.13 (17.37)	8.06 (3.17)	0.0 (0.0)	0.0 (0.0)	0.0 (0.0)	7.75 (3.05)	8.06 (3.17)	30.07 (11.84)	50.0 (19.7)	82.06 (32.31)
Average precipitation days (≥ 0.1 mm)	11.37	10.85	11.85	14.42	15.46	15.23	13.12	12.45	11.52	12.88	13.97	12.2	155.32
Average rainy days (≥ 0.1 mm)	5.49	5.71	7.43	12.22	15.18	15.23	13.11	12.45	11.48	12.29	11.75	7.46	129.8
Average snowy days (≥ 0.1 mm)	7.83	7.2	6.6	4.51	0.78	0.05	0.0	0.0	0.06	0.91	4.02	6.95	38.91
Average relative humidity (%)	82.07	79.5	75.33	74.16	74.9	74.77	73.13	76.33	81.53	85.0	84.62	83.73	78.76
Average afternoon relative humidity (%)	77.6	72.73	64.7	62.97	63.52	63.23	60.6	62.0	69.03	75.97	79.83	79.97	69.35
Mean monthly sunshine hours	85.49	98.07	123.69	158.59	191.52	211.03	255.22	224.19	172.36	143.41	89.29	80.37	1,833.23
Source: National Meteorological Service of Slovenia – Archive
