= Korita, Idrija =

Korita
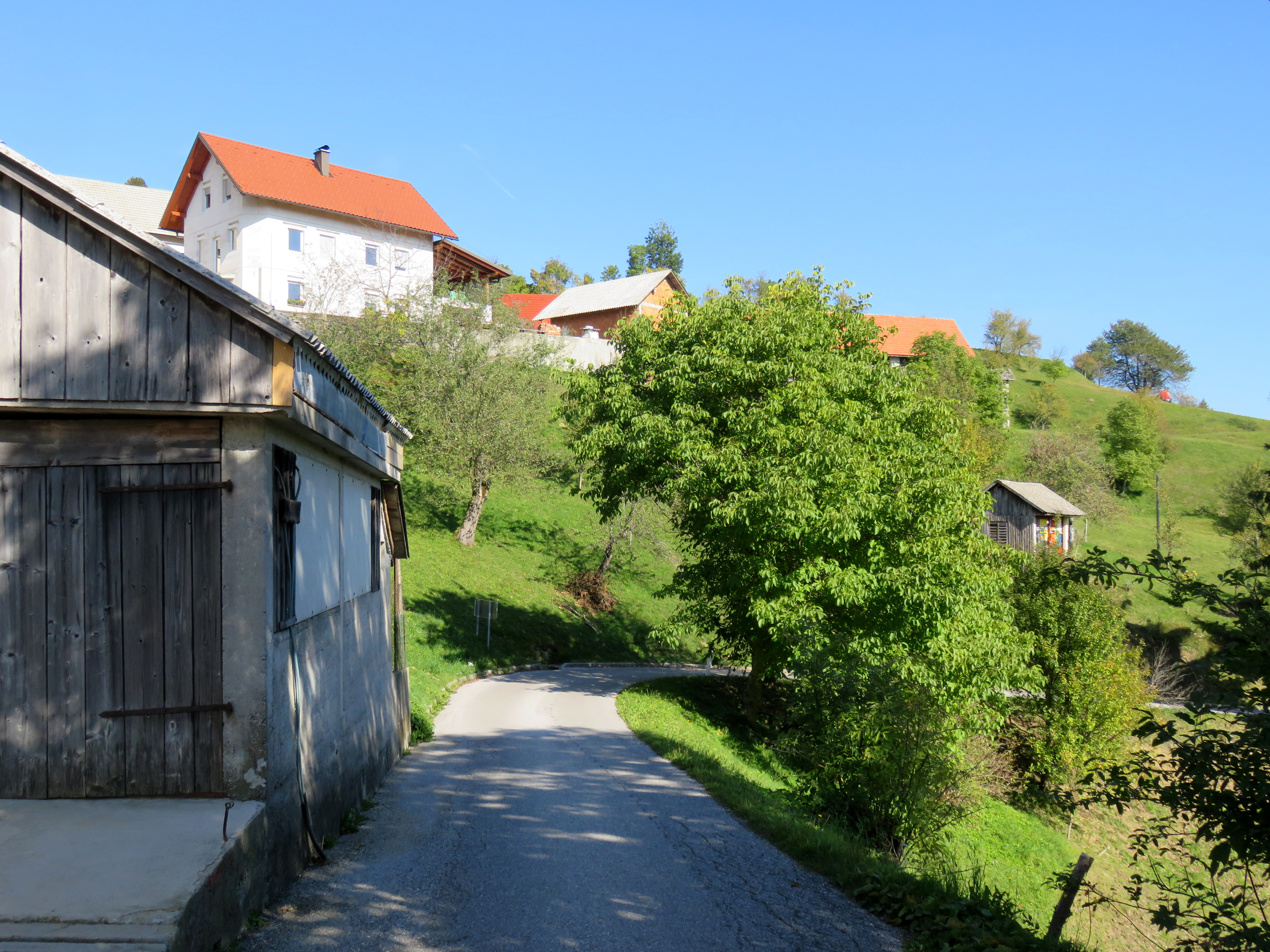

- Location in Slovenia
- Coordinates: 46°2′36.31″N 14°4′30.89″E
- Country: Slovenia
- Traditional region: Inner Carniola
- Statistical region: Gorizia
- Municipality: Idrija

Area
  - Total: 0.85 km^{2} (0.33 sq mi)
- Elevation: 818.1 m (2,684 ft)

Population (2002)
  - Total: 19

Korita (pronounced [kɔˈɾiːta]) is a small village in the hills between Idrija and Žiri in Slovenia. It lies within the Municipality of Idrija in the traditional Inner Carniola region.
