= Kanji Dol =

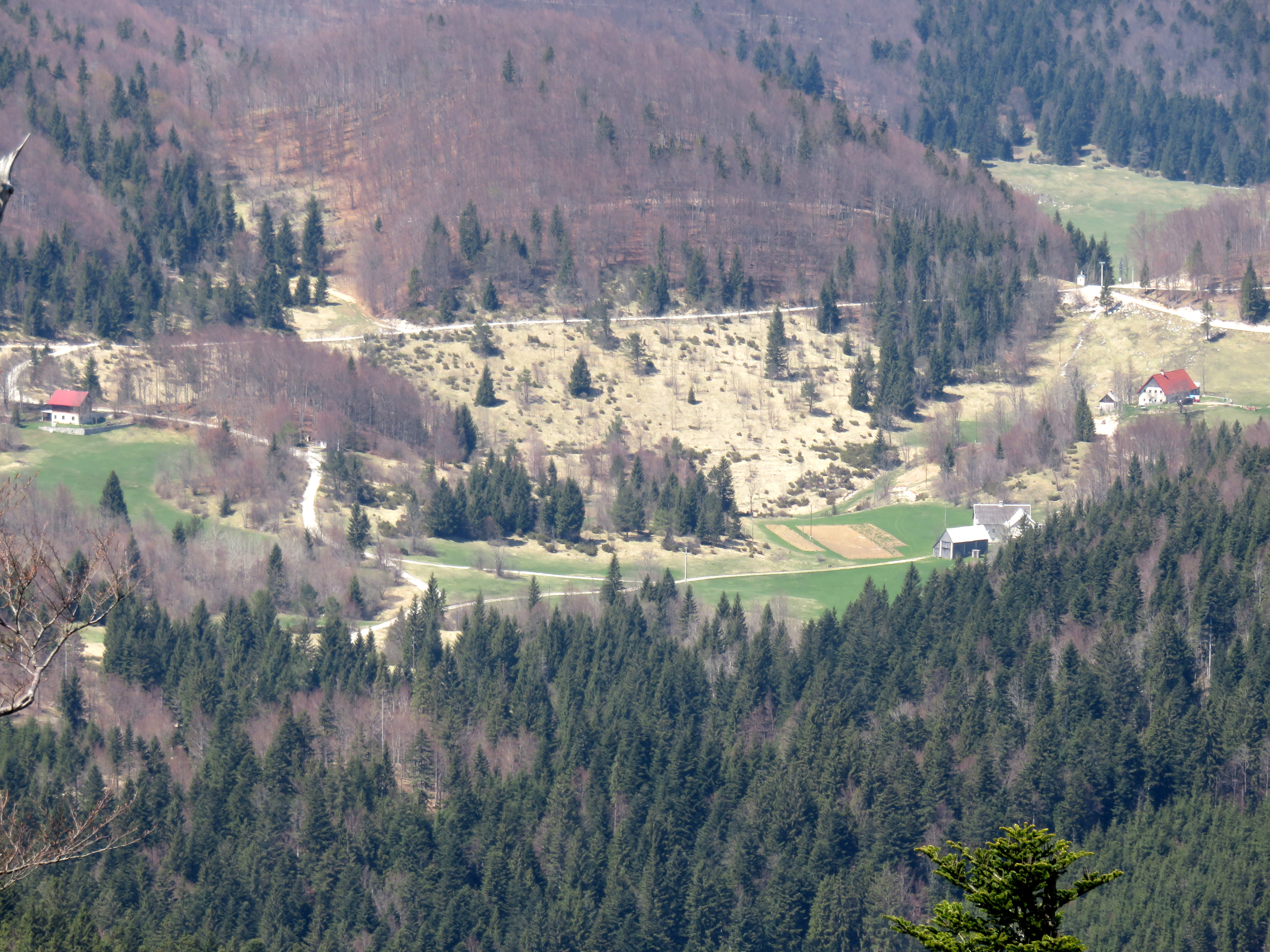

- Location in Slovenia
- Coordinates: 45°53′59.19″N 14°2′55.55″E
- Country: Slovenia
- Traditional region: Inner Carniola
- Statistical region: Gorizia
- Municipality: Idrija

Area
  - Total: 3.63 km^{2} (1.40 sq mi)
- Elevation: 897.3 m (2,944 ft)

Population (2015)
  - Total: 11
  - Density: 3/km^{2} (7.8/sq mi)

Kanji Dol (pronounced [ˈkaːnji ˈdoːu̯]; German: Kanidol) is a dispersed settlement in the hills south of Črni Vrh in the Municipality of Idrija in the traditional Inner Carniola region of Slovenia. The settlement no longer had any permanent residents according to the 2002 census, but it has been repopulated in recent years.
