= Žirovnica, Idrija =

Žirovnica
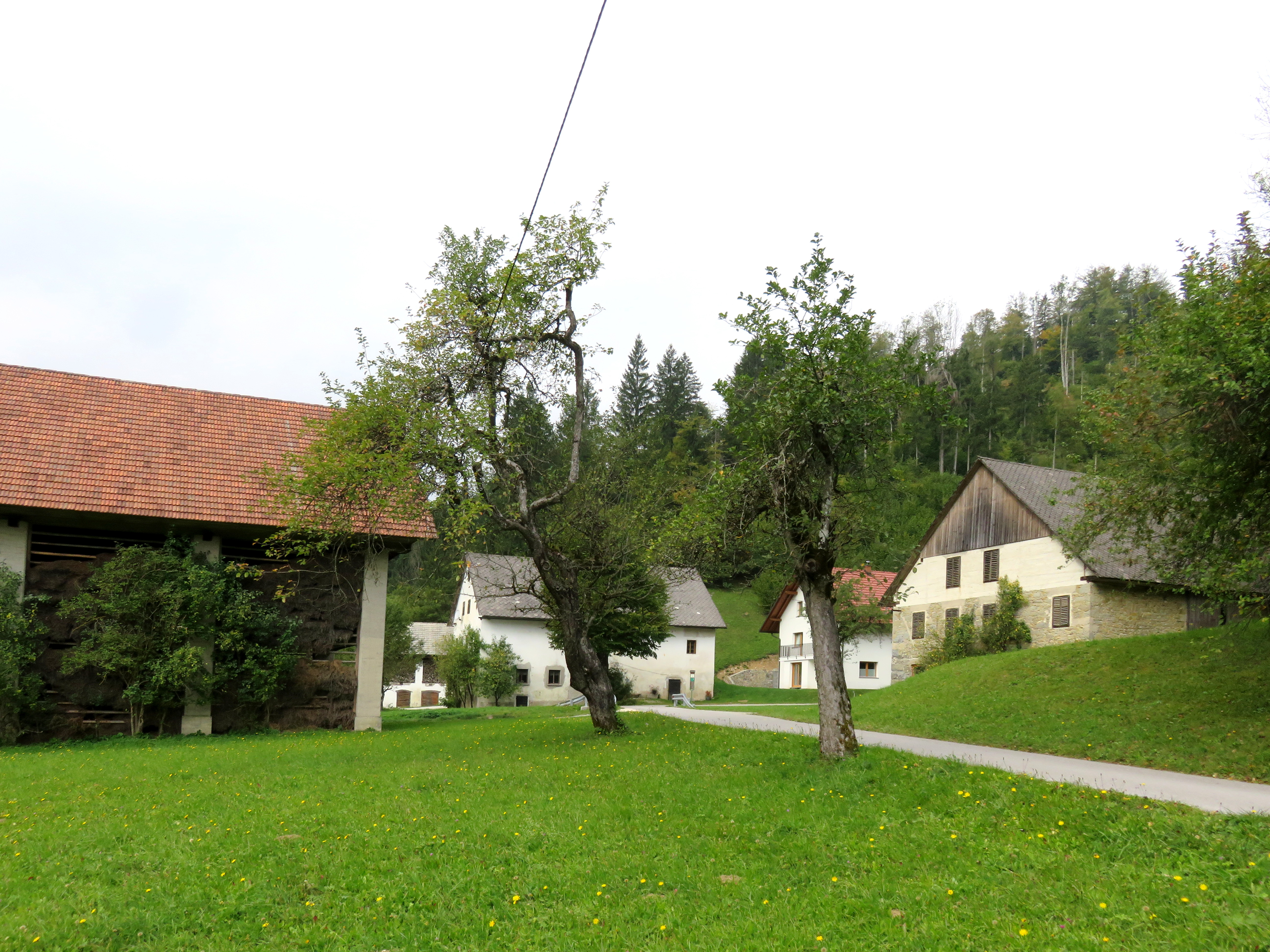

- Location in Slovenia
- Coordinates: 46°0′51.76″N 14°5′21.45″E
- Country: Slovenia
- Traditional region: Inner Carniola
- Statistical region: Gorizia
- Municipality: Idrija

Area
  - Total: 1.56 km^{2} (0.60 sq mi)
- Elevation: 543.2 m (1,782 ft)

Population (2002)
  - Total: 26

Žirovnica (pronounced [ʒiˈɾoːu̯nitsa]; German: Scheraunitz) is a small settlement in the valley of Žirovnica Creek, a tributary of the Poljane Sora River, south of Žiri in Slovenia. Although it is easily accessible by road only from the Žiri side, which is in the Upper Carniola region of Slovenia, it actually lies in the Municipality of Idrija in the traditional Inner Carniola region.
