= Strmec, Idrija =

Strmec
- Location in Slovenia
- Coordinates: 45°54′30.83″N 14°1′25.46″E
- Country: Slovenia
- Traditional region: Inner Carniola
- Statistical region: Gorizia
- Municipality: Idrija

Area
  - Total: 2.85 km^{2} (1.10 sq mi)
- Elevation: 845.2 m (2,773 ft)

Population (2002)
  - Total: 26

Strmec (pronounced [ˈstəɾməts], in older sources also Strmica, German: Stermza) is a small dispersed settlement in the hills south of Črni Vrh in the Municipality of Idrija in the traditional Inner Carniola region of Slovenia.

Strmec belongs to the cadastral municipality of Kanji Dol. Strmec has 12 numbered houses with traditional estate names: pri Šemrl (or Vodnar; no. 1), Tič (no. 2), Cenck (no. 3), Medved (no. 4), Podobnik (no. 5), Peter (no. 6), Skokec (no. 7), Štorc (no. 8), Skalar (no. 9), Renk (no. 10), Zajc (no. 11), and Strmec (no. 12). The Skalar house is now in ruins and it is no longer officially numbered. It was assigned number 8 c. 1823, but was reassigned the number 9 in 1959.

== Gallery ==
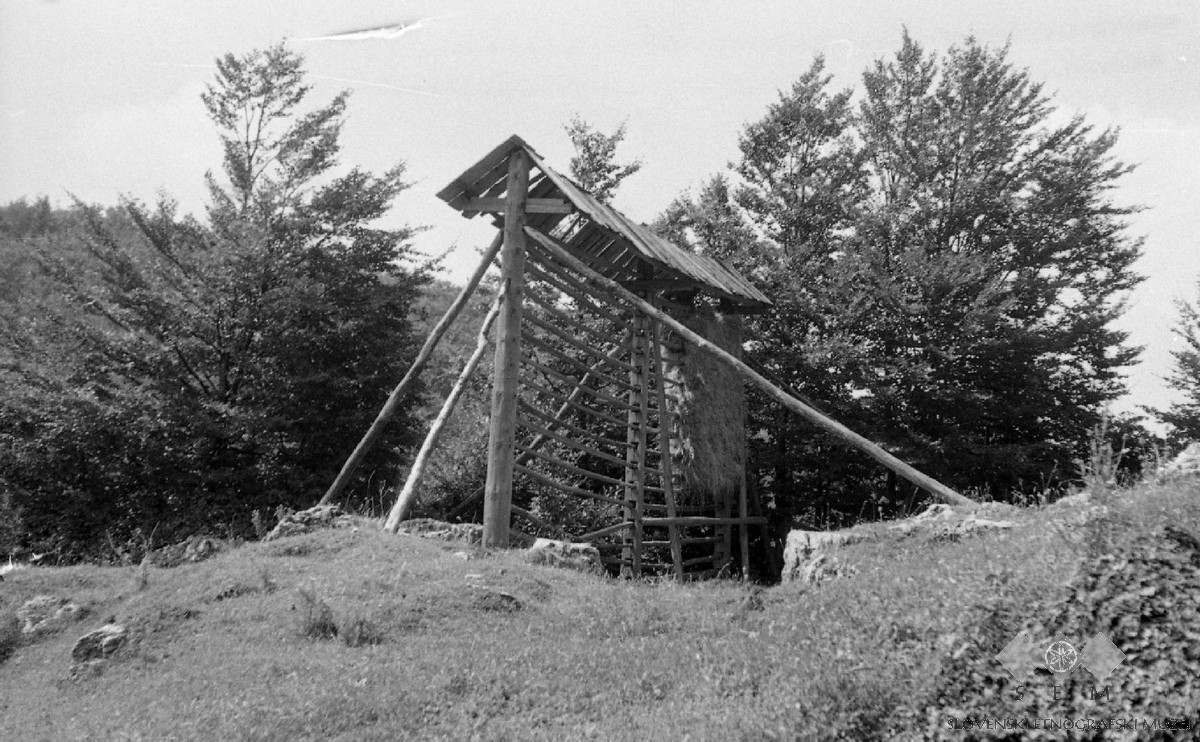
Podobnik hayrack, Strmec 5, 1959

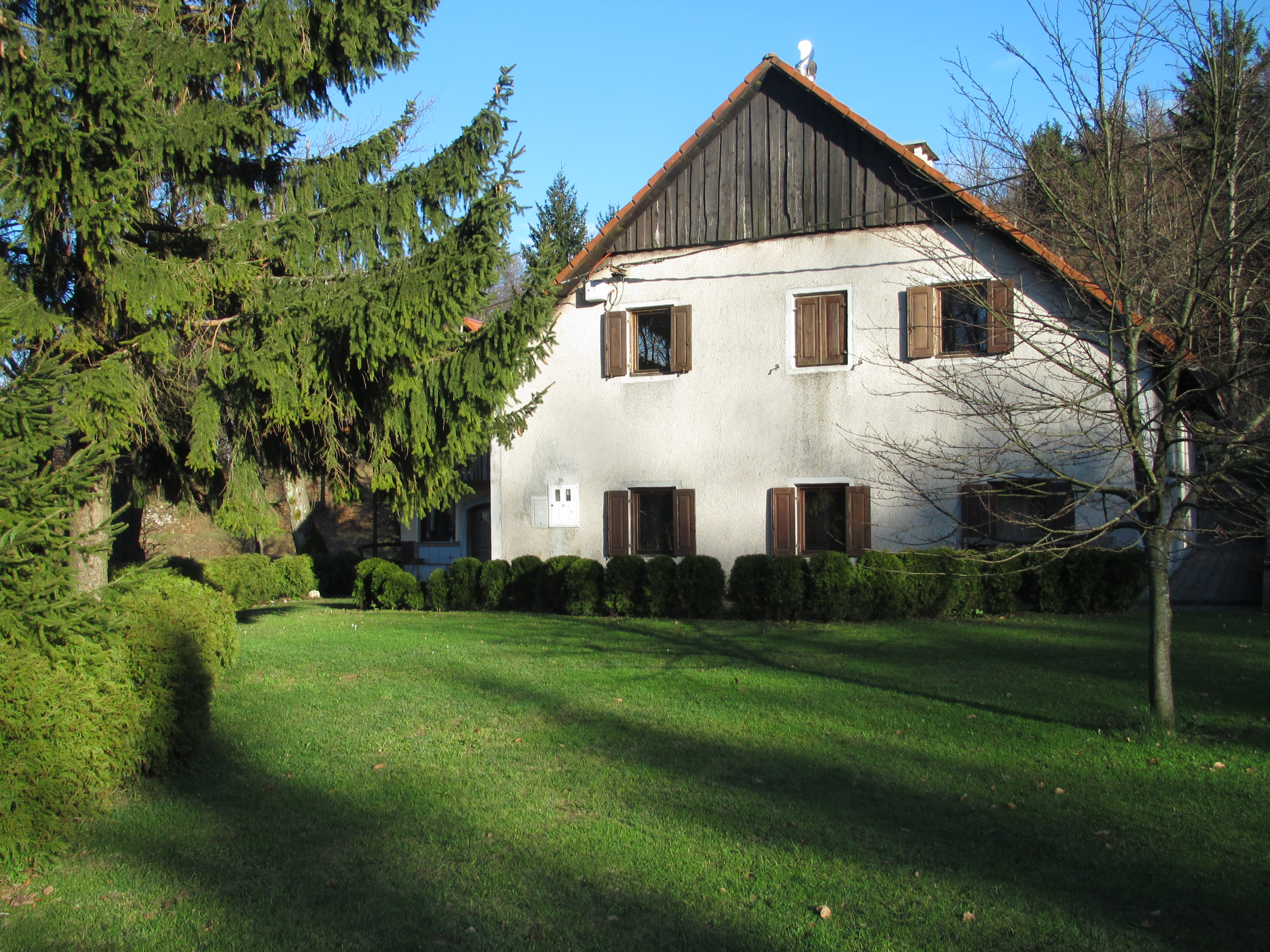
Peter farm, Strmec 6

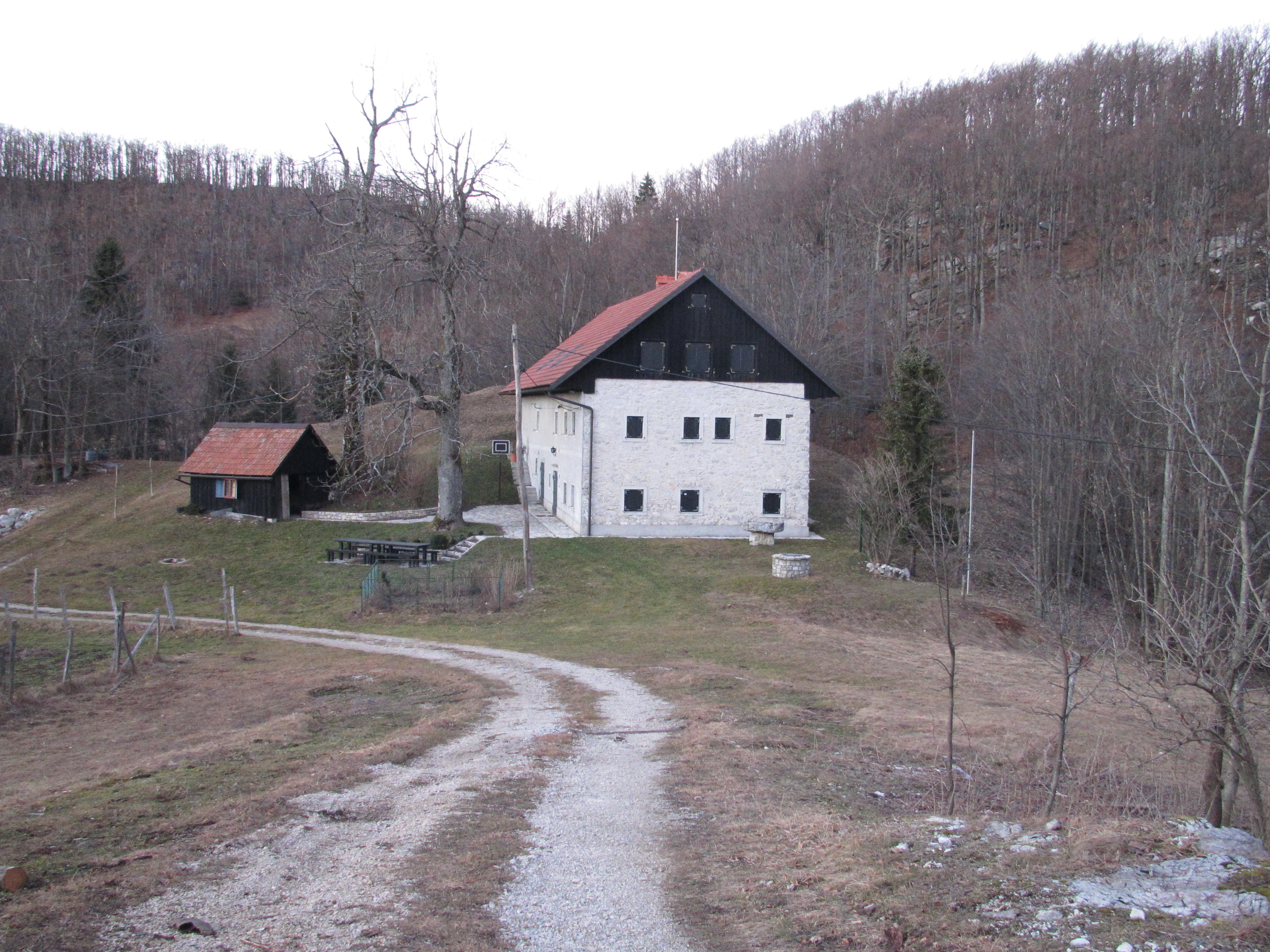
Skokec farm, Strmec 7

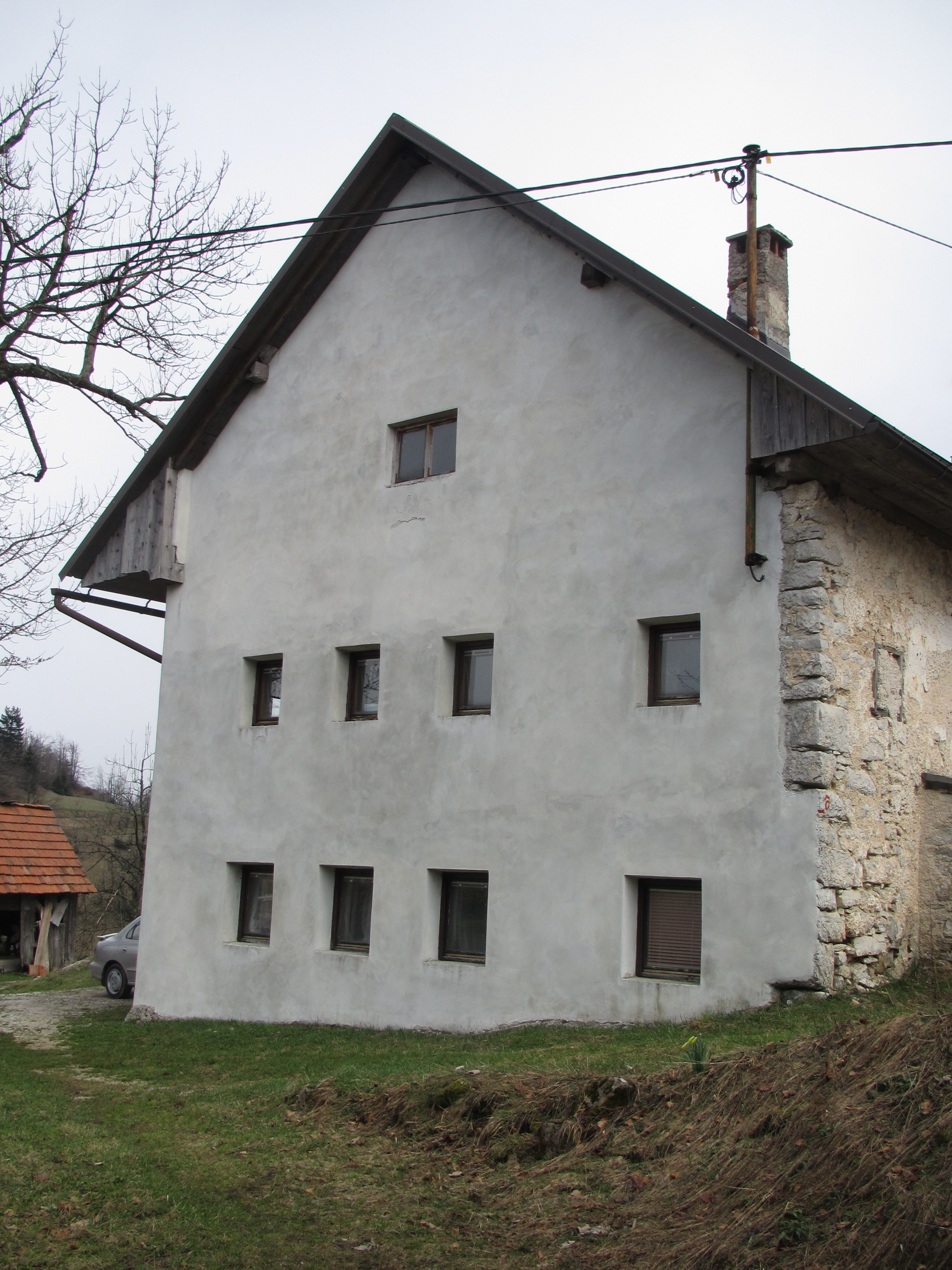
Štorc farm, Strmec 8

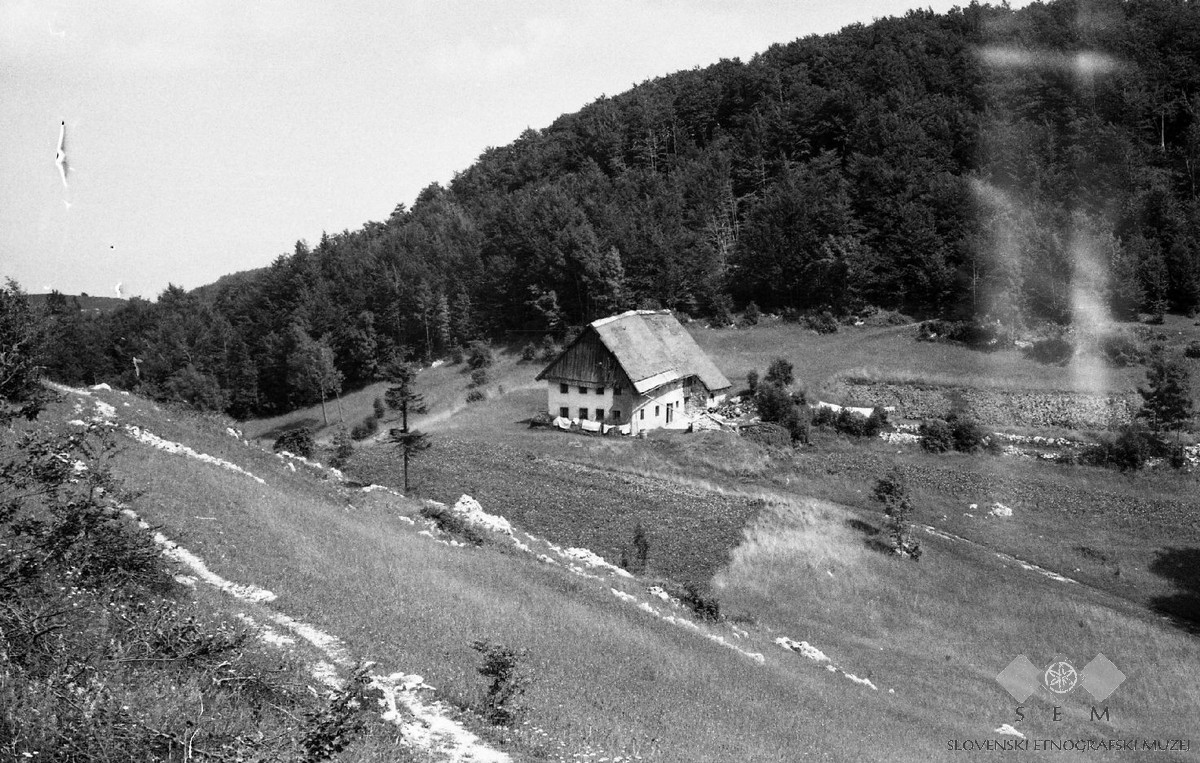
Skalar house, Strmec 9, 1959

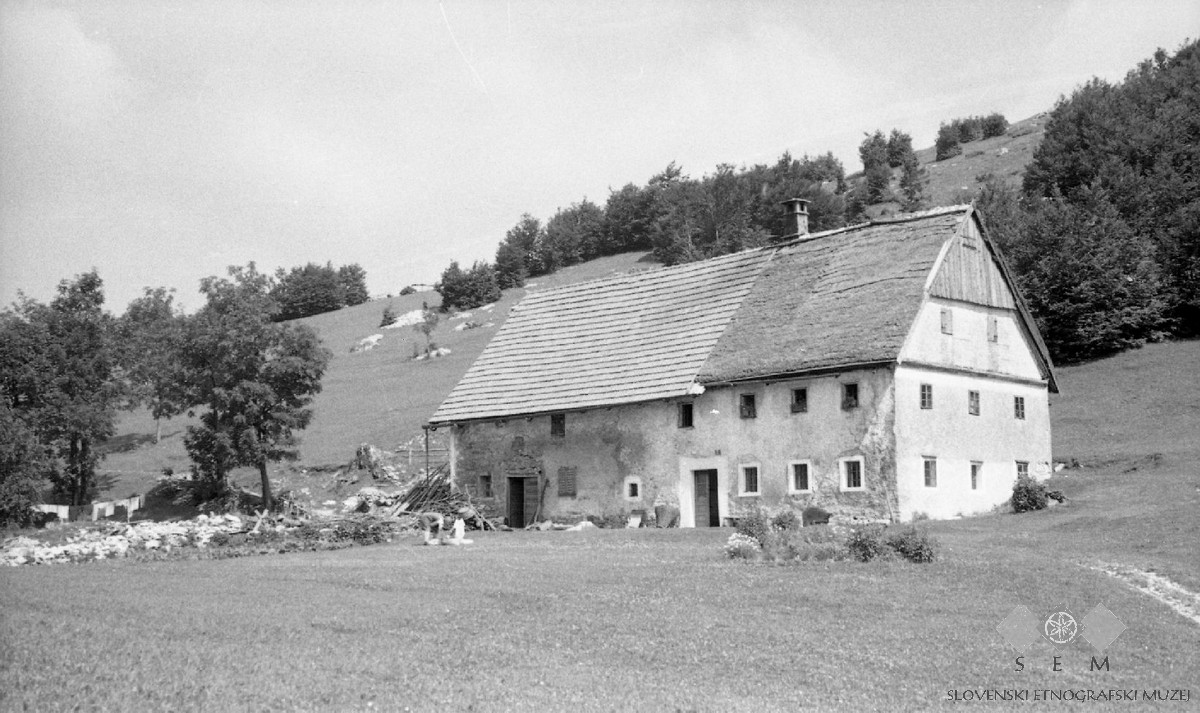
Zajec house, Strmec 11, 1959
