= Gorenja Kanomlja =

- Location in Slovenia
- Coordinates: 46°3′6.28″N 13°54′59.56″E
- Country: Slovenia
- Traditional region: Inner Carniola
- Statistical region: Gorizia
- Municipality: Idrija

Area
  - Total: 12.95 km^{2} (5.00 sq mi)
- Elevation: 555.8 m (1,823 ft)

Population (2002)
  - Total: 143

Gorenja Kanomlja (pronounced [ɡɔˈɾeːnja kaˈnoːmlja]; German: Oberkanomla) is a dispersed settlement in the hills northwest of Idrija in the traditional Inner Carniola region of Slovenia.
