= Masore =

- Location in Slovenia
- Coordinates: 46°4′6.39″N 13°58′14.77″E
- Country: Slovenia
- Traditional region: Inner Carniola
- Statistical region: Gorizia
- Municipality: Idrija

Area
  - Total: 8.38 km^{2} (3.24 sq mi)
- Elevation: 827.2 m (2,714 ft)

Population (2002)
  - Total: 67

Masore (pronounced [maˈsoːɾɛ]) is a dispersed settlement in the hills along the left bank of the Idrijca River in the Municipality of Idrija in the traditional Inner Carniola region of Slovenia.
