= Gore, Idrija =

Gore
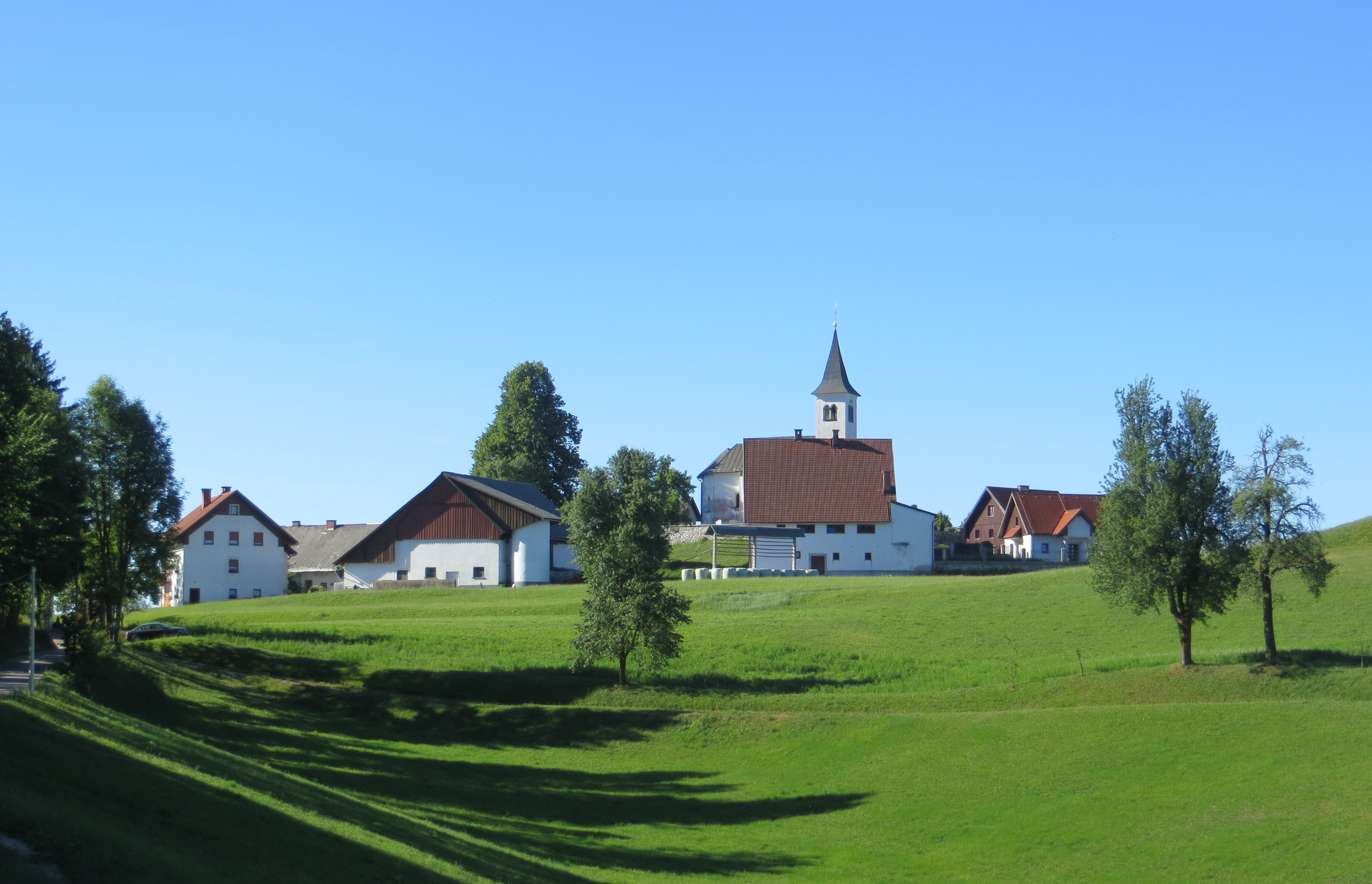

- Location in Slovenia
- Coordinates: 46°0′11.63″N 14°3′25.9″E
- Country: Slovenia
- Traditional region: Inner Carniola
- Statistical region: Gorizia
- Municipality: Idrija

Area
  - Total: 2.11 km^{2} (0.81 sq mi)
- Elevation: 832.5 m (2,731 ft)

Population (2002)
  - Total: 122

Gore (pronounced [ˈɡoːɾɛ], in older sources Gora, German: Tschudenberg) is a settlement in the hills east of Idrija in the traditional Inner Carniola region of Slovenia.

== Church ==
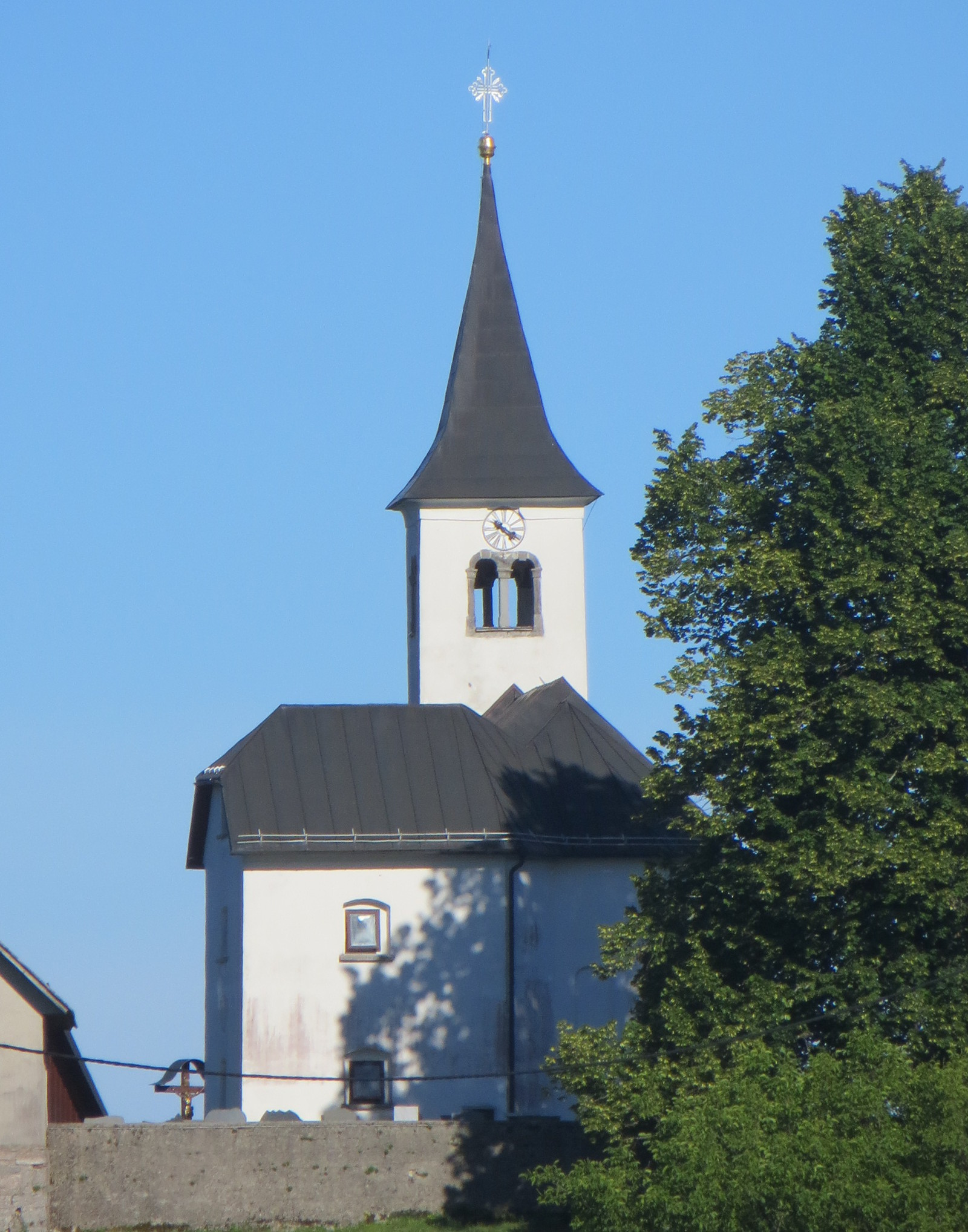
Mary Magdalene Church

The parish church in the settlement is dedicated to Mary Magdalene and belongs to the Koper Diocese.
