= Čekovnik =

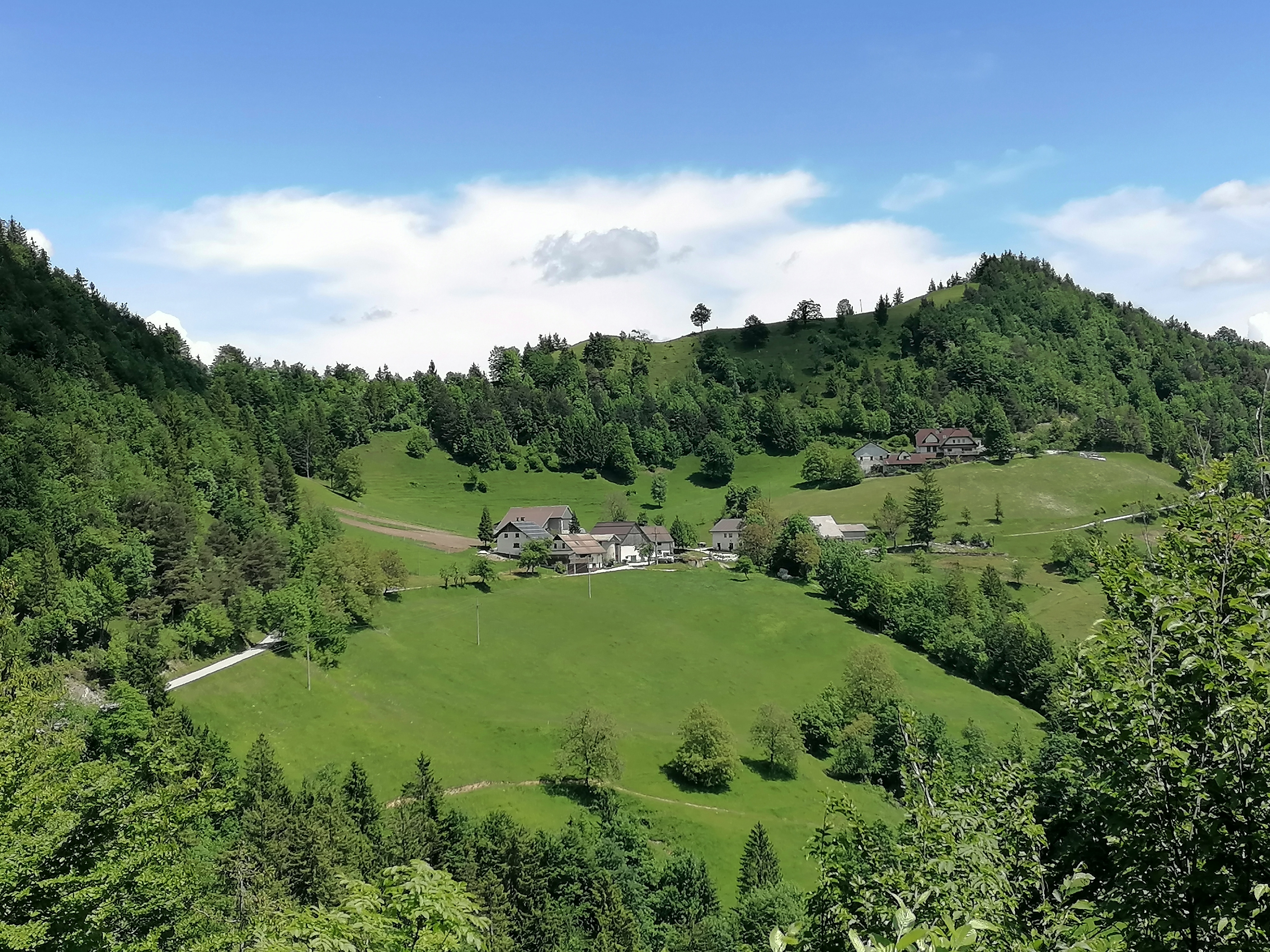

- Location in Slovenia
- Coordinates: 45°58′48.26″N 13°59′17.38″E
- Country: Slovenia
- Traditional region: Inner Carniola
- Statistical region: Gorizia
- Municipality: Idrija

Area
  - Total: 17.5 km^{2} (6.8 sq mi)
- Elevation: 647.4 m (2,124 ft)

Population (2002)
  - Total: 144

Čekovnik (pronounced [tʃɛˈkoːu̯nik]; German: Tschekaunik) is a dispersed settlement in the hills west of Idrija in the traditional Inner Carniola region of Slovenia.

== Geography ==
In addition to Čekovnik itself, the settlement includes (or included) the hamlets of Dolenja Bela (German: Unterbela), Gantarica, Gorenja Bela (German: Oberbela), Hleviše, Kočevše, Krekovše, Lom, Nikova, Osojni Vrh, Pri Trevnu, Riže, Tupa, and Vrh Bele.

== History ==
Farming in Čekovnik is meager, and traditionally the economy of the village was based on forestry. Until 1926, timber was harvested and floated down Šihtenpoh Creek. A wooden dam was built on the creek in 1868 to aid log driving. During the Second World War, the local farmers were involved in support activities for the Partisans' Pavla field hospital. A memorial to this activity was unveiled in 1966.

== Notable people ==
Notable people that were born or lived in Čekovnik include:

- Janez Gruden (1887–1930), translator and journalist
