= Idršek =

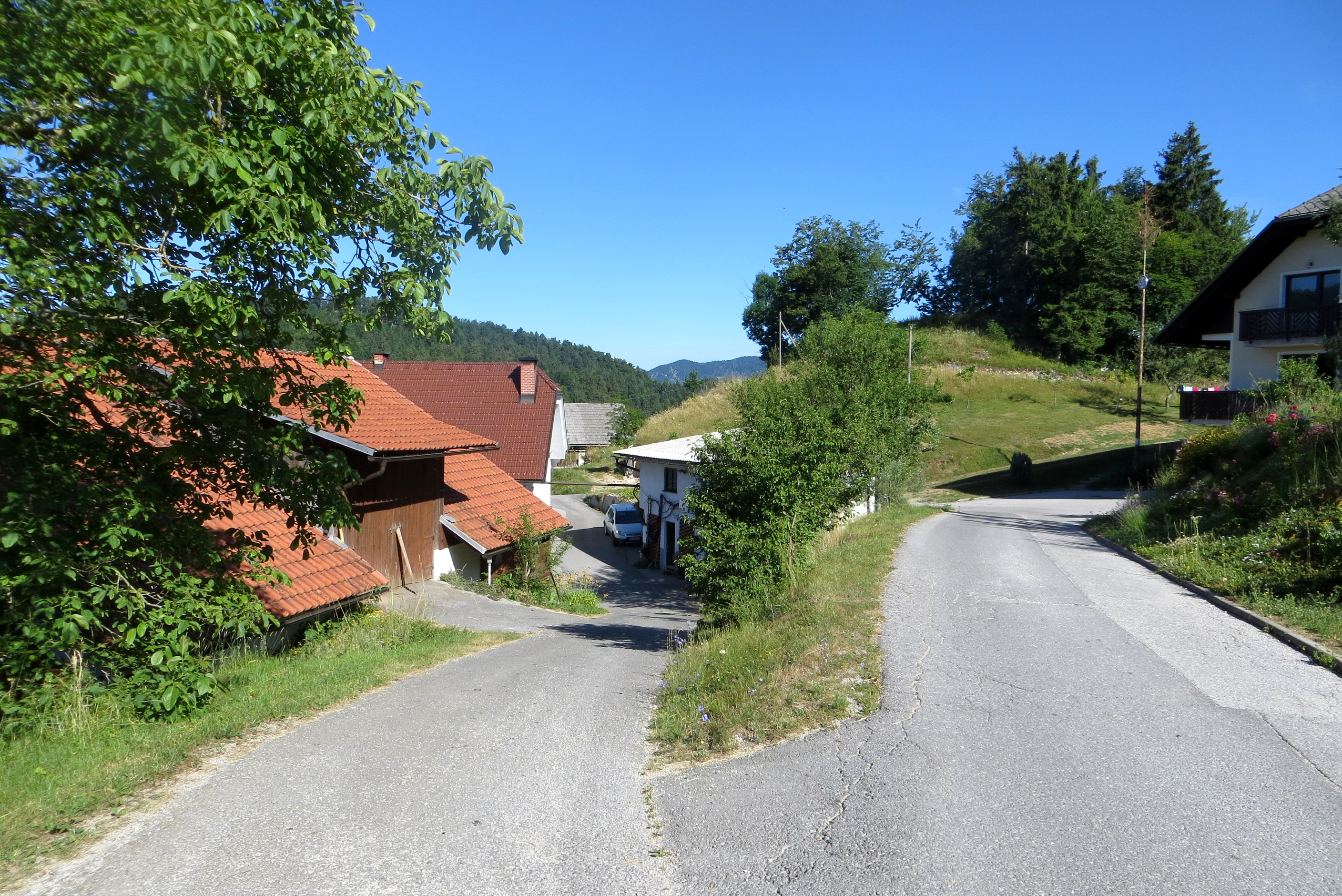

- Location in Slovenia
- Coordinates: 46°0′46.66″N 14°3′31.82″E
- Country: Slovenia
- Traditional region: Inner Carniola
- Statistical region: Gorizia
- Municipality: Idrija

Area
  - Total: 4.69 km^{2} (1.81 sq mi)
- Elevation: 723.6 m (2,374 ft)

Population (2002)
  - Total: 46

Idršek (pronounced [ˈiːdəɾʃək]; in older sources also Ideršček, German: Iderschek) is a small dispersed settlement in the hills northeast of Idrija in the traditional Inner Carniola region of Slovenia.
