= Spodnja Kanomlja =

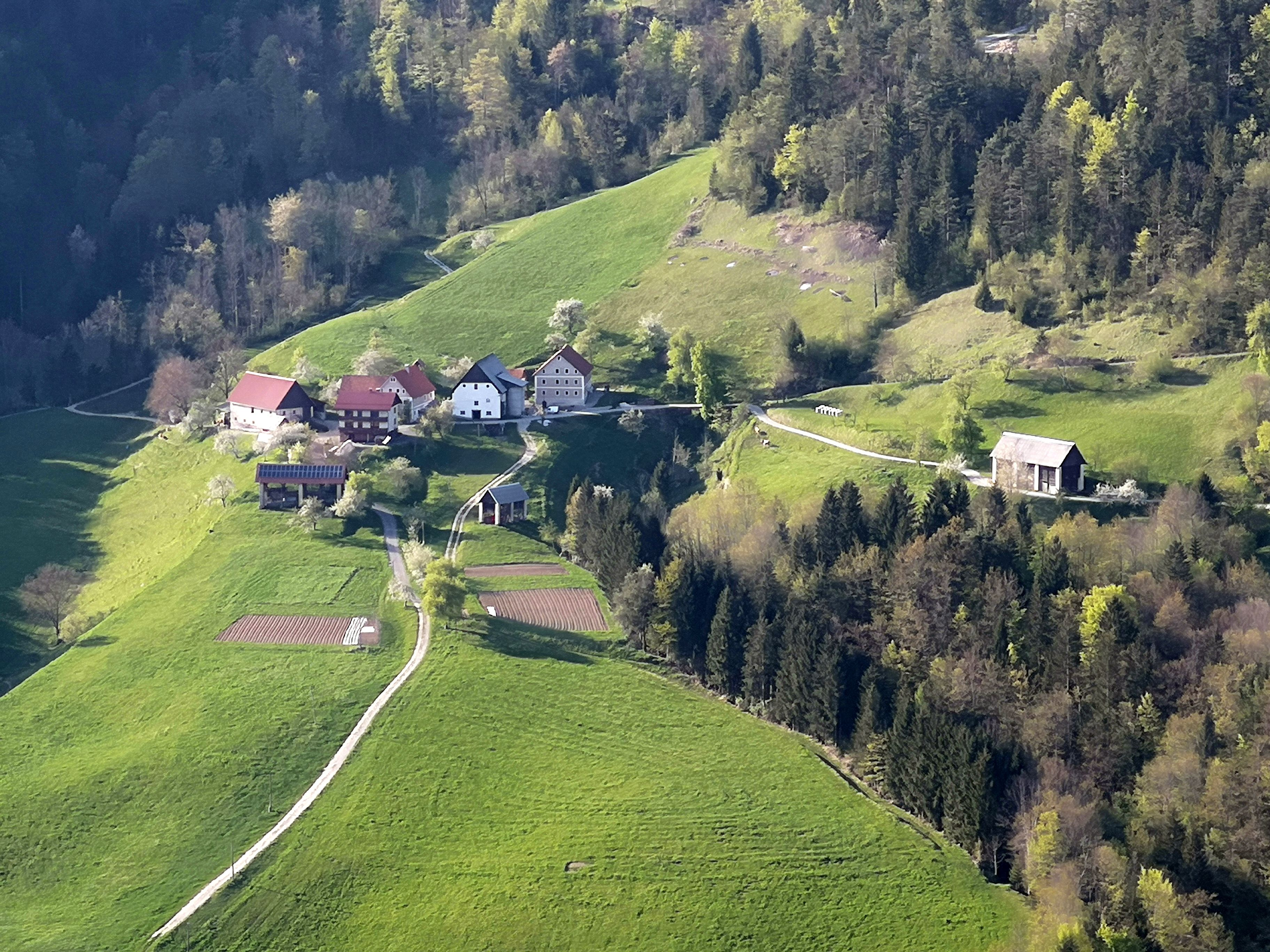

- Location in Slovenia
- Coordinates: 46°2′1.49″N 14°0′20.33″E
- Country: Slovenia
- Traditional region: Inner Carniola
- Statistical region: Gorizia
- Municipality: Idrija

Area
  - Total: 5.11 km^{2} (1.97 sq mi)
- Elevation: 358 m (1,175 ft)

Population (2002)
  - Total: 253

Spodnja Kanomlja (pronounced [ˈspoːdnja kaˈnoːmlja]; German: Unterkanomla) is a settlement immediately west of Spodnja Idrija in the Municipality of Idrija in the traditional Inner Carniola region of Slovenia. It lies in the valley of Kanomljica Creek, a small tributary of the Idrijca River.
