= Razpotje, Idrija =

Razpotje Kanomeljsko Razpotje (until 2006)
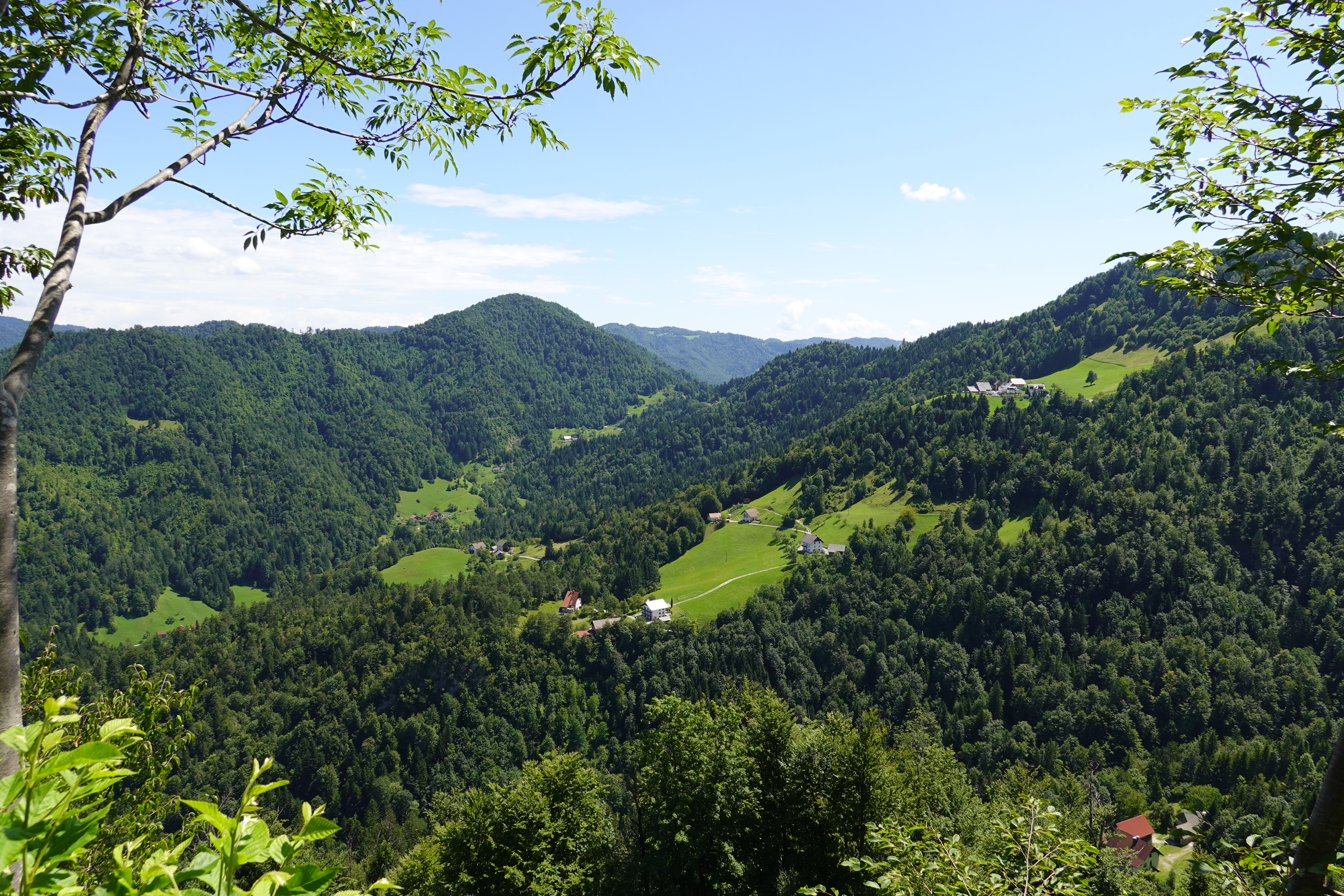

- Location in Slovenia
- Coordinates: 46°0′36″N 14°0′2″E
- Country: Slovenia
- Traditional region: Inner Carniola
- Statistical region: Gorizia
- Municipality: Idrija

Area
  - Total: 7.1 km^{2} (2.7 sq mi)
- Elevation: 550 m (1,800 ft)

Population (2023)
  - Total: 63

Razpotje (pronounced [ˈɾaːspɔtjɛ]) south of Srednja Kanomlja in the Municipality of Idrija, Slovenia. It is a popular excursion destination.

== Name ==
The name Razpotje literally means 'crossroads'; routes to Srednja Kanomlja, Idrija, and various hamlets meet in the village. The village was formerly known as Kanomeljsko Razpotje (literally, 'Kanomlja crossroads') when it was a hamlet of Srednja Kanomlja.

== History ==
The territory of Razpotje was part of Spodnja Kanomlja and Srednja Kanomlja until 2006, when it was made a separate village.
