= Spodnja Idrija =

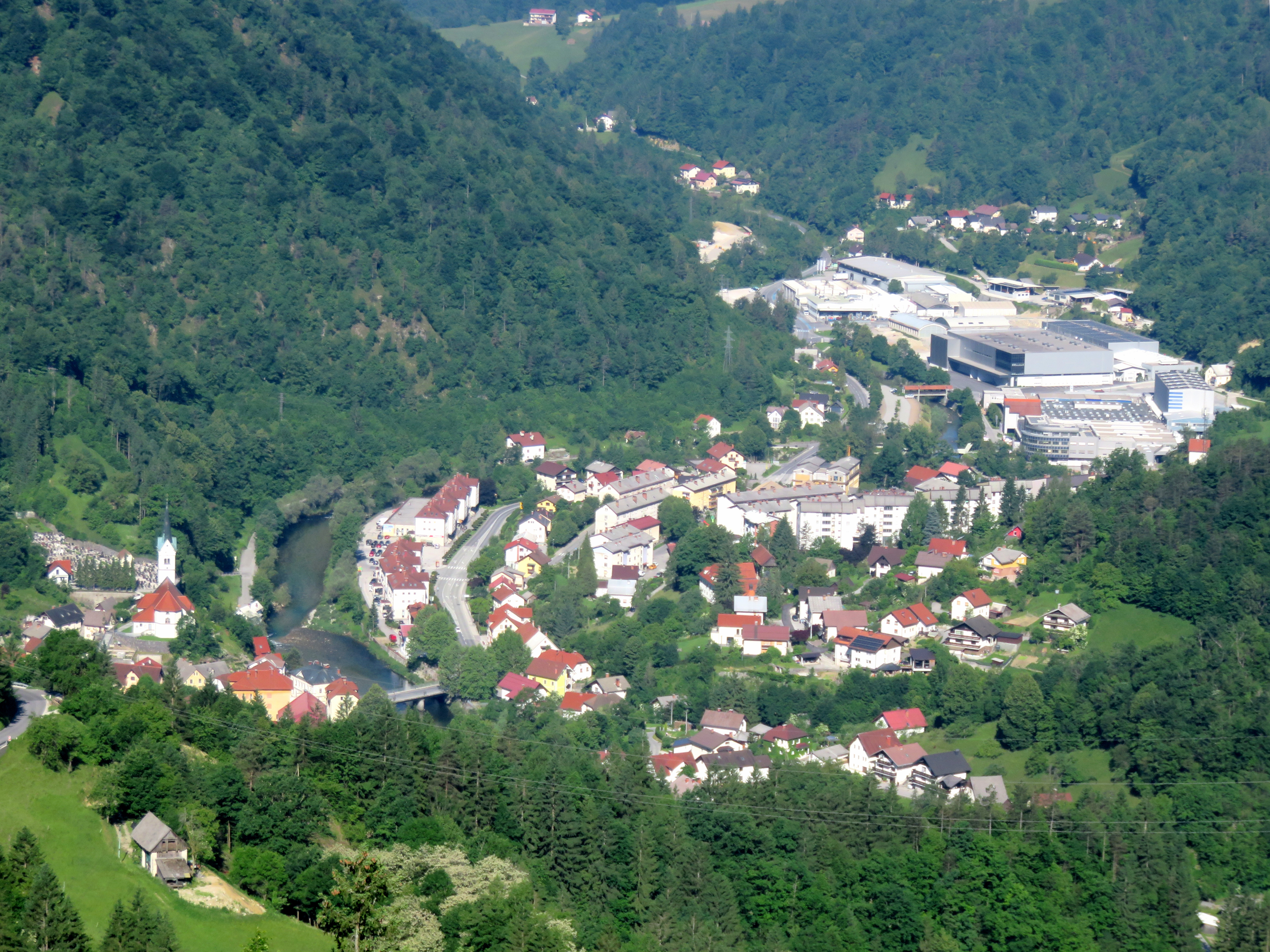

- Location in Slovenia
- Coordinates: 46°1′53.04″N 14°1′32.1″E
- Country: Slovenia
- Traditional region: Inner Carniola
- Statistical region: Gorizia
- Municipality: Idrija

Area
  - Total: 7.23 km^{2} (2.79 sq mi)
- Elevation: 314.9 m (1,033 ft)

Population (2002)
  - Total: 1,860

Spodnja Idrija (pronounced [ˈspoːdnja ˈiːdɾija], in older sources also Idrija pri Fari; German: Unteridria) is a settlement on the right bank of the Idrijca River in the Municipality of Idrija in the traditional Inner Carniola region of Slovenia.

== Name ==
The name Spodnja Idrija means 'lower Idrija'. This distinguished the town from Idrija, which lies upriver and about 20 meters (66 ft) higher in elevation, and which was formerly known as Zgornja Idrija 'upper Idrija' (German: Oberidria).

== Church ==
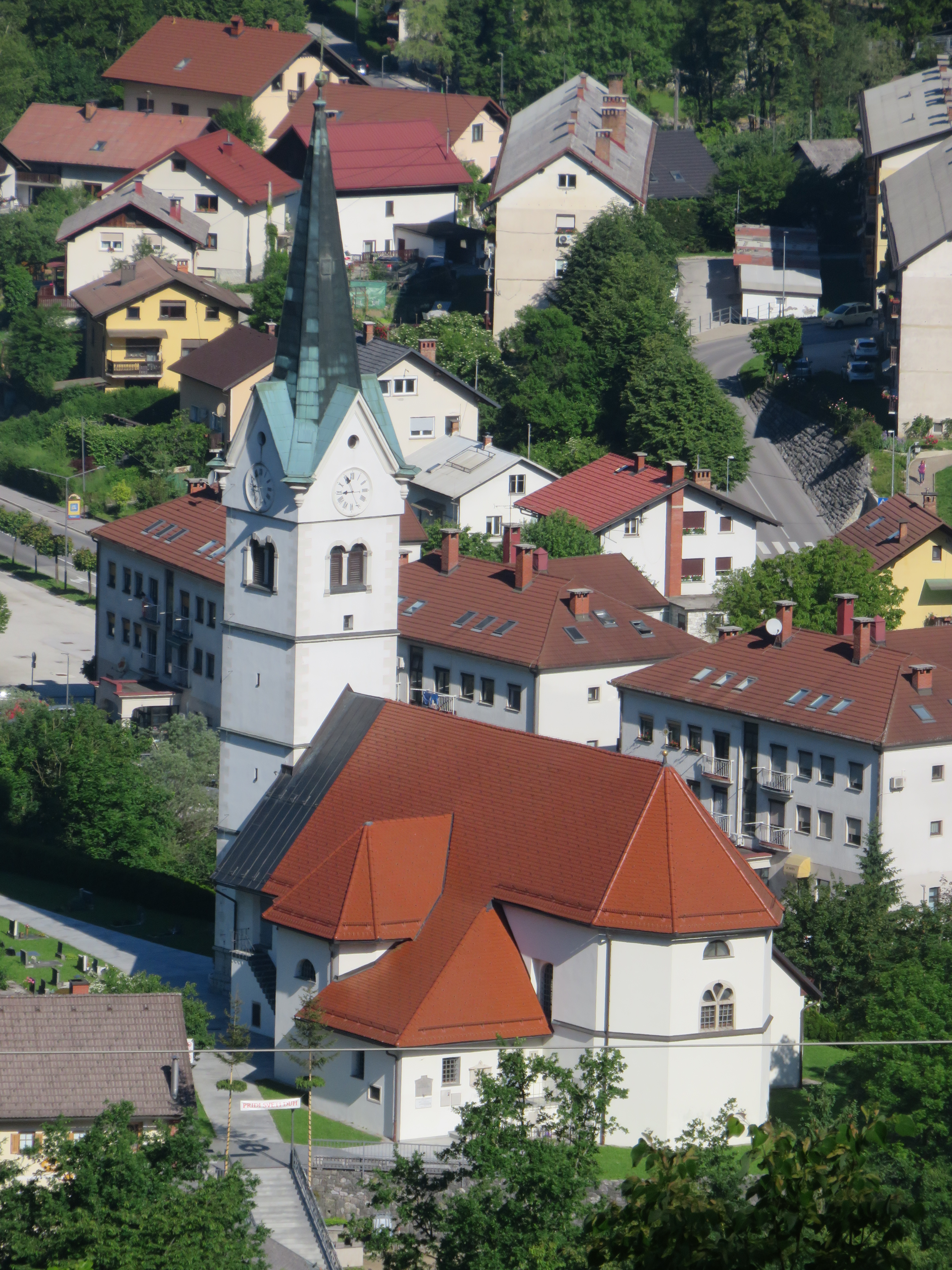
Assumption Church

The parish church in the settlement is dedicated to the Assumption of Mary and belongs to the Koper Diocese. It is locally known as the Church of Mary on the Rock (Slovene: Cerkev Marije na Skalci). A chapel is mentioned on the site in written sources from 1132. The church was built in the 15th century and rebuilt around 1674 in the Baroque style.
