= Municipality of Luče =

Municipality of Slovenia

Municipality of Luče Občina Luče
- Municipality
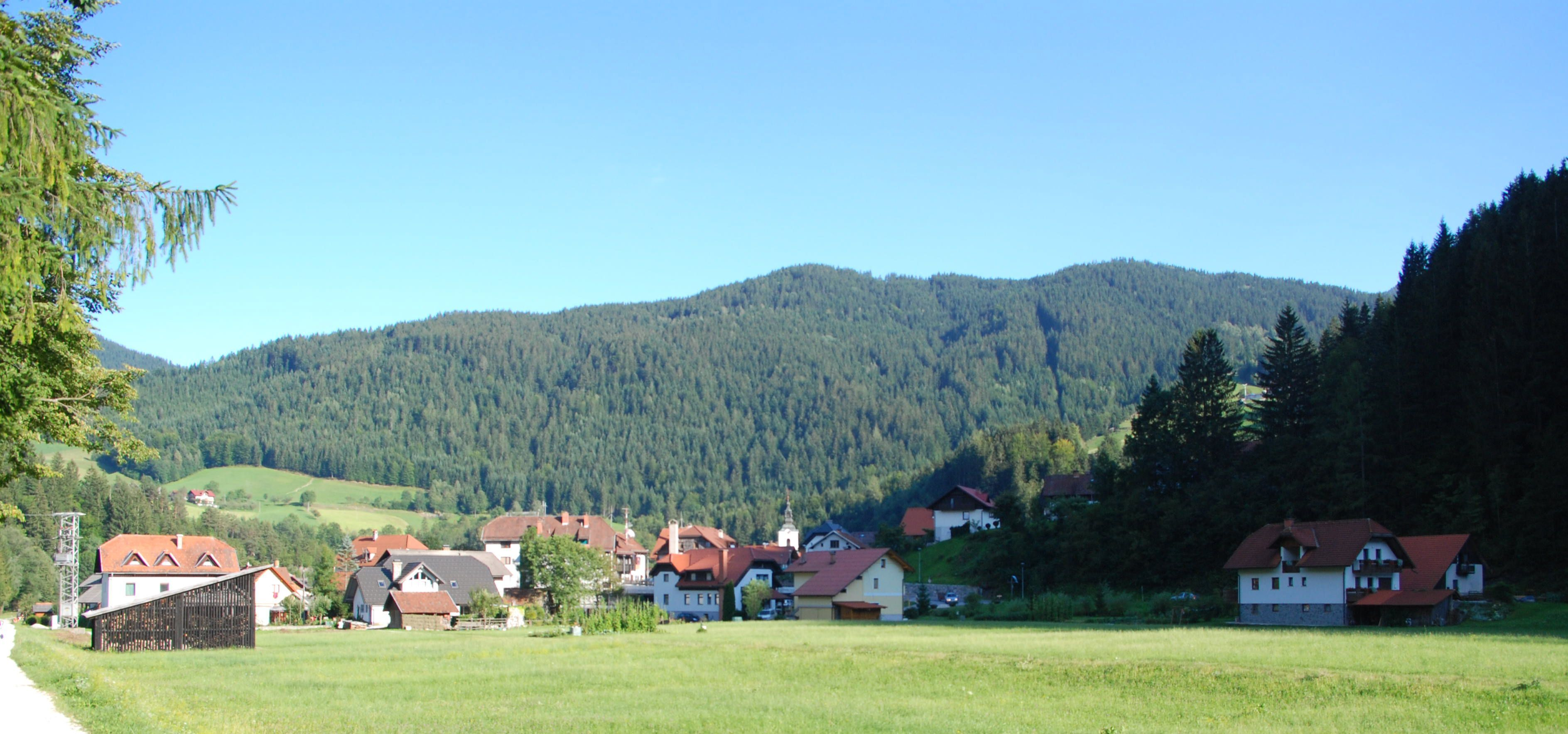

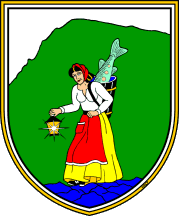
- Coat of arms

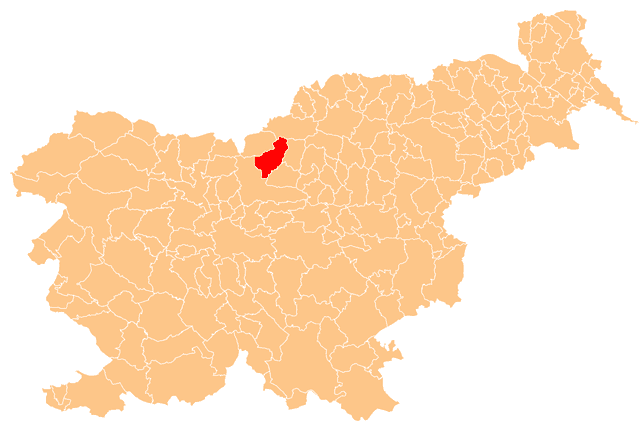
- Location of the Municipality of Luče in Slovenia
- Coordinates: 46°13′N 14°26′E
- Country: Slovenia

Government
  - Mayor: Klavdij Strmčnik (Independent)

Area
  - Total: 109.5 km^{2} (42.3 sq mi)

Population (2002)
  - Total: 1,609
  - Density: 14.69/km^{2} (38.06/sq mi)
- Time zone: UTC+01 (CET)
  - Summer (DST): UTC+02 (CEST)
- Website: www.luce.si

The Municipality of Luče (pronounced [ˈluːtʃɛ], Slovene: Občina Luče) is a municipality in northern Slovenia. It gets its name from the largest settlement and administrative seat of the municipality, Luče.

== Settlements ==
In addition to the municipal seat of Luče, the municipality also includes the following settlements:

- Konjski Vrh
- Krnica
- Podveža
- Podvolovljek
- Raduha
- Strmec
