= Krnice pri Novakih =

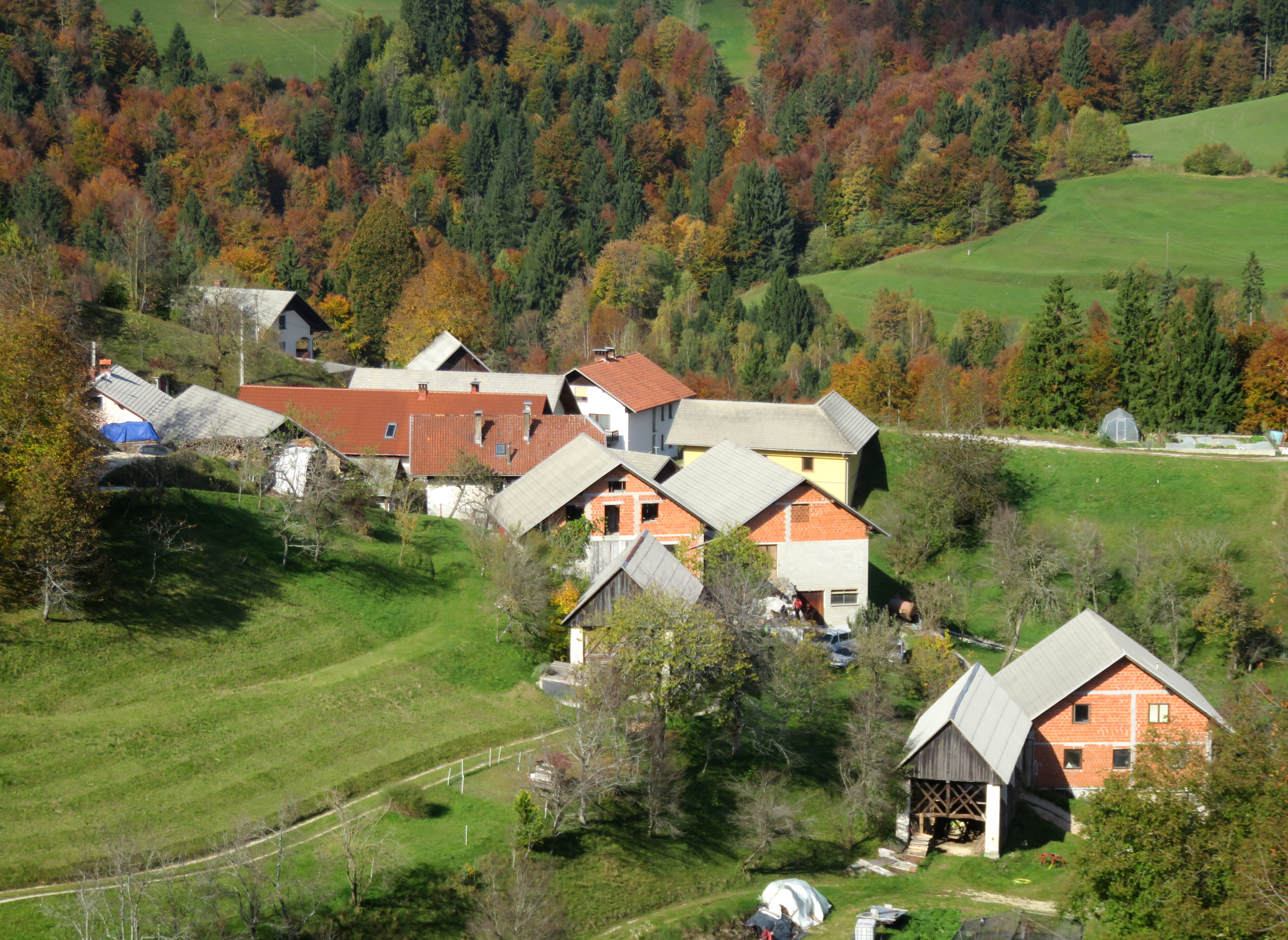

- Location in Slovenia
- Coordinates: 46°8′30.78″N 14°4′4.94″E
- Country: Slovenia
- Traditional region: Upper Carniola
- Statistical region: Upper Carniola
- Municipality: Gorenja Vas–Poljane

Area
  - Total: 0.94 km^{2} (0.36 sq mi)
- Elevation: 813.2 m (2,668 ft)

Population (2020)
  - Total: 32
  - Density: 34/km^{2} (88/sq mi)

Krnice pri Novakih (pronounced [kəɾˈniːtsɛ pɾi nɔˈʋaːkix]; German: Kernitze) is a small settlement in the hills northwest of Gorenja Vas in the Municipality of Gorenja Vas–Poljane in the Upper Carniola region of Slovenia.

== Name ==
Krnice pri Novakih was attested in historical sources as Chorniczach in 1291, Carnitz in 1318, Karnicz in 1414, and Karnitzach in 1500, among other variations of the name. The name literally means 'Krnice near Novaki', distinguishing the village from Ledinske Krnice and Idrijske Krnice, which lie about 12 kilometers (7.5 mi) to the south and southwest, respectively. The plural place name Krnice (and the corresponding singular Krnica) is found several times in Slovenia and is derived from the common noun krnica 'cirque, bowl', referring to the local geography. The northeastern and eastern slope of Mah Hill, which the village stands on, is incised by several cirque-like landforms.

== Geography ==
Krnice pri Novakih lies in a basin-like area on the northeast edge of Mah Hill (elevation: 856 meters or 2,808 feet) above the gorge of Kopačnica Creek. Krnice Hill (Slovene: Krniški kovk, elevation: 883 meters or 2,897 feet) rises southwest of the village. There are extensive hayfields in the settlement, and Skrajnik Creek (Slovene: Skrajniška grapa), a tributary of Kopačnica Creek, flows below the village to the north. The village has road connections to Gorenji Novaki, Kopačnica, and Leskovica.

== History ==
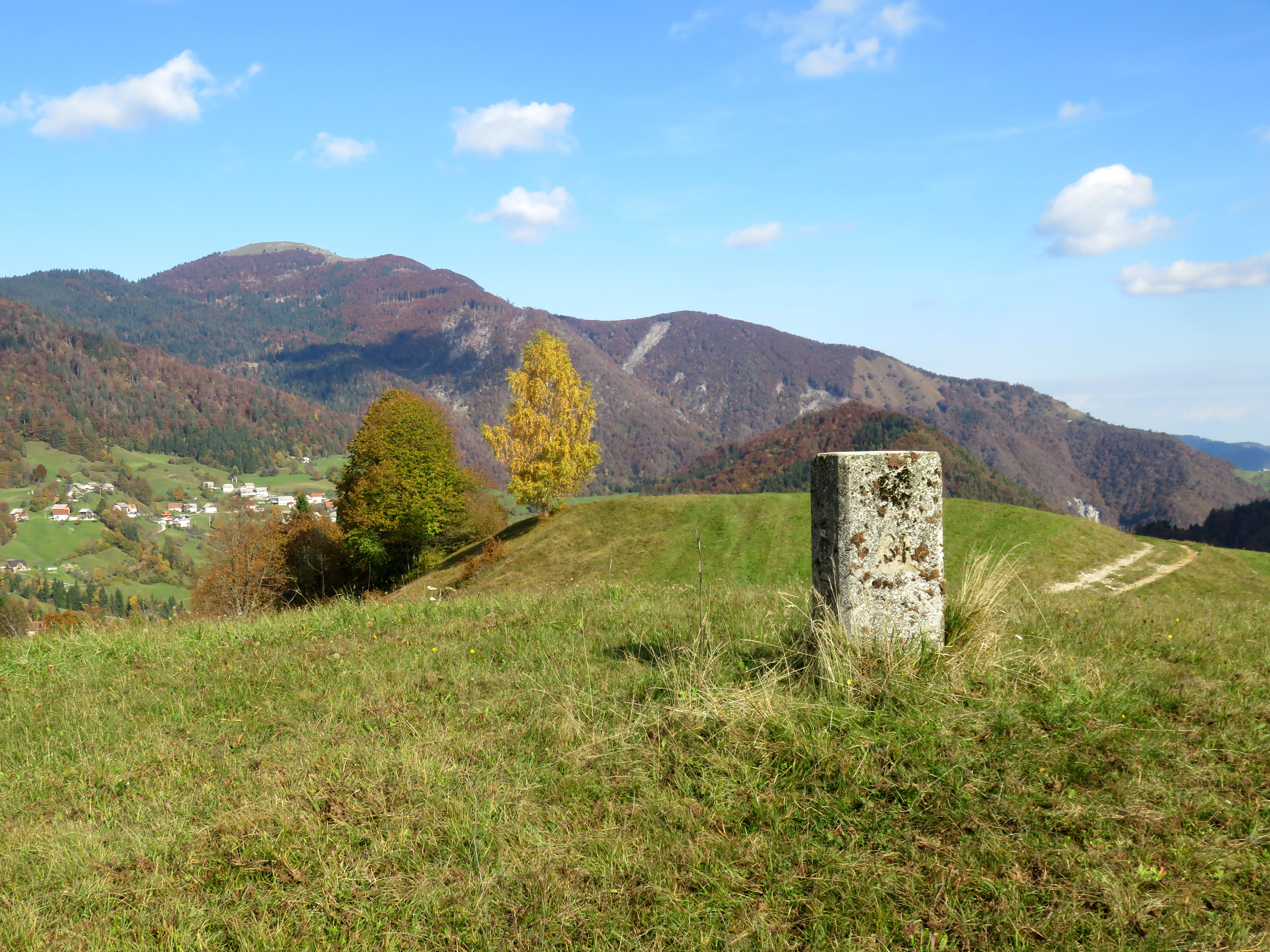
Rapallo border stone above Krnice pri Novakih

Until the end of the Second World War, Krnice pri Novakih stood on the Italian side of the Rapallo border between Italy and Yugoslavia. A border stone marking the division between sectors 33 and 34 of the border stands on Mah Hill above the village.
