= Krnice =

Krnice may refer to several settlements in Slovenia:

- Idrijske Krnice, a settlement in the Municipality of Idrija (known as (Idrske) Krnice until 1952/1980)
- Krnice, Hrastnik, a settlement in the Municipality of Hrastnik
- Krnice pri Novakih, a settlement in the Municipality of Gorenja Vas–Poljane
- Ledinske Krnice, a settlement in the Municipality of Idrija (known as Krnice until 1952)
