= Veža =

Veža may refer to:

- Mladen Veža, a Croatian painter
- Dleskovec Plateau, a plateau in Slovenia
