= Novine, Cerkno =

Novine
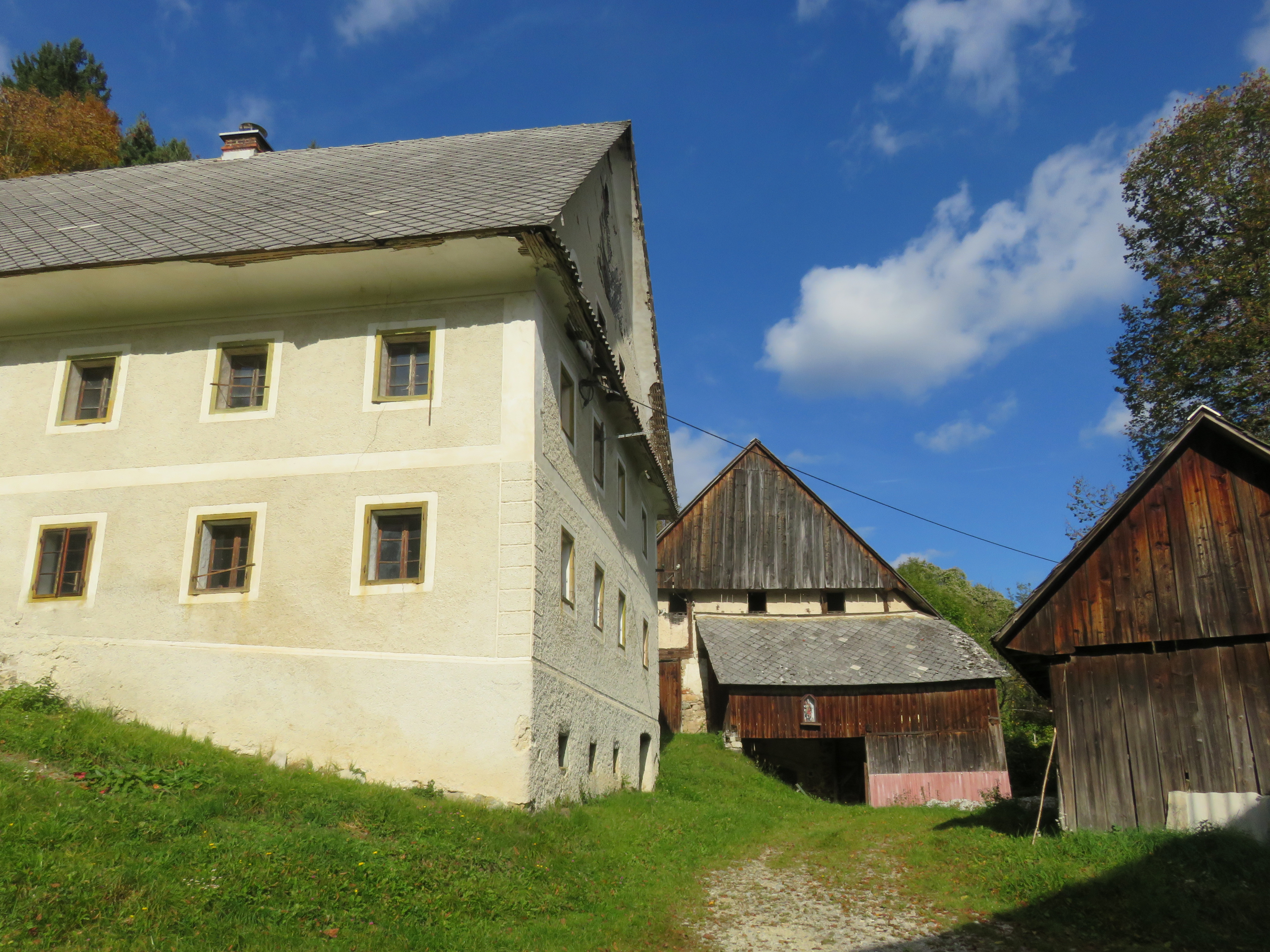

- Location in Slovenia
- Coordinates: 46°08′07″N 14°02′21″E
- Country: Slovenia
- Traditional region: Littoral
- Statistical region: Gorizia
- Municipality: Cerkno
- Elevation: 797 m (2,615 ft)

Novine (pronounced [nɔˈʋiːnɛ]) is a former village in northwestern Slovenia in the Municipality of Cerkno. It is now part of the village of Podpleče. It is part of the traditional region of Upper Carniola and is now included in the Upper Carniola Statistical Region.

== Geography ==
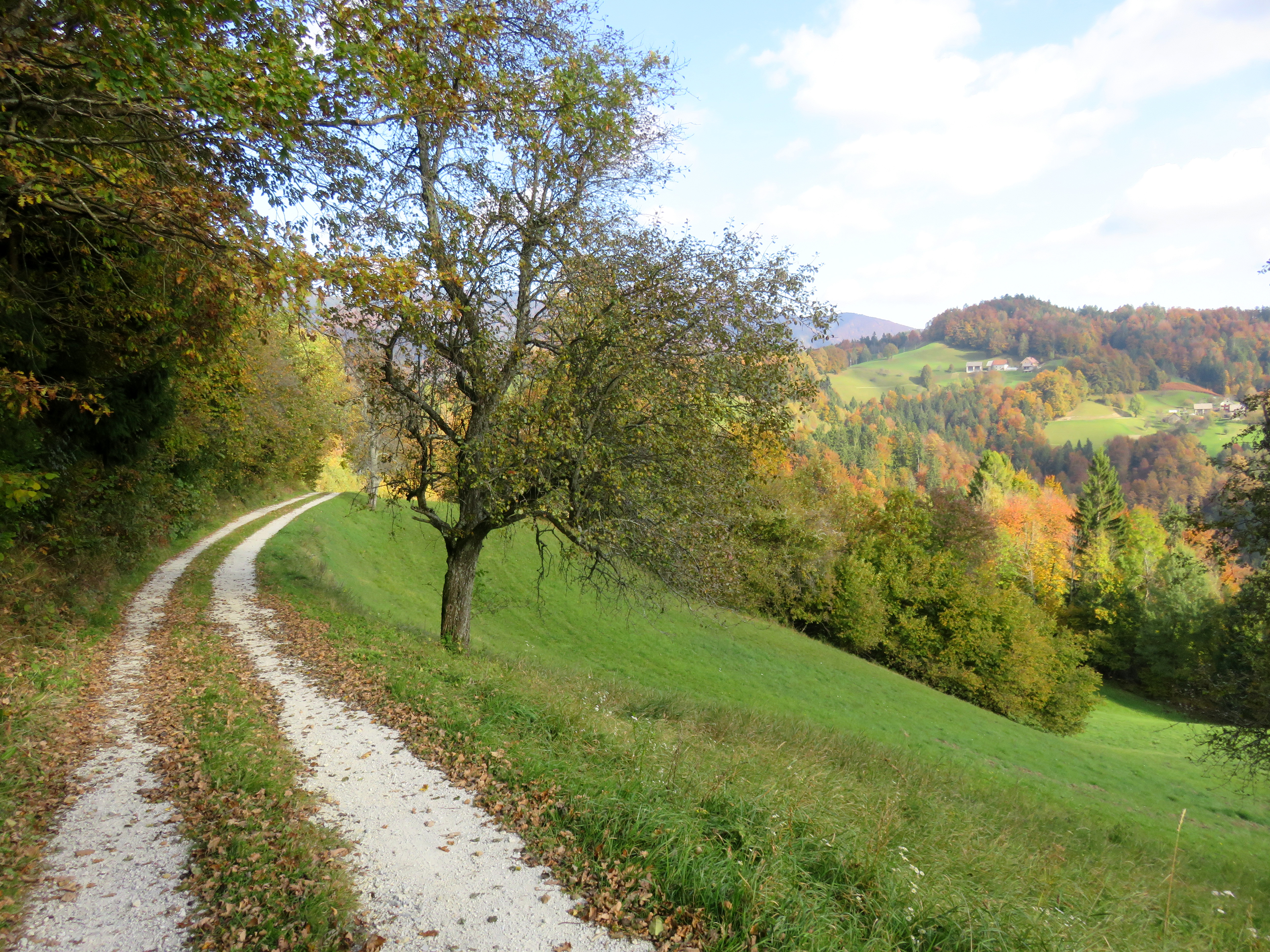
Road to Novine

Novine lies in the hills above the right bank of Mrovlje Creek (Slovene: Mrovljeva grapa), a tributary of Podplečica Creek, with access from a side road between Podpleče to the southwest and Kopačnica to the east.

== Name ==
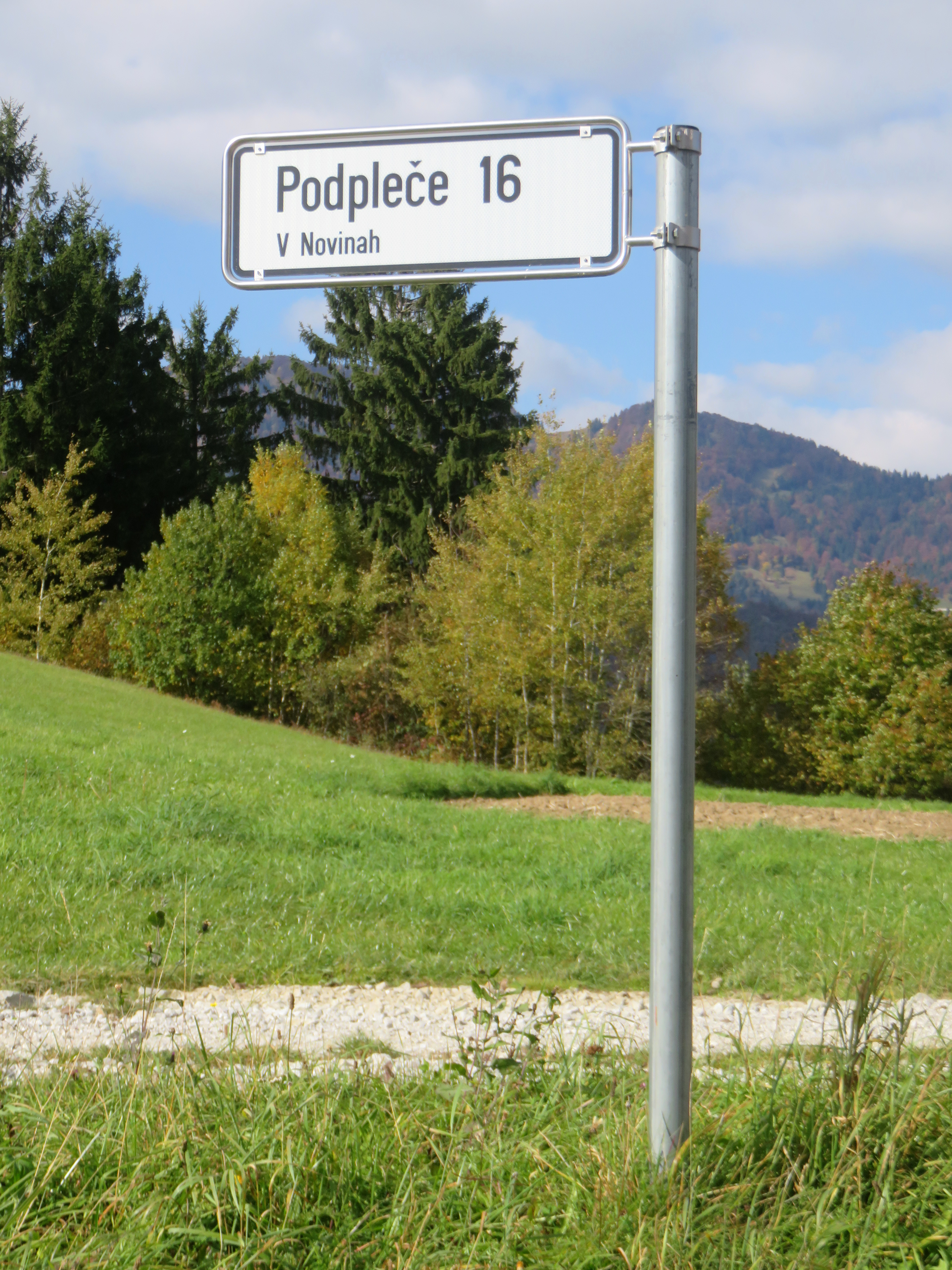
Sign for Novine

Novine was attested in historical sources as Nowinach in 1560 and Nouinach in 1584. Both attestations are in the locative case.

== History ==
Novine was established as a settlement by 1560. Novine was annexed by the village of Gorenji Novaki in 1953, ending its existence as an independent settlement. It later became part of Podpleče.
