= Nova Oselica =

- Village
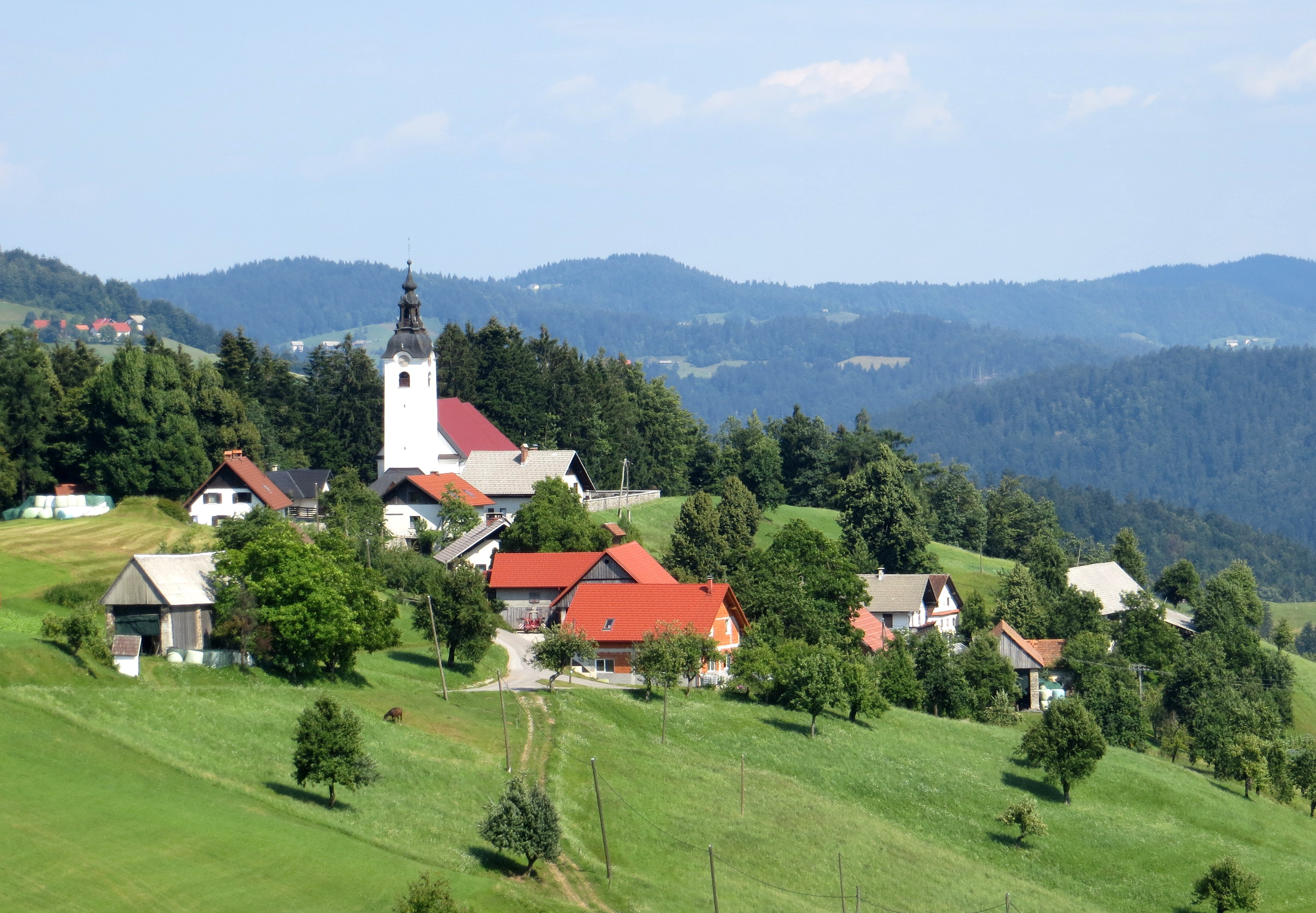

- Location in Slovenia
- Coordinates: 46°5′38.55″N 14°1′36.1″E
- Country: Slovenia
- Traditional region: Upper Carniola
- Statistical region: Upper Carniola
- Municipality: Gorenja Vas–Poljane

Area
  - Total: 0.8 km^{2} (0.31 sq mi)
- Elevation: 808.9 m (2,654 ft)

Population (2020)
  - Total: 17
  - Density: 21/km^{2} (55/sq mi)

Nova Oselica (pronounced [ˈnɔːʋa ˈoːsɛlitsa]; German: Neuoßlitz) is a small settlement in the Municipality of Gorenja Vas–Poljane in the Upper Carniola region of Slovenia.

== Name ==
The name Nova Oselica literally means 'new Oselica' (in contrast to nearby Stara Oselica 'old Oselica'). The origin of the name Oselica is uncertain, but is likely derived from the common noun osel 'donkey' (or from the surname Osel derived from that noun). A less likely possibility, argued against by medieval attestations, is that the name is derived from the plant name oselica 'pepper-saxifrage'. The toponym Oslica has the same etymology.

== Church ==
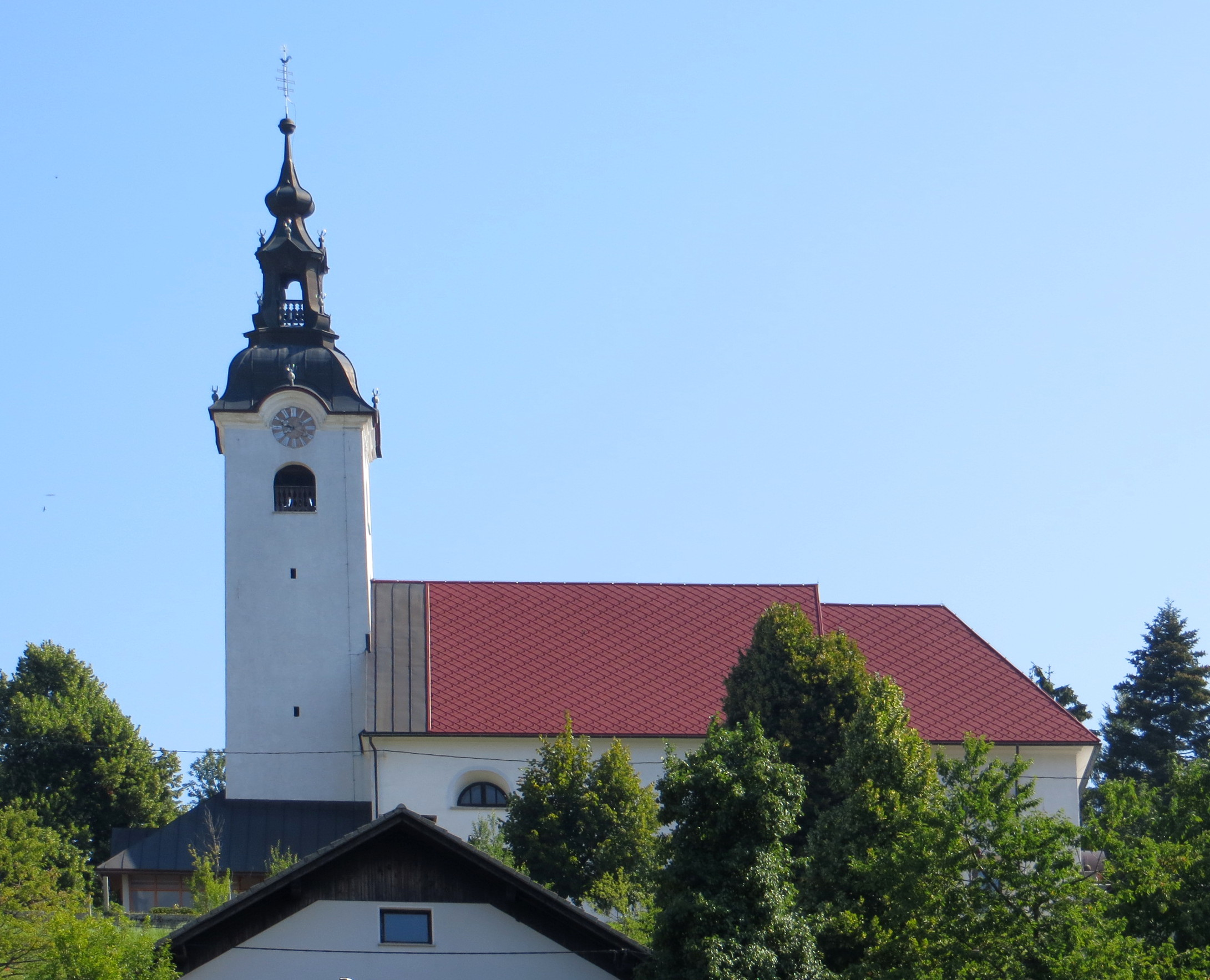
Saint John of Nepomuk Church

The local church is dedicated to Saint John of Nepomuk. It was built on the site of an older church in the mid-18th century. The main altar is made of stone and dates to 1818.
