= Raduha, Luče =

Raduha
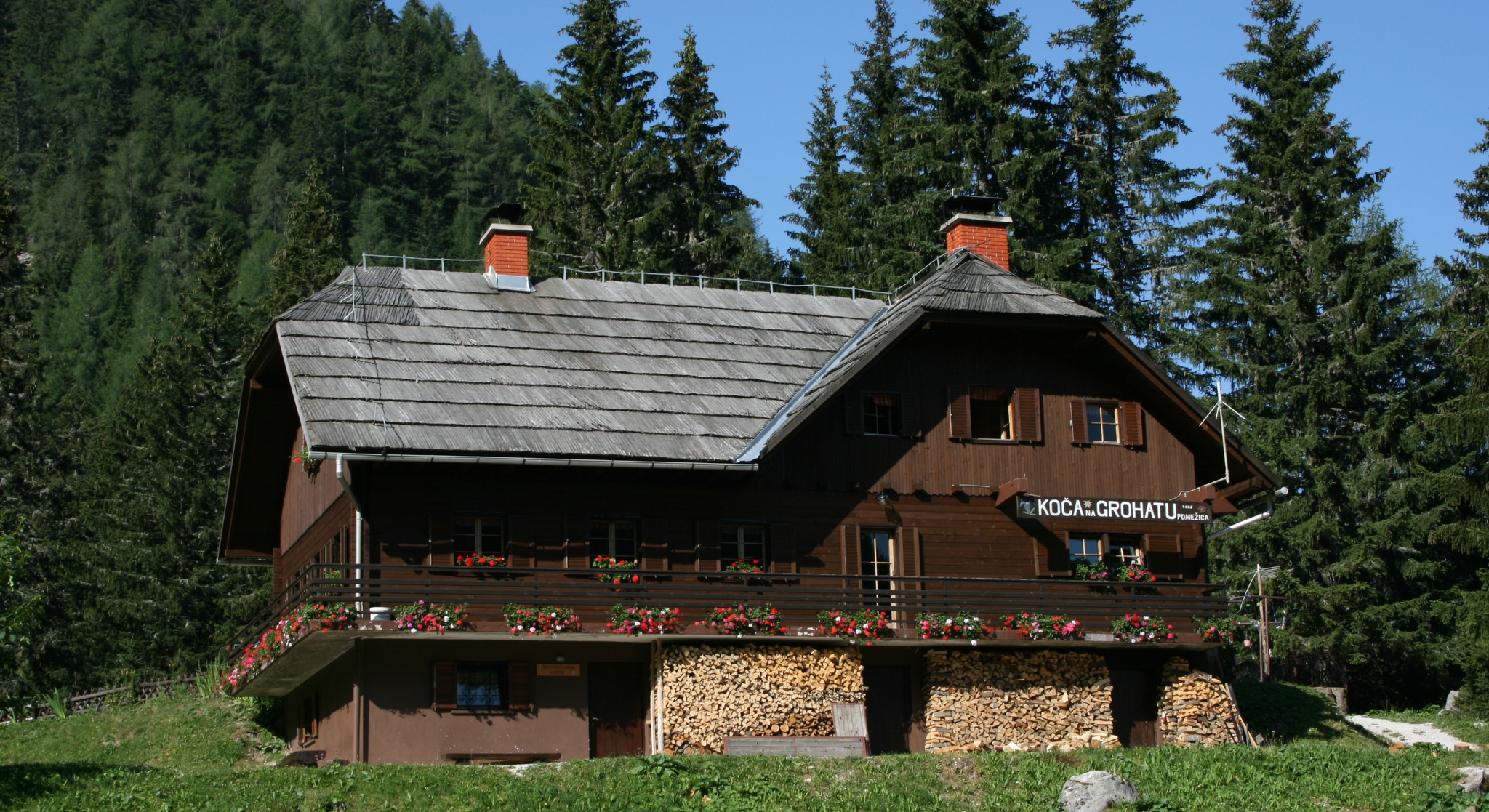
- A mountain lodge near Raduha

- Location in Slovenia
- Coordinates: 46°22′4.14″N 14°44′53.75″E
- Country: Slovenia
- Traditional region: Styria
- Statistical region: Savinja
- Municipality: Luče

Area
  - Total: 10.07 km^{2} (3.89 sq mi)
- Elevation: 829.3 m (2,721 ft)

Population (2019)
  - Total: 225

Raduha (pronounced [ˈɾaːduxa]) is a dispersed settlement on the southern slopes of Mount Raduha in the Municipality of Luče in northern Slovenia. The area belongs to the traditional region of Styria and is now included in the Savinja Statistical Region.
