= Tičje Brdo =

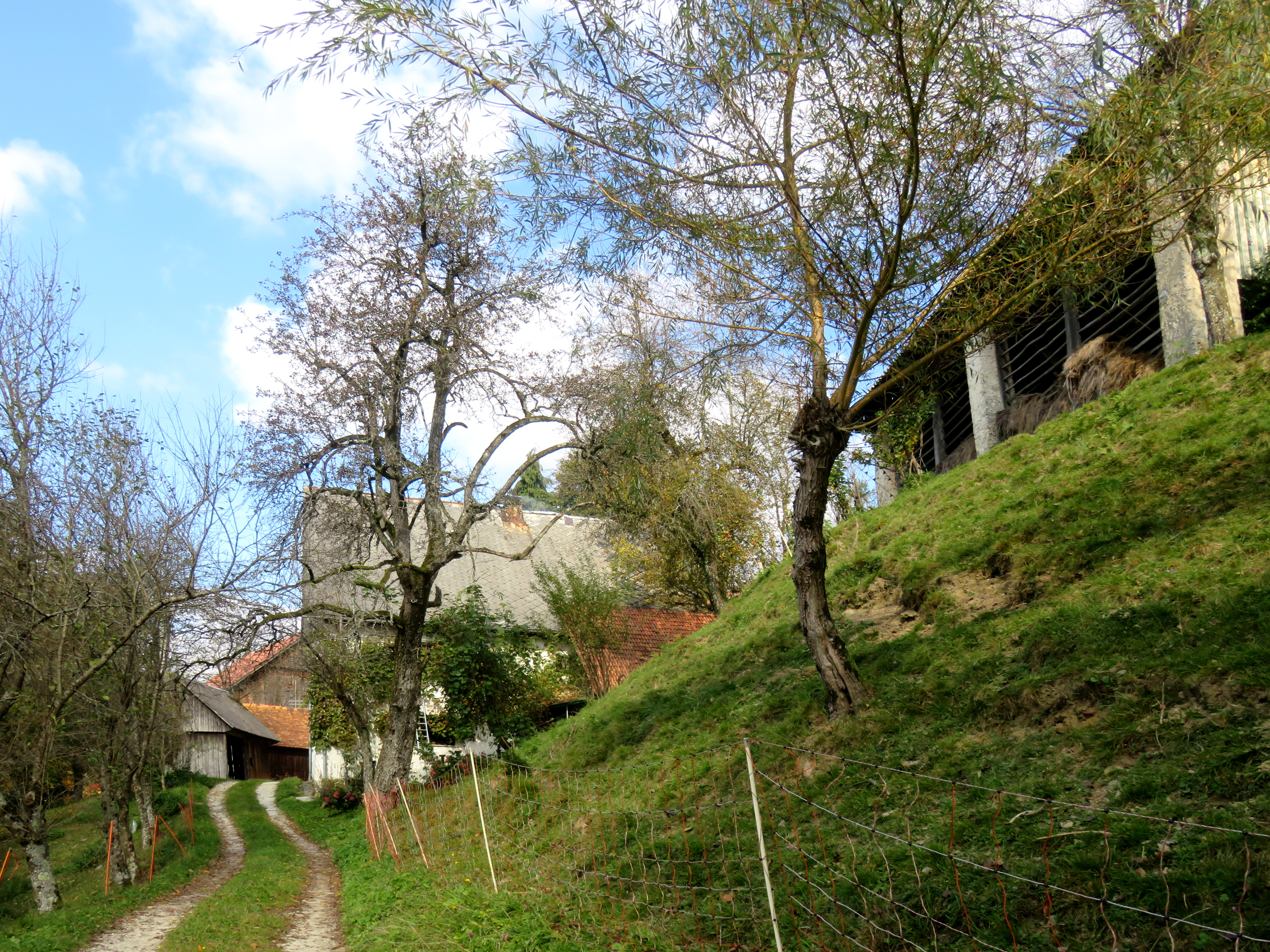

- Location in Slovenia
- Coordinates: 46°07′55″N 14°03′05″E
- Country: Slovenia
- Traditional region: Littoral
- Statistical region: Gorizia
- Municipality: Cerkno
- Elevation: 767 m (2,516 ft)

Tičje Brdo (pronounced [ˈtiːtʃjɛ ˈbəɾdɔ]) is a former village in northwestern Slovenia in the Municipality of Cerkno. It is now part of the village of Gorenji Novaki. It is part of the traditional region of Upper Carniola and is now included in the Upper Carniola Statistical Region.

== Geography ==
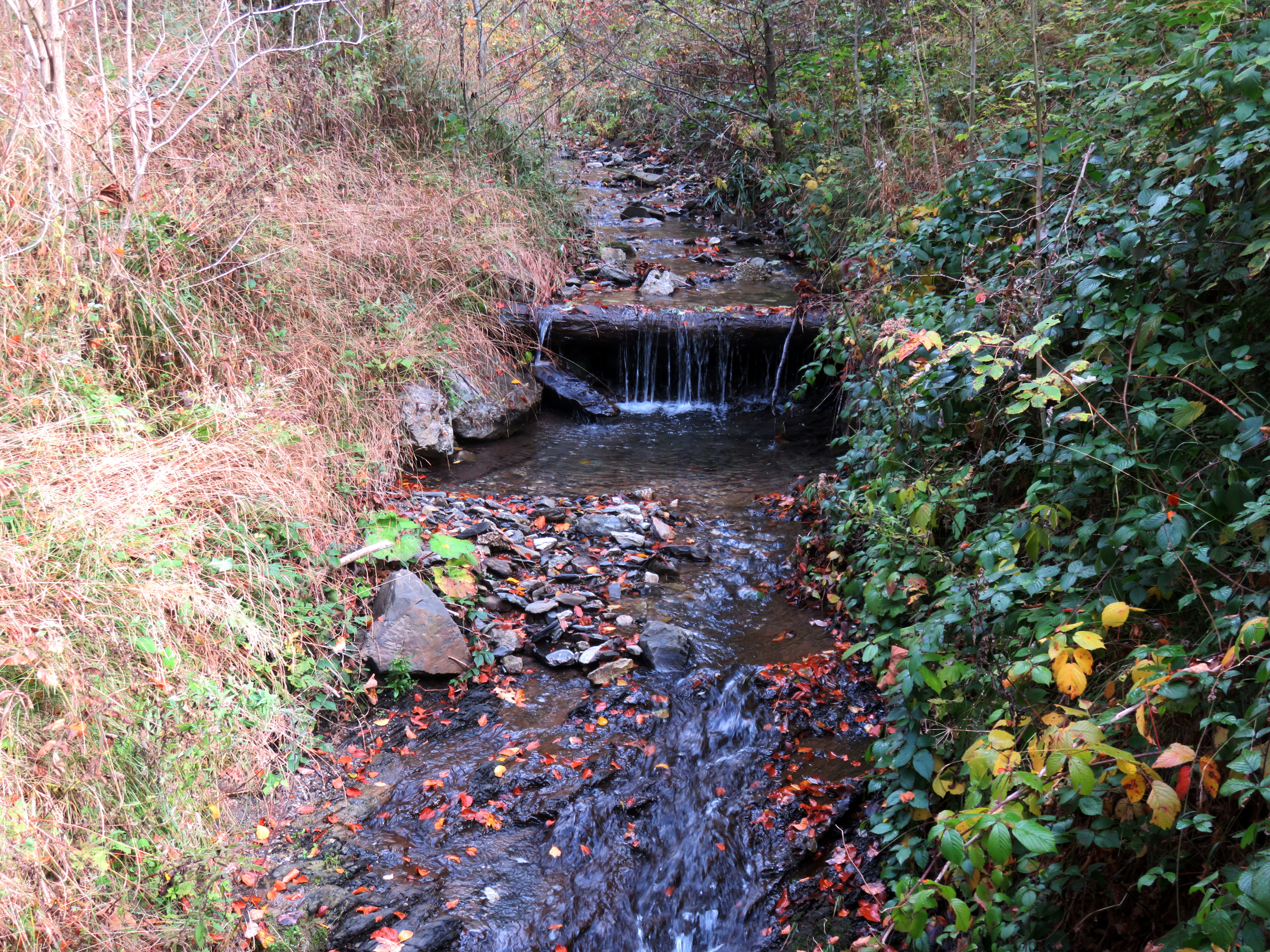
Mrovlje Creek (Slovene: Mrovljeva grapa) below Tičje Brdo

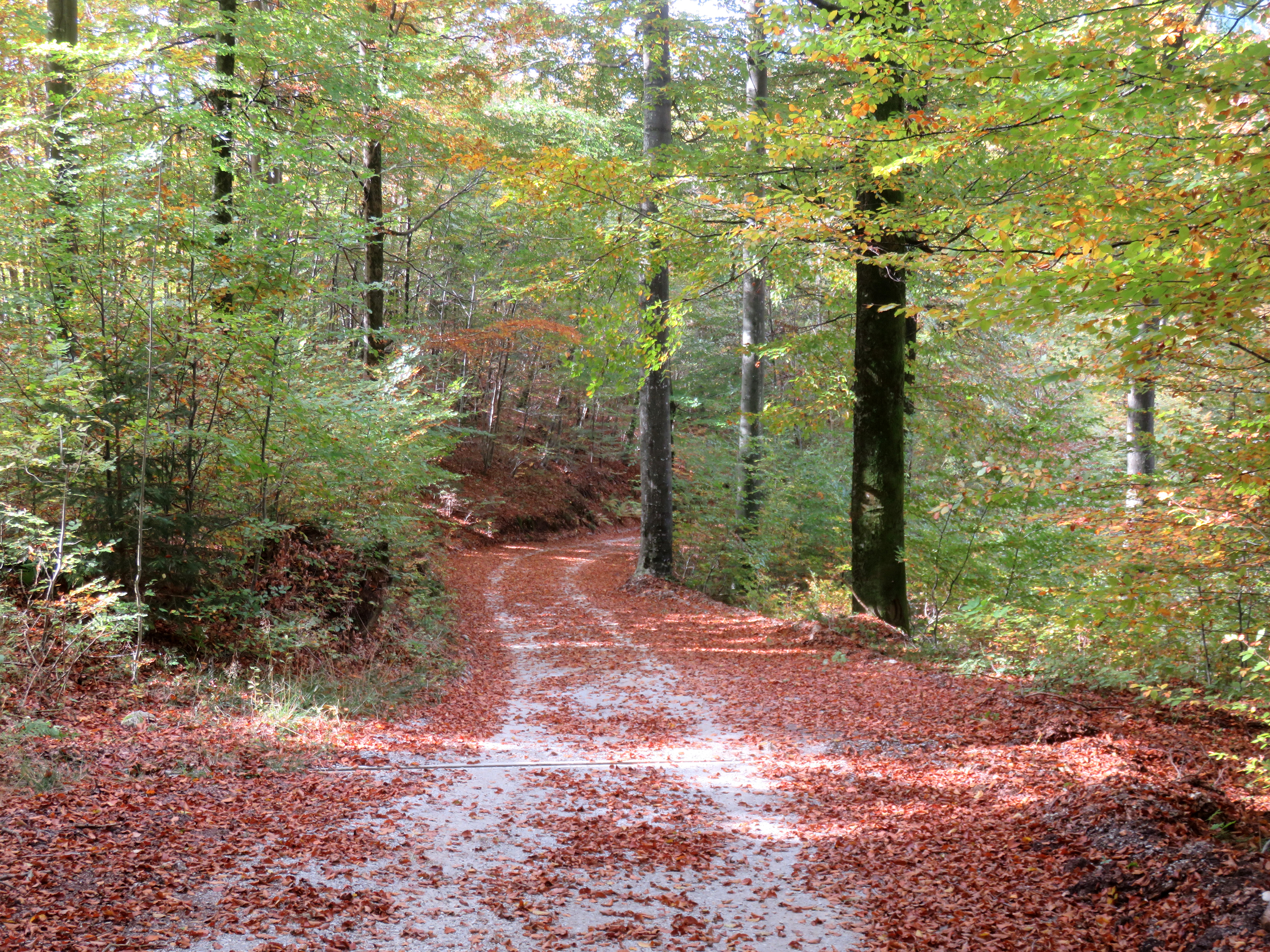
The road to Tičje Brdo

Tičje Brdo lies in the hills above the left bank of Mrovlje Creek (Slovene: Mrovljeva grapa), a tributary of Podplečica Creek, with access from a side road between Podpleče to the southwest and Kopačnica to the east. A hill also called Tičje brdo (elevation: 872 meters or 2,861 feet) rises northeast of the settlement.

== Name ==
Tičje Brdo was attested in historical sources as Tizhev Berdo c. 1780, Tizhim Werd in 1817, Tizhje Berdo in 1846, Tičje Berdo in 1874, and Tičjeberdo in 1884.

== History ==
Tičje Brdo was established as a settlement by 1630. Tičje Brdo was annexed by the village of Gorenji Novaki in 1953, ending its existence as an independent settlement.
