= Podvolovljek =

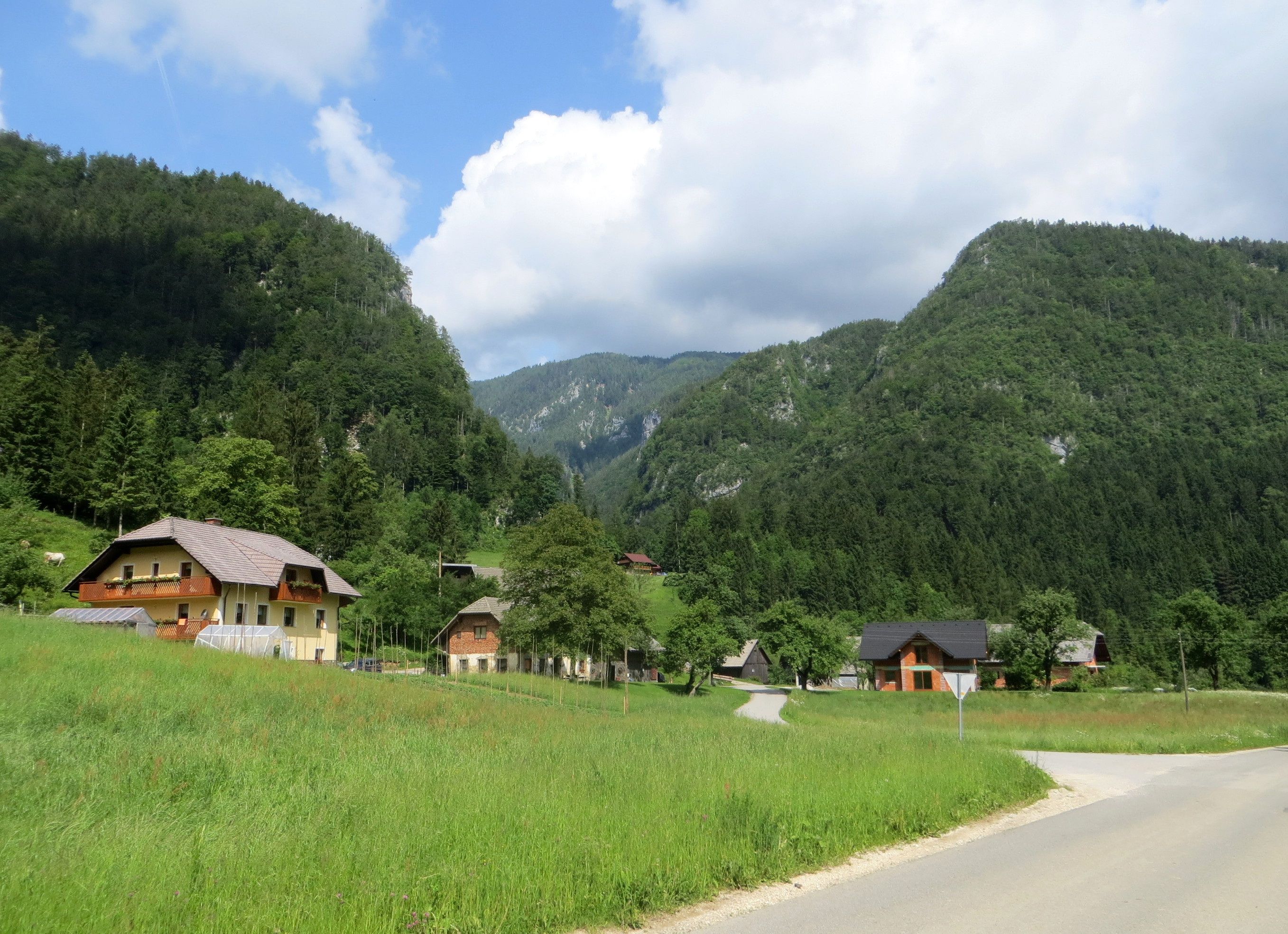

- Location in Slovenia
- Coordinates: 46°18′21.15″N 14°41′49.64″E
- Country: Slovenia
- Traditional region: Styria
- Statistical region: Savinja
- Municipality: Luče

Area
  - Total: 18.9 km^{2} (7.3 sq mi)
- Elevation: 646.7 m (2,122 ft)

Population (2019)
  - Total: 234

Podvolovljek (pronounced [pɔdʋɔˈloːu̯jɛk]) is a settlement in the Municipality of Luče in Slovenia. The area belongs to the traditional region of Styria and is now included in the Savinja Statistical Region.

== Name ==
The name Podvolovljek is a fused prepositional phrase that has lost case inflection, from pod 'below' + Volovljek. Volovljek is a mountain pass at 1,029 meters (3,376 ft) south of the settlement as well as the name of a creek that flows south from a spring east of the pass. The name Volovljek is derived from the common noun vol 'ox'. The pass was recorded as Ochsenperg (literally, 'ox mountain') in 1278.

== Church ==
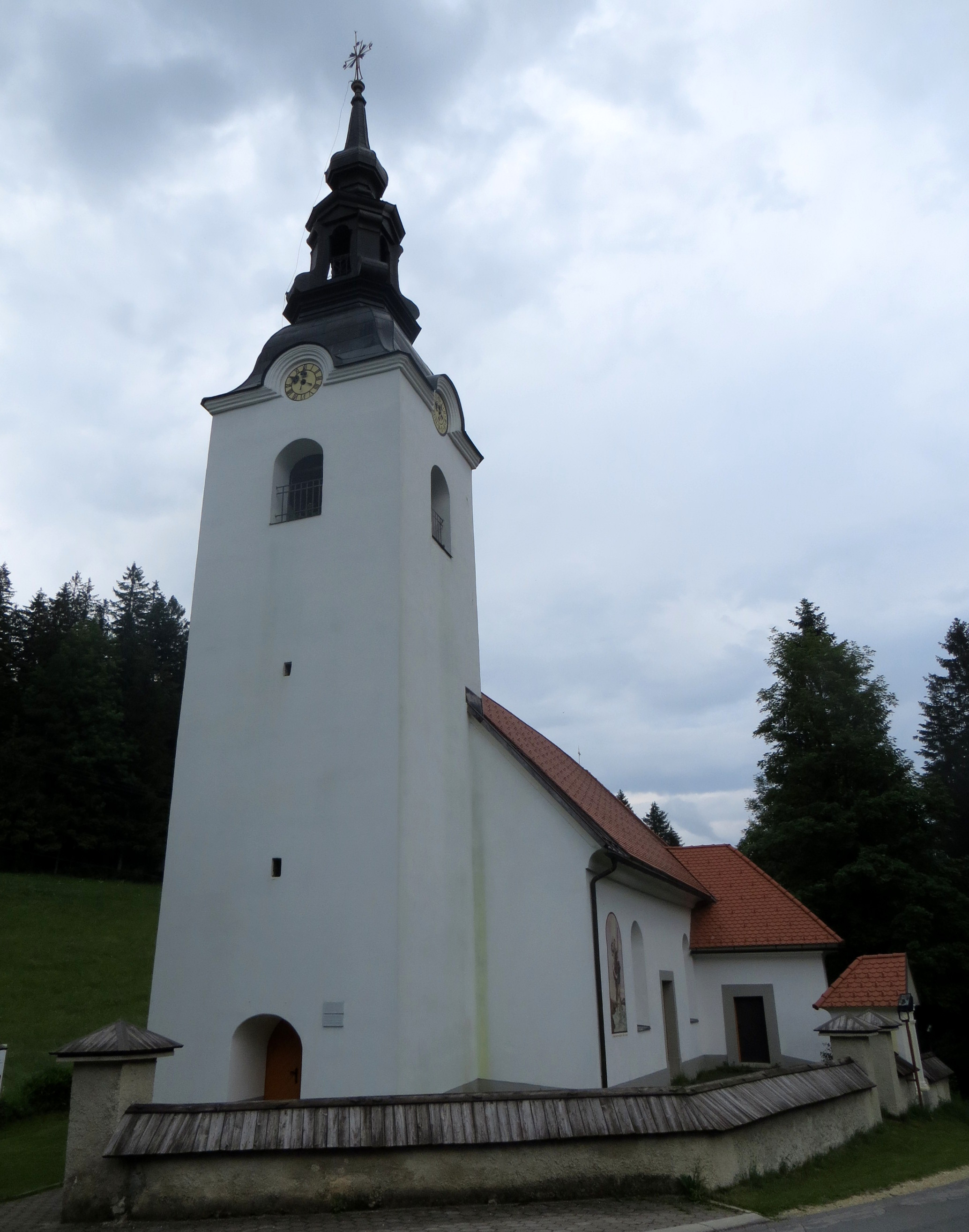
View from south

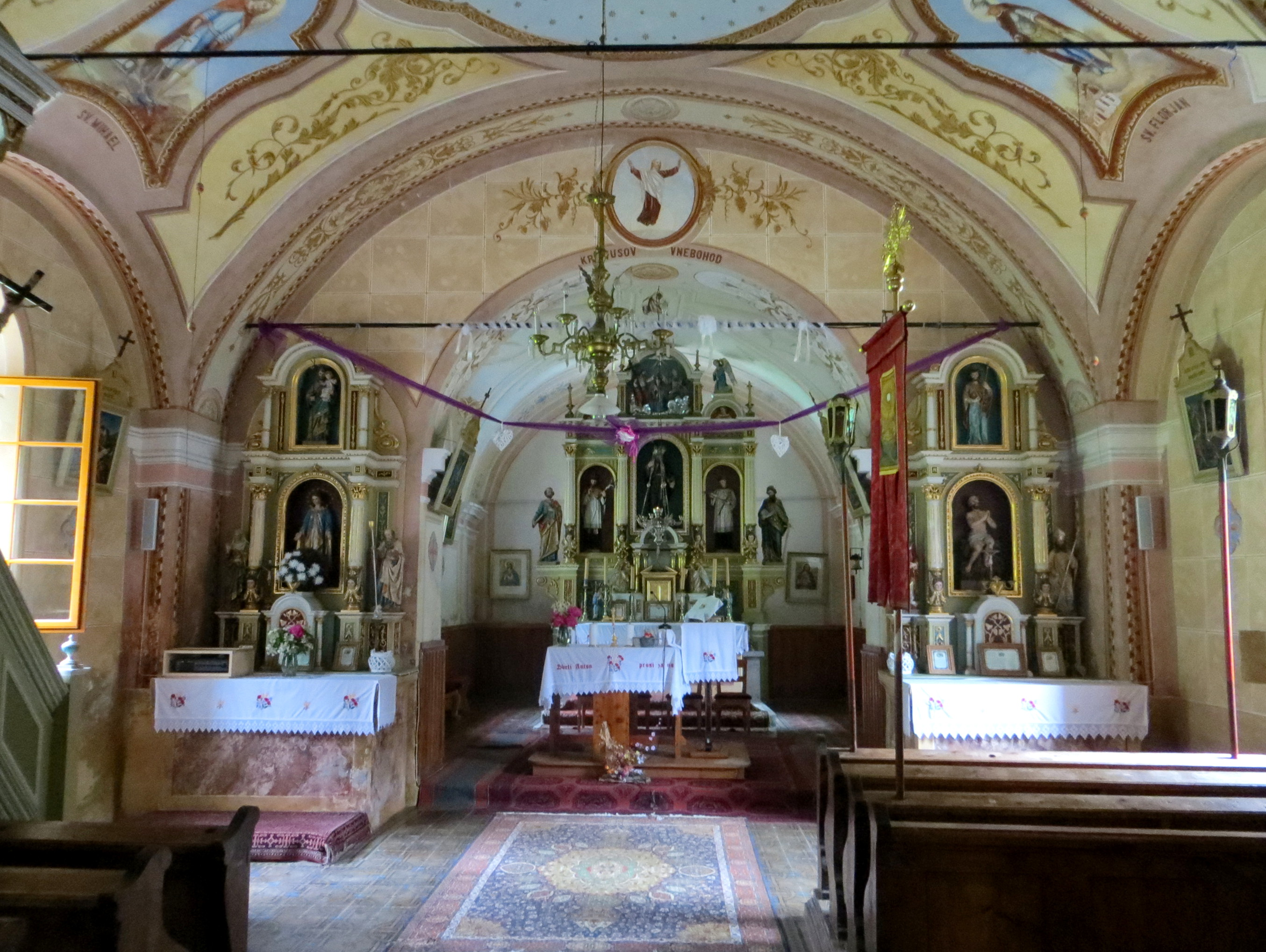
Interior

Saint Anthony the Hermit Church

The local church is dedicated to Saint Anthony the Hermit and belongs to the Parish of Luče. It was first mentioned in written documents dating to 1631.
