= Strmec, Luče =

Strmec
- Location in Slovenia
- Coordinates: 46°23′19.39″N 14°45′55.15″E
- Country: Slovenia
- Traditional region: Styria
- Statistical region: Savinja
- Municipality: Luče

Area
  - Total: 13.6 km^{2} (5.3 sq mi)
- Elevation: 925.4 m (3,036 ft)

Population (2019)
  - Total: 123

Strmec (pronounced [ˈstəɾməts]) is a dispersed settlement northeast of Luče in Slovenia. The area belongs to the traditional region of Styria and is now included in the Savinja Statistical Region.
