= Konjski Vrh =

- Location in Slovenia
- Coordinates: 46°23′14.67″N 14°47′7.72″E
- Country: Slovenia
- Traditional region: Styria
- Statistical region: Savinja
- Municipality: Luče

Area
  - Total: 12.27 km^{2} (4.74 sq mi)
- Elevation: 761.2 m (2,497 ft)

Population (2019)
  - Total: 128

Konjski Vrh (pronounced [ˈkoːnski ˈʋəɾx]) is a dispersed settlement in the Municipality of Luče in Slovenia. The area belongs to the traditional region of Styria and is now included in the Savinja Statistical Region.
