= Govejk =

Govejk Govejek (until 1980)
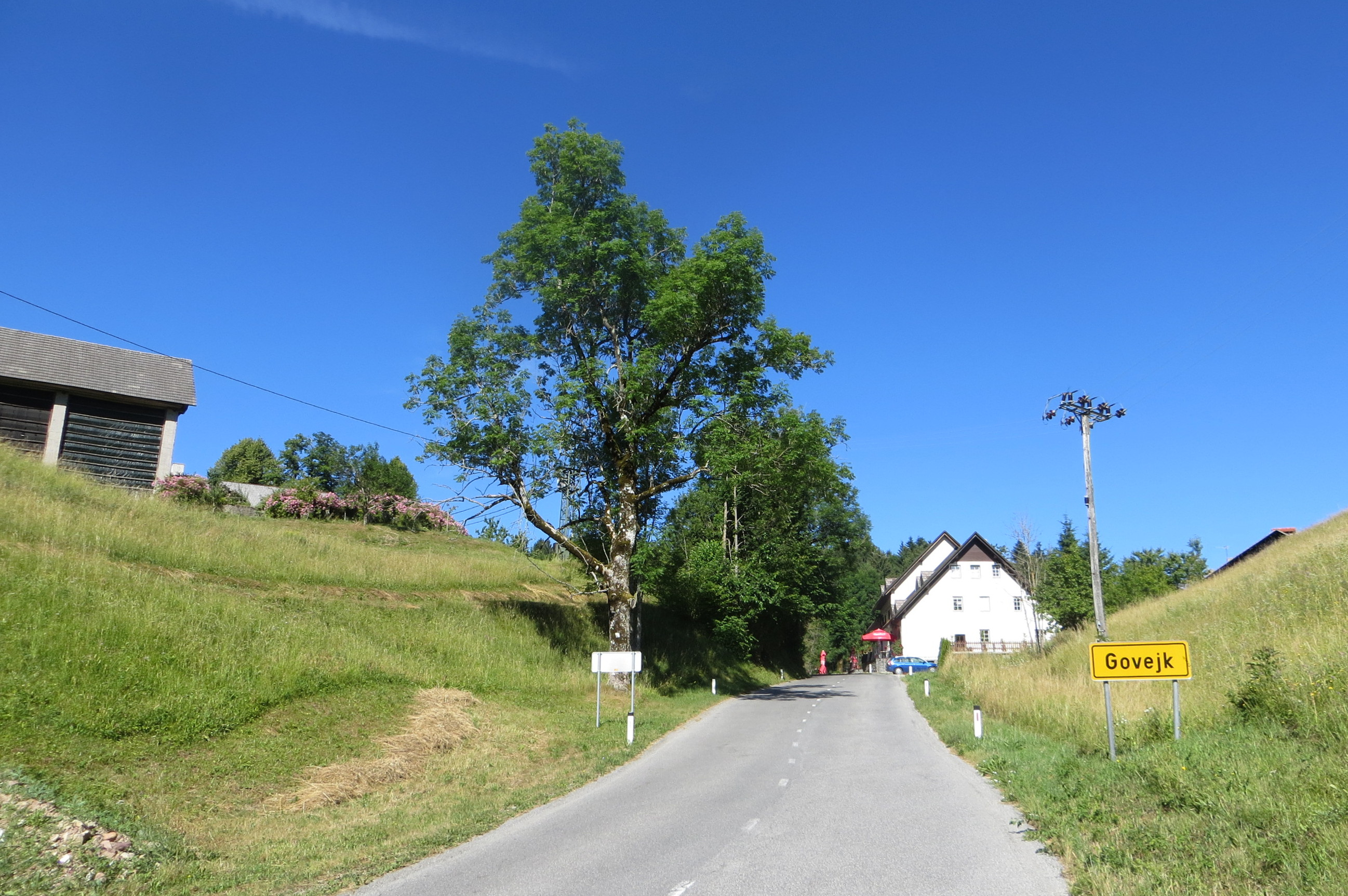

- Location in Slovenia
- Coordinates: 46°1′39.47″N 14°4′11.84″E
- Country: Slovenia
- Traditional region: Inner Carniola
- Statistical region: Gorizia
- Municipality: Idrija

Area
  - Total: 1.58 km^{2} (0.61 sq mi)
- Elevation: 747 m (2,451 ft)

Population (2002)
  - Total: 77

Govejk (pronounced [ɡɔˈʋeːi̯k], in older sources Govejek in Srnjak, German: Goweck und Sernak) is a small village in the Municipality of Idrija in the traditional Inner Carniola region of Slovenia. It lies on the road from Idrija to Žiri.

== Name ==
The name of the settlement was changed from Govejek to Govejk in 1980. The older name Govejek in Srnjak 'Govejk and Srnjak' referred to the hamlet of Srnjak, today part of the neighboring village of Ledinske Krnice.
