= Podveža =

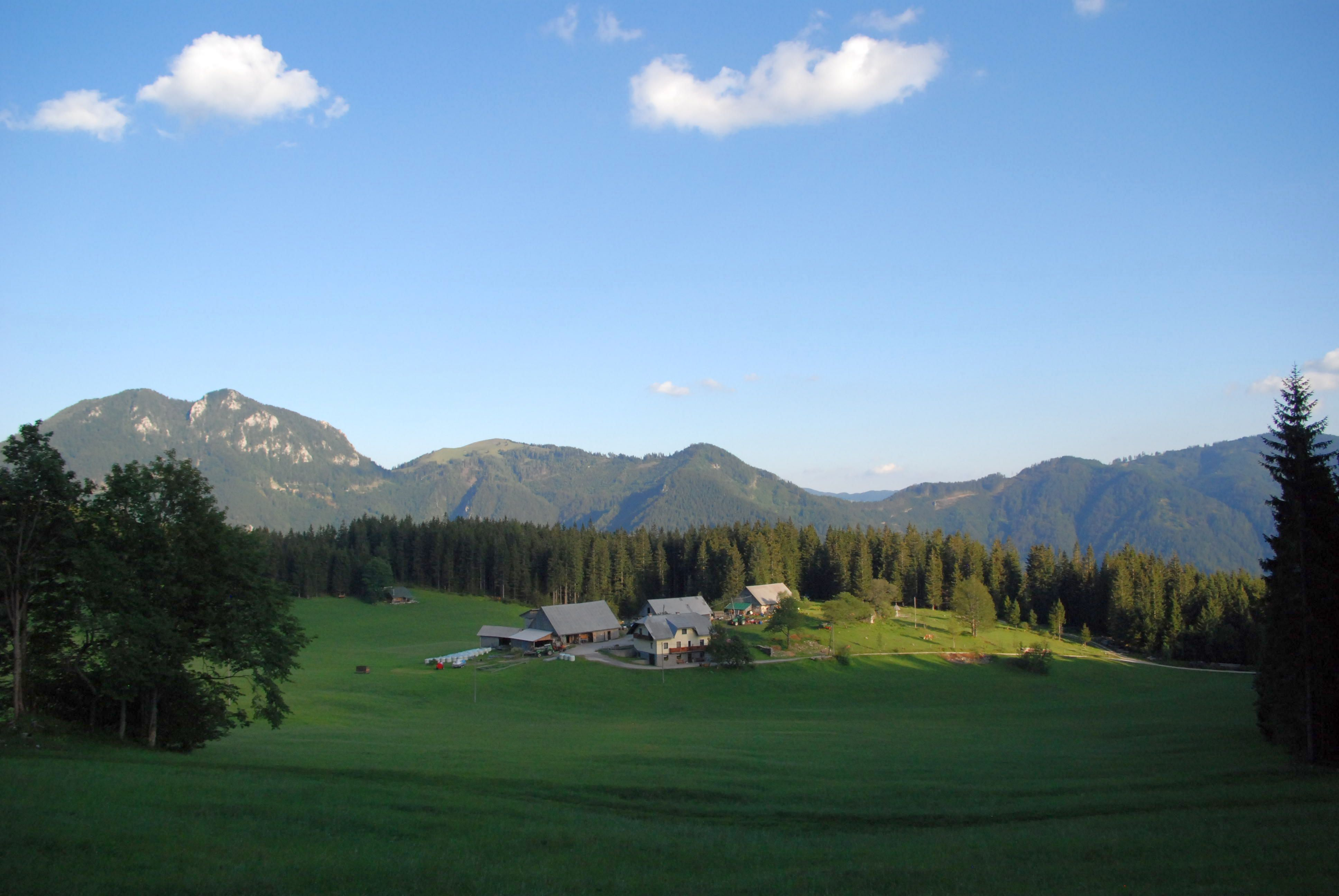
- The Planinšek Farm in Podveža is the highest-lying farm on the Dleskovec Plateau.

- Location in Slovenia
- Coordinates: 46°21′7.86″N 14°43′19.01″E
- Country: Slovenia
- Traditional region: Styria
- Statistical region: Savinja
- Municipality: Luče

Area
  - Total: 38.39 km^{2} (14.82 sq mi)
- Elevation: 825.2 m (2,707 ft)

Population (2012)
  - Total: 148
  - Density: 4/km^{2} (10/sq mi)

Podveža (pronounced [pɔˈdʋɛːʒa]) is a dispersed settlement of isolated farmsteads and highland pastures in the Municipality of Luče in Slovenia. The area belongs to the traditional region of Styria and is now included in the Savinja Statistical Region. It encompasses the Dleskovec Plateau.
