= Dleskovec Plateau =

Coordinates: 46°21′25.09″N 14°41′53.85″E

Molič Pasture on the northern edge of the Dleskovec Plateau. In the front, Kocbek Refuge. In the background, Sts. Cyril and Methodius Chapel.

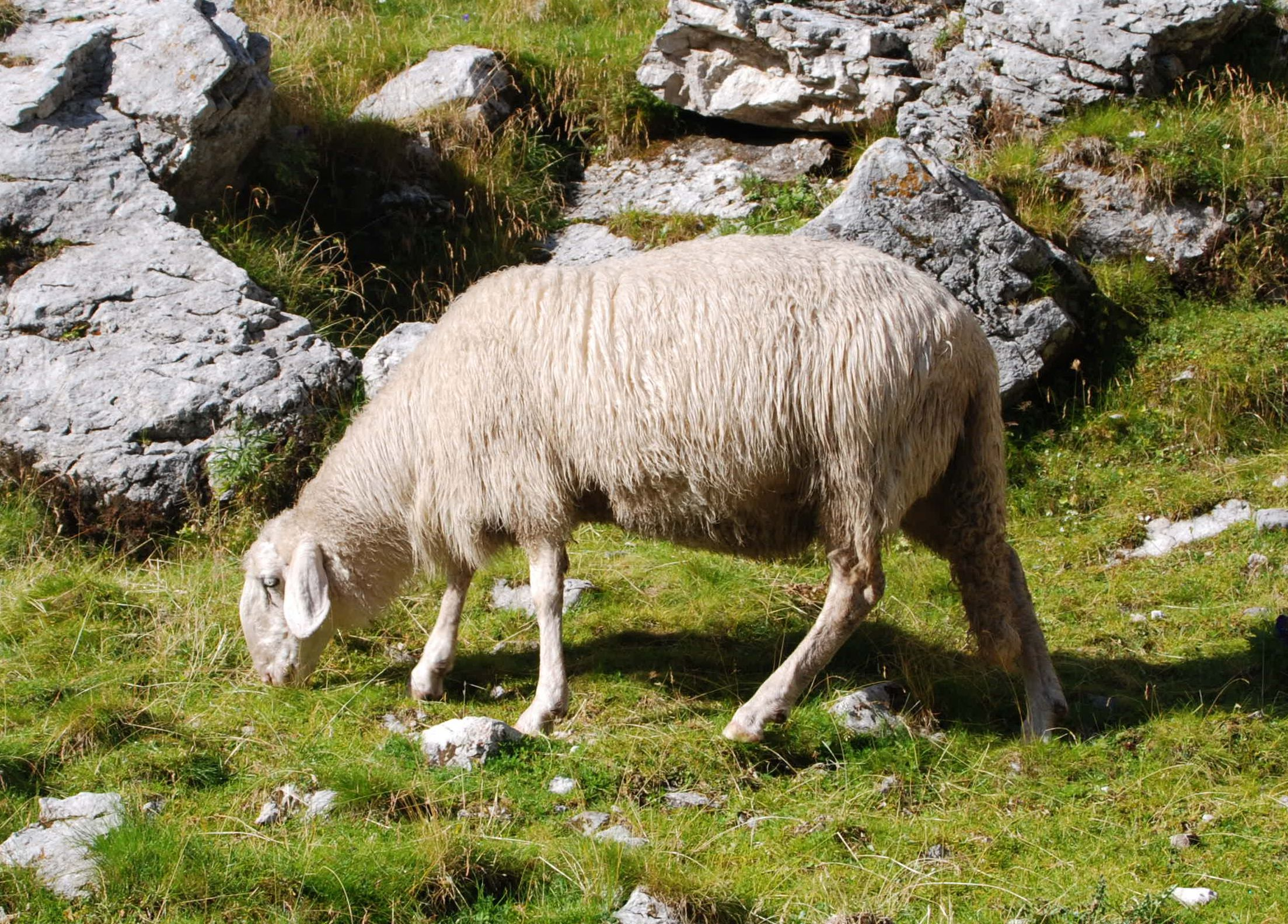
The Jezersko–Solčava sheep on the Dleskovec Plateau

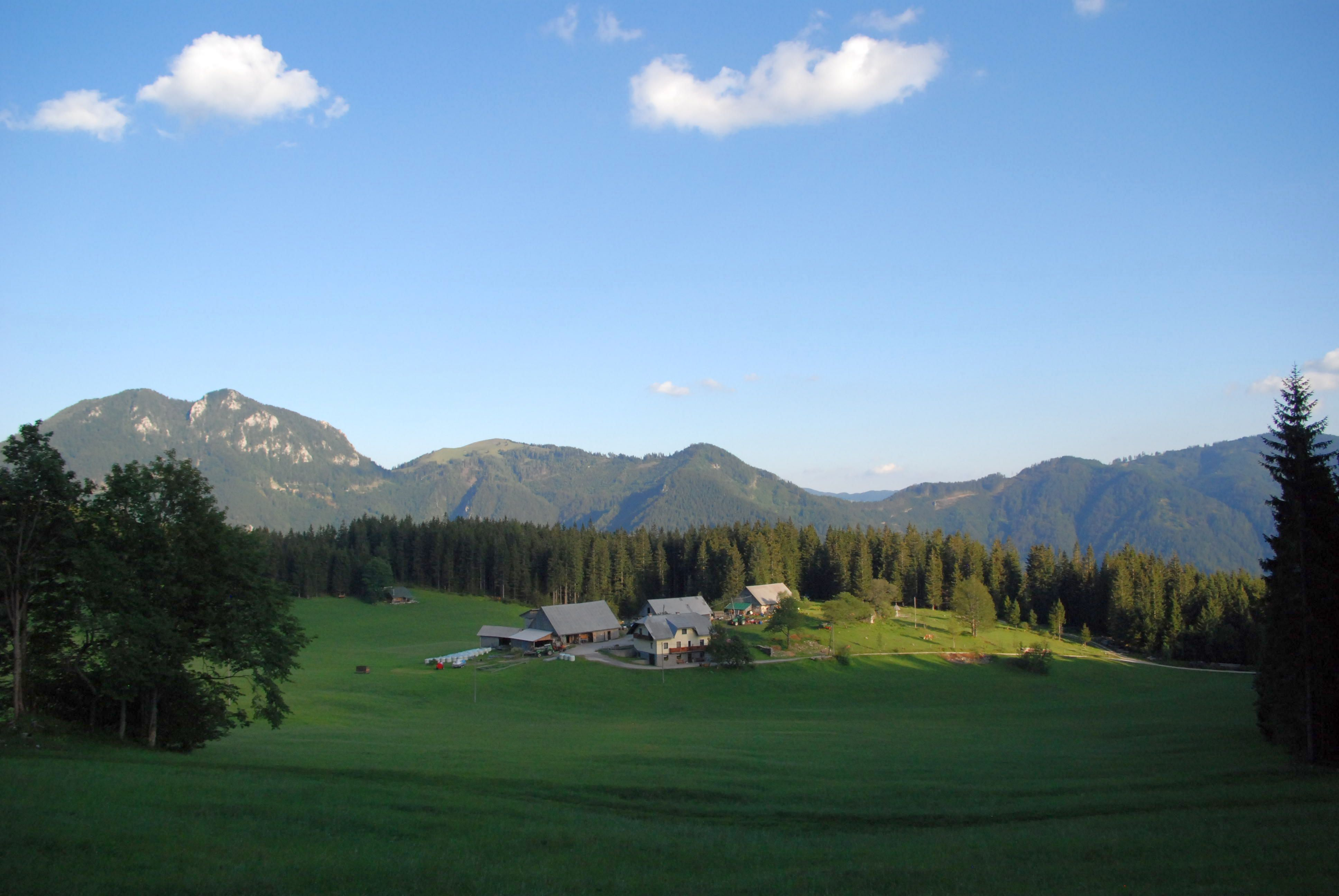
Planinšek Farm, the highest-elevation farm on the plateau. In the background to the left, Big Mount Rogatec (Veliki Rogatec; 1,557 m or 5,108 ft).

The Dleskovec Plateau (Slovene: Dleskovška planota), probably named after Mount Dleskovec (1,965 metres or 6,447 feet) in its central part, rarely also named the Vestibule (Veža), is a karstified mountain plateau in the eastern part of the Kamnik–Savinja Alps in northern Slovenia. It lies between the Roban Valley, the Upper Savinja Valley, and the Lučka Bela Valley, to the southeast of Mount Ojstrica and to the northeast of the Big Pasture Plateau. It is oriented in the direction from the southeast to the northwest. It covers an area of about 25 square kilometres (9.7 sq mi) and is partly overgrown by forest and Mountain Pine. The highest point of the plateau is Mount Big Peak (Veliki vrh; 2,110 m or 6,920 ft), also located in its central part. Administratively, the Dleskovec Plateau belongs to the settlement of Podveža in the Municipality of Luče.

There are several mountain pastures on the plateau. On the southern side, there are Podvežak Pasture (1,500 m or 4,900 ft) with a hut, Ravne Pasture, and Vodole Pasture. There is also Planinšek Farm or Planica, which is the highest-elevation farm on the plateau. On the northern side, the largest is Molič Pasture (1,754 m or 5,755 ft) with Kocbek Refuge. Above the latter stands a chapel dedicated to Sts. Cyril and Methodius (1,829 m or 6,001 ft). Vodotočnik Pasture is situated in the western part. On this pasture, there are a small heart-shaped pond and a shepherd hut. The pond is a bit over 50 m (160 ft) long and about 2 m (6 ft 7 in) deep. Below Vodotočnik Pasture, there is a scree slope. On the slope north of it, there are some hummocky meadows.

The relief, formed of Triassic carbonate rocks, is intersected with grooves, grykes, sinkholes, and shafts, the deepest of which has a depth of over 1,000 m (3,300 ft). It has been significantly altered by glaciers in the Pleistocene and by snow. There are almost no streams on the plateau. The climate is Alpine, with the average yearly temperature about 0 °C, the average winter temperature about −7 °C, and the average summer temperature about 7.5 °C. The plateau is mostly overgrown by deciduous forest, with predominance of beech (Fagus sylvatica), larch (Larix decidua), and spruce (Picea abies). A forest reserve with an area of 342 ha (850 acres) is situated at the extreme northwest of the plateau.
