= Ledinske Krnice =

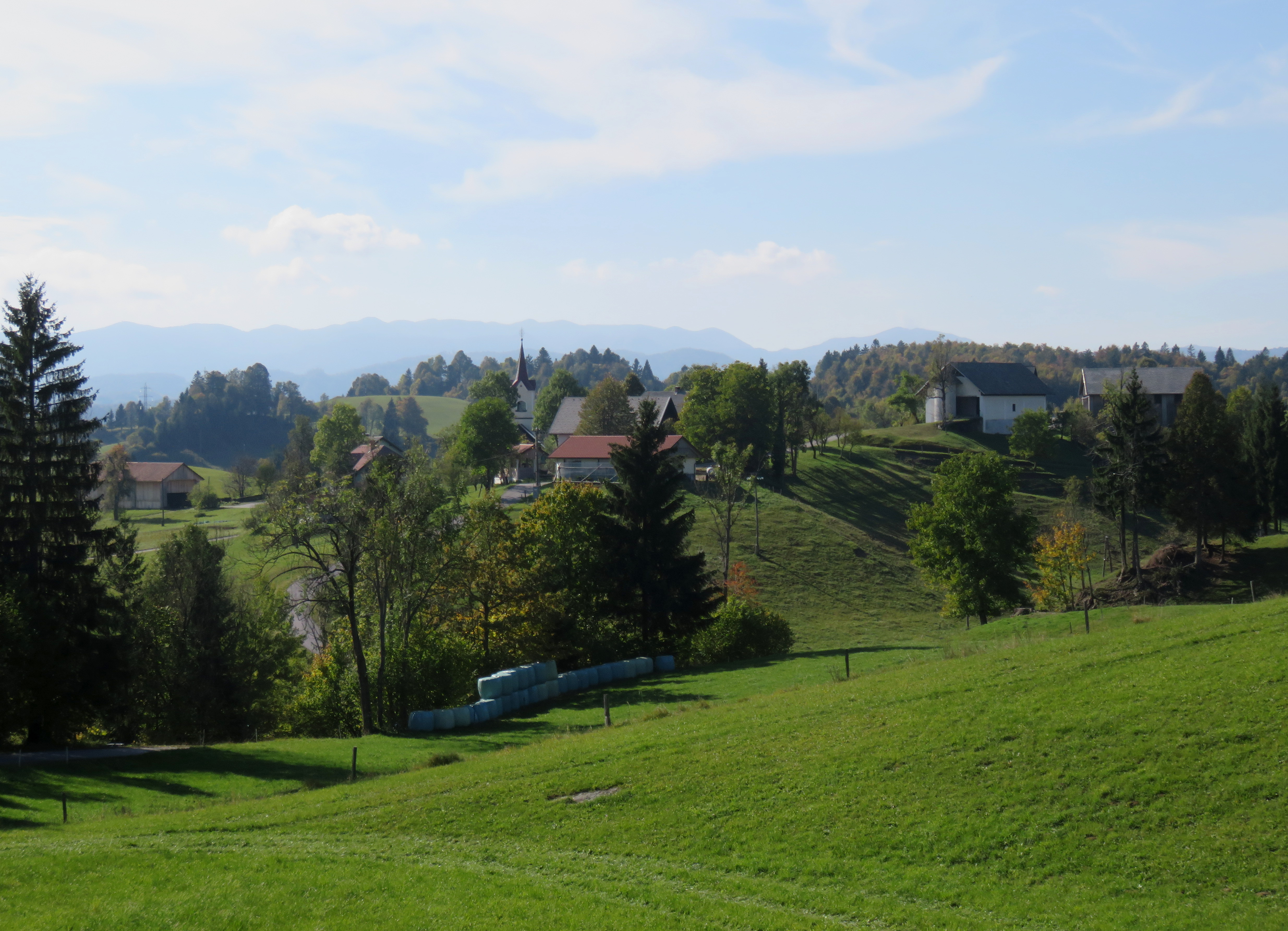

- Location in Slovenia
- Coordinates: 46°2′23.99″N 14°3′50.17″E
- Country: Slovenia
- Traditional region: Inner Carniola
- Statistical region: Gorizia
- Municipality: Idrija

Area
  - Total: 2.53 km^{2} (0.98 sq mi)
- Elevation: 785.9 m (2,578 ft)

Population (2002)
  - Total: 52

Ledinske Krnice (pronounced [lɛˈdiːnskɛ kəɾˈniːtsɛ], in older sources Žirovske Krnice, German: Karnitze) is a settlement in the hills east of Spodnja Idrija in the Municipality of Idrija in the traditional Inner Carniola region of Slovenia.

== Geography ==
The village includes the hamlet of Srnjak, which was formerly paired with neighboring Govejk in a single settlement known as Govejek in Srnjak (German: Goweck und Sernak).

== Name ==
The name of the settlement was changed from Krnice to Ledinske Krnice in 1952. The name literally means 'Krnice near Ledine', distinguishing the village from Idrijske Krnice (i.e., 'Krnice near Idrija') 7 kilometers (4.3 mi) to the west. The plural place name Krnice (and the corresponding singular Krnica) is found several times in Slovenia and is derived from the common noun krnica 'cirque, bowl', referring to the local geography.

== Church ==
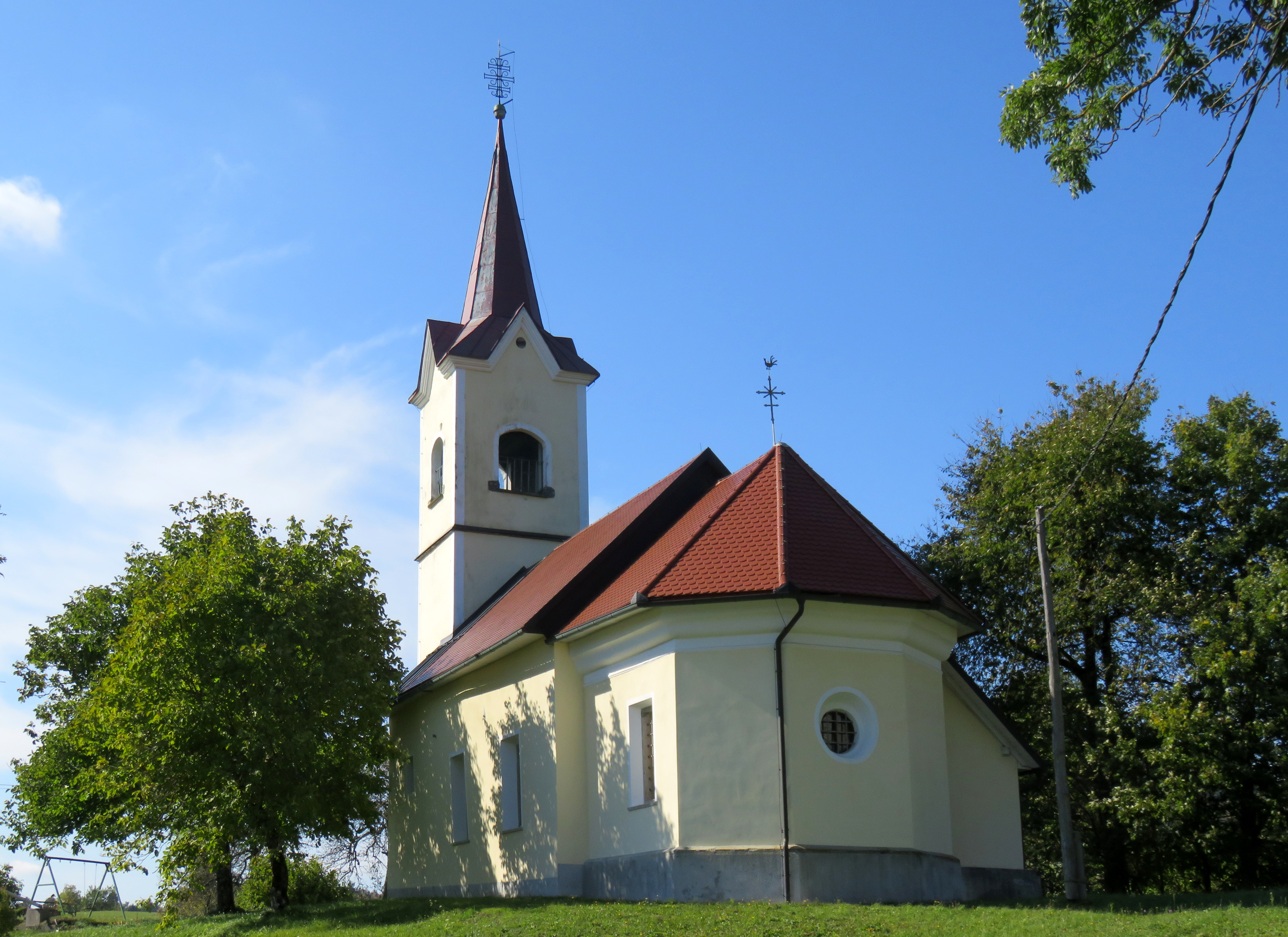
Saint Acacius's Church

The local church is dedicated to Saint Acacius and belongs to the Parish of Ledine.
