= Oslica =

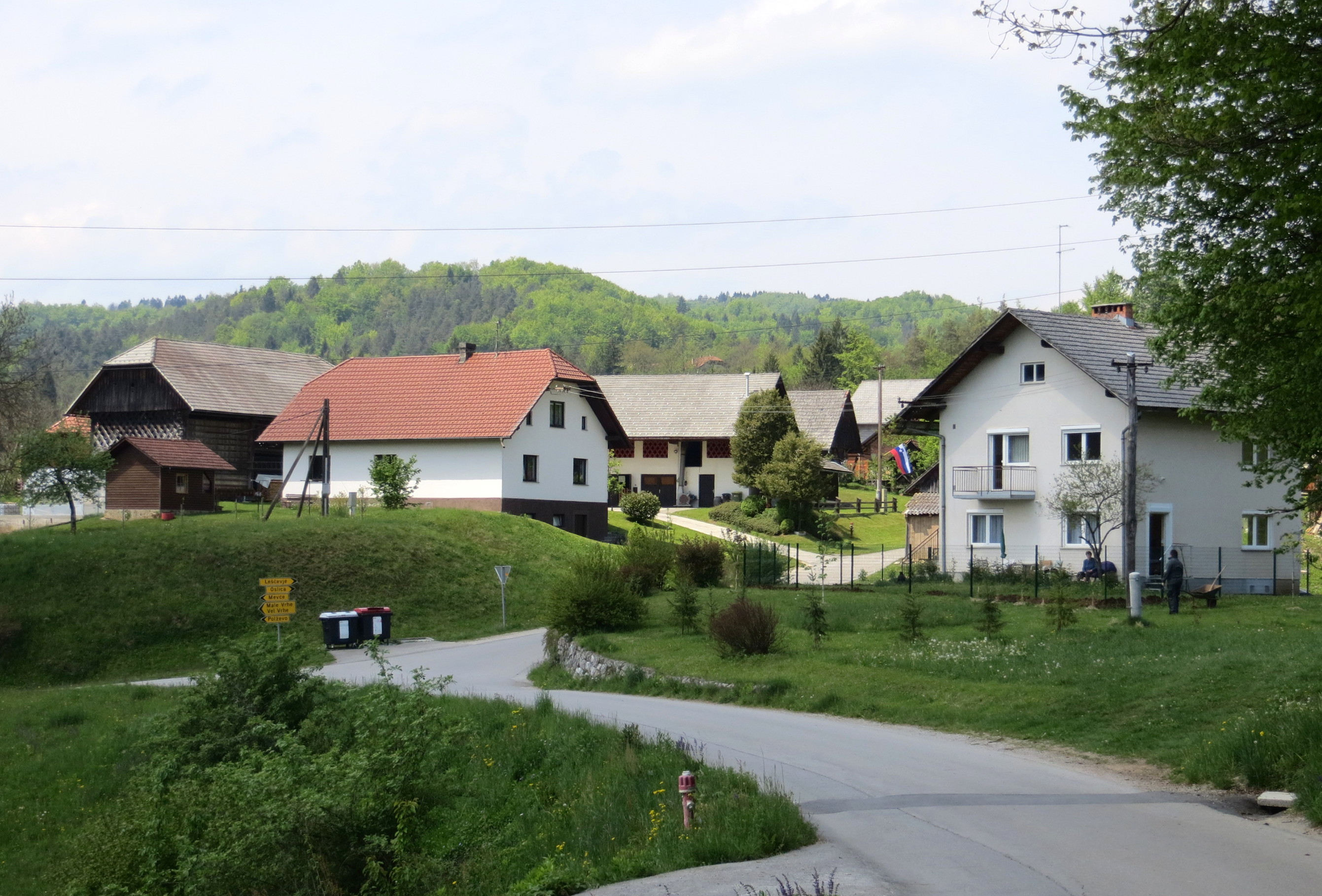

- Location in Slovenia
- Coordinates: 45°54′30.21″N 14°47′26.86″E
- Country: Slovenia
- Traditional region: Lower Carniola
- Statistical region: Central Slovenia
- Municipality: Ivančna Gorica

Area
  - Total: 0.74 km^{2} (0.29 sq mi)
- Elevation: 327.9 m (1,076 ft)

Population (2002)
  - Total: 49

Oslica (pronounced [ˈoːslitsa]; German: Osselze) is a small settlement just northwest of Muljava in the Municipality of Ivančna Gorica in central Slovenia. The area is part of the historical region of Lower Carniola and is included in the Central Slovenia Statistical Region.

== Name ==
Oslica was attested in written sources as Ozlitz in 1291 and as Osslizi in 1584. The origin of the name Oslica is uncertain, but is likely derived from the common noun osel 'donkey' (or from the surname Osel derived from that noun). A less likely possibility, argued against by medieval attestations, is that the name is derived from the plant name oselica 'pepper-saxifrage'. The toponym Oselica has the same etymology.
