= Stara Oselica =

Rural settlement in Upper Carniola, Slovenia

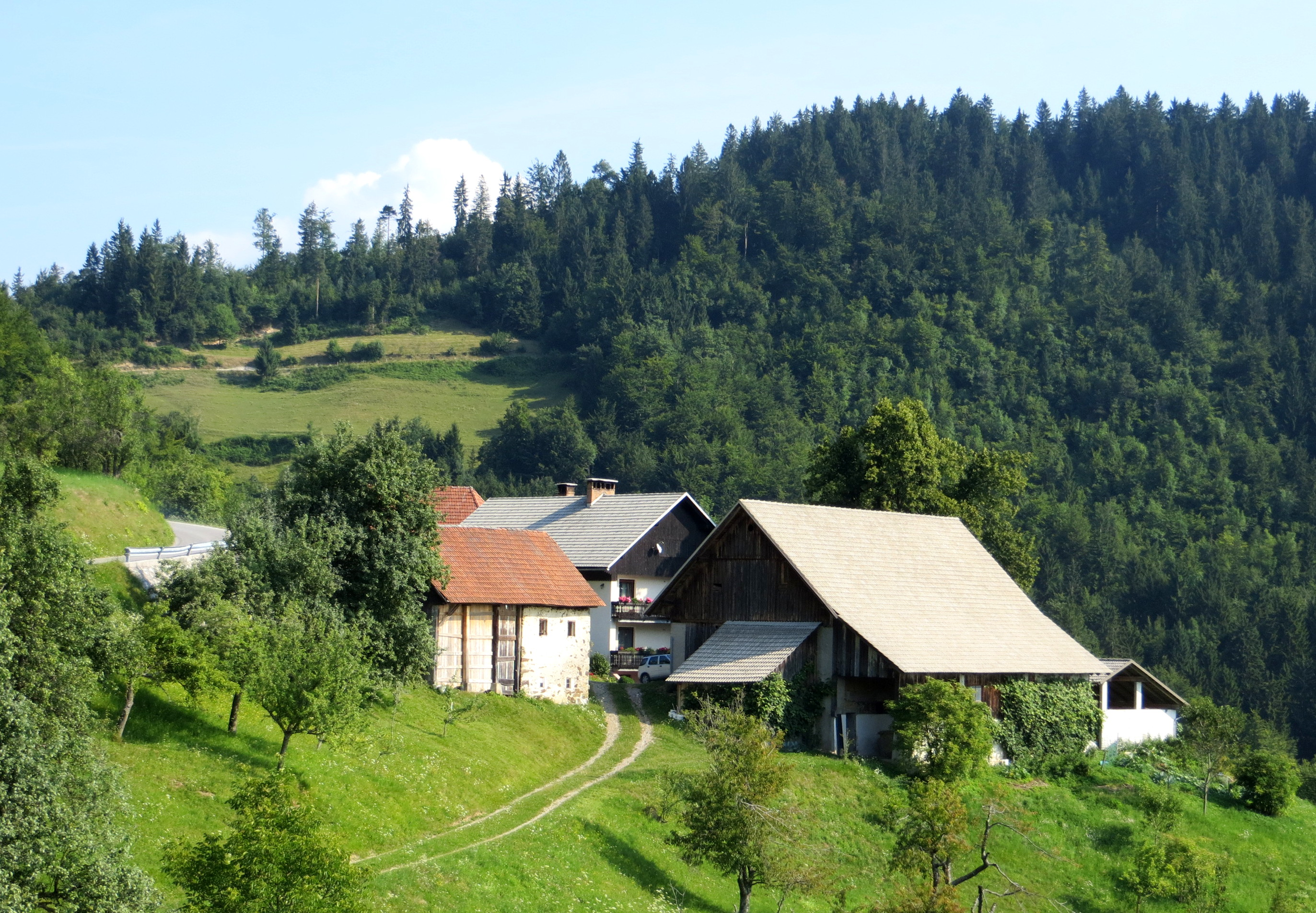

- Location in Slovenia
- Coordinates: 46°6′21.13″N 14°4′34.13″E
- Country: Slovenia
- Traditional region: Upper Carniola
- Statistical region: Upper Carniola
- Municipality: Gorenja Vas–Poljane

Area
  - Total: 11.57 km^{2} (4.47 sq mi)
- Elevation: 799.5 m (2,623 ft)

Population (2020)
  - Total: 213
  - Density: 18.4/km^{2} (47.7/sq mi)

Stara Oselica (pronounced [ˈstaːɾa ˈoːsɛlitsa]; German: Altoßlitz) is a dispersed settlement in the Municipality of Gorenja Vas–Poljane in the Upper Carniola region of Slovenia.

== Name ==
The name Stara Oselica literally means 'old Oselica' (in contrast to nearby Nova Oselica 'new Oselica'). The origin of the name Oselica is uncertain, but is likely derived from the common noun osel 'donkey' (or from the surname Osel derived from that noun). A less likely possibility, argued against by medieval attestations, is that the name is derived from the plant name oselica 'pepper-saxifrage'. The toponym Oslica has the same etymology.

== Church ==
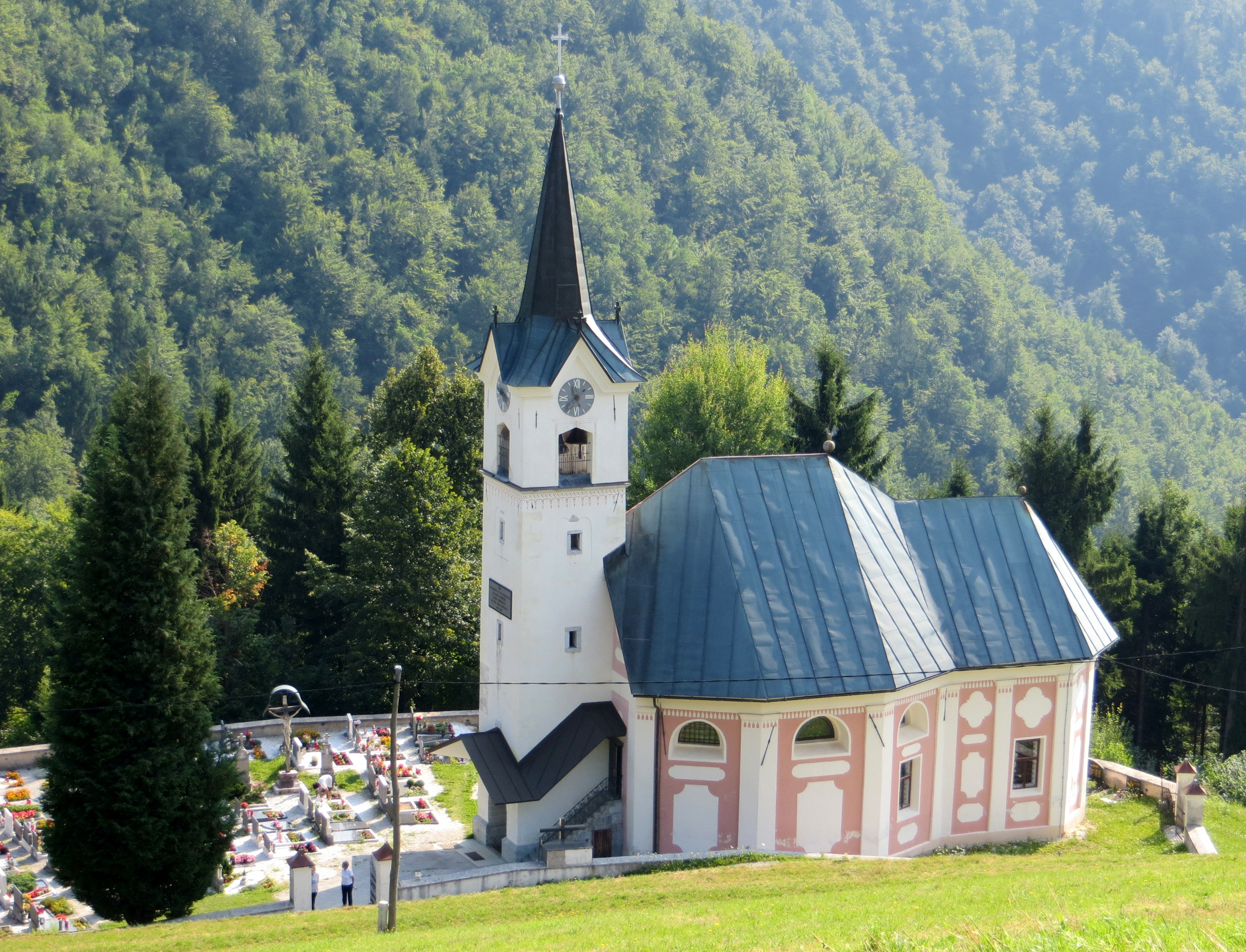
View from the west

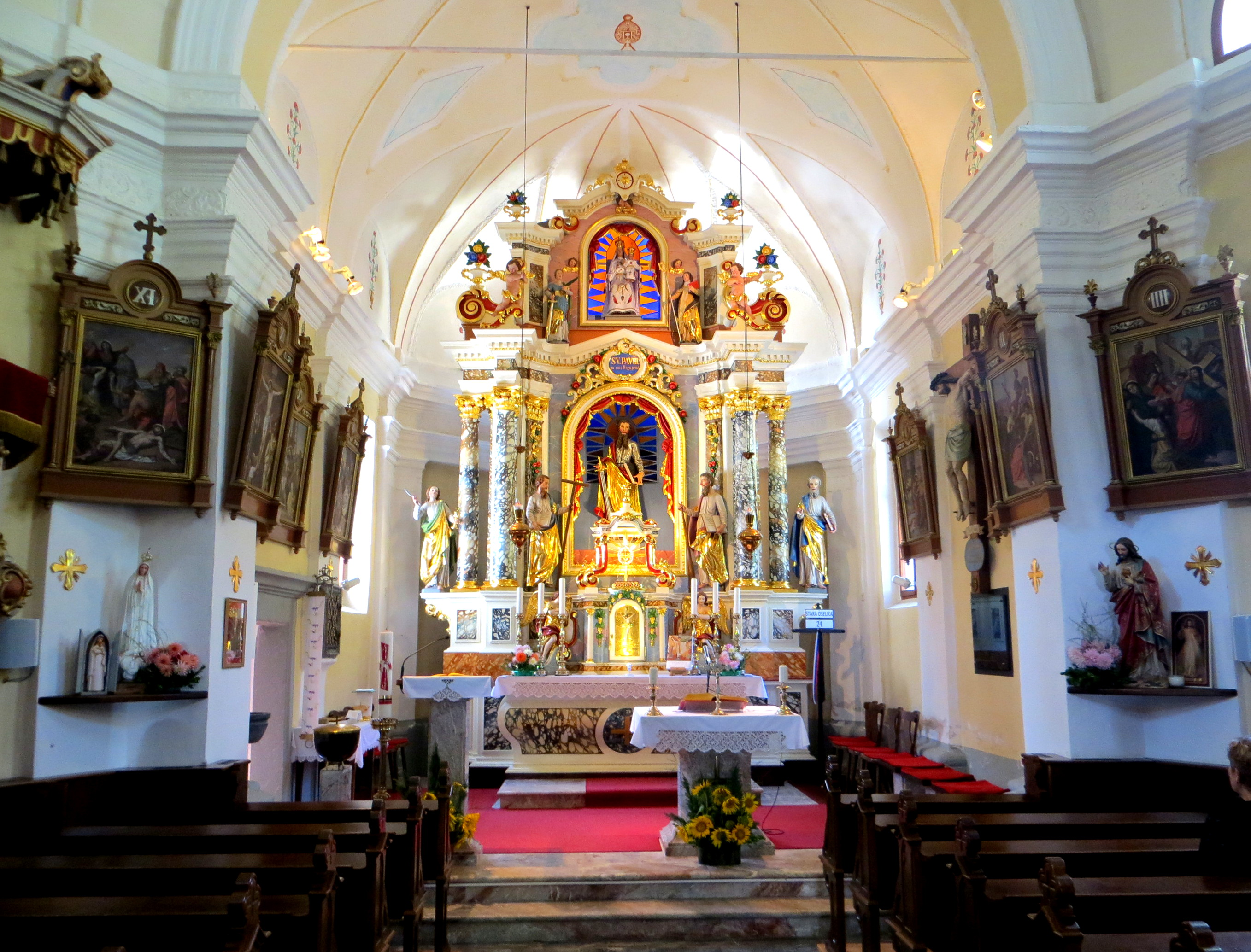
Church interior

Conversion of Paul Church

The local church is dedicated to the Conversion of Saint Paul. It is a Baroque building from the late 17th or early 18th century. Its belfry is older and was made taller at the time the current church was built. The main altar dates to the first half of the 18th century.
