= Idrijske Krnice =

Idrijske Krnice Krnice (until 1952), Idrske Krnice (1952–1980)
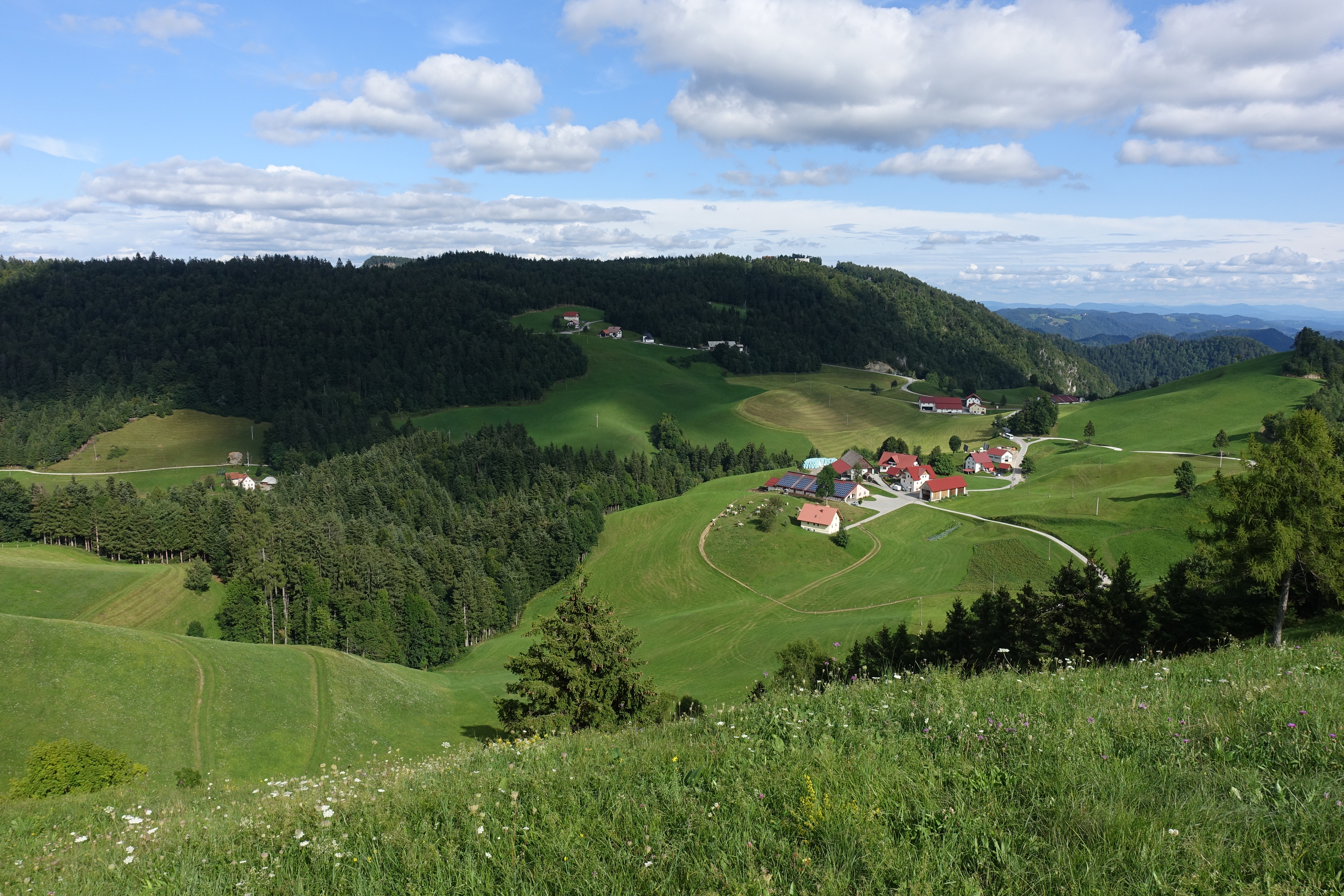
- View of Idrijske Krnice facing east

- Location in Slovenia
- Coordinates: 46°3′3.48″N 13°58′43.85″E
- Country: Slovenia
- Traditional region: Inner Carniola
- Statistical region: Gorizia
- Municipality: Idrija

Area
  - Total: 12.35 km^{2} (4.77 sq mi)
- Elevation: 959.9 m (3,149 ft)

Population (2002)
  - Total: 141

Idrijske Krnice (pronounced [ˈiːdɾii̯ske kəɾˈniːtsɛ]; German: Karnitze) is a dispersed settlement in the hills northwest of Spodnja Idrija in the Municipality of Idrija in the traditional Inner Carniola region of Slovenia.

== Name ==
The name of the settlement was changed from Krnice to Idrske Krnice in 1952. It was changed again from Idrske Krnice to Idrijske Krnice in 1980. The name literally means 'Krnice near Idrija', distinguishing the village from Ledinske Krnice (i.e., 'Krnice near Ledine') 7 kilometers (4.3 mi) to the east. The plural place name Krnice (and the corresponding singular Krnica) is found several times in Slovenia and is derived from the common noun krnica 'cirque, bowl', referring to the local geography.
