= Kopačnica =

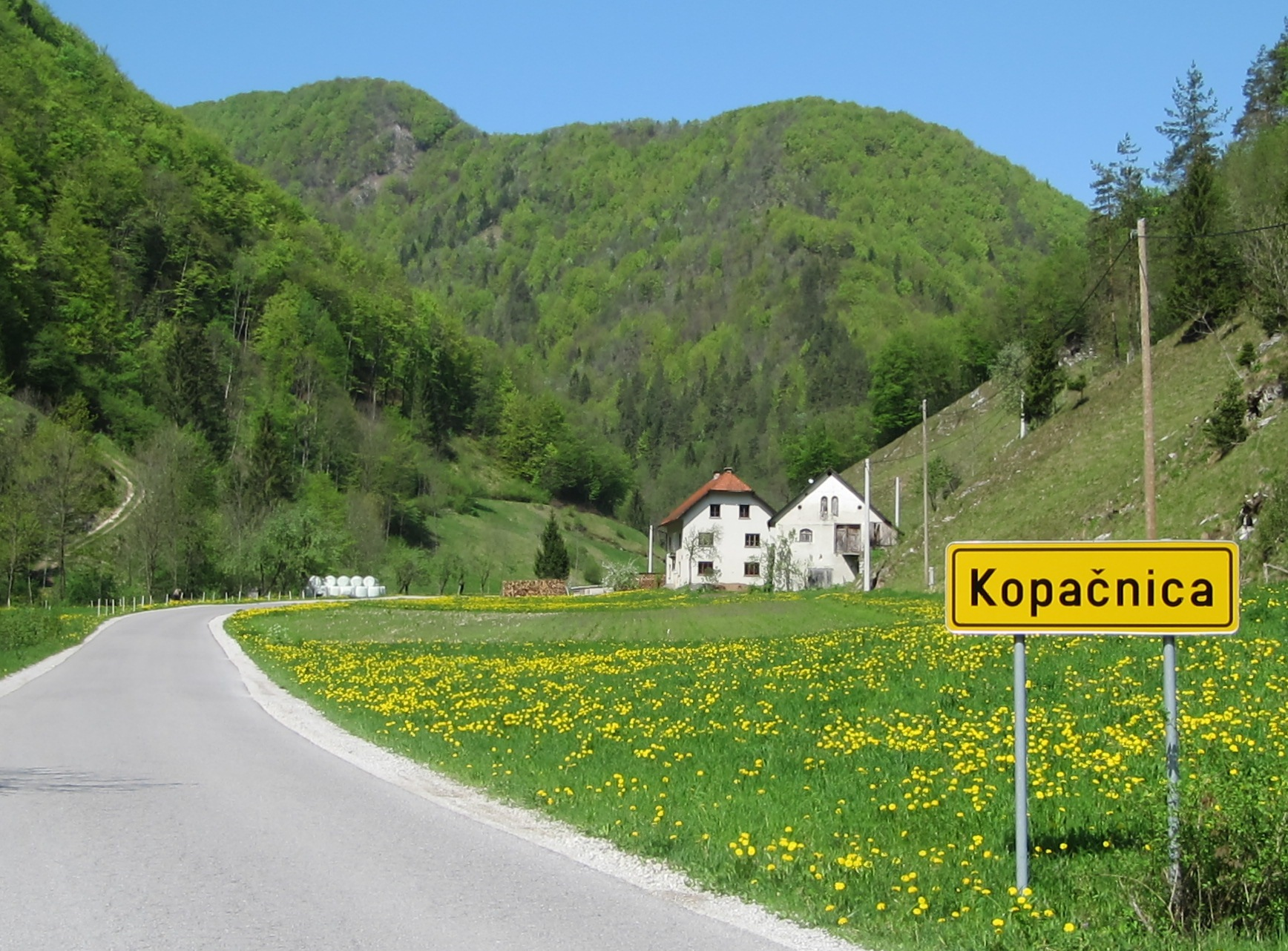
- Kopačnica

- Location in Slovenia
- Coordinates: 46°7′56.36″N 14°4′33.94″E
- Country: Slovenia
- Traditional region: Upper Carniola
- Statistical region: Upper Carniola
- Municipality: Gorenja Vas–Poljane

Area
  - Total: 5.26 km^{2} (2.03 sq mi)
- Elevation: 525.5 m (1,724 ft)

Population (2020)
  - Total: 68
  - Density: 13/km^{2} (33/sq mi)

Kopačnica (pronounced [kɔˈpaːtʃnitsa], German: Kapatschnitz) is a dispersed settlement in a small valley northwest of Gorenja Vas in the Municipality of Gorenja Vas–Poljane in the Upper Carniola region of Slovenia.

== Geography ==
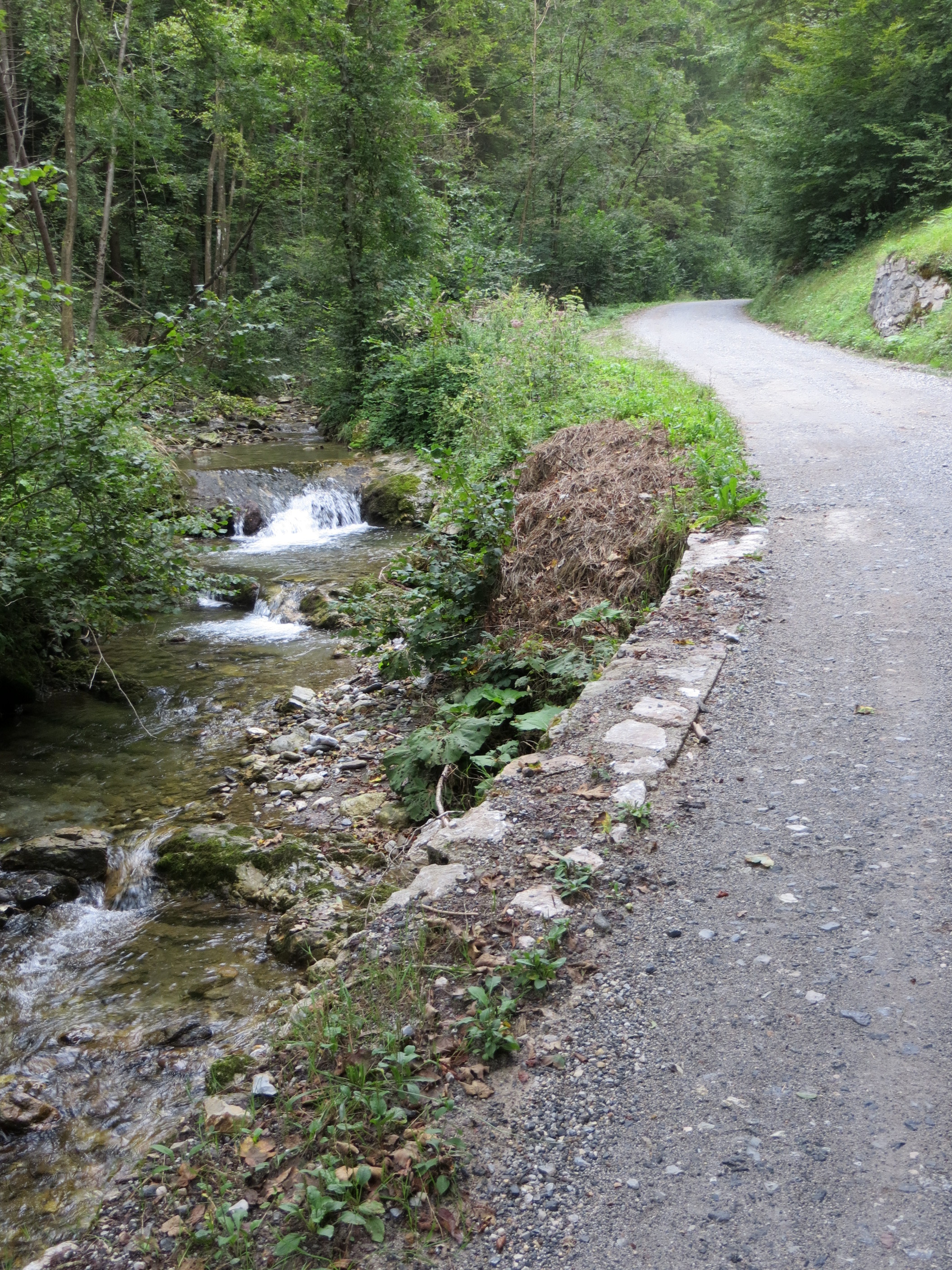
The Podplečica Valley

Kopačnica consists of scattered farms along the valley of Kopačnica Creek and its tributaries: Podplečica Creek to the northwest, which flows through a canyon in the hamlet of Jezbirc, as well as Podkovščica Creek and Pohovica Creek in the Komajs Gorge (Slovene: Komajska grapa) to the west, below Stara Oselica. The road to Cerkno passes through the Podplečica Valley, and a road to Leskovica through the Kopačnica Valley to the northeast. Surrounding elevations include Makovc Hill (920 meters or 3,020 feet) to the east, Mah Hill (856 meters or 2,808 feet) to the north, Mount Ermanovec (1,026 meters or 3,366 feet) to the south, and Vrhovec Hill (Slovene: Vrhovčev grič; 1,048 meters or 3,438 feet) to the southwest. The village has hayfields and forested land, and some tilled fields in the lower area where the valleys join.

== Name ==
The name Kopačnica is believed to derive from the verb kopati 'to dig' and may be related to the noun kopačina 'field cultivated by digging'. In the past the village was known as Kapatschnitz in German.

== History ==
The Rapallo border between Yugoslavia and Italy passed through the area and the remnants of border guard posts are found nearby. During the Second World War, the Partisans maintained a checkpoint at house number 10 in the village.
