= Krnica, Luče =

Krnica
- Location in Slovenia
- Coordinates: 46°20′53.32″N 14°46′2.79″E
- Country: Slovenia
- Traditional region: Styria
- Statistical region: Savinja
- Municipality: Luče

Area
  - Total: 15.81 km^{2} (6.10 sq mi)
- Elevation: 754.5 m (2,475 ft)

Population (2019)
  - Total: 237

Krnica (pronounced [kəɾˈniːtsa]) is a dispersed settlement of isolated farmsteads in the Municipality of Luče in Slovenia. The area belongs to the traditional region of Styria and is now included in the Savinja Statistical Region.
