= Luče =

- Settlement
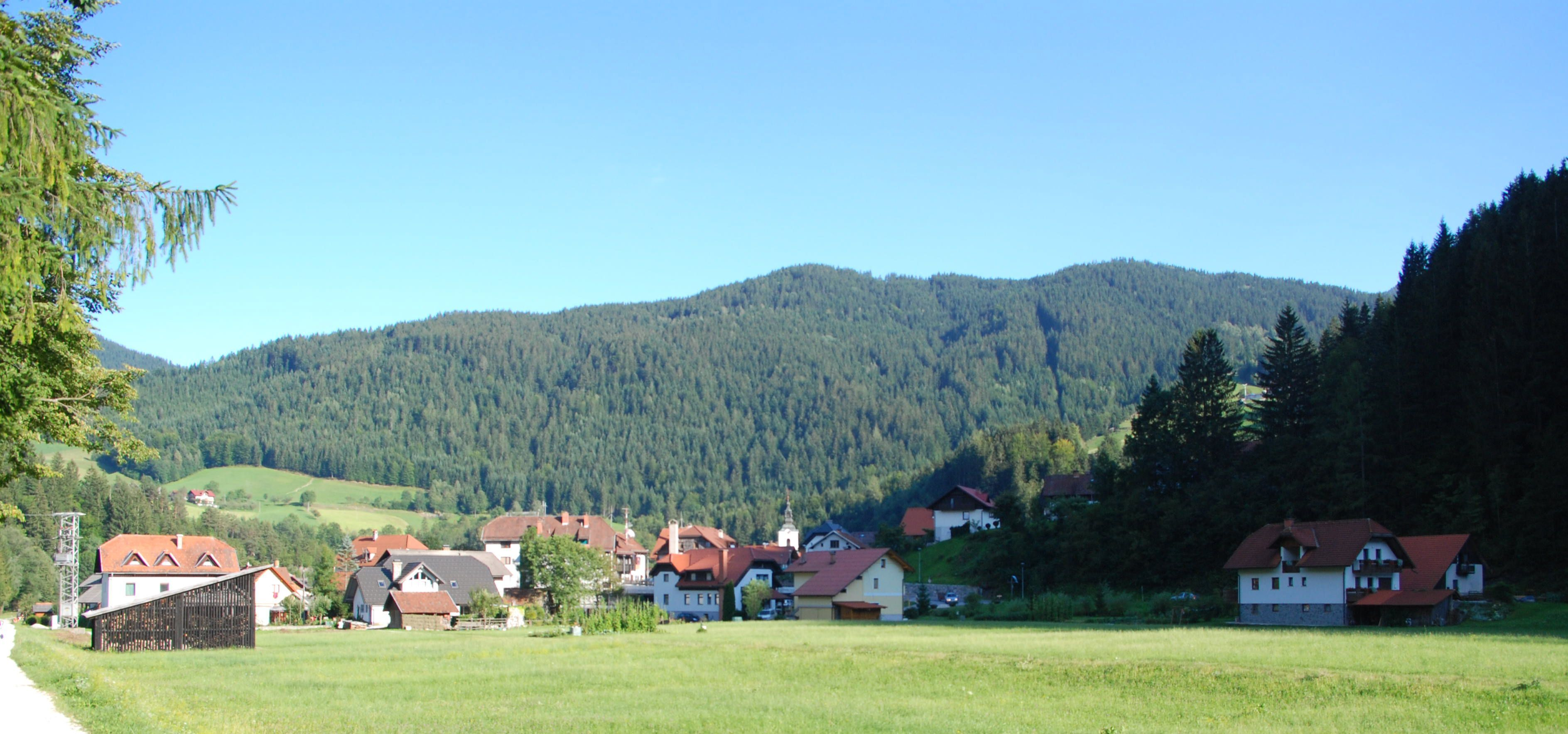
- View of Luče from the north

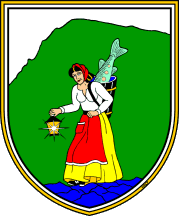
- Coat of arms

- Location of Luče in Slovenia
- Coordinates: 46°21′23.26″N 14°44′37.05″E
- Country: Slovenia

Government
  - Mayor: Ciril Rosc

Area
  - Total: 2.85 km^{2} (1.10 sq mi)

Population (2015)
  - Total: 402
  - Density: 975/km^{2} (2,530/sq mi)
- Time zone: UTC+01 (CET)
  - Summer (DST): UTC+02 (CEST)

Luče (pronounced [ˈluːtʃɛ]; sometimes Luče ob Savinji, German: Leutsch) is the largest settlement and the centre of the Municipality of Luče in northern Slovenia. It belongs to the traditional region of Styria and is now included in the Savinja Statistical Region.

== Geography ==
Luče is home to Snow Cave (Snežna jama) on Mount Raduha, which is the highest-elevation tourist cave in Slovenia.

== Church ==
The parish church in the settlement is dedicated to Saint Lawrence and belongs to the Roman Catholic Diocese of Celje. It was first mentioned in written documents dating to 1423 and has some 17th-century alterations to the original building.

A four-grade girls' school was built in Luče in 1893 under the leadership of the teacher, poet and composer Eliza Frančiška Grizold. The teachers were school sisters from Graz under her leadership.
