= Idrijski Log =

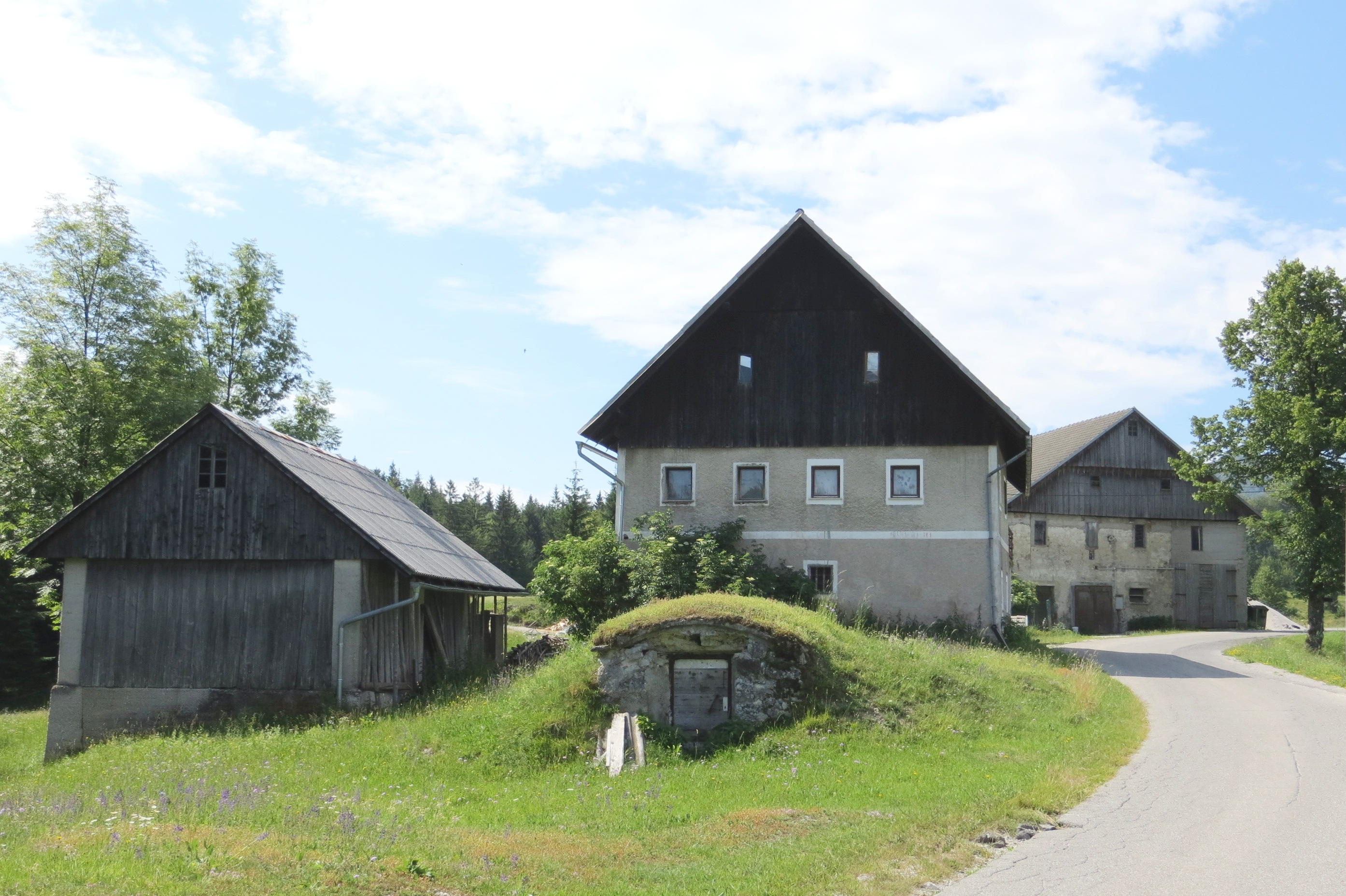

- Location in Slovenia
- Coordinates: 45°57′41.06″N 14°2′14.6″E
- Country: Slovenia
- Traditional region: Inner Carniola
- Statistical region: Gorizia
- Municipality: Idrija

Area
  - Total: 11.67 km^{2} (4.51 sq mi)
- Elevation: 650 m (2,130 ft)

Population (2002)
  - Total: 87

Idrijski Log (pronounced [ˈiːdɾii̯ski ˈloːk]; German: Idriskilog, Italian: Loga d'Idria) is a dispersed settlement on the right bank of the upper course of the Idrijca River in the hills south of Idrija in the traditional Inner Carniola region of Slovenia. In addition to the settlement of Idrijski Log itself, it also includes the hamlets of Koševnik and Na Pevcu.

== Geography ==
Idrijski Log lies on the north end of the Črni Vrh Plateau, which then drops sharply to the Idrijca Valley. It is connected to the hamlet of Podroteja in Idrija by a gravel road with a series of switchbacks and to Godovič by a route known as the French Road (Slovene: francoska cesta), which also leads to Črni Vrh and connects to Zadlog. The settlement lies on heavily karstified wooded land with many karst shafts and losing streams. The main elevations are Krog Hill (794 m), The Hill (Na Griču, 760 m) Grapar Peak (Graparjev vrh, 739 m), Pevc Hill (728 m), Big Peak (Veliki vrh, 721 m), Juniper Hill (Brinov grič, 738 m), Klobučar Hill (694 m), Skalovnik Hill (604 m). Karst caves include the Andrejček Shaft (Andrejčkov brezen) in the hamlet of Koševnik, and the Habeček Shaft (Habečkov brezen) south of this. The water in the shafts drains into Wild Lake and nearby karst springs in Podroteja. Intermittent springs include Pevc Spring (Pevški studenec) and Cold Spring (Mrzli studenec). The most significant watercourse is Mlaka Creek, which disappears into the ground near the Habe farm and formerly powered mills.

== Name ==
The name Idrijski Log literally means 'Idrija meadow'. The name Log is shared with many other settlements in Slovenia and is derived from the Slovene word log 'a partially forested (marshy) meadow near water' or 'woods near a settlement'. It was known as Loga d'Idria in Italian.

== Mass graves ==
Idrijski Log is the site of two known mass graves from the period immediately after the Second World War. The Ajhar Shaft Mass Grave (Slovene: Grobišče Ajharjevo brezno) is located northwest of the village, about 600 meters (2,000 ft) north of the Mohorič farm (Idrijski Log no. 23), along an abandoned road. It contains the remains of unknown victims murdered in late May 1945. The Andrejček Shaft Mass Grave (Grobišče Andrejčkovo brezno) lies in a sinkhole alongside the road from Idrijski Log to Idrija, northeast of the settlement. It contains the remains of an unknown number of Slovene and Italian civilian prisoners that were brought from Trieste and Gorizia and murdered here in late May or on 13 June 1945.

== Cultural heritage ==
Several structures in Idrijski Log are registered as cultural heritage:

- The Andrejček Wayside Shrine (Slovene: Andrejčkovo znamenje) stands next to the house at Idrijski Log no. 4. It consists of a plinth, a tall stone column, and a niche covered by a square hip roof. The niche contains a statue of the Virgin Mary. The shrine dates to the 18th century.
- The Jurij Wayside Shrine (Slovene: Jurijevo znamenje) stands along the forest road between Idrija and Črni Vrh. It is a small wooden cross with a sculpture of the Crucifixion attached to a tree. It is protected by a semicircular metal roof and dates to the 20th century.
- Vojko's Plaque (Slovene: Vojkova plošča) is attached to the face of a cliff in the Idrijca Gorge, along the road from Idrija to Idrijska Bela. It marks the site where the Partisan fighter Janko Premrl (a.k.a. Vojko, 1920–1943) was mortally wounded on 15 February 1943.
- The Semenček House (Slovene: Semenčkova hiša) stands along the main road at Idrijski Log no. 15. It is a two-story house with a steeply pitched tiled roof dating to the end of the 19th century or beginning of the 20th century. The front and side of the house have five bays. The interior preserves a typical room layout and a smoke kitchen.
- Vojko's Hut (Slovene: Vojkova koča) stands above Juniper Hill (Brinov grič) above the village. It is an imperfect 1958 reconstruction of the hut in which the Partisan fighter Janko Premrl died. There is a plaque in front of the hut.
- The Confirmation Wayside Shrine (Slovene: Znamenje pri Birmi) is located along a forest road in the hamlet of Koševnik, about 500 m from the house at Idrijski Log no. 4. It is an inscription on a rock wall that reads "Tu je bila birma u letu 1717 J.B.F." (Confirmation took place here in 1717. J.B.F.).
- The Leskovec Cross Wayside Shrine (Slovene: Znamenje Pri Leskovčevem križu) is a large wooden cross on a stone base bearing the carved numbers 7 and 18. The cross has a cast-iron sculpture of the Crucifixion and is covered by a triangular metal roof. It dates from the end of the 19th century and is located along the main road between Idrijski Log nos. 14 and 15.
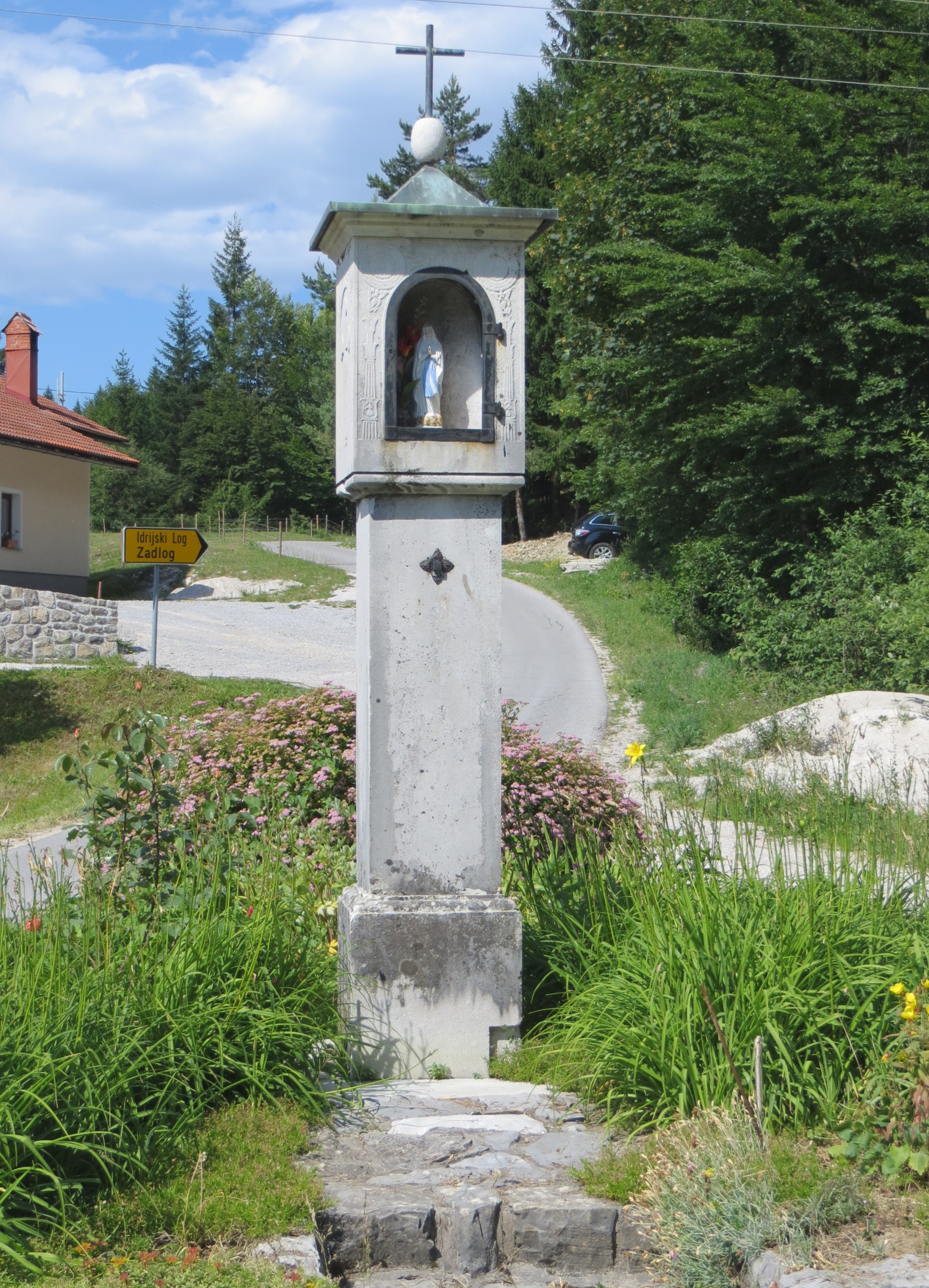
The Andrejček Wayside Shrine

== Notable people ==
Notable people that were born or lived in Idrijski Log include:

- Vlado Krivic (1914–?), communist politician
