= Stanko Premrl =

Slovene Priest and Composer

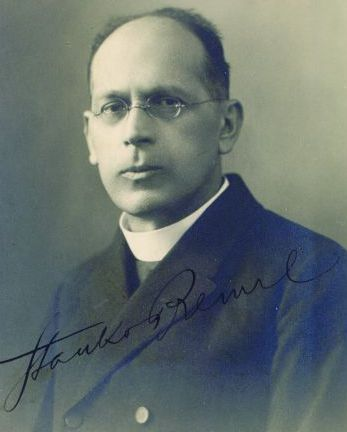
Stanko Premrl

Stanko Premrl (28 September 1880 – 14 March 1965) was a Slovene Roman Catholic priest, composer, and music teacher. He is best known as the composer of the music for the Slovene national anthem, "Zdravljica".

Premrl was born in the village of Šent Vid (now Podnanos) in the upper Vipava Valley, in what was then the Austro-Hungarian Duchy of Carniola (now in Slovenia).

He graduated from the music conservatory in Vienna. From 1909 to 1939, he served as music director at the Ljubljana Cathedral. Between 1908 and 1939, he was head of the organ school in Ljubljana. He collaborated with many Slovenian organists, such as Ana Roner Lavrič.

He was a significant influence on the development of Slovenian church music. He was one of the most prolific Slovenian composers of the 20th century, publishing over 2,000 songs. On 24 September 1905 he composed the music for France Prešeren's patriotic poem Zdravljica. Premrl's composition soon prevailed as the most popular music for the song; by the 1940s, it had become one of the most popular Slovene patriotic songs. In 1989, it was officially adopted as the regional anthem of the Socialist Republic of Slovenia, then a part of Yugoslavia. In 1991, it became the national anthem of independent Slovenia.

Stanko Premrl was the uncle of the Slovenian Partisan resistance fighter Janko Premrl, a.k.a. Vojko.
