= Malo Ubeljsko =

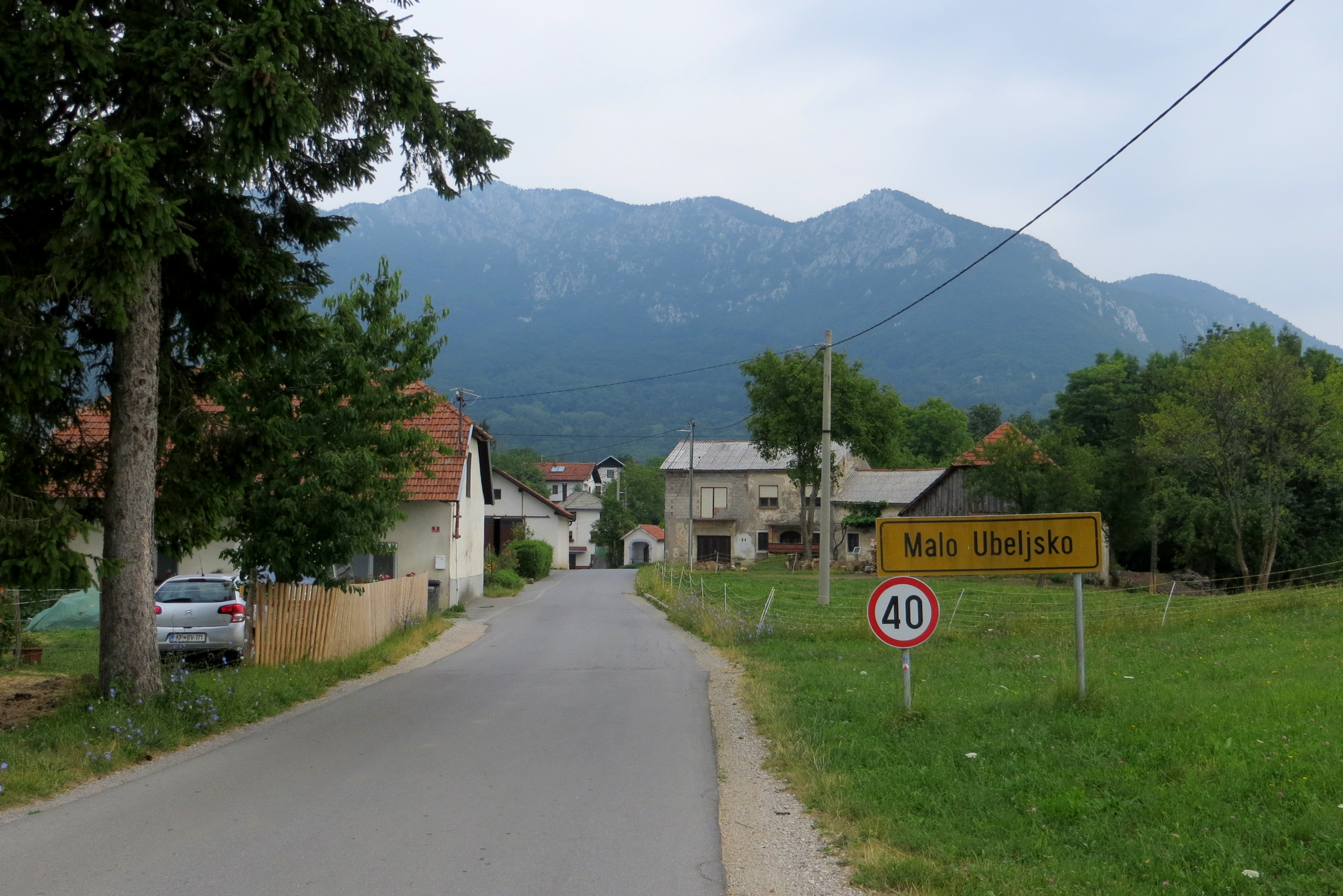

- Location in Slovenia
- Coordinates: 45°46′20.52″N 14°4′55.36″E
- Country: Slovenia
- Traditional region: Inner Carniola
- Statistical region: Littoral–Inner Carniola
- Municipality: Postojna

Area
  - Total: 2.47 km^{2} (0.95 sq mi)
- Elevation: 565.5 m (1,855 ft)

Population (2002)
  - Total: 55

Malo Ubeljsko (pronounced [ˈmaːlɔ ˈuːbəlskɔ]; Italian: Oblisca piccola, German: Kleinubelsko) is a small village below the eastern slopes of the Nanos Plateau in the Municipality of Postojna in the Inner Carniola region of Slovenia.

== Name ==
Together with neighboring Veliko Ubeljsko (literally, 'big Ubeljsko'), Malo Ubeljsko (literally, 'little Ubeljsko') was mentioned in written sources circa 1200 as ze Vlbelzch (and as Vbelczk in 1402, Vlbliczk and Vbelicz in 1485, and Vbelskh in 1498). The name may be derived from the common noun *ǫbъlъ '(deep) spring'; there are several major springs in the area.
