= Janko Premrl =

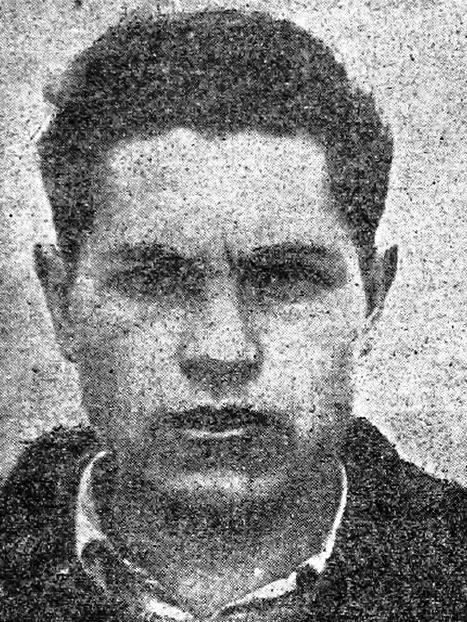
- Janko Premrl
- Born: 29 February 1920; Podnanos, Kingdom of Italy (Now Podnanos, Slovenia)
- Died: 22 February 1943 (aged 22); Idrijski Log, Kingdom of Italy
- Other name: Vojko
- Known for: People's Hero of Yugoslavia

Janko Premrl (nom de guerre Vojko; Italianized: Giovanni Premoli) (29 February 1920 – 22 February 1943) was a Slovene Partisan.

== Life ==
Premrl was born on 29 February 1920 in Podnanos, at that time in Italy (now in Slovenia). He was the firstborn child in an ethnically conscious Slovene family. His uncle Stanko Premrl was a Roman Catholic priest, and well-known composer and organist, composer of the melody for the national anthem of Slovenia. Another of his uncles was a major in the armed forces of the Kingdom of Yugoslavia.

Premrl attended a secondary business school in Gorizia, where he gathered like-minded individuals around himself. Matters often came to blows between the ethnic Slovenes and the local Fascists, and eventually his father withdrew him from school because of this. He continued learning on his own after he no longer attended school.

He participated in the anti-Fascist movement. Through contacts in Ljubljana he was able to acquire and distribute Slovene books. He advocated a policy of resistance against the Italian authorities and, among other things, prepared an unsuccessful assassination attempt against the Italian teacher and Fascist party secretary in Podnanos. Premrl served in the Italian army from 1940 to 1941. In January 1942 the noncommissioned officer and leader of a Slovene circle, Ivan Kosovel (1912–1943), obtained sick leave papers for Premrl, whereupon he deserted the Italian Army.

Because the Italians had burned his family's home and interned his family in a prison camp, Premrl joined the Partisans immediately and became a soldier in the Littoral Company (Primorska četa) on 3 February 1942. He distinguished himself as the leader of a group of Partisans on 18 April that year in a battle on the Nanos Plateau and in eight other successful operations in the following three months.

In May 1942 he was sentenced to death in absentia by the Fascist Special Tribunal for the Defense of the State in Rome. On 20 August the prefect of Gorizia, Aldo Cavani, issued a warrant for his arrest and placed a 50,000 lira bounty on his head.

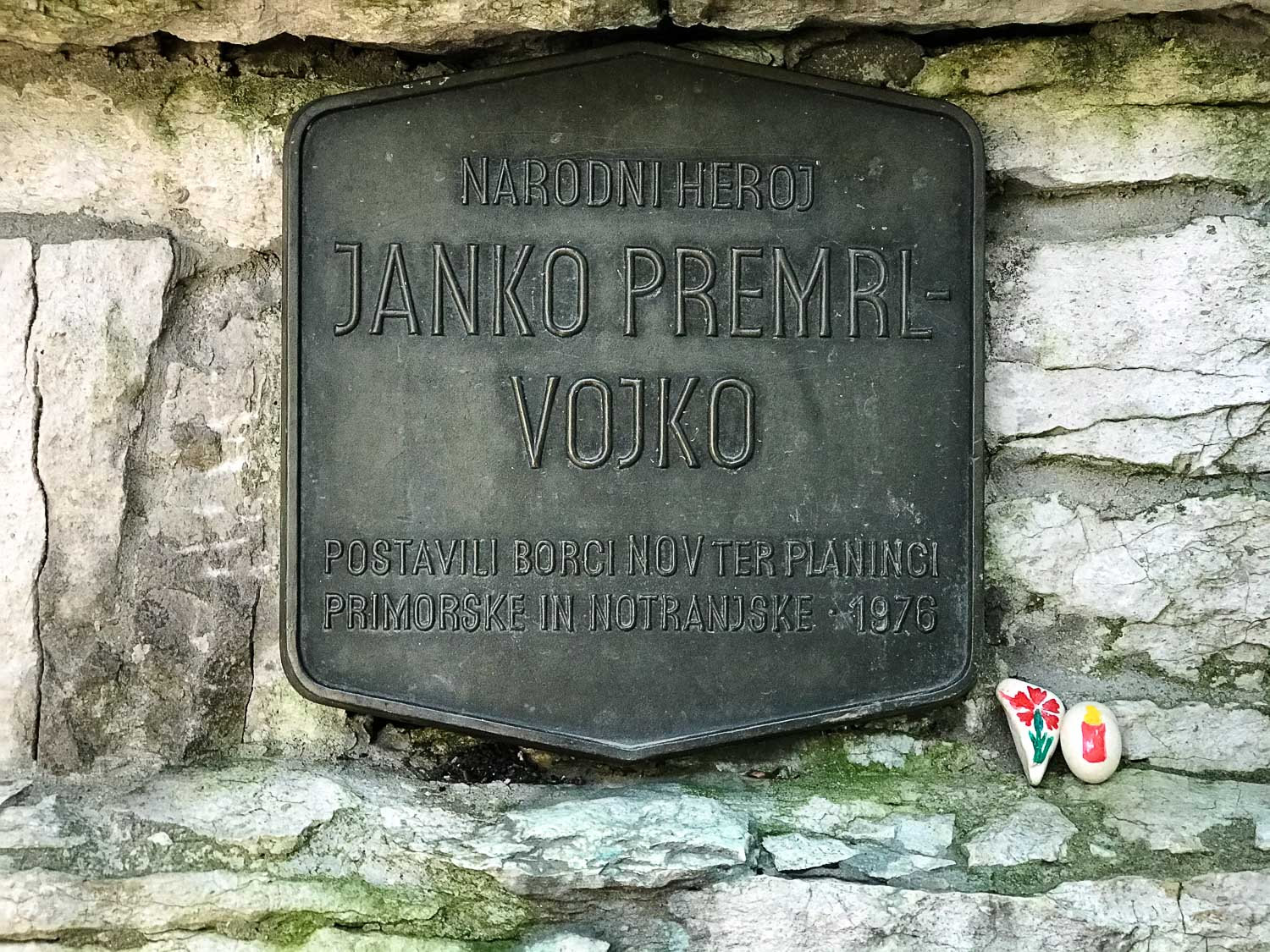
Memorial for Janko Premrl Vojko near the Vojko Lodge on the Nanos Plateau

When the Simon Gregorčič Brigade was established, Premrl was named its deputy commandant, and he became the commander of the Upper Vipava Company, and then the Trnovo Company. In the second half of September 1942 he and his company encamped at Črni Vrh, first near Gornje Griže and then at Brin Hill (Brinov Grič). From this position the company was able to observe the Trnovo Forest Plateau (Slovene: Trnovski gozd). Because the camp was well hidden, they remained there six months.

On 13 February 1943 the Headquarters of the Littoral Operations Zone named Premrl commandant of the Andrej Laharnar 1st Littoral Partisan Brigade. Because of Premrl’s death soon after and the engagement of units recruiting volunteers in central Slovenia, this brigade was never actually formed.

On 15 February 1943 a Fascist post was being repositioned from Brus at Idrijska Bela to Idrija. It was attacked by two Partisan squads under Premrl's command.

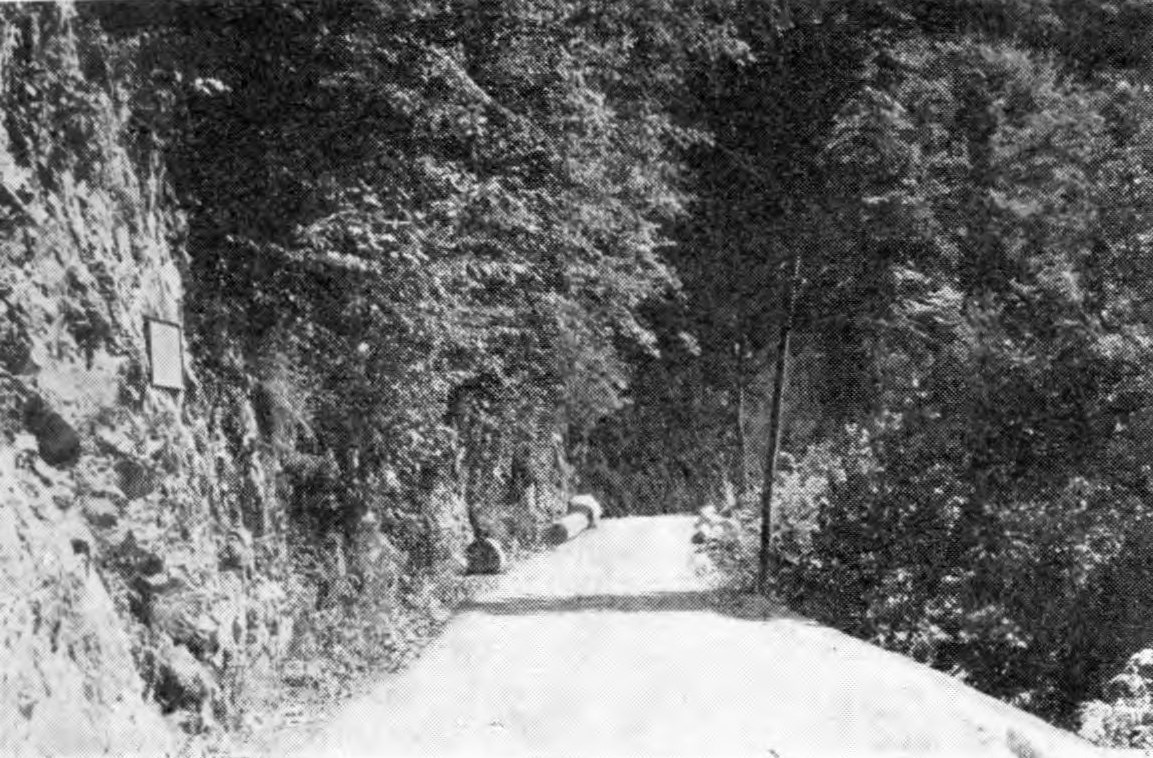
The site where Premrl was mortally wounded, with Vojko's Plaque visible on the left

The official version of Premrl's death claims that during the battle he ran towards the second squad in order to keep then from a hazard and was struck by a bullet from an Italian dugout. Because Premrl was seriously wounded, the company withdrew to a camp on Brin Hill in Idrijski Log. However, another version of his death claims that he was shot in the back by his fellow Partisans because his morals and religious faith were out of step with Communist principles. This version of Premrl’s death was also supported by his sister based on eyewitness accounts.

Although a doctor was requested, Premrl only received instructions from Idrija for medical treatment, and so his condition worsened. Premrl died of his injuries on 22 February 1943.

Premrl was named a people's hero of Yugoslavia at the second AVNOJ conference in the Bosnian town of Jajce, held from 21 to 29 November 1943.

== Legacy ==
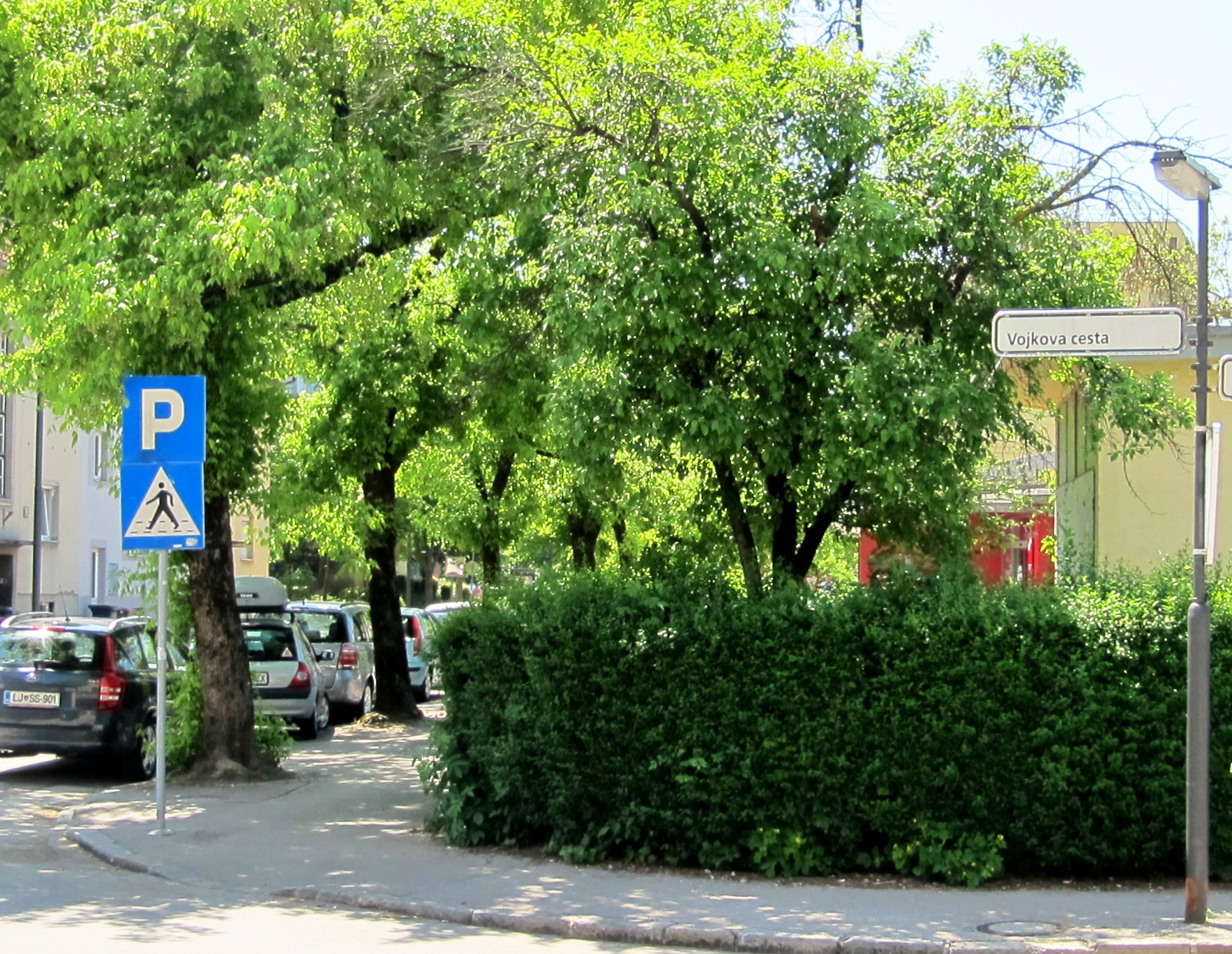
Vojko Street in the Bežigrad District of Ljubljana

There are streets named after Premrl in the Slovenian towns of Ljubljana, Koper, Nova Gorica, Solkan, Vipava, Anhovo, Plave, and Portorož, as well as in Belgrade, Serbia.

A lodge known as Vojko's Lodge on the Nanos Plateau (Vojkova koča na Nanosu) was built and named after Premrl in 1949. A bust of Premrl stands near the lodge.

A memorial known as Vojko's Plaque (Vojkova plošča), marking the spot where Premrl was mortally wounded, is a landmark along the Idrijca River about 2 km south of Idrija. The Cave at Vojko’s Plaque (Jama pri Vojkovi plošči) is in turn named after this landmark.

Until 1 September 2006, Janko "Vojko" Premrl Primary School of Koper (Osnovna šola Janka Premrla-Vojka Koper) was named for Premrl.
