= Battle of Nanos =

Coordinates: 45°47′54.76″N 14°3′54.57″E

- Part of World War II in Yugoslavia
| Date | 18 April, 1942 |
| Location | Nanos, Slovene Littoral |
| Result | Italian victory |

Belligerents
| Italy | Slovene Partisans |

Commanders and leaders
| Unknown | Janko Premrl |

Strength
| 800 | 54 |

Casualties and losses
| Unknown | 10 killed 11 captured |

The Battle of Nanos (Slovene: bitka na Nanosu) was a battle in World War II that took place on Nanos Plateau on 18 April 1942, when 800 Italian soldiers laid siege to 54 Slovene Partisans. Ten Partisans were killed and eleven captured, while the rest escaped the encirclement. This was one of the first battles between the Partisan insurgence in the Slovene Littoral, led by Janko Premrl, and the Italian Army.
