= Naprej, zastava slave =

1860–1989 national anthem of Slovenia

English: Forward, Flag of Glory
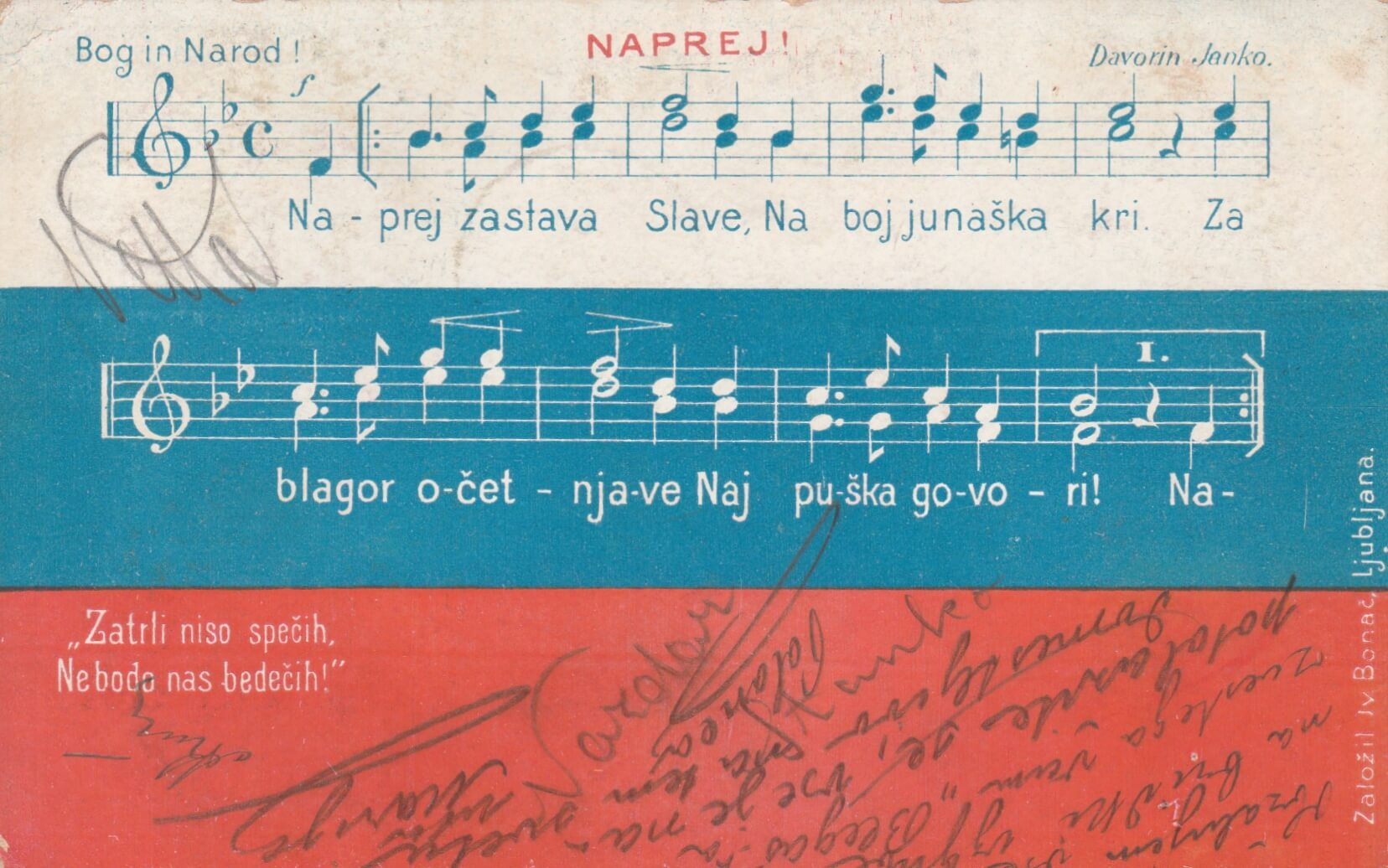
- Former regional anthem of Slovenia Military anthem of the Slovenian Armed Forces Song of the President of Slovenia Anthem of the Slovenian nation
- Lyrics: Simon Jenko, 1860
- Music: Davorin Jenko, 1860
- Adopted: 1860 (as the anthem of Slovenian nation); 1919 (as part of Anthem of Yugoslavia); 1995 (by the Slovenian Armed Forces)
- Relinquished: 1941 (as part of Anthem of Yugoslavia); 1989 (by Slovenia)
- Succeeded by: "Zdravljica"

Audio sample
- "Naprej, zastava slave": file; help

"Naprej, zastava slave" or "Naprej, zastava Slave" (Note: The word slava was written uncapitalized by Jenko, as a deliberate double neaning: the uncapitalized word is a common noun meaning "glory," while Slava was during the 19th century a poetic term for the Slavic peoples generally. The word was capitalized in 1863. Nowadays, it is written with small letters.) (Forward, Flag of Glory) is an anthem of the Slovene nation. Written in 1860, it was a popular patriotic song for decades, and was incorporated into the national anthem of the Kingdom of Yugoslavia. It later saw use as the unofficial anthem of SR Slovenia from the early 1970s until 1989. It is now used as the official anthem of the Slovenian Armed Forces.

== Lyrics and music ==
The lyrics consist of two parts: the first two stanzas are a call for the defense of the fatherland, while the second two take the form of an oration by a young man about to head to battle. The overall sentiment is patriotic and exhortatory.

The poem was originally titled merely "Naprej" ("Forward"). The original lyrics were written by Simon Jenko; they were improved by his cousin Davorin Jenko, who - motivated by private anger at the ill-treatment of Slavs by Germans - set the poem to music in an inn in Vienna's Prater (Note: Davorin Jenko also composed the Serbian anthem "Bože pravde" (God of Justice) in 1872.) on May 16th of 1860.

The song was first performed with great success in front of a large Slavic audience on 22 October 1860, and was first published in Slovenski glasnik (English: The Slovene Herald) on 1 December of that year. In 1863, it was renamed by Radoslav Razlag to Naprej, zastava Slave. In 1885, it became the first Slovene poem to be translated into English, under the title "With Slava's Banner, Forward!" The translators were Andrej Jurtela, the first lecturer of Slavic languages at the University of Oxford, and English journalist Alfred Lloyd Hardy, who had a keen interest in music and in Slavic culture. He arranged the melody by Davorin Jenko for piano, wrote an interlinear translation and published it lithographed as an independent publication.

== History ==
=== Austria-Hungary; Kingdom of Yugoslavia ===
Despite its blunt pan-Slavic message, the song was never banned during the Austro-Hungarian period, and was even occasionally used to rally Slovene patriotism in service to the Austrian state, for example appearing on World War I postcards. During the collapse of Austria-Hungary, it acquired a more nationalistic reputation, becoming associated with the troops who - under general Rudolf Maister - succeeded in presering Slovene sovereignty in southern Styria in November 1918.

After the formation of the Kingdom of Serbs, Croats, and Slovenes in 1918, the first and last stanzas of the song were incorporated into the Yugoslav national anthem. The stanzas formed the third part of a medley, also including the prewar Serbian anthem "Bože pravde" and the Croatian patriotic song "Lijepa naša domovino". The song had been selected as the most characteristic patriotic song of the Slovene people.

=== WWII and Communist Era ===
During the Nazi occupation of Slovenia, "Naprej, zastava slave" served as the station-identification melody of "Kričač", an underground radio station operated by the Slovene Liberation Front,; it was also sung at flag-raising and -lowering ceremonies by the Slovene Partisans. Due to its relatively apolitical nature, the song was also popular with the collaborationist Home Guard militia, who often used it as a marching song. It was notably performed at mass rallies held at Bežigrad stadium in 1944 and 1945, at which the Guard swore personal allegiance to Adolf Hitler.

With the establishment of the Federal People's Republic of Yugoslavia in 1946, the compound royal Yugoslav anthem was replaced by another 19th century pan-Slavic song, "Hey, Slavs". None of the three constitutions of the post-war People's Republic of Slovenia - adopted in 1946, 1963, and 1974 - specified a republican anthem, but "Naprej, zastava slave" was - again due to its apolitical nature - never deprecated by the Communist authorities, and following the Yugoslav liberalization of the late 1960s, it began to be used at republic-level official events, albeit on an informal basis.

== Current role ==
In 1989, Naprej, Zastave Slave was officially replaced as the Slovene national anthem by "Zdravljica".

Due to its patriotic and militant themes, the song has since 1992 been played at the oathtaking ceremonies if the Slovenian Territorial Defence, in line with the draft Rules on Service in the Territorial Defence, adopted on 15 April 1992. It is the current anthem of the Slovenian Armed Forces, based on a government decree from 1995. It is also performed (though the lyrics are only rarely sung) at official appearances of the President of Slovenia in his or her role as Commander-in-Chief of the Armed Forces.

== Lyrics ==
Slovenian original

Refren:
Naprej zastava slave,
na boj junaška kri
za blagor očetnjave
𝄆 naj puška govori! 𝄇

Z orožjem in desnico,
nesimo vragu grom,
zapisat v kri pravico,
𝄆 ki terja jo naš dom. 𝄇

Refren

Draga mati je prosila,
roke okol vrata vila,
je plakala moja mila,
tu ostani ljubi moj!

Zbogom mati, ljuba zdrava,
mati mi je očetnjava,
ljuba moja čast in slava,
𝄆 hajdmo, hajdmo, zanjo v boj! 𝄇

Refren

Naprej! Naprej!

English translation

Chorus:
Onward, flag of glory,
to battle, blood of heroes!
for the sake of the fatherland
𝄆 let the rifle speak! 𝄇

With weapon and right hand,
let us carry thunder to the enemy
to write in blood the justice
𝄆 that our home deserves. 𝄇

Chorus

My dear mother pled,
twining her arms around my neck,
my dearest one wept:
stay here, my beloved!

Farewell mother, dear and hale,
my mother is the fatherland,
my love is honour and glory,
𝄆 let's go, let's go, into battle for her! 𝄇

Chorus

Onward! Onward!
