= Veliko Ubeljsko =

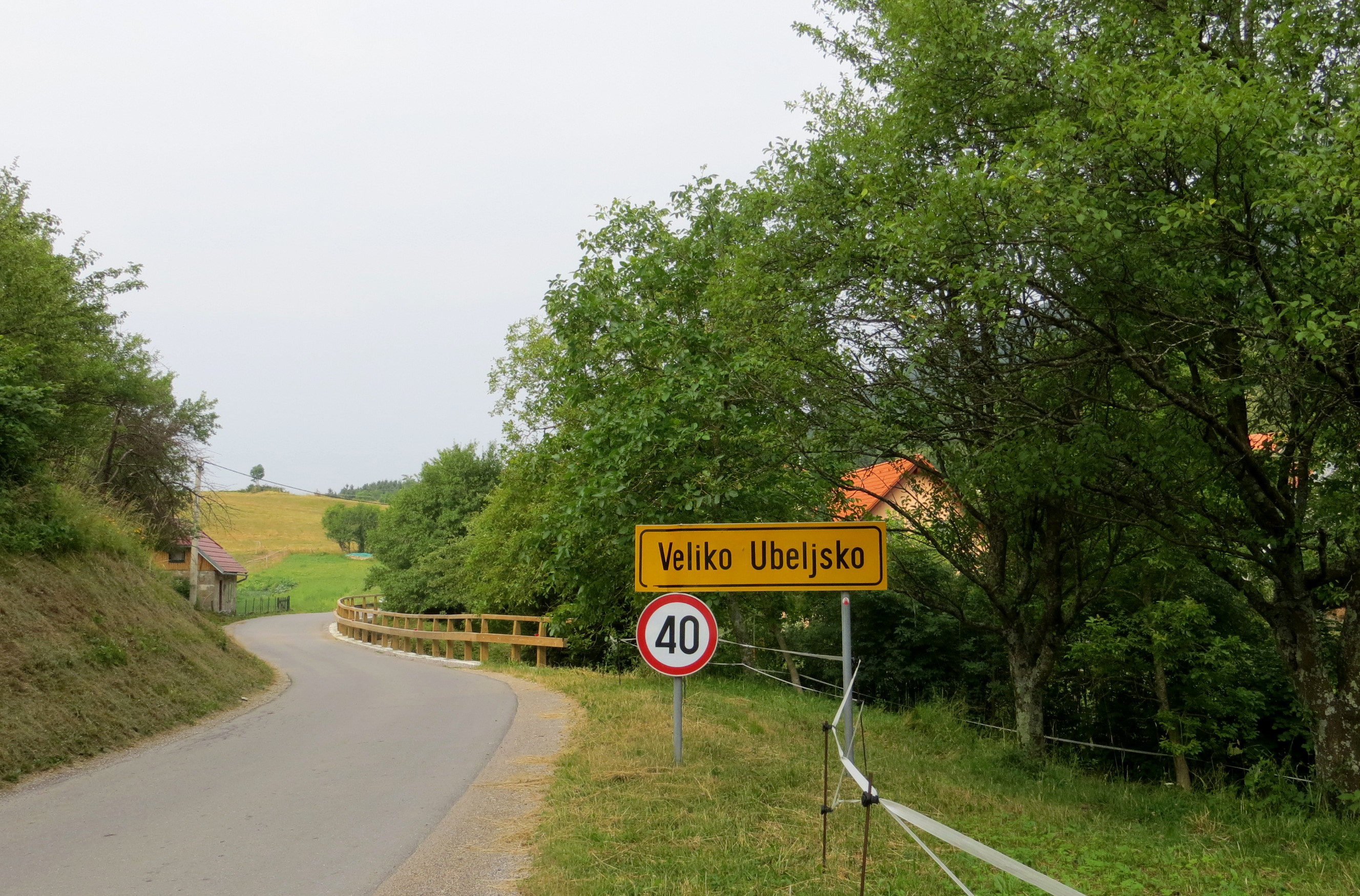

- Location in Slovenia
- Coordinates: 45°46′19.62″N 14°4′24.36″E
- Country: Slovenia
- Traditional region: Inner Carniola
- Statistical region: Littoral–Inner Carniola
- Municipality: Postojna

Area
  - Total: 6.03 km^{2} (2.33 sq mi)
- Elevation: 587.9 m (1,929 ft)

Population (2002)
  - Total: 90

Veliko Ubeljsko (pronounced [ˈʋeːlikɔ ˈuːbəlskɔ]; Italian: Oblisca grande, German: Großubelsko) is a village in the southeastern foothills of the Nanos Plateau in the Municipality of Postojna in the Inner Carniola region of Slovenia.

== Name ==
Together with neighboring Malo Ubeljsko (literally, 'little Ubeljsko'), Veliko Ubeljsko (literally, 'big Ubeljsko') was mentioned in written sources circa 1200 as ze Vlbelzch (and as Vbelczk in 1402, Vlbliczk and Vbelicz in 1485, and Vbelskh in 1498). The name may be derived from the common noun *ǫbъlъ '(deep) spring'; there are several major springs in the area.

== Church ==
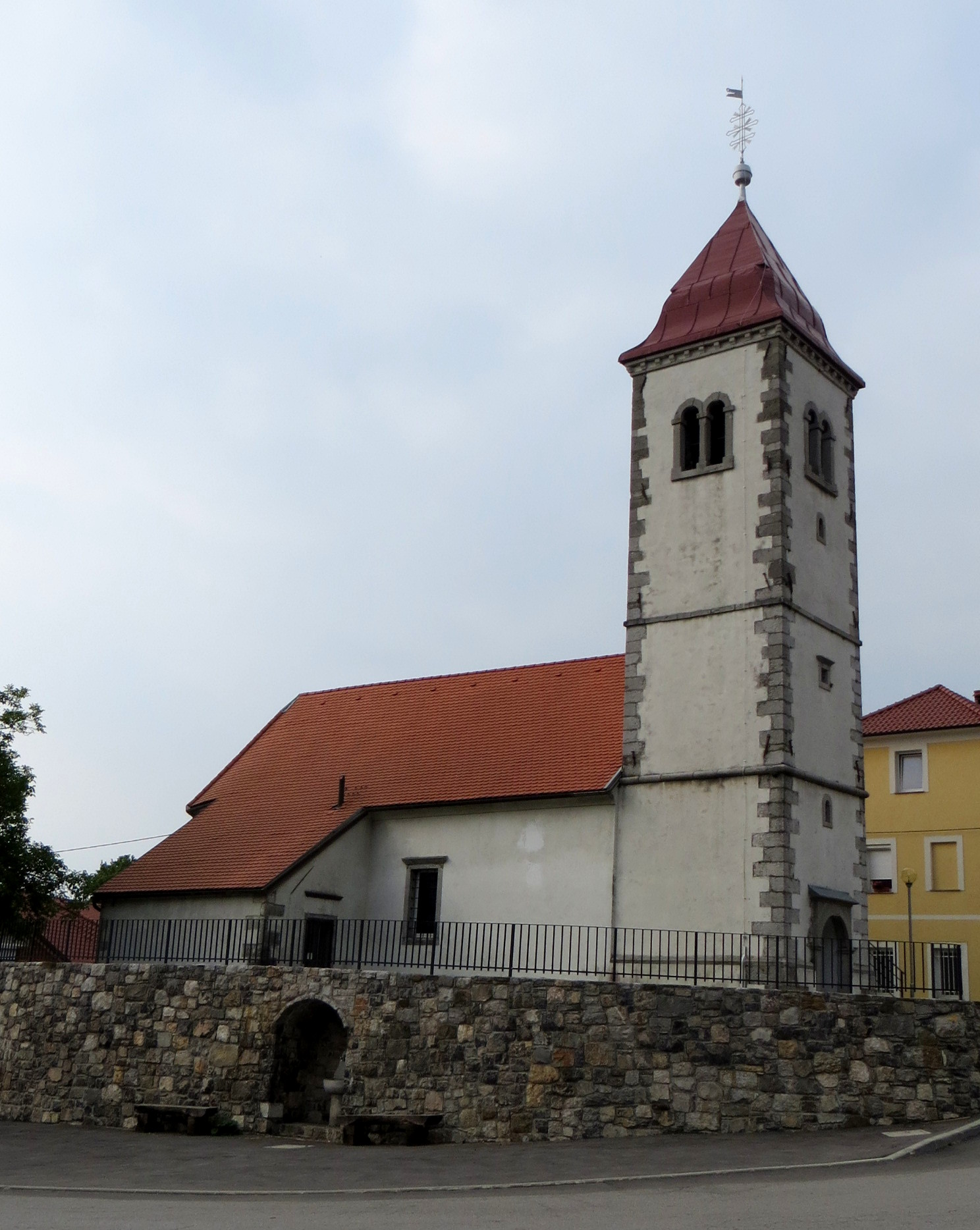
Saint Ulrich's Church

The Ubeljsko parish church in the settlement is dedicated to Saint Ulrich (Slovene: sveti Urh) and belongs to the Koper Diocese. A small church on the slopes of Nanos north of the settlement also belongs to this parish and is dedicated to Saint Bricius.
