= Vojko's Plaque =

Coordinates: 45°58′3.47″N 14°00′57.85″E

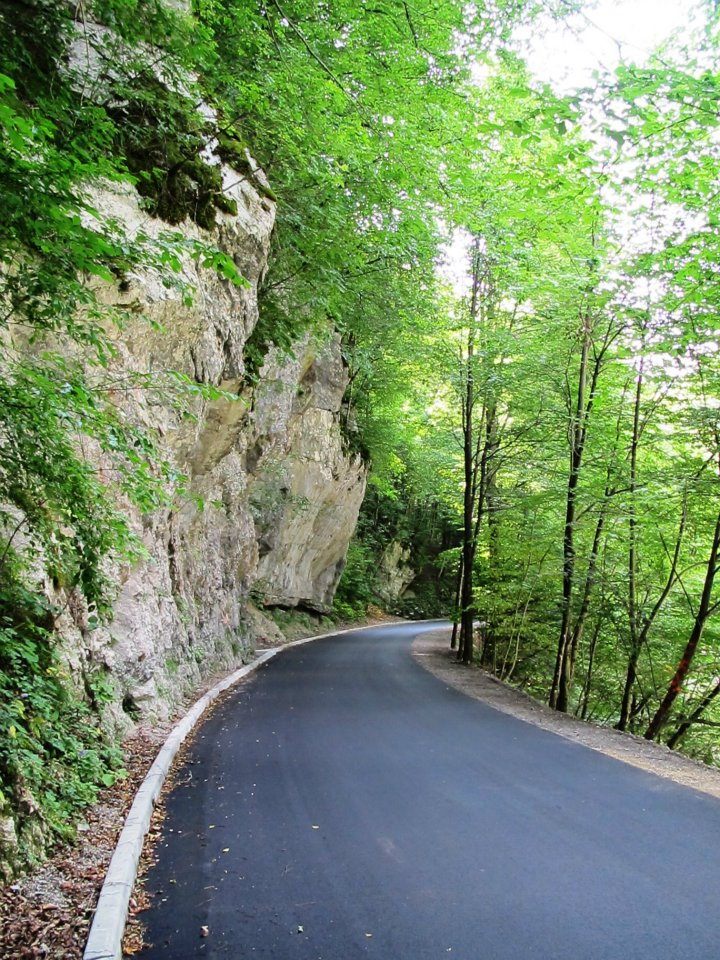
The Idrijca Gorge near Vojko's Plaque

Vojko's Plaque (Slovene: Vojkova plošča) is a local landmark in the Idrijca Gorge in the settlement of Idrijski Log, western Slovenia. This is a plaque that marks the site where the Partisan fighter Janko Premrl (nom de guerre Vojko, 1920–1943) was mortally wounded on 15 February 1943. He died a week later, on 22 February 1943, at Brin Hill (Brinov grič) in Idrijski Log.

The bronze plaque was unveiled on 16 May 1955 and is registered as cultural heritage. It consists of three overlapping panels. The text of the plaque on the central panel reads "The People's Hero Janko 'Vojko' Premrl was mortally wounded here on 15 February 1943" (Tukaj je bil 15. 2. 1943 smrtno ranjen narodni heroj Janko Premrl Vojko), flanked by a five-pointed star to the left and a bas-relief bust of Premrl to the right. The plaque is encountered as a landmark with reference to geology and hiking. The Cave at Vojko’s Plaque (Jama pri Vojkovi plošči) is named after this landmark.
