= Socialist Republic of Slovenia =

Federated state of Yugoslavia (1945–1991)

Coordinates: 46.0500°N 14.5000°E

Socialist Republic of Slovenia (Note: Historical names: 1945-1946: Federal Slovenia (Slovene: Federalna Slovenija); 1946-1963: People's Republic of Slovenia (Slovene: Ljudska republika Slovenija)) (1963–1990) Socialistična republika Slovenija (Slovene) Republic of Slovenia (1990–1991) Republika Slovenija (Slovene)
- 1945–1991
- Flag Emblem
- Anthem: Naprej, zastava slave (English: "Forward, Flag of Glory") (1972–1990) Zdravljica (English: "A Toast") (from 1990)
- Slovenia within Yugoslavia
- Status: Constituent republic of Yugoslavia
- Capital: Ljubljana
- Common languages: Slovene
- Government: 1945–1989: Unitary communist state 1989–1991: Unitary parliamentary republic
- Head of state
  - 1945–1953: Josip Vidmar (first)
  - 1990–1991: Milan Kučan (last)
- Head of government
  - 1945–1946: Boris Kidrič (first)
  - 1990–1991: Lojze Peterle (last)
- Leader of the ZKS
  - 1945–1946: Boris Kidrič (first)
  - 1989–1990: Ciril Ribičič (last)
- Historical era: Cold War
  - SNOS: 19 February 1945
  - Referendum: 23 December 1990
  - Independence declared: 25 June 1991
  - Ten-Day War: 27 June – 7 July 1991
  - Recognized: 12 January 1992
- HDI (1991): 0.772 high
- ISO 3166 code: SI
Preceded by
1945: Italian Social Republic
Operational Zone of the Adriatic Littoral
Kingdom of Hungary
1954: Free Territory of Trieste
Succeeded by
Slovenia
- Today part of: Slovenia

The Socialist Republic of Slovenia, (Note: Slovene: Socialistična republika Slovenija, Serbo-Croatian: Socijalistička Republika Slovenija / Социјалистичка Република Словенија) commonly referred to as Socialist Slovenia or simply Slovenia, was one of the six federal republics forming Yugoslavia and the nation state of the Slovenes. It existed under various names from its creation on 29 November 1945 until 25 June 1991.

In early 1990, the government dismantled the single-party system of government – installed by the League of Communists – and adopted a multi-party democracy. Republic of Slovenia dropped the 'Socialist' label shortly after and in late 1990 cast a successful public vote for independence, which it formally declared on 25 June 1991 and achieved after the brief Ten-Day War.

== Names ==
The republic was first officially named Federal Slovenia (Slovene: Federalna Slovenija, Serbo-Croatian: Federalna Slovenija / Федерална Словенија) until 20 February 1946, when it was renamed the People's Republic of Slovenia (Slovene: Ljudska republika Slovenija, Serbo-Croatian: Narodna Republika Slovenija / Народна Република Словенија). It retained this name until 9 April 1963, when its name was changed again, this time to Socialist Republic of Slovenia (Slovene: Socialistična republika Slovenija, Serbo-Croatian: Socijalistička Republika Slovenija / Социјалистичка Република Словенија).

On 8 March 1990, the Socialist Republic of Slovenia removed the prefix "Socialist" from its name, becoming the Republic of Slovenia, though remaining a constituent state of the Socialist Federal Republic of Yugoslavia until 25 June 1991, when it enacted the laws resulting in independence.

== Economy ==
Although it comprised only about one-eleventh of Yugoslavia's total population, it was the most productive of the Yugoslav republics, accounting for one-fifth of its GDP and one-third of its exports.

=== GDP per capita of republics and autonomous provinces ===
Indexed GDP per capita by federal unit
Federal unit	1953	1955	1960	1965	1970	1975	1980	1985	1989
SR Slovenia	161.1	174.9	180.4	183.2	193.7	205.3	200.5	203.1	199.0
SR Croatia	115.4	122.5	119.2	120.3	123.6	123.1	125.6	125.3	125.6
SAP Vojvodina	99.4	93.6	107.9	112.5	107.4	115.1	113.5	117.8	119.0
SR Serbia	96.8	90.8	96.4	96.3	96.5	96.7	98.7	99.2	103.1
SR Montenegro	74.8	77.2	64.5	76.3	77.2	69.1	79.6	78.0	73.5
SR Bosnia and Herzegovina	85.7	83.3	76.0	71.7	67.6	65.8	65.6	68.7	67.9
SR Macedonia	68.0	68.4	63.9	66.6	70.0	68.0	66.3	64.2	65.7
SAP Kosovo	45.8	42.5	37.4	36.5	34.1	33.4	28.6	27.7	25.6

== Independence ==
In September 1989, numerous constitutional amendments were passed by the Assembly of the Socialist Republic of Slovenia, which introduced parliamentary democracy to the country. The same year Action North both united the opposition and democratized communist establishment in Slovenia as the first defense action against Milošević's supporters' attacks, leading to Slovenian independence.

The word 'Socialist' was removed from the name of the then state on 7 March 1990. The socialist infrastructure was largely dissolved. The first open democratic election was held on 8 April 1990. The parliamentary elections were won by the opposition, known as the DEMOS coalition led by the dissident Jože Pučnik. At the same time, Milan Kučan, the former chairman of the League of Communists of Slovenia (ZKS), was elected President of the Republic. The democratically elected parliament nominated the Christian Democratic leader Lojze Peterle as Prime Minister, which effectively ended the 45-year-long rule of the Communist Party. During this period, Slovenia retained its old flag and coat of arms, and most of the previous symbols as it awaited the creation of new symbols that would eventually come after independence. The old national anthem, Naprej zastava slave, had already been replaced by the Zdravljica in March 1990.

On 23 December 1990, a referendum on independence was held in Slovenia, at which 94.8% of the voters (88.5% of the overall electorate) voted in favour of separation of Slovenia from Yugoslavia. On 25 June 1991, the acts about the Slovenian independence were passed by the Assembly; Slovenia was immediately recognized by likewise declared Croatia and it recognized the latter in kind. Following a short Ten-Day War, the military of Slovenia secured its independence; by the end of the year, its independence was recognized by the wider international community.

== See also ==
- Subdivisions of the Kingdom of Yugoslavia
