= National anthem of Slovenia =

Zdravljica
English: 'Toast'
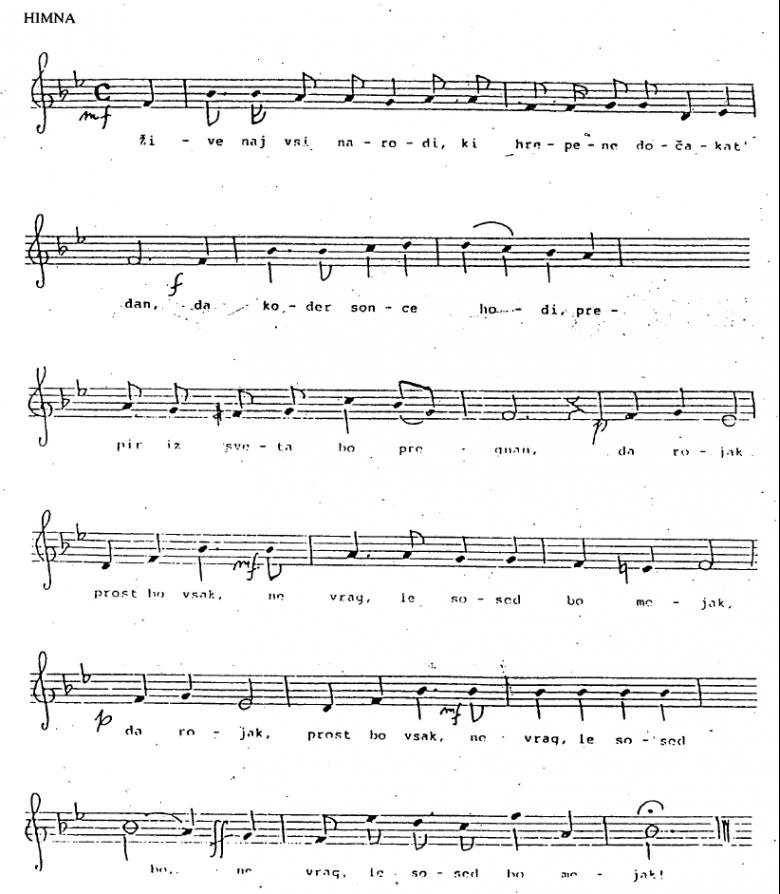
- The national anthem of Slovenia as defined in the 1994 law adopting it. As typically performed, it consists of a part of the "Zdravljica" poem, specifically the 7th stanza, which is frequently regarded as the national anthem.
- National anthem of Slovenia
- Lyrics: France Prešeren, 1844
- Music: Stanko Premrl, 1905
- Adopted: 1989 (as regional anthem); 1994 (as national anthem)
- Preceded by: "Naprej, zastava slave"

Audio sample
- U.S. Navy Band instrumental rendition in B-flat major: file; help

The national anthem of Slovenia is one of the verses of "Zdravljica", a carmen figuratum poem by the 19th-century Romantic Slovene poet France Prešeren, inspired by the ideals of Liberté, égalité, fraternité, and set to music by Stanko Premrl. It is one of the national symbols of Slovenia, along with its flag and coat of arms.

== History ==
=== Background ===
Historically, the national anthem from 1860 until the beginning of the 1990s, was "Naprej, zastava slave" ("Forward, Flag of Glory"), (Note: Where the last word can be capitalized to mean "Slavic" instead of "Glory", but despite a popular interpretation that it could refer to the Slavic people in general, the word slava was written uncapitalised by Jenko. It was capitalised by public in 1863. Nowadays, it is written with small letters.) the first ever piece of Slovene literature to be translated into English.

=== Lyrics and music ===
The words of the current Slovene national anthem are all or part (Note: The question whether the entire "Zdravljica" or only its seventh stanza constitutes the Slovene national anthem, remains unresolved. Whereas the Constitution of Slovenia determines the title of the poem, the Act about the anthem specifically determines its seventh stanza. It has been argued that the act contradicts the constitution and that the question should be resolved by the Slovenian Constitutional Court. In practice, mostly only the seventh stanza is sung and reproduced as the national anthem.) of "Zdravljica", written by the 19th-century Slovene poet France Prešeren for which music was written by the Slovene composer Stanko Premrl in 1905. Emphasising internationalism, it was defined in 1994 as the anthem with the Act on the national symbols of Slovenia. However, even before the breakup of Yugoslavia, the lyrics and music were together adopted as the regional anthem of the Socialist Republic of Slovenia on 27 September 1989. Therefore, it was the regional anthem of the Socialist Republic of Slovenia (known as simply the "Republic of Slovenia" from 1990 to 1991) as a constituent republic of Yugoslavia from 8 March 1990 to 25 June 1991, as well.

=== Legal status ===
As a work of arts, published in the official journal Official Gazette (Uradni list), the text and melody of the seventh stanza of "Zdravljica" qualify as an official work and are per Article 9 of the Slovene Copyright and Related Rights Act not protected by the copyrights. Their usage is regulated by the Act Regulating the Coat-of-Arms, Flag and Anthem of the Republic of Slovenia and the Flag of the Slovene Nation (Zakon o grbu, zastavi in himni Republike Slovenije ter o slovenski narodni zastavi), published in the Official Gazette in 1994. The official melody is played in B-flat major.

== Lyrics ==
Slovene original

Žive naj vsi narodi
Ki hrepene dočakat' dan
Da koder sonce hodi
Prepir iz sveta bo pregnan

Da rojak
Prost bo vsak
Ne vrag, le sosed bo mejak!

Da rojak
Prost bo vsak
Ne vrag, le sosed bo
Ne vrag, le sosed bo mejak!

[ʒi.ʋe naj ʍsi nàː.ɾo.di]
[ki xɾɛ.pɛ.ne dɔ.t͡ʃàː.kad‿dáːn]
[dá kòː.dəɾ sóːn.t͡sɛ xo.di]
[pɾɛ.piɾ is sʋe.ta bóː pɾɛg.nàn ‖]

[dá ɾɔ.jàk]
[pɾɔ́zd‿bóː ʍsàk]
[nɛ́ ʋɾàk lɛ́ sɔ̀ː.sɛd‿bóː mɛ.jàːk ‖]

[dá ɾɔ.jàk]
[pɾɔ́zd‿bóː ʍsàk]
[nɛ́ ʋɾàk lɛ́ sɔ̀ː.sɛd‿bóː]
[nɛ́ ʋɾàg‿lɛ́ sɔ̀ː.sɛd‿bóː mɛ.jàːk ‖] (Note: See Help:IPA/Slovenian and Slovenian phonology.)

English translation
(Janko Lavrin, 1954)

God's blessing on all nations
Who long and work for that bright day
When o'er earth's habitations
No war, no strife shall hold its sway

Who long to see
That all men free
No more shall foes, but neighbours be!

Who long to see
That all men free
No more shall foes, but neighbours,
No more shall foes, but neighbours be!

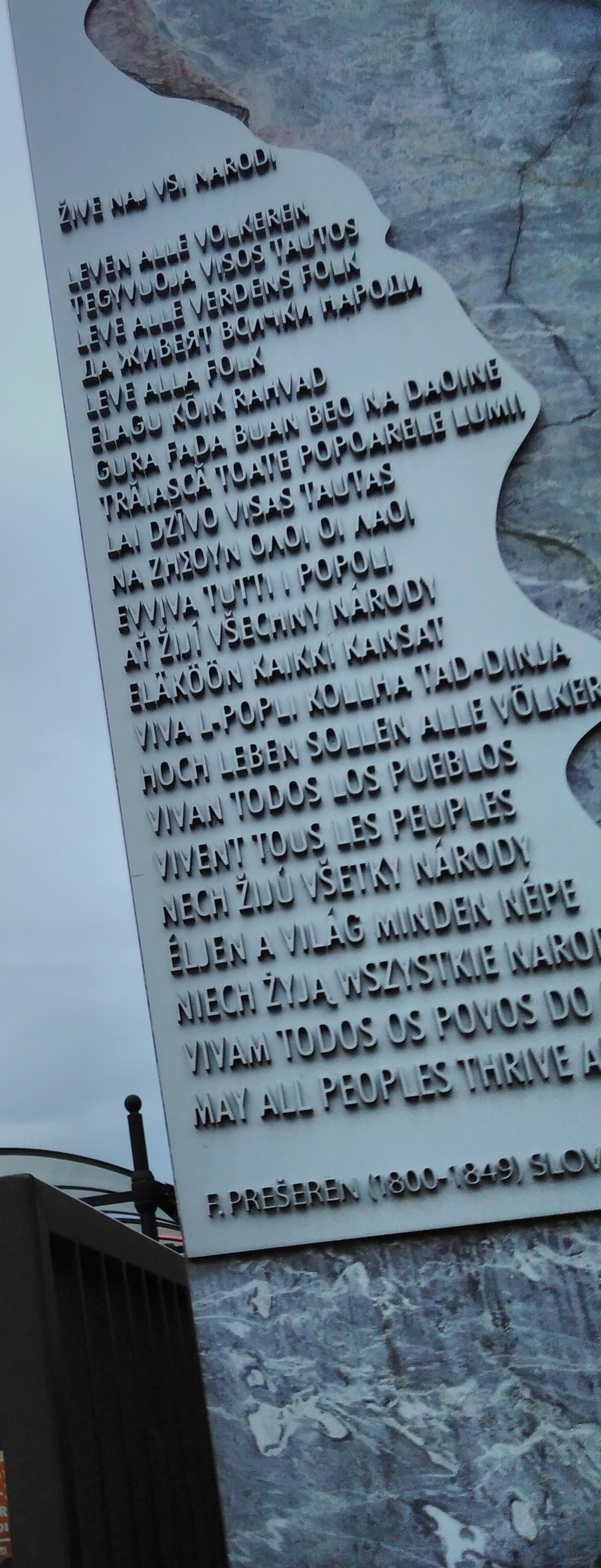
A sculpture with the first line of the 7th stanza of the poem, translated into various languages, near the Schuman roundabout, Brussels

== See also ==
- "Bilečanka"
- "Naprej, zastava slave"
