= Nanos (plateau) =

Mountain range

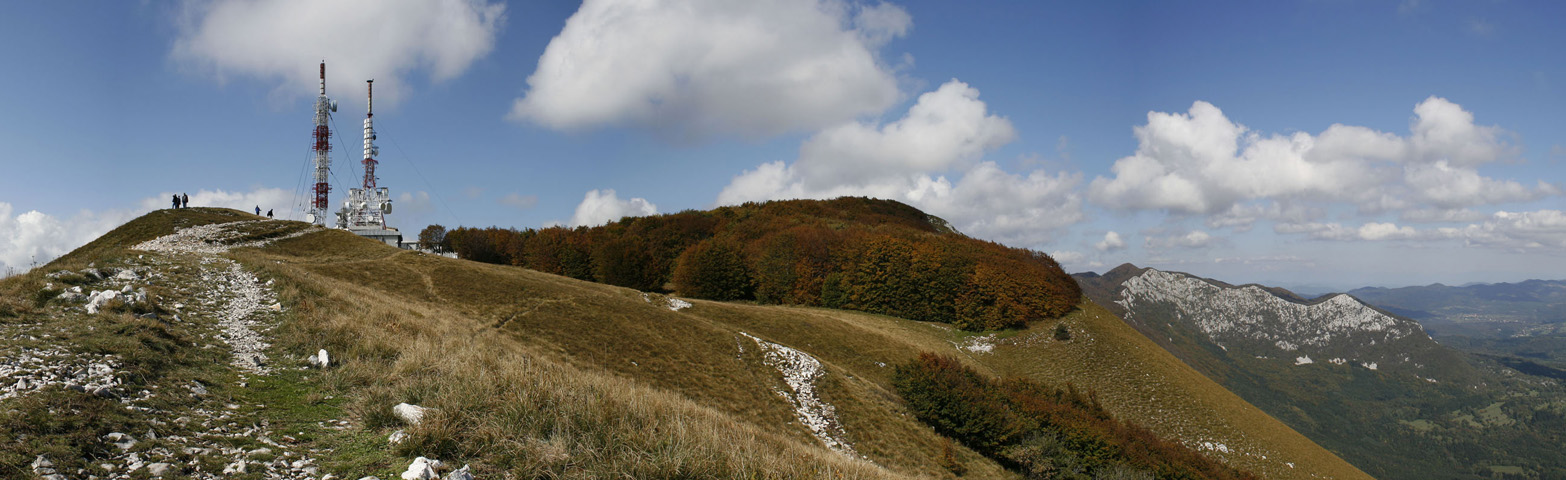
- Pleša Peak on the Nanos Plateau with the Nanos transmitter

Highest point
- Coordinates: 45°47′54.76″N 14°3′54.57″E

Geography
- Location within Slovenia
- Location: Inner Carniola, Slovenia
- Parent range: Dinaric Alps

Nanos (pronounced [ˈnaːnɔs]; Italian: Monte Re) is a karst limestone plateau at the eastern border of the Inner Carniola in southwestern Slovenia.

== Geography ==
The plateau is about 6 kilometres (3.7 mi) wide and 12 km (7.5 mi) long in the northern extension of the Dinaric Alps. The highest point of the plateau is Dry Peak (Slovene: Suhi vrh, 1,313 metres or 4,308 feet). The plateau is traversed by the Slovene Mountain Trail, the oldest interconnecting trail in Slovenia. The most popular destination on Nanos and part of the trail is Pleša Peak (1,262 metres or 4,140 feet) with the Vojko Lodge (Slovene: Vojkova koča, named for the Slovene Partisan Janko Premrl, a.k.a. Vojko) below its summit. In 1987, the southern and western slopes of Nanos were declared a regional park with an area of 2,632 hectares (6,500 acres).

== History ==
In Antiquity, Nanos was known as Ocra. Strabo reckoned it the last peak of the Alps. In the 1st century, the pass at Nanos was an important route for civilian and military traffic from Trieste (Tergeste) to Ljubljana (Emona) and beyond to Carnuntum at the Danube. It lost its importance when a faster road connected Emona to Aquileia further north in the 2nd century. Nanos is mentioned as Nanas in Johann Weikhard von Valvasor's 1689 work The Glory of the Duchy of Carniola.

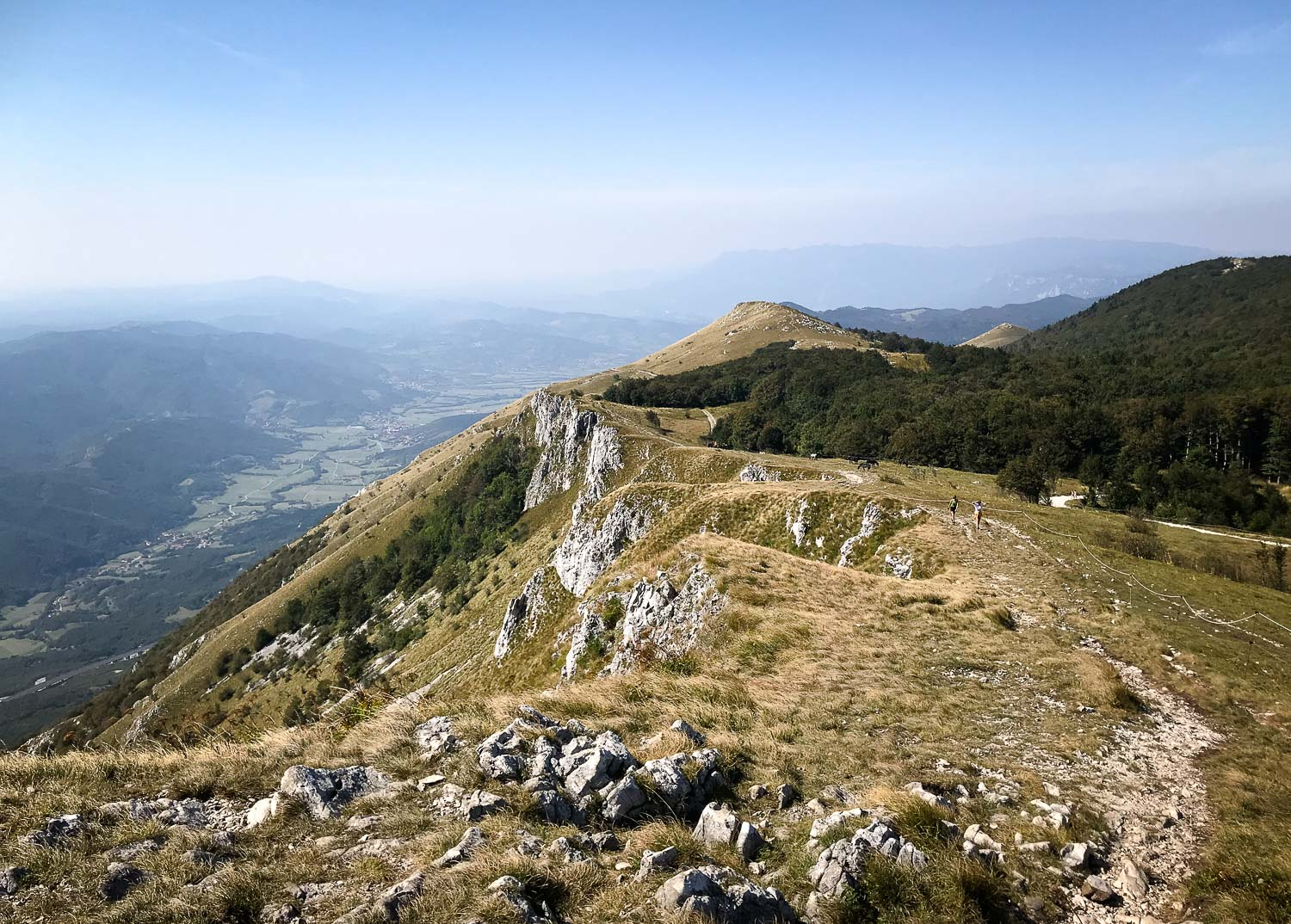
View west from Pleša Peak on Slovenia's Nanos Plateau

Nanos has an important symbolic place in the history and identity of Littoral Slovenes. In September 1927, the anti-Fascist insurgent organization TIGR was founded on the Nanos Plateau. On 18 April 1942, the Battle of Nanos took place at Nanos. It was one of the first battles between the Partisan insurgence in the Slovene Littoral, led by Janko Premrl, and the Italian Army, and was the beginning of the struggle for the western border between the two nations.

== Demographics and economy ==
There are around 35 residents domiciled on Nanos Plateau. They were finally connected to the electricity grid in 2006. Their most highly valued product is the Nanos cheese, produced already in the 16th century and, since October 2011, the protected designation of origin label. Today, it is made of cow milk, although before World War II, it was made of sheep milk. The number of sheep on the plateau dropped significantly since then. Residents also make a living from tourism.

== The Nanos transmitter ==
The Nanos transmitter is an FM/DAB/TV-broadcasting facility consisting of a 50 m guyed tower, a guyed mast, which may be a bit less tall, and a small guyed mast. The transmitter building has many dishes for radio relay links. The Nanos transmitter went into service in 1962 and played an important role in introducing PAL-standard color TV in the former Yugoslavia. The facility was attacked during the Slovene independence war in 1991. It is operated by the broadcaster RTV Slovenija.
