= Črni Vrh, Idrija =

Črni Vrh
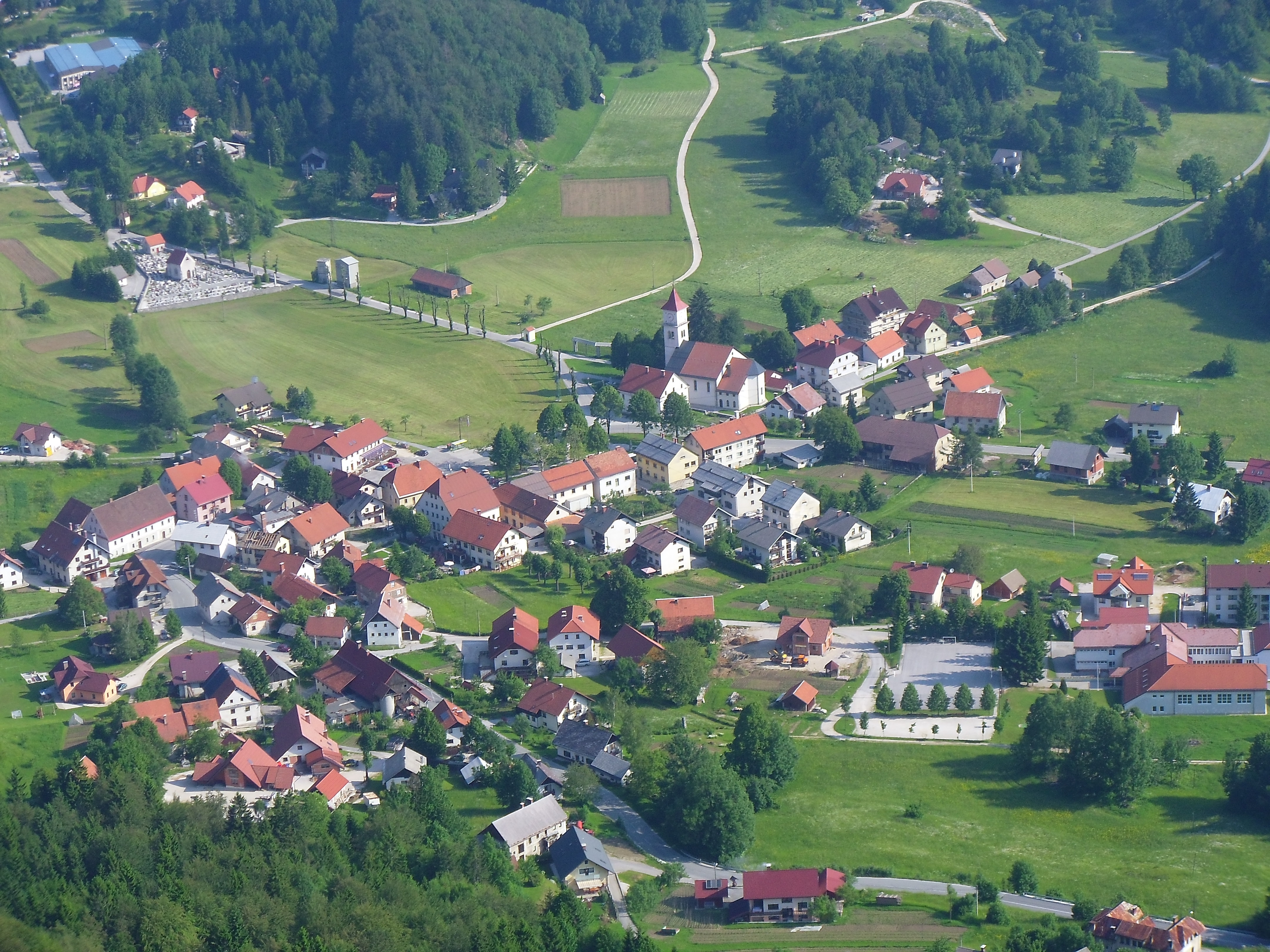

- Location in Slovenia
- Coordinates: 45°55′19.42″N 14°2′43.04″E
- Country: Slovenia
- Traditional region: Inner Carniola
- Statistical region: Gorizia
- Municipality: Idrija

Area
  - Total: 5.98 km^{2} (2.31 sq mi)
- Elevation: 734.4 m (2,409 ft)

Population (2002)
  - Total: 656 (Source: SURS 2013)

Črni Vrh (pronounced [ˈtʃəɾni ˈʋəɾx]; sometimes Črni Vrh nad Idrijo, German: Schwarzenberg) is a settlement in the hills south of Idrija in the traditional Inner Carniola region of Slovenia. It includes the hamlets of Zgornja Vas (Slovene: Zgornja vas), Spodnja Vas (Spodnja vas), Trate, Trebče, and Zidiše.

== Name ==
The name Črni Vrh literally means 'black pass' and was originally an oronym that was later transferred to the settlement. The epithet 'black' refers to dark, coniferous woods. The Slovene word vrh refers not only to a mountain peak, but may also refer to a saddle or mountain pass. This is the case with Črni Vrh, referring to the pass to the southwest that leads to Col and Ajdovščina.

== History ==
During the Second World War, a Slovene Home Guard post was established in Črni Vrh in August 1944. The post came under Partisan attack and was destroyed on September 1, 1944. The post commander, Lieutenant Jože Jakoš (1920–1944), and his second-in-command, Sergeant Tone Grum (1921–1944), were killed in the attack, along with the priest Rudolf Trček. Altogether, 47 Home Guard soldiers and six civilians were killed, and another 35 Home Guard soldiers were taken prisoner. The attack also resulted in the destruction and burning of a large part of the village.

== Church ==
The parish church in the settlement is dedicated to Saint Josse and belongs to the Diocese of Koper. The church dates from the 19th century and has a polygonal chancel walled on three sides, a wide rectangular nave, and a belltower. It is roofed with clay tiles. Original furnishings include the Baroque altar in the chancel. The church is located in the center of the village.

== Other cultural heritage ==
In addition to Saint Josse's church, other sites in Črni Vrh are registered as cultural heritage.

- The Zidiše archaeological site (Slovene: Arheološko območje Na Zidišah) is an unexcavated site. There was a fortified post at the site that formed part of an Alpine defense system in late antiquity.
- The house at Črni Vrh no. 1 dates from the second half of the 19th century. It is a two-story building with six bays, a gabled roof, and two door casings on the main facade. It stands east of the village, along the road to Predgriže.
- The house at Črni Vrh no. 47 stands in the center of the village. It is a prominent two-story house from the 19th century that shows the influence of townhouse architecture.
- The house and hayrack at Črni Vrh no. 23 are located in the hamlet of Trebče. The house is a two-story structure that was remodeled in 1924. It has four bays and a wooden door casing with a coffered door. A single straight-line hayrack stands next to the house.
- A chapel dedicated to the Holy Cross stands in the cemetery northwest of Črni Vrh. It was built in the 19th century in a neo-Gothic style. It has a polygonal chancel walled on three sides and a somewhat wider and higher rectangular nave. The outer walls feature buttresses.
- The Kampeljc Chapel-Shrine (Slovene: Kampeljcova kapelica) stands west of the settlement at Mountain Top Pass (prelaz Vrh Gore). It dates from the end of the 19th century and has the form of a miniature church. It has a portico with a belfry and a rectangular interior containing a statue of the Virgin Mary.
- The Kočar cross (Slovene: Kočarjev križ) is attached to the column of a hayrack at Črni Vrh no. 34. It is a wooden crucifix created by a self-taught wood carver from the Kučar farm at the end of the 19th century.
- A wooden crucifix on a stone base stands along the main road to Godovič, west of the farm at Črni Vrh no. 108. It is a typical example of 19th-century wood carving.
- The Plešnar Hayrack (Slovene: Plešnarjev kozolec) is a single straight-line hayrack dating from the 20th century. It has three masonry columns and two wooden ones, and is covered with asbestos-cement roofing. It stands on the north edge of the village along the road to Zadlog.
- The Plešnar Chapel-Shrine (Slovene: Plešnarjeva kapelica) stands on the north end of the village, along the road to Zalog. It dates from the 19th century. It has a low-pitched roof, a gable with a classical tympanum configuration, and a lancet entrance and side window.
- The Tinče Chapel-Shrine (Slovene: Tinčetova kapelica) was built at the end of the 19th century and is dedicated to the Virgin Mary. It has an apse, a steeply pitched metal roof, and a lancet entrance. It stands next to the cemetery northwest of the village.
- A wayside shrine in the shape of a crucifix stands in front of the house at Črni Vrh no. 53. It dates from 1897.
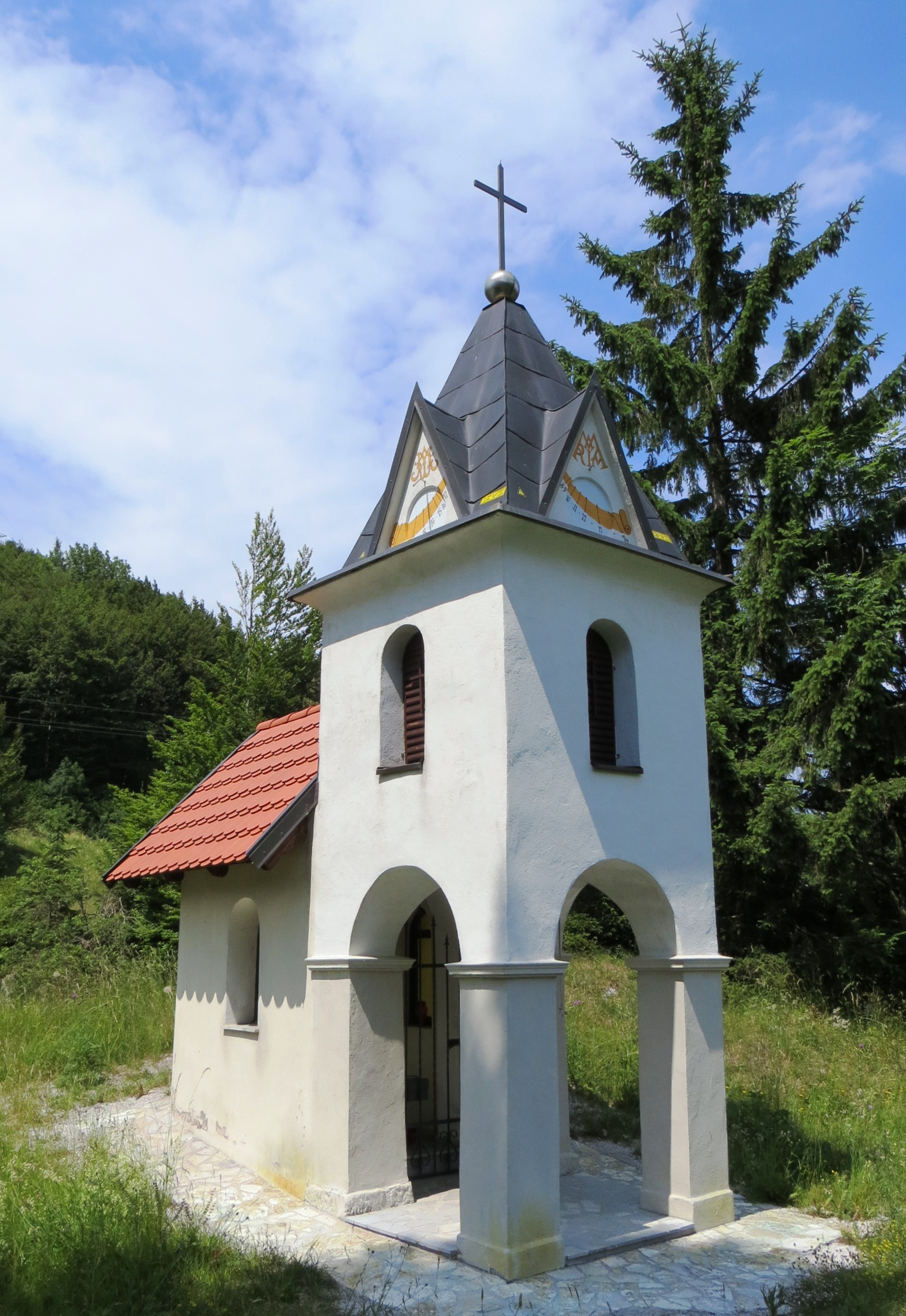
Kampeljc Chapel-Shrine

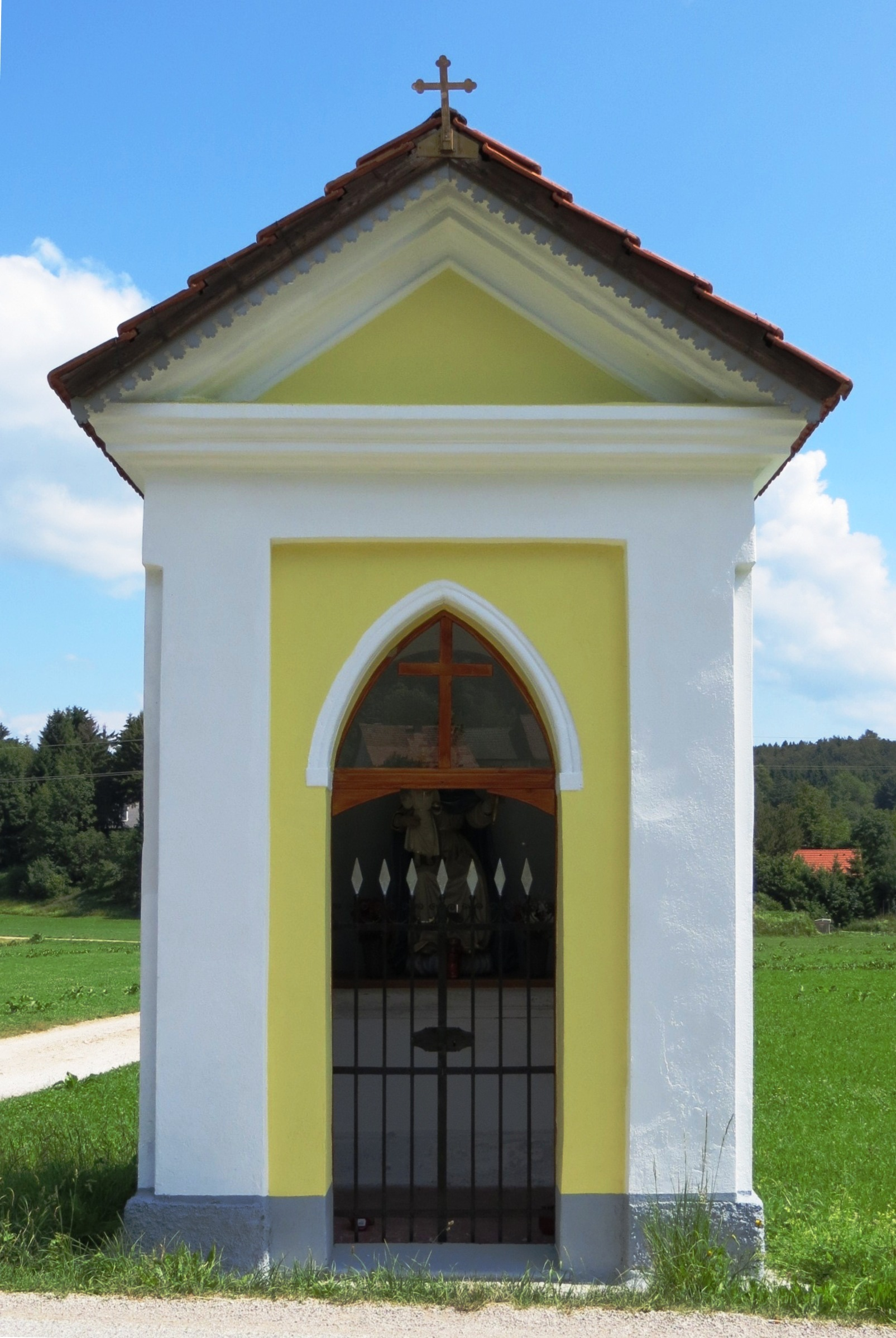
Plešnar Chapel-Shrine

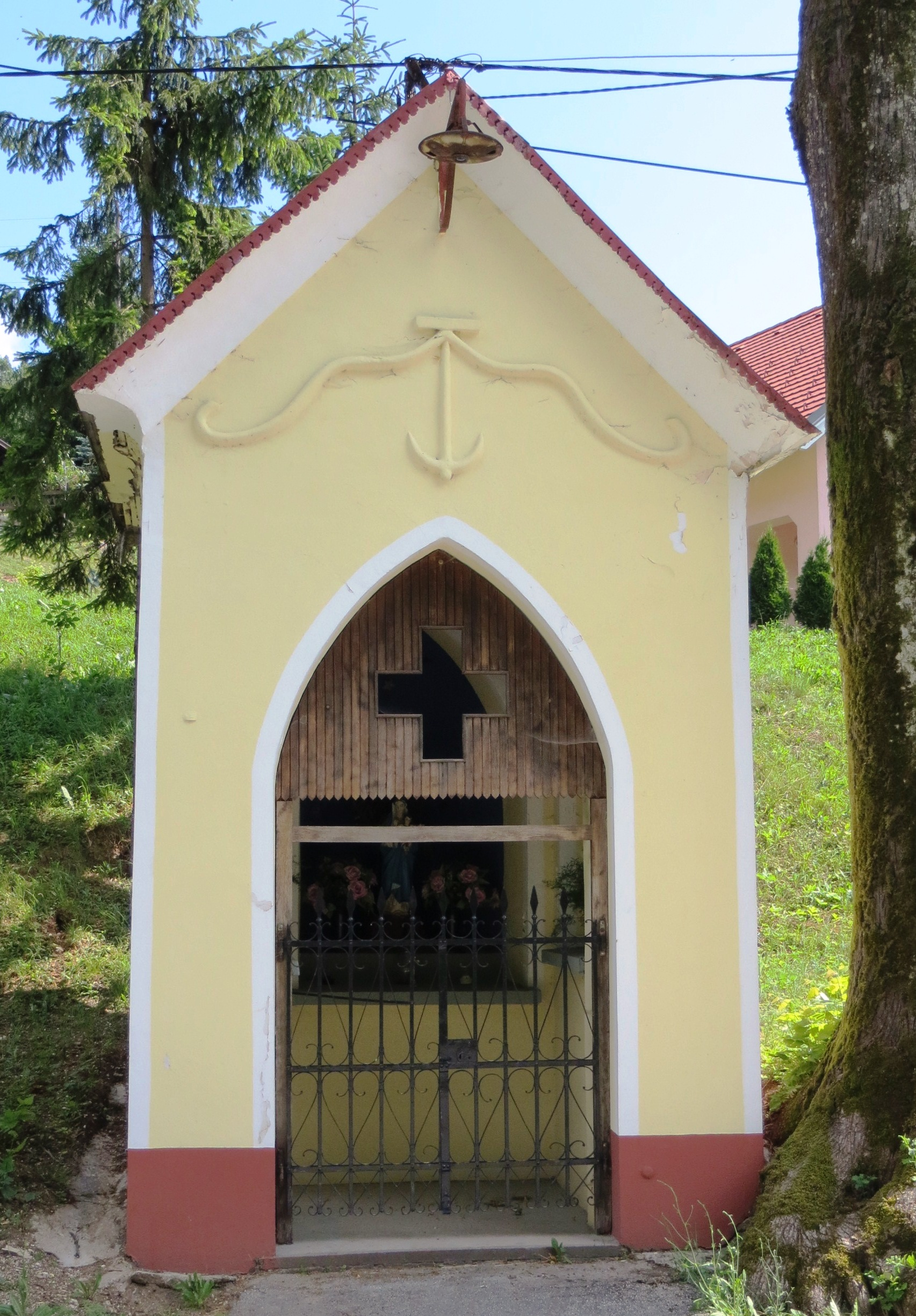
Tinče Chapel-Shrine

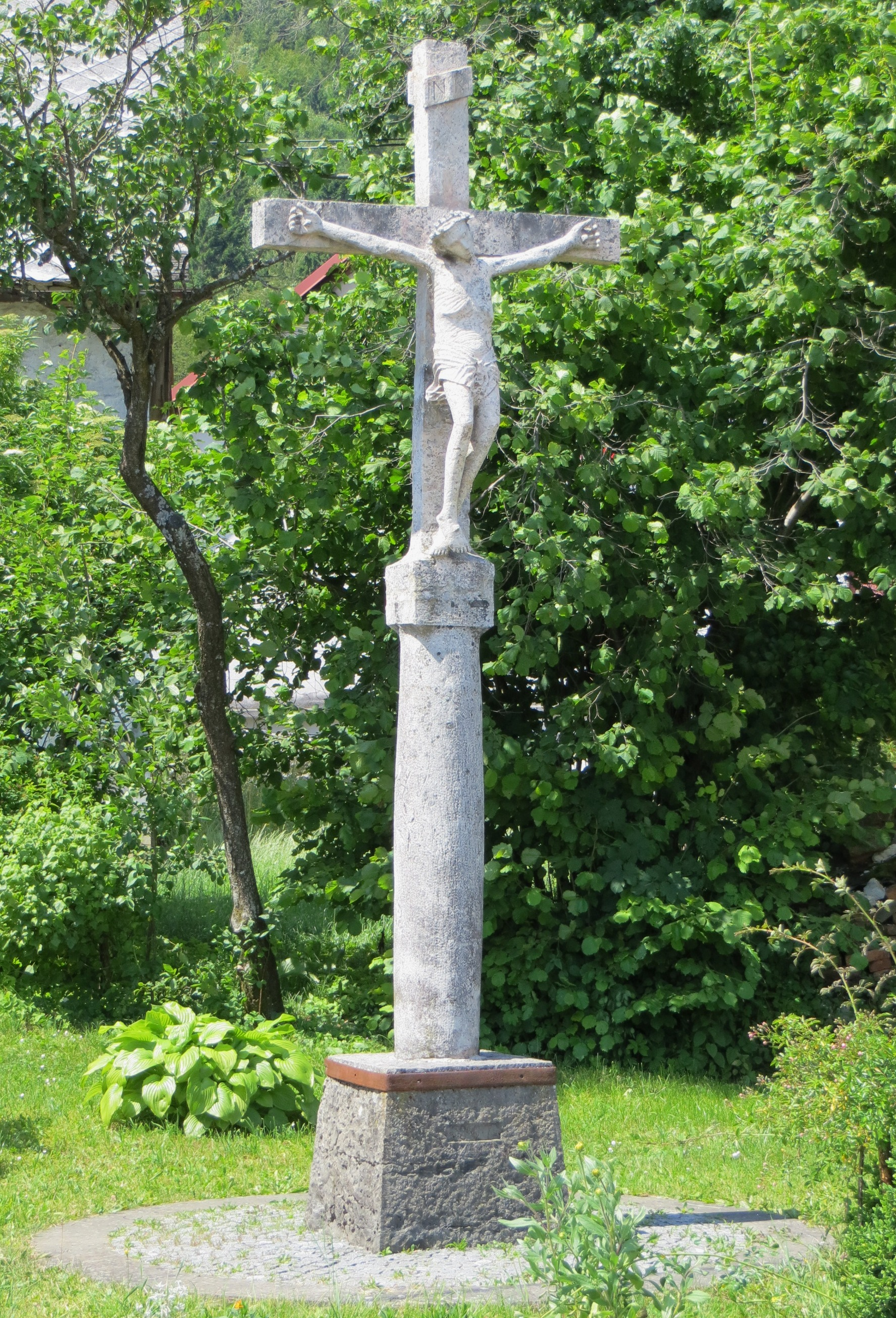
Crucifix wayside shrine

== Notable people ==
Notable people that were born or lived in Črni Vrh include:

- Martin Lamb (a.k.a. Lampe) (1670–1744), imperial advisor
- Matej Hladnik (1806–1865), writer
- Matija Ozbič (1828–1888), wood carver
- Fran Ksaver Tončič (1865–1919), sculptor
- Vladimir Miselj (1889–1944), diplomat and official of the League of Nations
