= Zdravljica =

1848 poem by France Prešeren

- by France Prešeren
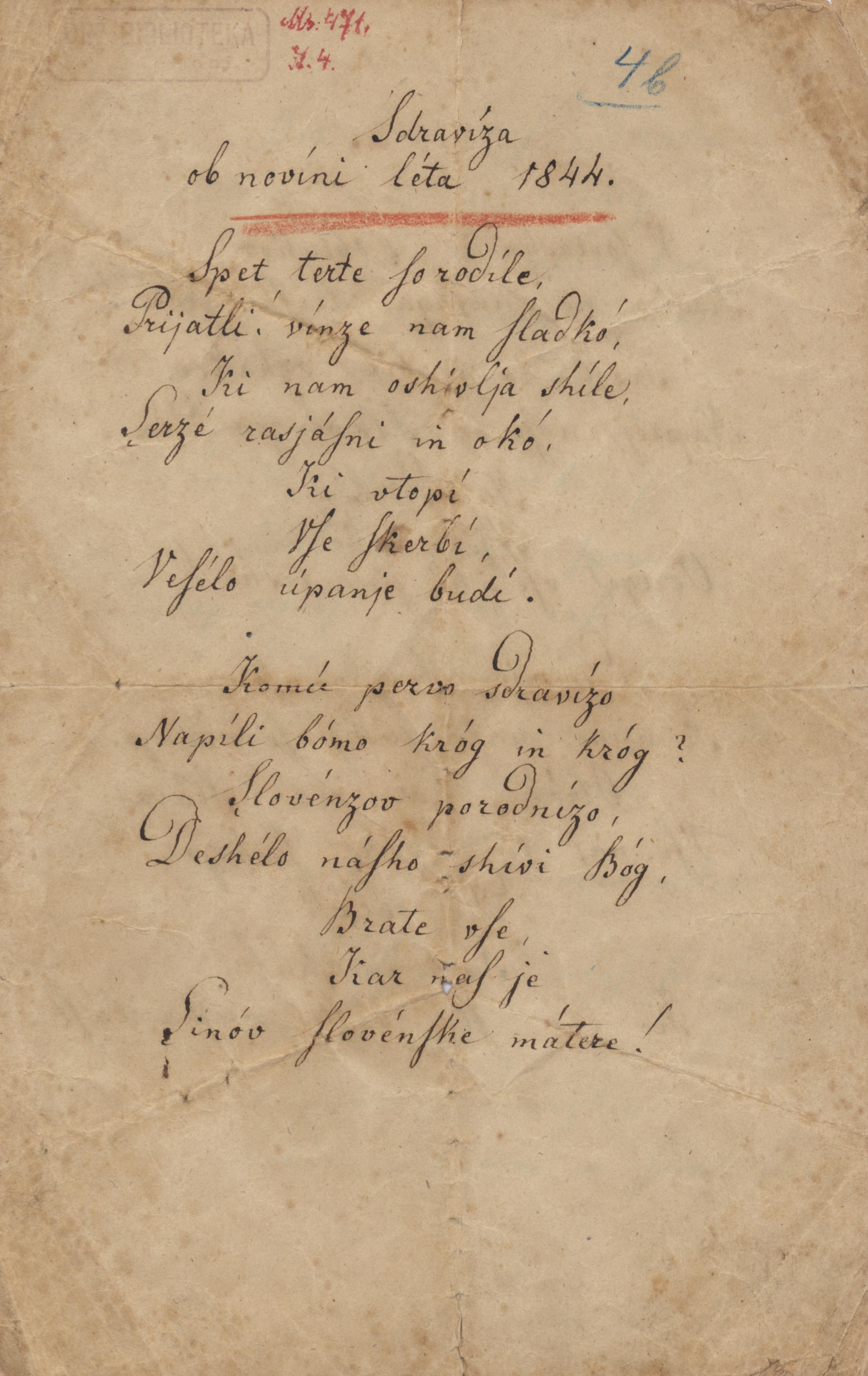
- Original manuscript of the poem, written in the Bohorič alphabet
- First published in: Kmetijske in rokodelske novice
- Country: Carniola, Kingdom of Illyria, Austrian Empire (present-day Slovenia)
- Language: Slovene
- Genre: carmen figuratum
- Publication date: 26 April 1848
- Media type: Print (periodical)

"Zdravljica" (Note: Also called Zdravica – from the toast expression "Na zdravje" (to health) in Slovene.) (Slovene pronunciation: [zdɾau̯ˈljiːtsa]; English: "A Toast") is a carmen figuratum poem by the 19th-century Romantic Slovene poet France Prešeren, inspired by the ideals of Liberté, égalité, fraternité. It was written in 1844 and published with some changes in 1848. Four years after it was written, Slovenes living within Habsburg Empire interpreted the poem in spirit of the 1848 March Revolution as political promotion of the idea of a united Slovenia. In it, the poet also declares his belief in a free-thinking Slovene and Slavic political awareness. In 1989, it was adopted as the regional anthem of Slovenia, becoming the national anthem upon independence in 1991. Zdravljica was awarded the European Heritage Label in 2020.

== History ==
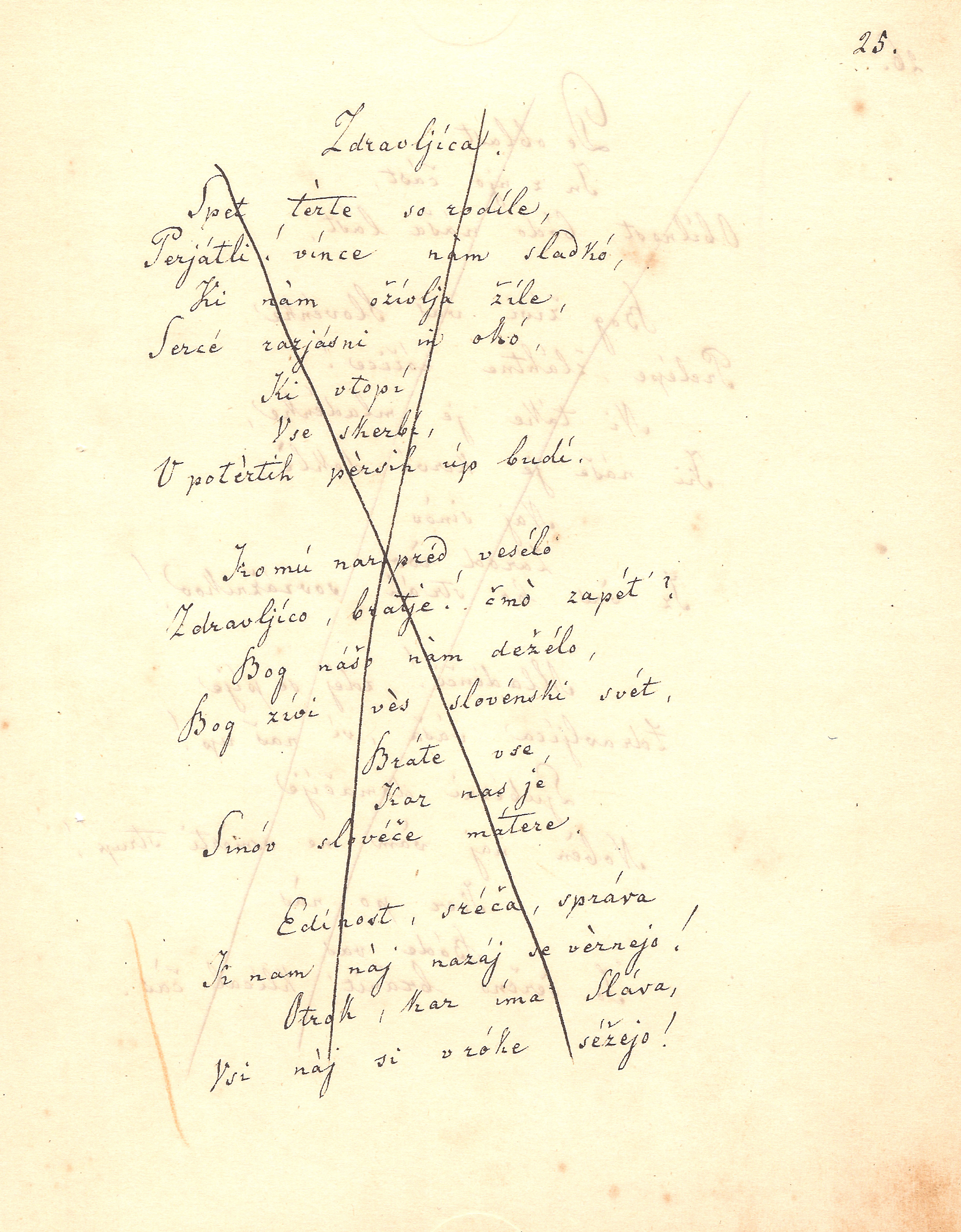
A censored manuscript, ready to be published in the collection Poezije (Poems) in 1846. A modified version was published in full in 1848.

The full version of the poem was first published only after the March Revolution, when Austrian censorship was abolished—censorship did not allow the poem to be printed earlier because of its political message. On 26 April 1848, it was published by the Slovene newspaper Kmetijske in rokodelske novice, which was edited by the Slovene conservative political leader Janez Bleiweis.

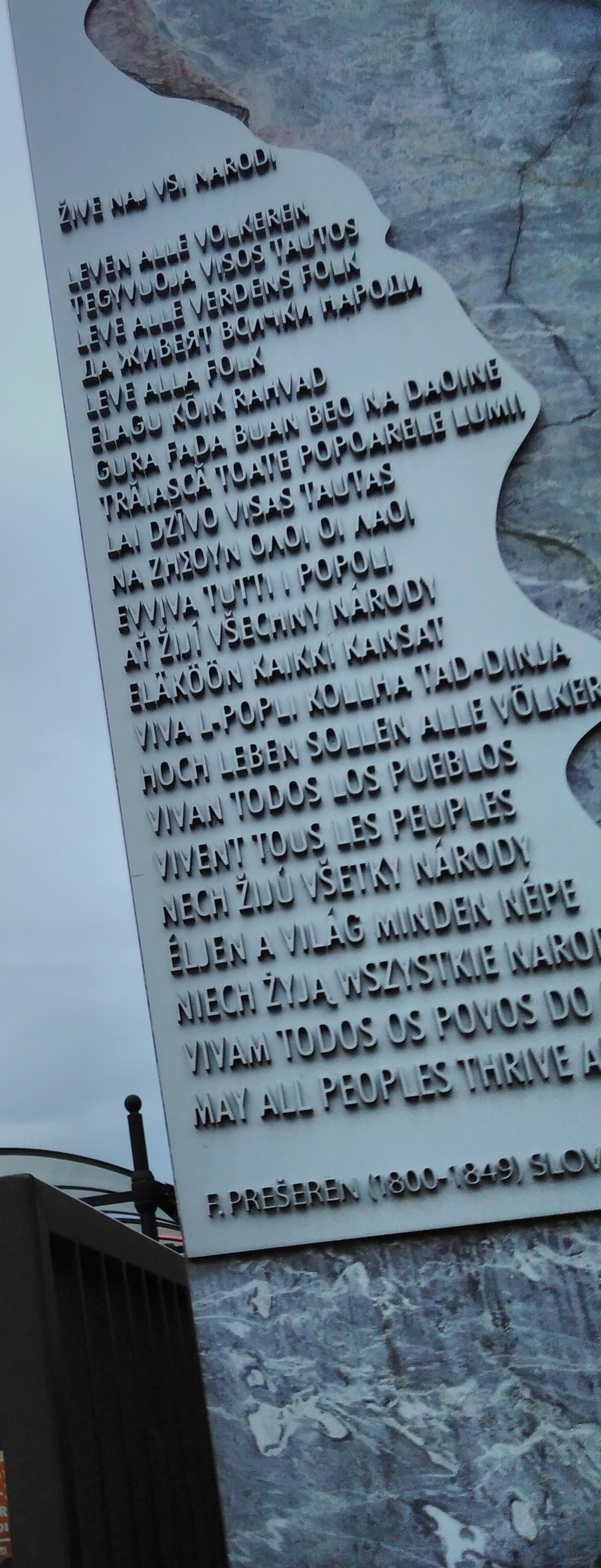
A memorial with "Žive naj vsi narodi", the first line of the 7th stanza of "Zdravljica", near the Robert Schuman Roundabout in Brussels

Before censorship was abolished, Prešeren omitted the third stanza ("V sovražnike 'z oblakov / rodú naj naš'ga treši gróm") because he intended to include the poem in his collection Poezije (Poems); however, the censor (fellow Slovene Franz Miklosich in Austrian service) saw in the fourth stanza ("Edinost, sreča, sprava / k nam naj nazaj se vrnejo") an expression of pan-Slavic sentiment and therefore did not allow its publication either. Prešeren believed the poem would be mutilated without both the third and fourth stanzas, and he decided not to include it in Poezije.

"Zdravljica" was first set to music in the 1860s by Benjamin Ipavec and Davorin Jenko, but their versions were not well received by the public, probably because the stanzas that they chose were not sufficiently nationally awakening. In 1905, the Slovene composer Stanko Premrl wrote a choral composition. It was first performed only on 18 November 1917 by the Music Society (Glasbena matica) in the Grand Hotel Union in Ljubljana. It became an immediate success.

"Zdravljica" has been translated into over 25 languages. It was translated into English by Janko Lavrin in 1954. Most translations of "Zdravljica" are fully protected by copyright, with the exception of a German translation by Klaus Detlef Olof that has been published on Wikisource under a free license.
