= Uyghur grammar =

Grammar of the Uyghur language

Uyghur is a Turkic language spoken mostly in the west of China.

Uyghur exhibits the agglutination characteristic to the Turkic family and its basic word order is subject-object-verb. It lacks grammatical gender and does not use articles. The language's inventory of 24 consonants and eight vowels features both vowel harmony and consonant harmony. Nouns are marked for ten cases, in general with suffixes and are additionally inflected for number.

This article uses both the Arabic script (official for the language) and Latin script for Uyghur words.

== General characteristics ==
The typical word order in Uyghur is subject–object–verb, as in the sentence "men uyghurche oquymen", lit., "I Uyghur study" Compare this to English, where the sentence would be expressed with subject–verb–object order: "I study Uyghur".

Uyghur is an agglutinative language, meaning that potentially many suffixes (denoting person, number, case, mood, etc.) are usually all attached to one word stem. For example "to your house," the main word, house, occurs first, and the modifying elements are attached directly to the right and written all in one word:

ئۆيىڭىزگە
öy-ingiz-ge
home-2sg.POSS-DAT
"to your home"

ئىشلەۋاتقان
ishle-wat-qan
work-CONT-INDEF.PAST
"having worked"

Nouns are not distinguished for gender (e.g. male, female), unlike in such languages as French, Spanish and German. Nouns are usually pluralized (with the suffix +lAr) except when preceded by a numeral: compare "atlar" ("horses") and "ikki at" (two horses). Instead of using articles (like English "a", "the"), Uyghur uses demonstrative pronouns ("this", "that") and no marker or the numeral one (bir) to indicate definiteness and indefiniteness, respectively, "this cat/the cat" vs. بىر مۈشۈك(bir müshük) "a/one cat" or مۈشۈك(müshük) "cat/cats."

Uyghur verbs take, usually at least for tense (present, past) and person (I, you, s/he, they, etc.), for example

ئوقۇيمەن
oqu-y-men
read-PRES.FUT-1sg
"I read/study."

Uyghur verbs can also take other suffixes to mark voice (causative, passive), aspect (continuous), mood (e.g. ability), as well as suffixes that change verbs into nouns—sometimes many all together:

ئوقۇۋاتقانىمدا
oqu-wat-qan-im-da
read-CONT-PCP.PST-POSS.1sg-LOC
"When I was studying"

Negation usually also appears as a verb suffix, e.g.

ئوقۇمايمەن
oqu-ma-y-men
read-NEG-PRES.FUT-1sg
"I don't read."

Uyghur has vowel and consonant harmony, a system where vowels or consonants in a word come to match or become similar to each other, especially as suffixes and other elements are attached. Many but not all words and grammatical elements in Uyghur behave according to these harmonic principles. If a suffix is written with one or more capital letters (e.g. +DA, +lAr, +GA, etc.), these capital letters indicate that these sounds are harmonic, that is, variable: D= d/t, G= gh/q/g/k; K= k/q; A= a/e; I= i/u/ü or ø/i/u/ü.

== Sound system ==
There are 32 basic sounds in Modern Uyghur.

=== Consonants ===
Uyghur has 24 consonants (listed here according to the Arabic-script alphabet): b, p, t, j, ch, x, d, r, z, zh, s, sh, gh, f, q, k, g, ng, l, m, n, x, h, w, y (and 25 consonants if the glottal stop ‘ is counted). Most are not pronounced much differently than their English counterparts (e.g. Uyghur j in baj "tax" is pronounced like j in judge; Uyghur ch in üch "three" is pronounced like ch in itch; Uyghur h in he’e "yes" is pronounced like h in hello), except that l has palatal or velar variants. A few sounds are not found in English: q gh and x. The voiceless uvular stop q [q] is pronounced like a back k, with the back of the tongue touching the soft palate, as in aq "white," Qeshqer "Kashgar." The sound gh [ʁ] ~ [ɣ] is typically a voiced fricative version of q, also pronounced at the very back of the mouth and sounds like French or German r, as in Roissy or Ruhr. (Near front vowels, gh is often pronounced more front, like French Rue or German Rübe.) Finally, the Uyghur voiceless velar or uvular fricative x [x] ~ [χ] is pronounced like ch in Scottish loch, or further back in the mouth, like a back version of German ach.

The four sounds k, g, q and gh are subject to consonant harmony: (1) within a stem (main word), they potentially determine its backness and (2) within a variable suffix, they conform to the backness and voicing of the preceding stem. Consonant harmony is discussed below.

The ژ zh [ʒ] (sounds like English garage), is only for foreign and onomatopoeic words like zhurnal ‘magazine, journal’ and pizh-pizh "sizzling." The letter ج j (normally pronounced [dʒ] as in baj ‘tax’) is in southern Xinjiang often pronounced [ʒ]. Initial y [j] can also be pronounced [ʒ] before i, e.g. yilan [ʒilan] ‘snake’.

In Uyghur words of Turkic origin, sh is rare, except as a suffix; similarly, since f was borrowed into Uyghur from Arabic and Persian, it is often replaced by p, especially in colloquial and rural usage: fakultët~pakultët ‘academic department’.

=== Vowels ===
Uyghur has eight vowels. Vowels are rounded (o, u, ü, ö) and unrounded (a, i, e, ë); this distinction is sometimes termed labial vs. non-labial; they are front (ü, ö, e, ë) or back (u, o, a). These distinctions are critical for harmonic purposes, since Uyghur words are subject to vowel harmony. The orthographic vowel i represents both a front [i] and a back [ɨ] and is not subject to vowel harmony.

=== Stress ===
Uyghur accent (stress or high pitch, which this article will for convenience call stress) is not well understood, yet some general remarks can be made to aid language learning. In Uyghur, stress is mostly determined by the length of syllables. This means that a syllable which is closed (i.e., ends in consonants [CVC or CVCC]) tends to attract stress, while a syllable which is open (i.e. ends in a vowel [CV]) does not. A rule of thumb is: stress the last syllable of the stem, e.g. ayagh "foot," Turpan'gha "to Turfan."

Words without closed syllables are likely to have the final syllable stressed.

Certain suffixes attract and repel stress.

Attract stress: -GAn, -Gu, (A)m, -(I)wat.

Repel stress (to the preceding vowel): -(I)wer.

=== Harmonic Rules ===
Word-internal harmony is relatively weak in Uyghur, but when suffixes are added to a word stem, certain suffix vowels and consonants harmonize with those of the stem. There are three variable vowels in Uyghur, A (a/e), I (i/u/ü), and U (u/ü). There are three harmonically variable consonant types: G (k/g/q/gh), K (k/q) and D (d/t). Uyghur's harmony system has three relevant components: voicing, backness and roundness harmony. Note that -AK will always be either -ek or -aq, and -IK can only be ik, iq, uq, or ük.

Archiphoneme table
Preceding vowel	A	I	U	G
ö	e	ü	ü	k/g
ü	e	ü	ü	k/g
e	e	i	u	k/g
ë	e	i	u	k/g
i	e	i	u	k/g
i	a	i	u	q/gh
a	a	i	u	q/gh
o	a	u	u	q/gh
u	a	u	u	q/gh

Remember that i represents both a front [i] and a back [ɨ], and is a neutral vowel and thus this can affect vowel harmony in suffixes. For instance:

ئىشىككە
ishik-ke
door-DAT
"to the door"

Takes the front versions of archiphonemes G and A, as the word is solely made up of [i]s, but:

كاتىپقا
katip-qa
secretary-DAT
"to the secretary"

Takes the back versions, as the word is phonetically [kɑtɨpqɑ], with the /i/ turning to the back vowel [ɨ], due to the /ɑ/.

=== A-raising ===
When a stem ends in unstressed a or e (as part of the archiphoneme A), and it is followed by a consonant-initial suffix that contains a vowel, this a/e is usually raised to i. When a monosyllabic stem ends in a/e, and is followed by a consonant, its a/e is usually raised to ë. This is reflected in the orthography. Other vowels do not change.

For example:

چوكا، چوكىلار
choka, choki-lar
chopstick, chopsticks

Here the -a of /ˈtʃo.kɑ/ is raised to /i/ to make the plural, /ˈtʃo.ki.lɑr/.

ئاكا، ئاكام
a.k.a. aka-m
brother, brother.POSS-1sg

As the suffix here, -m, does not have a vowel, the final a is not raised. Here is an example of a monosyllabic stem changingː

ماڭ، مېڭىۋاتىدۇ
mang, mëng-iwat-idu
walk, walk-CONT-3sg
walk, s/he is walking

While the stem /mɑŋ/ is not an open syllable, as Uyghur syllable structure is onset-mandatory, when the stem takes the suffix -(I)wat- the /ŋ/ of the stem breaks off to form a syllable with the /i/ of the suffix, like soː /me.ŋi.wɑ.ti.du/ (here the [me] is not stressed). Where the a or e is stressed, the vowel does not raise, for instance with:

ئاۋاز، ئاۋازىم
awaz, awazim
voice, voice-POSS.1sg
voice, my voice

As the syllable is stressed, it does not raise: /ʔɑ.ˈwɑz/, /ʔɑ.ˈwɑ.zim/. Words like this with a stressed final syllable are known as strong nouns and add a y or r between their stem and first/second person personal suffixes. Monosyllabic words ending in a rounded verb always add y.

Names, unfamiliar place names, and non-nativised loan words do not change. Loan words are frequent sources of stressed open final syllables, such as the Arabic loan /dun.ˈjɑ/, from Arabic: دُنْيَا, romanized: dunyā.

=== Sound changes not reflected in writing ===
A-raising also takes place across word boundaries, but this is not reflected in writing, see:

لاتا خەج
lata xej
cloth shoe

Which is pronounced /ˈlɑ.ti xɛdʒ/.

Some loan words ending in p and b change that p/b to w when a vowel-initial suffix is added to them. This is not reflected in any orthography other than Cyrillic.

The table below shows some other sound changes in words that are not reflected in writing.

Orthographic	Pronounced	Notes
-nb-	mb	
-lm-	mm	
-ln-	ll	
-ts-	ss	
-zs-	ss	
-ghq-	qq	when the dative -GA is attached to a stem ending in -gh it is orthographically written as -ghqA and pronounced as -qqa
-gh	q	only word-final
-q	x	only in some words
VkV	g	
VqV	gh	
ch(t/k)	sh	
-b	p	only word-final
Vr(C/.)	/Vː/	this lengthens the preceding vowel
i(t/k)	/ɪ̥ʃ/(t/k)	
ë in the initial syllable	i	
o in a syllable before u	u	
ö in a syllable before ü	ü	

== Pronouns ==
=== Personal pronouns ===
In Uyghur there is one set of personal pronouns used for the first- and third person, while there are three in the second person. The use of the three sets in the second person depends on the formality and politeness.

The personal pronouns are inflected for number and case. Follow the links of each of the personal pronouns to see them inflected.

		Singular	Plural
First person		**مەن** men	**بىز** biz
Second person	Informal	**سەن** sen	**سەنلەر** senler
Second person	Polite	**سىز** siz	**سىلەر** siler
Second person	Respectful	**سىلى** sili	-
Third person		**ئۇ** u	**ئۇلار** ular

The second person personal pronoun mostly used among people is the polite سىز, siz, while the informal سەن, sen is used between very close friends or when parents are addressing their children. The informal سەن, sen is also used when the speaker has a higher social rank than the addressed person.

The respectful سىلى, sili is used for respectfully addressing elders, grandparents or other notable persons of a community. Royalty is also addressed using سىلى, sili and sometimes even customers in stores.

The declension of the pronouns is outlined in the following chart, with some exhibiting irregularities (in bold):

Number	Singular					Plural		
Person	1st	2nd			3rd	1st	2nd	3rd
Person	1st	Inf.	Polite	Resp.	3rd	1st	Polite	3rd
nominative	**مەن** men	**سەن** sen	**سىز** siz	**سىلى** sili	**ئۇ** u	**بىز** biz	**سىلەر** siler	**ئۇلار** ular
genitive	**مېنىڭ** **mëning**	**سېنىڭ** **sëning**	**سىزنىڭ** sizning	**سىلىنىڭ** silining	**ئۇنىڭ** uning	**بىزنىڭ** bizning	**سىلەرنىڭ** silerning	**ئۇلارنىڭ** ularning
dative	**ماڭا** **ma'nga**	**ساڭا** **sa'nga**	**سىزگە** sizge	**سىلىگە** silige	**ئۇنىڭغا** **uninggha**	**بىزگە** bizge	**سىلەرگە** silerge	**ئۇلارغا** ulargha
accusative	**مېنى** **mëni**	**سېنى** **sëni**	**سىزنى** sizni	**سىلىنى** silini	**ئۇنى** uni	**بىزنى** bizni	**سىلەرنى** silerni	**ئۇلارنى** ularni
locative	**مەندە** mende	**سەندە** sende	**سىزدە** sizde	**سىلىدە** silide	**ئۇنىڭدا** **uningda**	**بىزدە** bizde	**سىلەردە** silerde	**ئۇلاردا** ularda
ablative	**مەندىن** mendin	**سەندىن** sendin	**سىزدىن** sizdin	**سىلىدىن** silidin	**ئۇنڭندىن** **uningdin**	**بىزدىن** bizdin	**سىلەردىن** silerdin	**ئۇلاردىن** ulardin
locative- qualitative	**مەندىكى** mendiki	**سەندىكى** sendiki	**سىزدىكى** sizdiki	**سىلىدىكى** silidiki	**ئۇنىڭدىكى** **uningdiki**	**بىزدىكى** bizdiki	**سىلەردىكى** silerdiki	**ئۇلاردىكى** ulardiki
limitative	**مەنگىچە** men'giche	**سەنگىچە** sen'giche	**سىزگىچە** sizgiche	**سىلىگىچە** siligiche	**ئۇنىڭگىچە** **uninggiche**	**بىزگىچە** bizgiche	**سىلەرگىچە** silergiche	**ئۇلارگىچە** ulargiche
similitude	**مەندەك** mendek	**سەندەك** sendek	**سىزدەك** sizdek	**سىلىدەك** silidek	**ئۇنىڭداك** **uningdak**	**بىزدەك** bizdek	**سىلەردەك** silerdek	**ئۇلاردەك** ulardek
equivalence	**مەنچىلىك** menchilik	**سەنچىلىك** senchilik	**سىزچىلىك** sizchilik	**سىلىچىلىك** silichilik	**ئۇنىڭچىلىك** **uningchilik**	**بىزچىلىك** bizchilik	**سىلەرچىلىك** silerchilik	**ئۇلارچىلىك** ularchilik

=== Demonstrative pronouns ===
Uyghur has several demonstrative pronouns with some of them being used for emphasis or as intensifiers, while others have less specific uses. Common for all of the demonstrative pronouns is that their use depends on the distance between the speaker and the thing or person to which is referred.

The demonstrative pronouns are inflected for number and case, but must take the genitive case suffix -ning first before other cases (other than in the genitive and accusative case). In the table below, the demonstrative pronouns can be seen, although only in the singular. Follow the links of each of the demonstrative pronouns to see them inflected.

Meaning	Form			
Meaning	Basic	Specific	Familiar	Exact Location
this	**بۇ** bu	**ماۋۇ** mawu (Note: /b/ becomes /m/ here.) (Note: The suffix ۋۇ -wu is often omitted in everyday speech.)	**مۇشۇ** mushu	**مەشە** meshe
that	**ئۇ** u	**ئاۋۇ** awu (Note: /u/ becomes /a/ here.)	**ئاشۇ** ashu	**ئەشە** eshe
that (distant)	**شۇ** shu	**ئەشۇ** eshu	–	–

The most common demonstrative pronouns are بۇ, bu, ئۇ, u and شۇ, shu, the first being translated as this and the remaining two as that. The first is used when referring to an object or person which is visible and close to the speaker, the second is used when referring to an object or person which is away from the speaker and the third is used when referring to a previously mentioned object or person which is not particular close to the speaker in an affirmative statement.

The two first-mentioned demonstrative persons each have an intensified derived form ending in ۋۇ, -wu, ماۋۇ, mawu and ئاۋۇ, awu, respectively. These are used when it is necessary to make it clear that the object or person the demonstrative pronoun is referring to really is the object or person which the speaker means. The two first-mentioned demonstrative persons both also have another derived form, ending in شۇ, -shu, مۇشۇ, mushu and ئاشۇ, ashu, respectively. These are often used for confirming something the speaker is already familiar with.

The examples below illustrate the use of بۇ, bu and its derived forms.

بۇ قەلەم
bu qelem
"This pen"

ماۋۇ قەلەم
mawu qelem
"This pen (and not any other pen)"

مۇشۇ قەلەم
mushu qelem
"This pen (which you are familiar with)"

=== Interrogative Pronouns ===
These are divided into four categories based on the part of speech they represent. They are the most regular of the pronouns.

==== Noun Interrogative Pronouns ====
These pronouns work like nouns, and take number and case suffixes. Ne, nëme, and qeyer also take personal possessive suffixes.

نېمىدىن قورقىسىز؟
nëmi-din qorq-isiz?
what-ABL fear-PRES.2PL
What are you afraid of?

نەرىڭ ئاغرىدۇ؟
ner-ing aghr-idu?
where-POSS.2SG hurt-PRES.3SG
Where hurts? What part of you hurts?

Uyghur	English	Notes
**كىم** kim	who	does not take possessives
**نە** ne	where (classical: what)	same as qeyer when inflecting according to possessive suffixes, r is added
**نېمە** nëme	what	
**نە ۋاق(ىت)** ne waq(it)	when, what time	
**نە كەم** ne kem	when, what time	same as ne waq
**قەيەر** qeyer	where	used with the locative
**قاياق** qayaq	where from/to	used with the dative or ablative does not take possessives

==== Adjective Interrogative Pronouns ====
These pronouns directly depend on nouns and function as qualifiers.

Uyghur	English	Notes
**قانداق** qandaq	what kind, how	
**قايسى** qaysi	which	
**نېمانداق** nëmandaq	why... to what a degree (so many etc)	

==== Numeral Interrogative Pronouns ====
These concern questions related to numeral quantities. They can take the place of measure words and have number suffixes attached to them to clarify their meaning further.

قانچە ئادەم كەلدى؟
qanche adem kel-di?
how.many person come-PST.3pl
How many people came?

قانچەيلەن كەلدى؟
qanche-ylen kel-di?
how.many-person.suffix come-PST.3PL
How many people came?

Uyghur	English	Notes
**قانچە** qanche	how many (quantity)	
**قانچىلىك** qanchilik	how many (quantity)	

==== Adverb Interrogative Pronouns ====
These act like adverbs in the sentence, and cannot take case suffixes or postpositions, other than qachaq.

Uyghur	English	Notes
**قاچاق** qachaq	when	
**قانداقسىگە** qandaqsige	on what basis how (rhetorical)	
**نېچۈك** nëchük	why (literary)	
**قانداقلارچە** qandaqlarche	however, how	
**نېمانچە** nëmanche	why... to what a degree (so many etc)	
**نېمىدېگەن** nëmidëken	exclamatory intensifier	
**نە قەدەر** ne qeder	exclamatory intensifier	
**نە قاتارلىك** ne qatarlik	exclamatory intensifier	

==== Special Interrogative Pronouns ====
Uyghur	English	Notes
**نېمىسى** nëmisi	what part	
**قېنى** qëni	where (is)	functions only as a predicate

== Nouns ==
Nouns in Uyghur have no grammatical gender or definite marking, although the number 'one' bir can be used to mark indefiniteness. Plurals are marked by -lAr, with the vowel following the rules of vowel harmony. The plural is not used after numbers.

=== Cases ===
Uyghur has ten cases, all of which except the nominative are marked by suffixation after possible plural or possessive suffixes. Case always comes after plurals and possessive suffixes. Note that the locative-qualitative, limitative, equivalence, and similitude cases are sometimes not considered to be cases.

Declensions of nouns for cases
Case	Suffix	kün "day" +V+F	hawa "air" +V-F	chëlek "bucket" -V+F	kitab "book" -V-F
nominative	-∅	كۈن kün	ھاۋا hawa	چېلەك chëlek	كىتاب kitab
genitive	-ning	كۈننىڭ künning	ھاۋىنىڭ hawining	چېلەكنىڭ chëlekning	كىتابنىڭ kitabning
dative	-GA (ge, gha, ke, qa)	كۈنگە kün'ge	ھاۋىغا hawigha	چېلەككە chëlekke	كىتابقا kitabqa
accusative	-ni	كۈننى künni	ھاۋىنى hawini	چېلەكنى chëlekni	كىتابنى kitabni
locative	-DA (de, da, te, ta)	كۈندە künde	ھاۋىدا hawida	چېلەكتە chëlekte	كىتابتا kitabta
ablative	-Din (din, tin)	كۈندىن kündin	ھاۋىدىن hawidin	چېلەكتىن chëlektin	كىتابتىن kitabtin
locative- qualitative	-Diki (diki, tiki)	كۈندىكى kündiki	ھاۋىدىكى hawidiki	چېلەكتىكى chëlektiki	كىتابتىكى kitabtiki
limitative	-Giche (giche, ghiche, kiche, qiche)	كۈنگىچە kün'giche	ھاۋىغىچە hawighiche	چېلەككىچە chëlekkiche	كىتابقىچە kitabqiche
similitude	-Dek (dek, tek)	كۈندەك kündek	ھاۋىدەك hawidek	چېلەكتەك chëlektek	كىتابتەك kitabtek
equivalence	-che/chilik	كۈنچىلىك künchilik	ھاۋىچىلىك hawichilik	چېلەكچىلىك chëlekchilik	كىتابچىلىك kitabchilik

Note that as the example word, كىتاب/kitab, has its final consonant devoiced to phonetically be /kiˈtɑp/, it uses the unvoiced variants of suffixes.

==== Nominative ====
The nominative indicates the subject; that which is predicated in the sentence. It can also indicate the target of address, and names for qualified objects. For example:

ئۇيغۇر ئوقۇغۇچى
uyghur oqughuchi
Uyghur:NOM student
a Uyghur student

It can also function as a predicate, for example:

مەن ئوقۇغۇچى
men oqughuchi
1sg student:NOM
I am a student

==== Genitive ====
The genitive indicates the thing that possesses, and is primarily a qualifier but can function as a predicate, for example:

بۇ لۇغەت ئەھمەدنىڭ
bu lughet Ehmed-ning
that dictionary Akhmat-GEN
that dictionary is Akhmat's

The genitive can also be pronominalised, allowing the noun it indicates as possessed to be dropped. The use of the suffix -ki after it for this is optional, unless the word it is qualifying is not in the nominative case. For example:

مېنىڭ لۇغەتىم ياخشى ئەمەس، قاسىمنىڭ ياخشى
më-ning lughet-im yaxshi emes, qasim-ning yaxshi
1sg-GEN dictionary-POSS.1sg good is-not, Kasim-GEN good
My dictionary is no good, Kasim's is better

Not using -ki here is fine as Kasim's dictionary would also be in the nominative, but:

مېنىڭ ماقالەمنى باسمىدى، تۇرسۇننىڭكىنى باستى
më-ning maqalem-ni bas-mi-di, Turnsun-ning-ki-ni bas-ti
1sg-GEN article-ACC print-NEG-PST.3sg, Tursun-GEN-PRN-ACC print-PST.3sg
He didn't print my article, he printed Tursun's

As here Tursun's article would also take the accusative case, -ki must be used. Some nouns in the nominative act like genitive nouns, and require the nouns they qualify to take a possessive suffix. These are known as nouns in the nature of the possessive case, and produce closely bound noun phrases that are usually used in the place of one word. Qualifiers (i.e. adjectives) that come before the phrases qualify the entire phrase, not just the head word. For example:

ئۇزۇن تارىم دەرياسى
uzun tarim derya-si
long Tarim:GEN river-POSS.3sg
the long Tarim river (not "the Tarim's long river")

==== Dative ====
Dative nouns are usually subordinate to verbs or verbal phrases and act as adverbial modifiers. They can also be adjectival modifiers. For example, the dative case can indicate the target of an action (usually preceded by "to" in English):

بىز بېيجىڭغا كەلدۇق
biz Bëyjing-gha kel-duq
1pl Beijing-DAT come-PST.1pl
we came to Beijing

It can also indicate:

- The object of actions expressed by certain intransitive verbs
- The subject of verbs in the causative voice formed from transitive verbs
- The purpose of an action
- The instrument or price of certain actions

==== Accusative ====
Accusative-case nouns are subordinate to transitive verbs and indicate the object of their action, for example:

بۇ ئاتنى مەن مىنىمەن
bu at-ni men min-i-men
this horse-ACC 1sg ride-PRES.FUT-1sg
I will ride this horse

Sometimes nouns in the nominative case are the subject of transitive verbs, these are known as nouns in the nature of the accusative case and generalise the nature of the object, making its relation with the verb closer, and creating an object-verb phrase used in place of a simple verb. For example:

كىنو كۆرمەك
kino kör-mek
film watch-INF
to watch films

==== Locative ====
These nouns function as qualifiers (for mostly verbs, but sometimes adjectives) and signify the action's temporal or physical location. They indicate:

- The place where an action occurs.
- The time at which an action occurs, or the time for which it lasts.
- The circumstances or atmosphere in which an action occurs.
- The instrument of an action.

ئۇلار ئايىروپىلاندا كەلدى
ular ayiropilan-da kel-di
3pl aeroplane-LOC come-PST.3pl
They came by aeroplane.

When subordinate to an adjective, they indicate the place or field of an activity.

بۈگۈن مەكتەپتە كىنو يوق
bügün mektep-te kino yoq
today school-LOC film is.NEG
There is no film at school today.

When used as a predicate, they indicate the location or source of the subject.

سېنىڭ لۇغەتىڭ ئەھمەددە.
sëning lughet-ing Ehmed-de
2sg.GEN dictionary-POSS.2sg Akhmat-LOC
Akhmat has your dictionary.

==== Ablative ====
Ablative nouns are subordinate to verbs and sometimes adjectives and adverbs, and they mostly act as adverbial modifiers. It is usually associated with the pronoun "from" in English

When acting as an adverbial modifier, they can indicate:

- The point of departure/separation of the subject/recipient, or the object that is passed through.
- Things which are mentally distanced from the subject of an action.
- The source of an action.
- The starting point of a limit connected with an action.
- The material/components of the subject/recipient.
- A generality/group from which one or some are related to the action.
- The field covered by the action.
- The reason for the action (cause).

Ablative nouns subordinate to adjectives indicate unequal comparison. Some adjectives also sometimes require the ablative case for noun modifiers, for example:

ئۇلارنىڭ ئۆيى شەھەردىن يىراق
ular-ning öy-i sheher-din yiraq
3pl-GEN house-POSS.3pl town-ABL far
their house is far away from town

==== Locative-qualitative ====
These nouns function as qualifiers (for almost any part of speech) and signify the word's temporal or physical location. The difference between this and the locative case is that the qualifier is not specific, but general/universal. For example:

تۇرسۇندىكى كىتاب
Tursun-diki kitab
Tursun-LOC book
a book which Tursun has (lit. a book in Tursun's possession, it may or may not be his)

When context is clear, it is possible to drop the noun that the locative-qualitative case noun is qualifying and use this non-dropped noun pronominally, which also takes the cases of the dropped noun.

بۇ دوسكا بىزنىڭ سىنىپتىكىدىن بىر ھەسسە چوڭ
bu doska biz-ning sinip-tiki-din bir hesse chong
this blackboard 1pl-GEN classroom-LOC-ABL one times big
this blackboard is as big again as the one in our classroom

==== Limitative ====
These nouns are subordinate to verbs and function as adverbial modifiers, and sometimes as the predicate.

When they modify verbs, they indicate the final point reached as a limit of an action, for example:

مەن بۇ قېتىم خوتەنگىچە بارىمەن
men bu qëtim xoten-giche bar-i-men
1sg this occasion-POSS.1sg Hotan-LIM go-PRES.FUT-1sg
this time I will go as far as Hotan

When a limitative case noun acts as a predicate, it indicates the final limit of the subject.

==== Similitude ====
Nouns in the similitude case can act as qualifiers or adverbial modifiers, in both cases they liken the quality/action to their base noun. For example:

ھاۋا ئوتتەك قىزىپ كەتتى
hawa ot-tek qizip ketti
weather fire-SIM hot turn-PST.3sg
the weather became as hot as fire

==== Equivalence ====
Nouns in the equivalence case can act as qualifiers or adverbial modifiers, in both cases they liken the quality/action to their base noun, with respect to the level/amount/measurement. For example:

ئۇمۇ تۇرسۇنچىلىك ئوقۇغان
umu tursun-chilik oqu-ghan
3sg-also Tursun-EQV study-PERF.PRES
he's also studied to the same level as Tursun

=== Possessive Suffixes ===
Uyghur, like Uzbek, has possessive suffixes that indicate person.

Possessor number	Singular	Plural
1st	-م، -ىم، -ۇم، -ۈم -(I)m	-مىز، -ىمىز -(i)miz
2nd Informal	-ڭ، -ىڭ، -ۇڭ، -ۈڭ -(I)ng	-ڭلار، -ىڭلار، -ۇڭلار، -ۈڭلار -(I)nglar
2nd Polite	-ڭىز، -ىڭىز -(i)ngiz	n/a
2nd Respectful	-لىرى -liri	
3rd	-سى، -ى -(s)i	

Monosyllabic nouns ending in rounded vowels (i.e. su) will add a y before first and second person suffixes (i.e. suyum, suyingiz but susi).

=== Noun-formation affixes ===
Uyghur has a wide variety of affixes which form words from others. This section will go over noun-formation affixes.

==== Affixes which derive nouns from nouns ====
Suffix	Description	Example	Translation
-chi	Indicates those engaged in the action or occupation indicated by the noun.	tömür-chi	blacksmith
-chi	Indicates those who belong to a school of thought, organisation, etc. indicated by the noun.	marksizm-chi	Marxist
-dash	Indicates people who possess an identity or commonality with things indicated by the noun.	sinip-dash	schoolmate
-lIK	Indicates the occupation in which a noun indicating a person engaged in work is engaged in.	tömürchi-lik	blacksmithing
-lIK	Indicates a place with many plants/substances if the noun indicates a plant/substance.	qarighay-lik	pine forest
-lIK	Indicates a characteristic unique to a certain kind of person when attached to a person-indicating noun.	bali-liq	childishness
-lIK	Indicates a thing useful for the thing expressed by the noun.	kün-lük	umbrella
-lIK	Indicates a person who was born/grew up in a place, when attached to a place noun.	Qeshqer-lik	a Kashgarite
-chiliK	Indicates a relationship based on the concept expressed by the base noun.	shirik-chilik	partnership
-che	Indicates the language/script of a nationality when attached to a nationality noun.	Türk-che	Turkish (language)
-che	Common diminutive.	kitab-che	booklet
-xana	Indicates places where the base noun is kept/are associated with the base noun.	kitab-xana	bookshop
-shunas	Indicates experts who carry out research on the base noun.	til-shunas	linguist
-zar	Indicates a place where many plants of the base noun type are grown.	gül-zar	flowerbed
-dan	Indicates vessels into which the base noun is put.	su-dan	water bottle
-name	Indicates letters/documents/books about the base noun, or matters concerning it.	jeng-name	war story
-iye	Indicates the territory inhabited by a nation.	Türk-iye	Turkey (country)
-istan	Indicates the territory inhabited by a nation, or a place where many of the base noun exist.	gül-istan	flowerbed or garden
-w/baz	Indicates a person devoted to the base noun.	qimar-waz	gambler
-xor	A person who eats/drink the base noun (potentially to excess).	chay-xor	tea addict
-kar	Experts who produce the base noun.	paxti-kar	cotton grower
-kar	One who assumes the object indicated by the base noun.	gunah-kar	sinner
-kar	The owner of the base noun.	telep-kar	demanding person
-dar	The person who possesses the base noun.	zëmin-dar	landlord
-pez	Person who cooks food expressed by the base noun.	samsi-pez	Samsa chef
-k/ger	Person whose job it is produce something from or engage in the base noun.	mis-ker	coppersmith
-kesh	Someone who is engaged in an activity connected with or bears the base noun.	mëhnet-kesh	labourer
-w/ben	Someone who looks after or manages the base noun.	derwazi-wen	doorkeeper
-purush	Someone who sells the base noun.	kitab-purush	bookseller
-xan	Someone who reads the base noun.	Dua-xan	prayer reader
-gah	The place of activity connected to the base noun.	jeng-gah	battlefield
hem-	A person who shares in the whole of the base noun.	hem-tawaq	fellow diner
-DUrUK	An article related to the base noun.	boyun-turuq	horse/ox yoke
-darchiliq	The state of people in a relationship expressed by the base noun.	qoshni-darchiliq	neighbourliness
-gerchilik	A characteristic specific to people indicated by the base noun.	adem-gerchilik	humaneness
-izm	A belief, way, or principle related to the base noun.	dëmokrat-izm	democracy
-chU/AK	Nouns that indicate a small thing related to the base noun.	yem-chük	fish bait.

==== Affixes which derive nouns from adjectives ====
Suffix	Description	Example	Translation
-lIK	Indicates the name of the quality indicated by the adjective.	sezgür-lük	sensitivity
-chiliK	indicates the quality + state/situation/universality indicated by the adjective.	qurghaq-chiliq	dryness

==== Affixes which derive nouns from verbs ====
Suffix	Description	Example	Translation
-GU/A	Indicates the means of the action expressed by the verb.	külke	smile/laughter
-GUchi	Indicates someone engaged in the action expressed by the verb.	yaz-guchi	writer
-(I)sh	Indicates the name of the action expressed by the verb.	ögin-ish	study
-mAK	Indicates the result/means of the action expressed by the verb.	tëpish-maq	riddle
-GUch	Indicates the means of the action expressed by the verb.	siz-guch	ruler, straight edge
-mA	Indicates the result/means of the action expressed by the verb.	qolyaz-ma	draft, manuscript
-(I)m	Indicates the result of the action expressed by the verb.	böl-üm	chapter, part
-G[i/ü]n	Indicates the result of the action expressed by the verb.	kel-kün	flood
-(A/U)K	Indicates the result/means/place of the action expressed by the verb.	sina-q	experiment/test
-(i/ü)n	Indicates the result of the action expressed by the verb.	yëgh-in	rainfall
-(I)ndi	Indicates the result of the action expressed by the verb.	yigh-indi	collection
-duq	Indicates the result of the action expressed by the verb.	qal-duq	dregs/remainder
-mIsh	Indicates the result/object of the action expressed by the verb.	öt-müsh	the past
-GEK	Indicates an object possessing a feature inclined towards the action of the verb.	chaq-qaq	nettke
-(i)nchA	Indicates the means of the action expressed by the verb.	sël-incha	cushion
-mchi	Indicates the subject of the action expressed by the verb.	bashla-mchi	guide, pioneer
-GUlUK	Indicates the abstract object of the action expressed by the verb.	kör-gülük	suffering

== Adjectives ==
Adjectives in Uyghur can often be used as adverbial modifiers, and indicate the quality of an object or action.

Most adjectives can have their degree modified, and these are known as "gradable" adjectives. However, it is impossible to strengthen or weaken some adjectives (i.e. ئەركەك, erkek, 'male'), which are known as "non-gradable" adjectives.

=== Degree ===
There are a variety of ways to indicate degree when it comes to gradable adjectives.

==== Degree affixes ====
Name	Affix	Description	Example	Translation
Positive degree	none	The original form of the adjective, indicates the normal degree of the quality expressed by the adjective.	كىچىك kichik	small
Decreasing degree	-rAK	Indicates a slight weakening of the quality and can indicate a softer tone.	كىچىكرەك kichik-rek	a bit small
Emphatic degree	first syllable+p-	Indicates a strengthening of the quality, or the speaker's feeling. Less productive than the decreasing degree. Formed using a prefix that takes the first syllable and adds p to its constituent vowel.	كىپكىچىك kip-kichik	extremely small
Endearing degree	-GinA	Expresses that the speaker is indicating the quality with a tone of endearment/fondness/intensification. Very unproductive.	كىچىككىنە kichik-kine	delightfully small

==== Reduplication ====
This is known as "the repeated form" and emphasises that the quality is unique to a large number of things of the same type, or that the action possessing the quality indicated by the adjective is repeated many times.

ئەزالار پىلاننى ئەمەلگە ئاشۇرۇشنىڭ يېڭى-يېڭى چارە-تەدبىرلىرى ئۈستىدە ئويلىنىۋاتىدۇ
eza-lar pilan-ni emelge ashurush-ning yëngi-yëngi chare-tedbir-lir-i üstide oylin-iwat-idu
member-PL plan-ACC implement something-GEN new-REDUP remedy-means-PL-POSS.3sg over contemplate-CONT-PRES.3pl
"the members are considering many new ways of implementing the plan"

=== Nominalisation ===
Some adjectives can be directly turned into nouns, for example:

سوغۇق چۈشكىچە ئىشلارنى تۈگىتىۋالايلى
soghuq chüshkiche ish-lar-ni tügi-t-iwal-ayli
cold noon-LIM job-PL-ACC complete-DV.SBJ-IMP.2pl
"before the cold comes let's try and finish the jobs"

They can also function as nouns when the noun is dropped, indicating objects with the quality they have.

=== Adjective-formation suffixes ===
==== Affixes that derive adjectives from nouns ====
Suffix	Description	Example	Translation
-lIK	Implies the existence/abundance of the base noun.	su-luq	juicy, watered
-lIK	Indicates a characteristic specific to the base noun.	marksizm-liq	Marxist
-lIK	Indicates a characteristic related to the time expressed by a time noun.	etigen-lik (uyqu)	midday (nap)
-lIK	Indicates a characteristic giving rise to the base noun.	qayghu-luq (jewer)	sad (news)
-lIK	Indicates the notion of "at the level of the district/region expressed by the noun"	ölki-lik (hökümet)	provincial (government)
-lIK	Indicates a special feature characterised by riding on the base noun (animal/vehicle)	at-liq	on horseback
-siz	Implies a lack of/extremely small amount of the base noun.	su-siz	dry
-chan	Indicates a characteristic that tends towards an action related to the base noun.	söz-chan	talkative
-chan	Implies that the base noun (if clothing) is being worn.	könglek-chan	in a shirt
-chi	Indicates a characteristic that tends towards the base noun.	chataq-chi	trouble-making
-chil	Indicates a characteristic that tends towards the base noun.	inqilab-chil	pro-revolutionary
-siman	Indicates a similarity to the base noun.	adem-siman	humanoid
-iy/wi	Indicates a trait characterised by the base noun.	din-iy	religious
-peres	Indicates the characteristic of pursuing or worshipping the base noun.	emel-peres	power-hungry
-perwer	Indicates the characteristic of loving the base noun.	weten-perwer	patriotic
bi-	Implies the absence of the base noun.	bi-haya	shameless
na-	Implies the absence of the base noun.	na-ümid	hopeless
bet-	Indicates poor quality/vulgar according to the base noun.	bet-tem	tasteless

==== Affixes that derive adjectives from verbs and adverbs ====
Suffix	Description	Example	Translation
-(I)K	Implies that the quality has been produced as a result of the verb.	sun-uq	broken
-mA	Implies that the quality has been produced as a result of the verb or is appropriate to its action.	pükli-me	folding
-GEK	Indicates a characteristic tending towards the action of the verb.	urush-qaq	combative
-chAK	Indicates a characteristic tending towards the action of the verb.	maxtan-chaq	boastful
-(A)ngGU	Indicates a characteristic tending towards the action of the verb.	chëchil-ang'ghu	disorderly
-GUr	Indicates a characteristic tending towards the action of the verb.	uch-qur	fast
-lIK	Indicates a characteristic applicable or related to the action of the verb. Only attached to verbal nouns ending in -sh	yë-yish-lik	delicious
-GIn	Indicates a characteristic that has/will carry out the action of the verb.	tut-qun	arrested
-Ki	When used with adverbs of time or position, this implies the time or position of the adverb.	bügün-ki	today's

== Copulas ==
Like most Turkic languages, copulas are important to verbs, and some are words that have become fixed in a single form ("incomplete copulas", some of which are suffixes), although "complete copulas", which are entirely separate words, do exist.

=== Null copula ===
In the present tense, it is not essential to use a copula, for example:

بۇ كىتاب
bu kitab
this book
"This is a book."

=== Mood-tense copulas ===
Uyghur mood-tense copulas
Mood	Direct judgement		Indirect judgement	Hearsay		Subjective assessment		Objective assessment
Tense	Present	Past	Present/Past	Present	Past	Present	Past	Present/Past
1sg	-men	idim	ikenmen	-dekmen	ikenmishmen	-durmen	bolghiydim	bolsam kërek
1pl	-miz	iduq	ikenmiz	-dekmiz	ikenmishmiz	-durmiz	bolghiyduq	bolsaq kërek
2sg informal	-sen	iding	ikensen	-deksen	ikenmishsen	-dursen	bolghiyding	bolsang kërek
2sg polite	-siz	idingiz	ikensiz	-deksiz	ikenmishsiz	-dursiz	bolghiydingiz	bolsingiz kërek
2sg respectful	-la	idile	ikenla	-dekla	ikenmishla	-durla	bolghiydile	bolsila kërek
2pl	-siler	idinglar	ikensiler	-deksiler	ikenmishsiler	-dursiler	bolghiydinglar	bolsanglar kërek
3sg/pl	-Dur	idi	iken	-deng	ikenmish	-dur	bolghiydi	bolsa kërek

These copulas can differ between regions, the forms given in the table are those used in Northern Xinjiang.

==== Negative judgement copula ====
The negative copula, emes, does not inflect for person or tense. For example:

بۇ كىتاب ئەمەس
bu kitab emes
this book NEG
"This is not a book."

== Verbs ==
Verbs in Uyghur inflect in a variety of ways, such as for tense, aspect, and mood.

=== Infinitives ===
There are two infinitival suffixes in Uyghur, -(I)sh and -mAK. -(I)sh is used in most situations where the infinitive and gerund is used in English, primarily when discussing an action as a noun, as such -(I)sh is often accompanied by the accusative -ni. For example:

بىز ئۇيغۇرچە ئۆگىنىشنى ياخشى كۆرىمىز
biz Uyghurche ögin-ish-ni yaxshi kör-i-miz
1pl Uyghur study-INF-ACC good look-PRES.FUT-1pl
"We like to study Uyghur"

ئوقۇش تەس ئەمەس
oq-ush tes emes
read-INF difficult is-NEG
"reading is not difficult" (lit. to read is not difficult)

=== Person ===
While some tenses inflect for person, some such as the future-present tense simply go between the stem and the following personal suffixes.

Uyghur verb personal suffixes
Person	Singular	Plural
1st	-men	-miz
2nd Informal	-sen	-siler
2nd Polite	-siz	-la
3rd	-du	

These are by far the most common suffixes, and are known as "type 1" suffixes. The possessive markers are also used with some tenses, and in this context are known as "type 2".

Uyghur verb personal suffixes, -di variant
Person	Singular	Plural
1st	-DIm	-Duq
2nd Informal	-DIng	-DInglar
2nd Polite	-Dingiz	-Dila
3rd	-Di	

=== State-Tense ===
Tömür describes Uyghur as having four states and three tenses, with all of the states being able to take past and present tenses, thus producing nine state-tenses for verbs. Some of these have multiple variants.

The archiphoneme Y here is y after vowels, i after consonants, and yi if the verb is "yu". The archiphoneme K is much like G but is always voiceless.

Uyghur state-tense suffixes (direct statement mood)
State	n/a	Perfect		Imperfect			Continuous		Intention	
Tense	Simple Past	Present	Past	Present	Past		Present	Past	Present	Past
Construction	-D+type 2	-GAn(+type 1) (Note: This is the perfect participial form of the verb (GAn) + the present tense direct judgement copula. The addition of the copula here can be omitted if the subject has not been dropped from the sentence.)	-GAnid+type 2 (Note: This is the perfect participial form of the verb (GAn) + the past tense direct judgement copula.)	-Y+type 1	-Att+type 2 (Note: This is At + the past tense of the direct judgement copula)	-Arid+type 2 (Note: This is Ar + the past tense of the direct judgement copula)	-mAKtA+type 1 (Note: This is the -mAK gerund form of the verb + the locative case marker DA + the present tense of the direct judgement copula. Note that the A is raised to i. The (I)wat infix + present imperfect forms can also be used here.)	-mAKtA+ id+type 2 (Note: This is the -mAK gerund form of the verb + the locative case marker DA + the past tense of the direct judgement copula. Note that the A is raised to i. The (I)wat infix + simple past can also be used here.)	-mAKchi(+type 1) (Note: This is the -mAKchi verb of intention form of the verb + the present tense of the direct judgement copula. The copula may be dropped when the subject is explicit.)	-mAKchid+type 2 (Note: This is the -mAKchi verb of intention form of the verb + the past tense of the direct judgement copula. The two "i"s are condensed into one.)
1sg	-DIm	-GAnmen	-GAnidim	-Ymen	-Attim	-Aridim	-mAKtimen	-mAKta idim	-mAKchimen	-mAKchidim
1pl	-duq	-GAnmiz	-GAniduq	-Ymiz	-Attuq	-Ariduq	-mAKtimiz	-mAKta iduq	-mAKchimiz	-mAKchiduq
2sg informal	-DIng	-GAnsen	-GAniding	-Ysen	-Atting	-Ariding	-mAKtisen	-mAKta iding	-mAKchisen	-mAKchiding
2sg polite	-Dingiz	-GAnsiz	-GAnidingiz	-Ysiz	-Attingiz	-Aridingiz	-mAKtisiz	-mAKta idingiz	-mAKchisiz	-mAKchidingiz
2pl informal	-DInglar	-GAnsiler	-GAnidinglar	-Ysiler	-Attinglar	-Aridinglar	-mAKtisiler	-mAKta idinglar	-mAKchisiler	-mAKchidinglar
2pl polite	-DingizlAr	-GAnsiler	-GAnidile	-Yla	-Attila	-Aridile	-mAKtisiler	-mAKta idinglar	-mAKchila	-mAKchidinglar
3sg/3pl	-Di	-GAndu	-GAnidi	-Ydu	-Atti	-Aridi	-mAKta	-mAKta idi	-mAKchi	-mAKchidi

==== Simple past tense ====
The simple past tense always indicates that the action or state expressed by the verb took place before the time of speaking, no matter the mood of the verb.

ئەخمەت ماقالە يازدى
Exmet maqale yaz-di
Akhmat article write-PST.3sg
"Akhmat wrote an article"

It can also be used in some special senses to indicate that the action will take place immediately, show an absolute determination to carry out the action, or indicate the sense of hypothesis.

مەن ماڭدىم
men mang-dim
1sg walk-PST.1sg
"I'm leaving (right now)" lit. I've left

==== Present perfect tense ====
The present perfect tense indicates the current existence of the state which the action has brought about. It differs from the simple past tense in requiring the action to be completed to a degree that it has changed the state of the object.

بۇ ماقالىنى ئەخمەت يازغان
Bu maqali-ni Exmet yaz-ghan
this essay-ACC Akhmat write-PERF.3sg
"Akhmat has written this essay"

==== Past perfect tense ====
The past perfect tense indicates the existence of the state which the action has brought about before another related matter, or at a specific point in the past.

خەت يازغانىدىم ئۇزاق ئۆتمەي جاۋاپ كەلدى
xet yaz-ghanidim uzaq ötmey jawap kel-di
letter write-PERF.PST.1sg not long reply arrive-PST.3sg
"the reply came not long after I had written the letter"

==== Present imperfect tense ====
The present imperfect tense indicates the present existence the state of an action that regularly/always occurs, or will occur later. This includes actions such as:

- Actions that always happen according to objective laws and logic
- Actions that express temperament/habits
- Actions which express character, special skills, etc
- Actions which indicate a job or daily activity
- Actions which always happen according to rule
- Actions that definitely will happen according to logic, or have been decided will happen.
- Actions which indicate determination or which the speaker considers will happen.

كۈن شەرقتىن چىقىدۇ
kün sherq-tin chiq-idu
sun east-ABL rise-IMPERF.3sg
"The sun rises from the east"

==== Past imperfect tense ====
The present imperfect tense indicates the existence the state of an action that regularly/always occurs, or will occur later, at some point in the past or before a related matter. This includes actions such as:

- An action/matter that happened continuously in the past, i.e. "used to teach"
- An intention, plan, or agreement about carrying out an action before a certain matter.
- A conjecture about an action that has not taken place, or will definitely not take place.
- When a writer is talking about things that were happening before or at the time of the event.

مەن ئۈرۈمچىگە باراتتىم
men Ürümchi-ge bar-attim
1sg Urumqi-DAT go-IMPERF.PST.1sg
"I had planned to go to Urumqi" (note that this is an example of the second variety)

==== Present continuous tense ====
The present continuous tense indicates the present existence of a continuously ongoing or fixed state of an action.

مەن ماقالە يازماقتىمەن
men maqale yaz-maqtimen
1sg essay write-CONT.1sg
"I am writing an essay"

==== Past continuous tense ====
The present continuous tense indicates the existence of a continuously ongoing or fixed state of an action at a previous time or before a certain matter.

مەن ماقالە يازماقتا ئىدىم
men maqale yaz-maqta idim
1sg essay write-CONT PST.1sg
"I was writing an essay"

==== Present intention tense ====
The present intention tense indicates the present existence of an action that has been intended or agreed upon.

ئۇ سىزگە بىرنەرسە بەرمەكچى
u siz-ge birnerse ber-mekchi
3sg 2sg-DAT something give-INTENT.3sg
"He wants to give you something"

==== Past intention tense ====
The present intention tense indicates the existence of an action that has been intended or agreed upon, before a certain matter.

مەن ئۈرۈمچىگە بارماقچىدىم
men Ürümchi-ge bar-maqchidim
1sg Urumqi-DAT go-INTENT.PST.1sg
"I had planned to go to Urumqi"

=== Mood ===
These verb endings can differ between regions, the forms given in the table are those used in Kashgar.

==== Direct statement mood ====
The direct statement mood indicates that the subject matter is something the speaker knows first-hand. It is the most common mood.

==== Indirect statement mood ====
The indirect statement mood indicates that the subject matter is something the speaker knows indirectly (has learned of recently from facts/information given by others). Most often translated with the English word "apparently".

بۇ بىنالار 1950-يىلى سېلىنغانىكەن
bu bina-lar 1950-yili sëlin-ghaniken
this building-PL 1950-year built-INDIR.PERF.PST.3sg
"Apparently, these buildings were built in 1950."

Uyghur state-tense suffixes (indirect statement mood)
State	n/a	Perfect		Imperfect		Continuous		Intention	
Tense	Simple Past	Present	Past	Present	Past	Present	Past	Present	Past
Construction	-Ip(ti)+type 1	-Iptiken+type 1	-GAniken+type 1 (Note: This can also represent the perfect present tense, and is the form used mostly in literature and films for both.)	-Ydiken+type 1	-Ydiken+type 1	-Ip tUrUpti+type 1	-(I)watidiken+type 1	-mAKchiken+type 1	-mAKchiken+type 1
1sg	-Iptimen	-Iptikenmen	-GAnikenmen	-Ydikenmen	-Ydikenmen	-Ip tUrUptimen	-(I)watidikenmen	-mAKchikenmen	-mAKchikenmen
1pl	-Iptimiz	-Iptikenmiz	-GAnikenmiz	-Ydikenmiz	-Ydikenmiz	-Ip tUrUptimiz	-(I)watidikenmiz	-mAKchikenmiz	-mAKchikenmiz
2sg informal	-Ipsen	-Iptikensen	-GAnikensen	-Ydikensen	-Ydikensen	-Ip tUrUptisen	-(I)watidikensen	-mAKchikensen	-mAKchikensen
2sg polite	-Ipsiz	-Iptikensiz	-GAnikensiz	-Ydikensiz	-Ydikensiz	-Ip tUrUptisiz	-(I)watidikensiz	-mAKchikensiz	-mAKchikensiz
2pl informal	-Ipsiler	-Iptikensiler	-GAnikensiler	-Ydikensiler	-Ydikensiler	-Ip tUrUptisiler	-(I)watidikensiler	-mAKchikensiler	-mAKchikensiler
2pl polite	-Iptila	-Iptikenla	-GAnikenla	-Ydikenla	-Ydikenla	-Ip tUrUptila	-(I)watidikenla	-mAKchikenla	-mAKchikenla
3sg/3pl	-Iptu	-Iptiken	-GAniken	-Ydiken	-Ydiken	-Ip tUrUptu	-(I)watidiken	-mAKchiken	-mAKchiken(duq)

==== Hearsay mood ====
The hearsay mood indicates that the subject matter is something the speaker has heard of from others. Mostly translated with "they say that", "SUBJ has heard that", or "supposedly".

بۇ ماقالىنى ئەخمەت يېزىپتۇدەك
bu maqali-ni Exmet yëz-iptudek
this letter-ACC Akhmat write-HEARSAY.PST.3sg
"they say Akhmat wrote this letter"

It can also be used for:

- Describing dreams
- Talking in a sarcastic manner

Uyghur state-tense suffixes (hearsay mood)
State	n/a		Perfect		Imperfect		Continuous		Intention	
Tense	Simple Past		Present	Past	Present	Past	Present	Past	Present	Past
Construction	-Iptimish+type 1	-Iptudek+type 1	-GAnmish+type 1	-GAnikenmish+type 1	-GUdek+type 1	-Ydikenmish+type 1	-(I)watarmish+type 1	-(I)watidikenmish+type 1	-mAKchidek+type 1	-mAKchiken+type 1+mish
1sg	-Iptimishmen	-Iptudekmen	-GAnmishmen	-GAnikenmishmen	-GUdekmen	-Ydikenmishmen	-(I)watarmishmen	-(I)watidikenmishmen	-mAKchidekmen	-mAKchikenmenmish
1pl	-Iptimishmiz	-Iptudekmiz	-GAnmishmiz	-GAnikenmishmiz	-GUdekmiz	-Ydikenmishmiz	-(I)watarmishmiz	-(I)watidikenmishmiz	-mAKchidekmiz	-mAKchikenmizmish
2sg informal	-Iptimishsen	-Iptudeksen	-GAnmishsen	-GAnikenmishsen	-GUdeksen	-Ydikenmishsen	-(I)watarmishsen	-(I)watidikenmishsen	-mAKchideksen	-mAKchikensenmish
2sg polite	-Iptimishsiz	-Iptudeksiz	-GAnmishsiz	-GAnikenmishsiz	-GUdeksiz	-Ydikenmishsiz	-(I)watarmishsiz	-(I)watidikenmishsiz	-mAKchideksiz	-mAKchikensizmish
2pl informal	-Iptimishsiler	-Iptudeksiler	-GAnmishsiler	-GAnikenmishsiler	-GUdeksiler	-Ydikenmishsiler	-(I)watarmishsiler	-(I)watidikenmishsiler	-mAKchideksiler	-mAKchikensilermish
2pl polite	-Iptimishla	-Iptudekla	-GAnmishla	-GAnikenmishla	-GUdekla	-Ydikenmishla	-(I)watarmishla	-(I)watidikenmishla	-mAKchidekla	-mAKchikenlamish
3sg/3pl	-Iptimish	-Iptudek	-GAnmish	-GAnikenmish	-GUdek	-Ydikenmish	-(I)watarmish	-(I)watidikenmish	-mAKchideng	-mAKchikenmish

==== Subjective assessment mood ====
The subjective assessment mood indicates that the subject matter is something that has been assessed in a subjective manner. Usually translated with "think", "guess", or "believe".

سىز تاماكا چېكىسىزغۇ دەيمەن
siz tamaka chëki-siz-ghu deymen
2sg tobacco smoke-2sg-IMPERF.PRES SUBJASS
"I think that you smoke"

Uyghur state-tense suffixes (subjective assessment mood)
State	n/a	Perfect		Imperfect		Continuous		Intention	
Tense	Simple Past	Present	Past	Present	Past	Present	Past	Present	Past
Construction	-GAn(di)+type 1	-GAn(type 1)ghu deymen (Note: The personal suffix here can be left out if the subject has not been dropped from the sentence.)	-GAn bolghiy+type 2	-type 1+ghu deymen	-idighan bolghiy+type2	-(I)watqan(di)+type 1	-(I)watqan bolghiy+type 2	-mAKchi+type 1+ghu deymen	-mAKchi bolghiyd+type 2
1sg	-GAndimen	-GAnghu deymen	-GAn bolghiydim	-menghu deymen	-idighan bolghiydim	-(I)watqandimen	-(I)watqan bolghiydim	-mAKchimenghu deymen	-mAKchi bolghiydim
1pl	-GAndimiz	-GAnghu deymen	-GAn bolghiyduq	-mizghu deymen	-idighan bolghiyduq	-(I)watqandimiz	-(I)watqan bolghiyduq	-mAKchimizghu deymen	-mAKchi bolghiyduq
2sg informal	-GAnsen	-GAnghu deymen	-GAn bolghiyding	-senghu deymen	-idighan bolghiyding	-(I)watqansen	-(I)watqan bolghiyding	-mAKchisenghu deymen	-mAKchi bolghiyding
2sg polite	-GAnsiz	-GAnghu deymen	-GAn bolghiydingiz	-sizghu deymen	-idighan bolghiydingiz	-(I)watqansiz	-(I)watqan bolghiydingiz	-mAKchisizghu deymen	-mAKchi bolghiydingiz
2pl informal	-GAnsiler	-GAnghu deymen	-GAn bolghiydile	-silerghu deymen	-idighan bolghiydile	-(I)watqansiler	-(I)watqan bolghiydile	-mAKchisilerghu deymen	-mAKchi bolghiydile
2pl polite	-ishqanla	-GAnghu deymen	-GAn bolghiydinglar	-laghu deymen	-idighan bolghiydinglar	-(I)watqanla	-(I)watqan bolghiydinglar	-mAKchilaghu deymen	-mAKchi bolghiydinglar
3sg/3pl	-GAndu	-GAnghu deymen	-GAn bolghiydi	-idghu deymen	-idighan bolghiydi	-(I)watqandu	-(I)watqan bolghiydi	-mAKchighu deymen	-mAKchi bolghiydi

==== Objective assessment mood ====
The objective assessment mood indicates that the subject matter is something that has been assessed according to certain facts, and it is usually translated with "looks as", "seems", "must have", etc. It does not inflect for tense, only for state.

سىز تاماكا چېكىدىغان ئوخشايسىز
siz tamaka chëk-idighan oxshay-siz
2sg tobacco smoke-IMPERF OBJASS-2sg
"it seems as if you smoke"

Uyghur state-tense suffixes (objective assessment mood)
State	n/a	Perfect	Imperfect	Continuous	Intention
Tense	Simple Past	Present/Past	Present/Past	Present/Past	Present/Past
Construction	-GAn oxshay+type 1	-GAn oxshay+type 1	-idighan oxshay+type 1	-(I)watqan oxshay+type 1	-mAKchi oxshay+type 1
1sg	-GAn oxshaymen	-GAn oxshaymen	-idighan oxshaymen	-(I)watqan oxshaymen	-mAKchi oxshaymen
1pl	-GAn oxshaymiz	-GAn oxshaymiz	-idighan oxshaymiz	-(I)watqan oxshaymiz	-mAKchi oxshaymiz
2sg informal	-GAn oxshaysen	-GAn oxshaysen	-idighan oxshaysen	-(I)watqan oxshaysen	-mAKchi oxshaysen
2sg polite	-GAn oxshaysiz	-GAn oxshaysiz	-idighan oxshaysiz	-(I)watqan oxshaysiz	-mAKchi oxshaysiz
2pl informal	-GAn oxshaysiler	-GAn oxshaysiler	-idighan oxshaysiler	-(I)watqan oxshaysiler	-mAKchi oxshaysiler
2pl polite	-GAn oxshayla	-GAn oxshayla	-idighan oxshayla	-(I)watqan oxshayla	-mAKchi oxshayla
3sg/3pl	-GAn oxshaydu	-GAn oxshaydu	-idighan oxshaydu	-(I)watqan oxshaydu	-mAKchi oxshaydu

==== Imperative (command-request) mood ====
The imperative mood, and all following moods, do not inflect based on state-tense.

The objective assessment mood indicates that the subject matter of the sentence is spoken in a matter that denotes:

- Requesting
- Instructing/ordering
- Complying
- Appealing
- Wishing

سىز بېرىڭ
siz bër-ing
2sg go-IMP.2sg
"you can go"

It may also indicate that the listener is being requested to wait until the subject matter has finished/ceased. The suffix -Gin can also be attached to the end of the verb to give an affectionate mood to the command/request.

Uyghur imperative mood suffixes
1sg	-(A)y
1pl	-(A)yli
2sg informal	∅
2sg polite	-(I)ng
2pl informal	-(I)nglar
2pl polite	-(I)shsilA
3sg/3pl	-sun

==== Hypothesis-objection (conditional) mood ====
The hypothesis-objection mood can indicate either a hypothetical mood to the subject matter of the sentence, like below:

تىرىشساڭ، ئالغا باسىسەن
tirish-sang, algha bas-isen
strive-COND.2sg, progress make-IMPERF.PRES.2sg
"if you try hard, you will make progress"

or it can indicate that the subject matter is spoken in opposition to another, as below:

بارساق ئۆيىدە يوق ئىكەن
bar-saq, öyi-de yoq iken
go-COND.1pl, home-LOC NEG INDIR.3sg
"we went, but it seemed he wasn't at home"

Uyghur conditional mood suffixes
1sg	-sAm
1pl	-sAK
2sg informal	-sAng
2sg polite	-singiz
2pl informal	-sAnglar
2pl polite	-(I)shsilA
3sg/3pl	-sA

==== Hope-polite request mood ====
This is formed by attaching the -iken auxiliary to the verb's hypothesis-objection mood form. The auxiliary may sometimes be omitted.

It indicates that the subject matter of the sentence is spoken in the manner of a petition, desire, or polite request.

ماڭا ئىككى كۈنلۈك رۇخسەت بېرىلسىكەن
manga ikki künlük ruxset bëril-siken
1sg-DAT two day permission give-HOPE.3sg
"please could I be given two days' leave"

Uyghur hope-polite request mood suffixes
1sg	-sAmiken
1pl	-sAKiken
2sg informal	-sAngiken
2sg polite	-singiziken
2pl informal	-sAnglariken
2pl polite	-(I)shsiliken
3sg/3pl	-siken

==== Wish mood ====
This is formed by attaching the past tense direct judgement copula to the verb's hypothesis-objection mood form. The copula may sometimes be omitted.

1sg	-sAmidim
1pl	-sAKiduq
2sg informal	-sAngiding
2sg polite	-singizidingiz
2pl informal	-sAnglaridile
2pl polite	-(I)shsilAidinglar
3sg/3pl	-sAidi

==== Regret mood ====
1sg	-sAmchu	-sAm boptiken	-sAm bolghaniken
1pl	-sAKchu	-sAK boptiken	-sAK bolghaniken
2sg informal	-sAngchu	-sAng boptiken	-sAng bolghaniken
2sg polite	-singizchu	-singiz boptiken	-singiz bolghaniken
2pl informal	-sAnglarchu	-sAnglar boptiken	-sAnglar bolghaniken
2pl polite	-(I)shsilAchu	-(I)shsilA boptiken	-(I)shsilA bolghaniken
3sg/3pl	-sAchu	-sA boptiken	-sA bolghaniken

==== Entreaty mood ====
1sg	-(A)ychu
1pl	-(A)ylichu
2sg informal	-chu
2sg polite	-(I)ngchu
2pl informal	-(I)nglarchu
2pl polite	-(I)shsilAchu
3sg/3pl	-sunchu

==== Anxiety mood ====
The underlying structure of this is -ma+GAy+past tense direct judgement copula, but both a's are raised to i.

1sg	-miGiydim
1pl	-miGiyduq
2sg informal	-miGiyding
2sg polite	-miGiydingiz
2pl informal	-miGiydinglar
2pl polite	-miGiydila
3sg/3pl	-miGiydi

==== Necessity mood ====
1sg	-sAm bolidu
1pl	-sAK bolidu
2sg informal	-sAng bolidu
2sg polite	-singiz bolidu
2pl informal	-sAnglar bolidu
2pl polite	-(I)shsilA bolidu
3sg/3pl	-sA bolidu

=== Aspect ===
There are a variety of ways to indicate aspect with respect to verbs in Uyghur, including the use of infixes and auxiliary verbs.

==== Auxiliary Verbs and the -(I)p converb ====
The addition of the converb suffix -(I)p to the main verb, then followed by an auxiliary inflected verb, can indicate aspect, in a form known as the aspectual complement. Auxiliary verbs can also be used to indicate direction with verbs like bar-, kel-, ket-, (to go, to come, to leave) in a form known as the directional complement. For example:

مەن سىلەرنى ساقلاپ تۇرىمەن
men siler-ni saqla-p tur-i-men
1sg 2pl-ACC wait-CVB continue-PRES.FUT-1sg
"I will keep waiting for you."

Here the main verb is saqla- (to wait), with tur- being the auxiliary (meaning to continue; keep on, in its auxiliary form). The negative form of -(I)p is -mAy, but the suffix -mAstin can also be used, although it is considerably more informal and limited to the past tense. Example:

ئۇ مېنى ساقلىماي كەتتى
u mëni saqli-may ket-ti
3sg 1sg.ACC wait-CVB.NEG leave-PRES.PST-3sg
"He left without waiting for me"

-(I)p, as a converb suffix, can be used in many other ways, such as to link verbs or even entire clauses and sentences. When this is done only the final verb is inflected for person and tense. For example:

مەن بازارغا بېرىپ، ئالما ئېلىپ، تاماق يەپ، ئۆيگە قايتتىم.
men bazar-gha bër-ip, alma ël-ip, tamaq ye-p, öy-ge qayt-tim
1sg shop-DAT go-CVB, apple buy-CVB, meal eat-CVB, home-DAT return-PRES.PST-1sg
"I went to the shops and bought some apples, I ate a meal, then went back home."

The tense and person of all the verbs are indicated by the inflection of the final verb.

==== Aspect Infixes ====
Aspect infixes derive from aspect auxiliary verbs merging with verbs in the adverbial form and undergoing sound change.

Infix	Description	Example	Translation
-(I)wat-	Indicates continuity.	ئويناۋاتىدۇ oyna-wat-idu	"they are playing"
-(y)Ala-	Indicates ability or possibility.	يازالايمەن yaz-ala-y-men	"I can write"
-(i)wer-	Indicates non-restriction.		
-(I)wet-	Indicates intensification and incisiveness.	ئىچىۋېتەيلى ich-iwët-eyli	"let's drink!" (n.b. -eyli indicates optative/"let's" here)
-(I)wal-	Indicates the aspect of being directed towards the subject.		

=== Verb Formation ===
Verbs themselves can be word stems unto themselves, or be formed through compounding or verb-derivation suffixes.

==== Root Verbs ====
Some examples of root verbs include:

ماڭ
mang
"to walk"

كۈل
kül
"to laugh"

They cannot be broken down into any further morphemes.

==== Derived Verbs ====
A variety of verb-formation suffixes can be attached to various words (ranging from nouns and adjectives to other verbs) to form verbs. Many of these suffixes use harmonic rules/archiphonemes earlier described.

Suffix	Attached to	Description	Example	Translation
-lA	certain nouns	Indicates the sense of causing/having an object turn into/take on qualities possessed by the base noun.	گۈللە gül-le	to flourish lit. "to become like a flower"
-lA	nouns indicating measuring implements	Indicates the sense of measuring with said implement.	جىڭلا jing-la	to weigh with scales
-lA	certain adjectives	Indicates the sense of causing/having an object take on qualities indicated by the base adjective.	ياخشىلا yaxshi-la	to improve lit. "to make good"
-lAsh	certain nouns	Indicates the sense of producing the object expressed by the noun, or generally occurring on the basis of that object.	پاراڭلاش parang-lash	to chat lit. "to make talk"
-lAsh	certain adjectives	Indicates the sense of acquiring the qualities expressed by the adjective.	ئېغىرلاش eghir-lash	to become heavy
-lAn	certain nouns	Indicates the sense of acquiring/possessing the noun, or displaying it.	غەزەپلەن ghezep-len	to become angry
-lAn	adjectives indicating absence or lack	Indicates feeling/displaying the quality expressed by the adjective.	ئۈمىدسىزلەن ümidsiz-len	to be pessimistic
-A	specific nouns and certain adjectives	Bringing/causing an object/quality to exist/appear.	تۈزە tüz-e	to arrange/tidy lit. "to bring straightness into existence"
-sirA	certain nouns	Expresses that the object indicated by the noun decreases or is needed.	قانسىرا qan-sira	to bleed lit. "to decrease in blood"
-(A)y	certain nouns and certain adjectives	Indicates acquiring the quality/object expressed by the base word.	قاراي qara-y	to blacken/darken
-(A)r	certain adjectives	Indicates acquiring the quality expressed by the base word.	قىسقار qisqa-r	to become short
-i	certain adjectives	Indicates acquiring/possessing the quality expressed by the base word.	تىنچى tinch-i	to quieten down lit. "to acquire/possess peace"
-dA	specific nouns	Varied meanings.	ئىزدە iz-de	to search (iz = trace)
-(i)shtUr	certain verb stems	Indicates doing the verb with minimal effort, or revising it.	تۈزەشتۈر tüze-shtür	to tidy up, straighten out

There are many other highly unproductive suffixes without many examples.

==== Compound Verbs ====
These are verbs made up of two words that have merged into one inseparable word, phonetically and semantically, and express a singular lexical meaning. For example:

قارشى ئال
qarshi al
"to welcome"

== Verbal substantives ==
=== Participles ===
There are three groups of participles.

Formation of Uyghur participles
	formation	notes
Perfect participle	-GAn	
Continuous participle	-(I)watqan	
Continuous participle	-(I)p AUX-GAn	Auxiliary verbs being yat, tur, oltur, and yür
Continuous participle	-GAn	Only with the verbs yat, tur, oltur, and yür
Imperfect participle	-Ydighan	
Imperfect participle	-(A)r	
Imperfect participle	-mAs	negative form

==== The perfect participle ====
The Perfect Participle displays the action expressed by itself as a quality that has come into existence (i.e. has been completed).

كەلگەن مېھمان
kel-gen mëhman
arrive-PCP.PST guest
"a guest who has arrived"

==== The continuous participle ====
The Continuous Participle displays as a quality the continuous state or action expressed by itself.

يازىلىۋاتقان خەت
yazil-iwatqan xet
write-PCP.CONT letter
"a letter which is being written"

==== The imperfect participle ====
The Imperfect Participle displays the action expressed by itself as a quality which is habitually expressed or will be expressed later, i.e. which has not been completed.

يازالمايدىغان خەت
yazil-ma-ydighan xet
write-NEG-PCP.IMP letter
"a letter which cannot be written"

=== Gerunds ===
There are seven types of gerund (also called verbal nouns).

Formation of Uyghur gerunds
	formation	notes
-sh gerund	-(I)sh	
-maq gerund	-mAK	
-ghu gerund	-GU	
perfect gerund	-GAn-POSS	POSS indicating a possessive suffix
perfect gerund	-GAnliK	
continuous gerund	-continuous participle-POSS	
continuous gerund	-continuous participle-liK	
imperfect gerund	-imperfect participle-POSS	
imperfect gerund	-imperfect participle-liK	
agent gerund	-GUchi	

==== The -sh gerund ====
The -sh gerund expresses as an obiect an action that is neutral with respect to state. It functions as a noun in the sentence.

ئۇ ئەتىگەندە گىمناستىكا ئويناشنى ياخشى كۆرىدۇ
u etigen-de gimnastika oyna-sh-ni yaxshi kör-idu
he morning-DAT gymnastics do-GER-ACC good see-IMPERF.3sg
"he likes to do gymnastics in the morning"

There are also many special cases this gerund can be used in.

- When used as the subject of a sentence that has its predicate expressed by kërek, lazim, and shert, it indicates the requirement for the action expressed by the gerund to be carried out as well as possible.
- When used as the subject of a sentence that has its predicate expressed by mumkin it indicates an estimation about the occurrence of the action.
- When used in the dative and combined with the verb toghra kelmek it indicates the need for the action to be carried out.
- When used in the dative or combined with the postposition bilen it functions as an adverbial of time, and indicates an action coming into act immediately/soon after the gerund.
- When combined with bilen it can also indicate an action performed as a means of carrying out another action.
- When combined with bilen qalmay it indicates that the subject is not confined solely to the action indicated by the gerund, but also carries out another action.
- When used in the dative (independently) it can indicate an adverbial modifier of direction for some verbs, or a modifier of permission with the verb bol.
- When in the ablative case as a modifier for the word meqset it indicates an action without implication.
- When combined with the posposition üchün it functions as an adverbial modifier of purpose with any verb.
- When in the accusative and in front of a simple past/imperfect present form of the same verb, it turns it into the predicate of a subordinate non-impeding objection clause. (i.e. bërishni baridu - despite my having gone)
- When in the plural form it basically indicates that the action (i) happens in many places or (ii) is repeated on many occasions. or (iii) possesses a representative character.

=== Adverbials ===
There are seven types of adverbial.

	formation	notes
Limitation and contrast	-GUche	
Purpose and elapsed time	-Gili	
Causative adverbial	-GAchA	
Concurrence adverbial	-GAch	
Extension/prolongation	-GAnsëri	
Associative adverbial 1	-A/y	
Associative adverbial 2	-(I)p	
