= Torka =

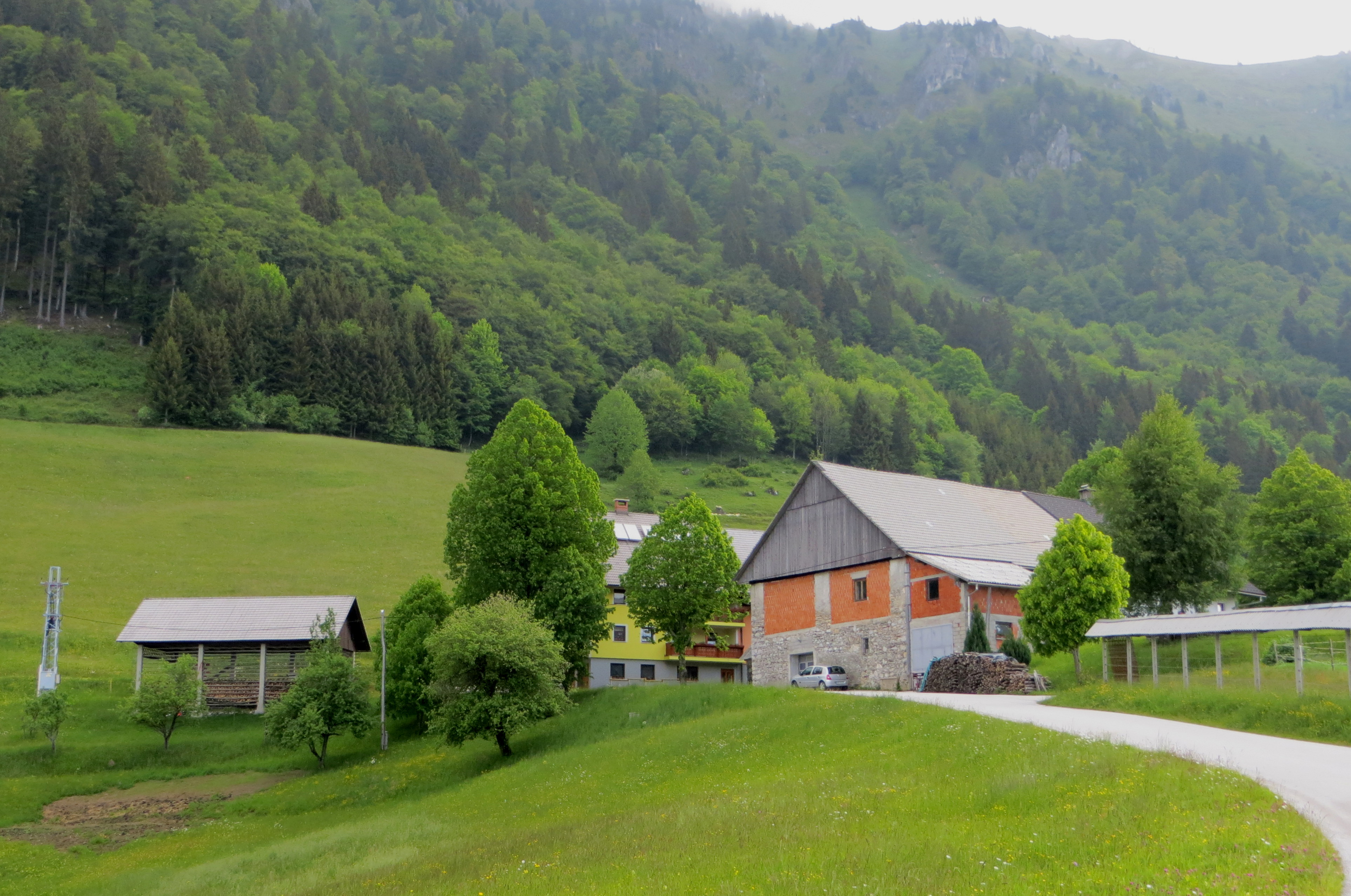

- Location in Slovenia
- Coordinates: 46°13′50.2″N 14°4′50.42″E
- Country: Slovenia
- Traditional Region: Upper Carniola
- Statistical region: Upper Carniola
- Municipality: Železniki

Area
  - Total: 1.806 km^{2} (0.697 sq mi)
- Elevation: 1,160.3 m (3,807 ft)

Population (2026)
  - Total: 5
  - Density: 3/km^{2} (7.8/sq mi)

Torka (pronounced [ˈtoːɾka]) is a small high-elevation settlement in the Municipality of Železniki in the Upper Carniola region of Slovenia. It no longer has any permanent residents. In January 2026, the population was 5.

== Name ==
Torka was attested in historical sources in 1501 as Am Thorekh. The name is believed to be a compound of German origin, from Middle High German tor 'gate' + egge 'hill, peak', thus meaning 'mountain gate' and referring to access through the village to the Ratitovec Ridge.
