= Ratitovec =

Mountain in Slovenia

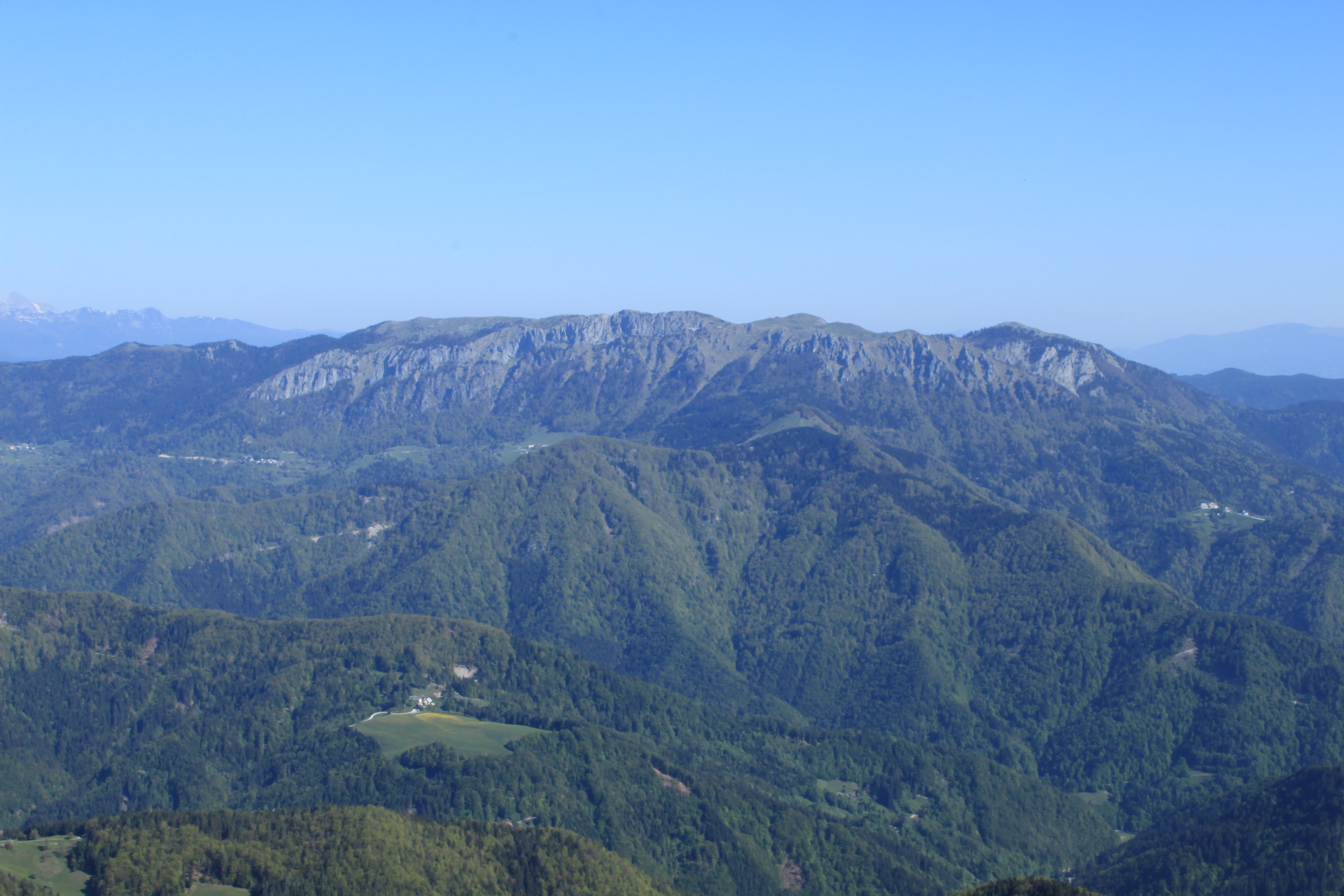

Highest point
- Elevation: 1,678 m (5,505 ft)
- Coordinates: 46°14′20.364″N 14°4′27.840″E

Geography
- Location within Slovenia
- Location: Slovenia
- Parent range: Škofja Loka Hills

Ratitovec is a mountain ridge in the Julian Alps in Slovenia. The highest peak on the ridge is Mount Altemaver (1,679 meters or 5,509 feet). The Krek Lodge (Slovene: Krekova koča) stands on the ridge.

== Name ==
Ratitovec was attested in historical sources as Boscana in AD 973 and as Petschana in 1763–87 (both corresponding to the Pečana mountain pasture on the north slope of the ridge), as well as Ratitovecz and Rakitovez in the second half of the eighteenth century. The name Ratitovec developed from Rakitovec via assimilation at a distance and is based on the common noun rakita 'eared willow', referring to the local vegetation.

== Starting points and routes ==
- From Soriška planina, 3h
- From the village of Prtovč, 2h
- From the village of Torka via Povden, 1½h
- From Bitenjska planina on Jelovica 2½h
- From Planina pečana, 1h
