= Assimilation (phonology) =

Phenomenon in linguistics

In phonology, assimilation is a sound change in which some phonemes (typically consonants or vowels) change to become more similar to other nearby sounds. This process is common across languages and can happen within a word or between words. For example, in English the plural suffix -s alternates voicing depending on the preceding consonant: pots /pɒts/ versus pods /pɒdz/. (Note: This specific type of assimilation results in allomorphs.)

Assimilation can be categorized by both its direction and its distance. Regarding direction, sound segments typically assimilate to a following sound, known as regressive or anticipatory assimilation. They may also assimilate to a preceding one, known as progressive or perseverative assimilation. Regarding distance, assimilation most commonly occurs between immediately adjacent sounds, known as adjacent, contact, contiguous, or local assimilation. However, it may also occur between sounds that are separated by others, known as distant, long-distance, or remote assimilation. (Note: This is also sometimes referred to as assimilation at a distance.)

While assimilation occurs in normal speech environments, it is more frequent in rapid speech. For example, in handbag /ˈhændbæɡ/ the [d] is sometimes elided (omitted) in rapid speech, which causes the [n] to assimilate to [m], becoming [ˈhæmbæɡ], as [m] and [b] are both bilabial (produced with both lips) in their place of articulation. Sometimes the change is accepted as canonical, and can even become recognized in standard spelling: imprecise is pronounced with [m] (and consequently spelled with ⟨m⟩), while it is etymologically in- + precise, where in- (in the sense of not) systematically becomes im- before bilabials. (Note: This particular feature is borrowed from Latin. In the sense of in, into for words of Germanic origin, assimilation does not always occur, such as in inbound (in- + bound).)

Assimilation can be synchronic, an active process in a language at a given point in time, or diachronic, a historical sound change – for instance, cupboard, historically a compound of cup (/kʌp/) and board (/bɔːrd/), is now pronounced /ˈkʌbərd/, with the original /ˈkʌpbɔːrd/ almost never used. (Note: This is the case even in slow, highly-articulated speech; excepting some unlearned speakers, as well as Philippine English and similar dialects that pronounce it ~/ˈkʌpbɔːrd/.)

A related process, coarticulation, includes changes like vowels nasalizing (taking on a nasal sound) before nasal consonants (/n, m, ŋ/) due to premature soft palate (velum) lowering, or /b/ labializing (lips rounding) as in boot ([bʷuːt̚]) or ball [bʷɔːɫ] in some accents. This article describes both processes under the term assimilation.

== Concept ==
The physiological or psychological mechanisms of coarticulation are unknown, and coarticulation is often loosely referred to as a segment being "triggered" by an assimilatory change in another segment. In assimilation, the phonological patterning of the language, discourse styles and accent are some of the factors contributing to changes observed.

Assimilation are usually categorized by two properties: assimilations may be

- between adjacent segments; or
- between segments separated by one or more intervening segments,

and they may be

- changes made in reference to a preceding segment; or
- changes made in reference to a following segment,

resulting in four possible configurations.

Although all four occur, changes in regard to a following adjacent segment account for most assimilatory changes and virtually all of the regular ones. Similarly, assimilations to an adjacent segment are far more frequent than assimilations to a nonadjacent one. Those radical asymmetries might contain hints about the mechanisms involved, but they are not obvious.

If a sound changes with reference to a following segment, it is traditionally called "regressive assimilation". Changes with reference to a preceding segment are traditionally called "progressive". Many people find those terms confusing, as they may seem to indicate the opposite of the intended meaning. Accordingly, a variety of alternative terms have arisen, not all of which avoid the problem of the traditional terms. Regressive assimilation is also known as right-to-left, leading, or anticipatory assimilation. Progressive assimilation is also known as left-to-right, preseveratory, preservative, lagging, or lag assimilation. The terms anticipatory and lag are used here.

Occasionally, two sounds (invariably adjacent) may influence each other in reciprocal assimilation. When such a change results in a single segment with some of the features of both components, it is known as coalescence or fusion.

Assimilation occurs in two different types: complete assimilation, in which the sound affected by assimilation becomes exactly the same as the sound causing assimilation, and partial assimilation, in which the sound becomes the same in one or more features but remains different in other features, such as place of articulation. Tonal languages may exhibit tone assimilation; also see tone sandhi. Sign languages also exhibit assimilation when the characteristics of neighbouring cheremes may be mixed.

== Examples ==
=== Anticipatory assimilation to an adjacent segment ===
Anticipatory assimilation to an adjacent segment is the most common type of assimilation by far and typically has the character of a conditioned sound change: it applies to all or part of the lexicon.

For example, in English, the place of articulation of nasals assimilates to that of a following stop (handkerchief is pronounced [hæŋkɚtʃif], handbag in rapid speech is pronounced [hæmbæɡ]).

In Italian, voiceless stops assimilated historically to a following /t/:

- Latin octo "eight" > It. otto
- Latin lectus "bed" > letto
- Latin subtus – pronounced suptus "under" > sotto

Italian otto, letto and sotto are examples of historical restructuring: otto and letto no longer contain /kt/ pronounced [tt], and sotto is no longer the structure /bt/ subject to the partial assimilation of devoicing of /b/ and full assimilation to produce [tt]. Over time, phonetic [tt] as a frequent assimilation of /kt/ and /bt/ was rather reinterpreted as reflecting /tt/. The structural sequence /kt/ is now all but absent in Italian since all items in popular speech have undergone the same restructuring: /kt/ > /tt/. On the rare occasion that Italian /kt/ is encountered, however, the same assimilation that triggered the restructuring can occur at the phonetic level. For example, the medical term ictus 'stroke', a relatively recent direct borrowing from Latin, is usually pronounced [ˈiktus] in deliberate speech, but [ˈittus] is frequent in more casual registers.

- Latin ictus > Italian ictus, pronounced either [ˈiktus] or [ˈittus]

==== Affrication in English ====
There has been a notable change recognized across a variety of English dialects regarding the pronunciation of the /tr/ and /dr/ consonant clusters. Starting around the mid-20th century, the alveolar stop in /tr, dr/ has slowly been replaced by a post-alveolar affricate instead, resulting in the all-postalveolar consonant clusters [tʃɹ] and [dʒɹ]. This phenomenon also occurs in /str/, resulting in the all-postalveolar consonant cluster [ʃtʃɹ]. The affrication of /tr, dr/ has been seen in American English, British English, Australian English, and New Zealand English. It is suspected that this change has occurred due to assimilation.

One of the first papers that discussed the affrication of /tr, dr/ is "Pre-School Children's Knowledge of English Phonology" by Charles Read, published in 1971. The study discussed in the paper focuses on how children in pre-school analyze the phonetic aspect of language to determine the proper spelling of English words. Read noticed that many of the children involved in the study misspelled words that began with /tr, dr/, spelling words like troubles and dragon as "chribls" and "jragin" respectively. In a different test, Read also found that many of the children believed that words like train and chicken started with /tʃ/.

=== Anticipatory assimilation at a distance ===
For consonants, anticipatory assimilation at a distance is rare and usually a non-systematic irregular development in the history of a specific word.

- Standard Slovene Jevnica (a toponym) > Slovene dialect Vevnica
- Slovene Rakitovec > Ratitovec (a mountain ridge)

However, the diverse and common assimilations known as umlaut, in which the phonetics of a vowel are influenced by the phonetics of a vowel in a following syllable, are common and in the nature of sound laws. Such changes abound in the histories of Germanic languages, Romance, Insular Celtic, Albanian, and many other languages.

For example, in the history of English, a back vowel became front if a high front vowel or semivowel (*i, ī, j) was in the following syllable, and a front vowel became higher unless it was already high:

- Proto-Germanic *mūsiz "mice" > Old English mýs /myːs/ > Modern English mice
- PGmc *batizōn "better" > OE bettre
- PGmc *fōtiz "feet" > OE fét > ME feet

On the other hand, Proto-Germanic *i and *u became e, o respectively before *a in the following syllable (Germanic a-mutation) although that had happened significantly earlier:

- PGmc *wurdą > OE word
- PGmc *nestaz > OE nest

Another example of a regular change is the sibilant assimilation of Sanskrit in which if there were two different sibilants as the onset of successive syllables, a plain /s/ was always replaced by the palatal /ɕ/:

- Proto-Indo-European *smeḱru- "beard" > Skt. śmaśru-
- PIE *ḱoso- "gray" > Skt. śaśa- "rabbit"
- PIE *sweḱru- "husband's mother' > Skt. śvaśrū-

=== Lag assimilation to an adjacent segment ===
Lag assimilation to an adjacent segment is tolerably common and often has the nature of a sound law.

Proto-Indo-European *-ln- becomes *-ll- in both Germanic and Italic: *ḱl̥nis "hill" > PreLat. *kolnis > Lat. collis; > PGmc *hulliz > OE hyll /hyll/ > hill. The enclitic form of English is elides the vowel and becomes voiceless adjacent to a word-final voiceless nonsibilant: it is [ɪtɪz], that is [ðætɪz] > it's [ɪts], that's [ðæts].

In Polish, /v/ regularly becomes /f/ after a voiceless obstruent:

- kwiat 'flower', pronounced [kfjat], instead of [kvjat]
- twarz 'face', pronounced [tfaʂ], instead of [tvaʂ]

That does not apply across word boundaries and so the placename Grodzisk Wielkopolski is pronounced [ˈɡrɔdʑizɡ vjɛlkɔˈpɔlskʲi], not [ˈɡrɔdʑisk fjɛlkɔˈpɔlskʲi]. In that context, /v/ patterns with other voiced obstruents.

Because of a similar process, Proto-Indo-Iranian *ćw became sp in Avestan: Old Avestan aspa 'horse' corresponds to Sanskrit aśva

=== Lag assimilation at a distance ===
Lag assimilation at a distance is rare and usually sporadic (except when part of a broader change, as for the Sanskrit śaśa- example, above): Greek leirion > Lat. līlium "lily".

In vowel harmony, a vowel's phonetic features are often influenced by those of a preceding vowel. For example, most Finnish case markers come in two forms, with /ɑ/ (written a) and /æ/ (written ä), depending on whether the preceding vowel is back or front. However, it is difficult to know where and how in the history of Finnish an actual assimilatory change took place. The distribution of pairs of endings in Finnish is not the operation of an assimilatory innovation, but it is probably the outbirth of such an innovation long ago.

In the opposite direction, in umlaut, a vowel is modified to conform more closely to the vowel in the next syllable.

=== Coalescence (fusion) ===
Coalescence is a phonological situation whereby adjacent sounds are replaced by a single sound that shares the features of the two originally adjacent sounds. In other words, coalescence is a type of assimilation whereby two sounds fuse to become one, and the fused sound shares similar characteristics with the two fused sounds. Some examples in English include 'don’t you' -> /dəʊnt ju/ -> [dəʊntʃu]. In that instance, /t/ and /j/ have fused to [tʃ]. /tʃ/ is a palato-alveolar sound; its palatal feature is derived from /j/ while its alveolar is from /t/. Another English example is ‘would you’ -> /wʊd ju/ -> [wʊdʒu]. There are examples in other languages, such as Chumburung where /ɪ̀wú ɪ̀sá/ -> /ɪ̀wúɪ̀sá/ becomes [ɪ̀wɪ́sá] - ‘three horns’. In this case, /ɪ/ is retained in the coalescence and the rising tone on /u/ appears on the coalesced sound.

There are two major types of coalescence: reductive and unreductive. Reductive coalescence is the type of coalescence in which sound segments are reduced after fusion is made. For example, in Xhosa, /i - lˈalaini/ becomes /e - lˈoleni/ (side). The /a-i/ segment in the first form reduces to /e/. On the other hand, non-reductive coalescence have no reduction in sound segments even though there is evidence of fusion. For example, in Shona, [v_á] [tengesa] (they sell) becomes [ku] [téngésá] (to sell). There, the original sound does not reduce with respect to sound segments even though the rising tone on the vowels in the coalesced form indicates the fusion of /á/ to the vowels.

=== Harmony ===
Harmony is a type of phonological assimilation, and includes consonant harmony, vowel harmony, and vowel–consonant harmony. Harmony may operate at a distance, with segments agreeing while apparently unaffected segments intervene, or continuously across a string of segments; intervening segments may also be blocking segments, which stop harmony, or transparent segments, which appear to be skipped without preventing harmony from extending further.

Different types of harmony systems appear to operate differently; e.g., consonant harmony appears to work differently from vowel and vowel–consonant harmony. Analyses of harmony have evolved from earlier autosegmental, tier-based approaches toward correspondence-based and Optimality theory approaches, with increasing attention also given to functional explanations of harmony patterns.

== See also ==
- Assibilation
- Phonological history of English consonant clusters
- Co-articulated consonant
- Consonant harmony
- Crasis
- Deletion (phonology)
- Dissimilation
- Epenthesis
- Labialization
- Palatalization
- Pharyngealization
- Secondary articulation
- Velarization
