= Vowel–consonant harmony =

Linguistic concept

Vowel–consonant harmony, or consonant–vowel harmony, is a type of phonological harmony, a "long-distance" assimilation akin to the similar assimilatory process involving vowels, i.e. vowel harmony and the as similar assimilatory process involving consonants, i.e. consonant harmony.

== Types ==
=== Nasal ===
A common process is a local harmony known as nasal harmony, in which all sounds in a given domain agree in nasality. Epena Pedee involves nasal vowels being the trigger, the direction being progressive and affecting glottals, vowels, glides, and liquids within the domain, with obstruents and the alveolar trill being the blockers. Idiosyncrasies include plosives becoming prenasalized when blocking the harmony and onset plosives becoming their corresponding nasal consonants.

Ewe has nasal harmony, in which nasal consonants appear only before nasal vowels; it has been argued instead that nasals are the underlying form and become denasalized before oral vowels. There is a homorganic syllabic nasal that some authors treat as a vowel.

Capanahua utilizes a nasal harmony system where nasals are the trigger, and the direction is right-to-left, with vowels, glides, and glottals being affected, and liquids and obstruents serving as the blockers.

Tuyuca specializes in a nasal harmony system that is bidirectional, with no blockers at all, and voiceless obstruents being transparent.

Guarani uses nasal harmony with nasal vowels being the trigger, and the harmony being bidirectional, though voiced stops are blockers. Certain affixes have alternative forms according to whether the root includes a nasal (vowel or consonant) or not. For example, the reflexive prefix is realized as oral je- before an oral stem like juka "kill", but as nasal ñe- before a nasal stem like nupã "hit". The ã makes the stem nasal.

Ndrumbea has nasal harmony.

Hup has nasal harmony.

=== Palatal ===
Harari uses a non-local, or distant harmony system known as palatalization harmony, where the rightmost coronal consonant, aside from [r], is palatalized by [i] in the second-person feminine singular non-perfective. The effect of [i] on one consonant would affect another consonant, and so forth, via a domino effect.

=== Retroflex ===
Sanskrit, known for its retroflex consonants compared to the languages that started using its script, uses a system known as retroflex harmony, with all the sounds in a given domain agreeing in retroflexion. The non-lateral retroflex continuants are the triggers, with intervening coronals being the blockers. Though it would seem like consonant harmony, research suggests that the tongue would remain in retroflex position, affecting the vowels as well until obstacles are met.

Mpakwithi used a retroflex harmony system that was right-to-left and limited to the vowels, despite the retroflex rhotic being the trigger.

=== Emphatic ===
Egyptian Arabic uses emphatic harmony, where all sounds in a given domain agree in emphaticness, with emphatic consonants being limited to pharyngealized or uvularized consonants. The pharyngealized alveolars of the Egyptian dialect and a pharyngealized [ɑˤ] are the triggers, with all sounds being pharyngealized if [ɑˤ] is in a word, and the pharyngealized alveolars spreading the harmony in a bidirectional manner. High front vowels and consonants would be the blockers, and include [ɪ], [iː], [eː], and [ʒ].

The Southern Palestinian dialect involves the emphatic consonants in general (albeit limited to those within the dialect's phonology) being the triggers, and the spreading being bidirectional, with [i], [j], [ʃ], and [dʒ] being the blockers.

=== Faucal ===
Coeur d'Alene utilizes a non-local, or distant harmony system known as faucal harmony, in which preceding faucals are the triggers, faucals consisting of the uvular and pharyngeal consonants: /q, qʼ, qʷ, qʷʼ, ʕ, ʕˀ, ʕʷ, ʕʷˀ/. They do so by retracting [i] to [ɛ] and [ɛ] to [ɑ]. The effect of one vowel being altered affects another vowel. This system is both local and distant, with intervening consonants unaffected.

Xibe uses a faucal harmony system with vowels altering consonants compared to Coeur d'Alene, with velars becoming uvulars in suffixes if non-high vowels appear in preceding stems.

== See also ==
- Consonant harmony
- Vowel harmony

== Bibliography ==
- Rose, Sharon; Walker, Rachel (2011). "Harmony Systems". The Handbook of Phonological Theory (2nd ed.). John Wiley & Sons. pp. 240–290. doi:10.1002/9781444343069.ch8. ISBN 978-1-4051-5768-1.
- Ryan, Kevin (2017). "Attenuated Spreading in Sanskrit Retroflex Harmony". Linguistic Inquiry. 48 (2): 299–340. doi:10.1162/LING_a_00244. ISSN 0024-3892.
- Shahin, Kimary N. (2003). Postvelar Harmony. Current Issues in Linguistic Theory. Vol. 225. Amsterdam: John Benjamins Publishing Company. doi:10.1075/cilt.225. ISBN 978-90-272-4733-9.
- Watson, Janet C. E. (April 1999), The Directionality of Emphasis Spread in Arabic – via ResearchGate
- Youseef, Islam (January 2007), Dorsal Harmony in Cairene Arabic – via ResearchGate
