= Consonant harmony =

Phonological assimilation

Consonant harmony is a type of phonological harmony, a "long-distance" assimilation of consonants akin to the assimilatory process involving vowels in vowel harmony, or both in vowel–consonant harmony.

== Types ==
=== Coronal ===
One of the more common harmony processes is coronal harmony, which affects coronal fricatives, such as s and sh. Then, all coronal fricatives belong to the [+anterior] class (s-like sounds) or the [−anterior] class (sh-like sounds). Such patterns are found in Athabaskan languages such as e.g. Navajo, Tahltan, and Western Apache. In Tahltan, Shaw showed that coronal harmony affects three coronal fricatives, s, sh and the interdental th. The following examples are given by de Reuse: in Western Apache, the verbal prefix si- is an alveolar fricative, as in the following forms:

- siką̄ą̄ "a container and its contents are in position"
- sitłēēd "mushy matter is in position"
- siyį̄į̄ "a load/pack/burden is in position"
- sinéʼ "three or more flexible objects are in position"
- siłāā "a slender flexible object is in position"
- siʼą̄ą̄ "a solid roundish object is in position"
- sitsooz "a flat flexible object is in position"
- siziid "liquid matter is in position"

However, when the prefix si- occurs before a verb stem that contains a postalveolar affricate, the si- surfaces as the post-alveolar shi-:

- shijaa "three or more solid rigid inanimate objects are in position"

Thus, all sibilant obstruents (fricatives and affricates) in these languages are divided into two groups, +anterior (s, ts, dz) and -anterior (sh, ch, j). In Navajo, as in most languages with consonant harmony, there is a constraint on the shape of roots (a well-formedness constraint) that is identical to the harmony process. All roots with sibilant affricates or fricatives have the same value for anteriority.

There are two aspects of the process in Navajo. Firstly, morphemes that participate are domain-specific, only the last two domains are affected (conjunct + stem). Verbal morphemes from the outer or 'disjunct' domain are not affected by the process: the process is morphologically conditioned. Secondly, the lateral affricate and fricative (dl, tł and ł) appear with both values.

A different example of coronal harmony, sometimes referred to as NATI rule, occurs in Sanskrit, where [n] is retroflexed to [ɳ] if it is preceded by a retroflex continuant, mainly [ɽ] and [ʂ], in the same word, even at a distance. The retroflexion spreads from left to right affecting any coronal nasal until the word boundary is reached. This phenomenon, however, is blocked whenever a coronal plosive is placed between [ɽ]/[ʂ] and [n]. For instance, in the noun ब्राह्मण brāhmaṇa "Brahmin priest" (derived from the root *bṛh "to make strong" + the suffix -man- + the thematic vowel -a), the original coronal [n] (IAST: n) of the action noun suffix -man changes to a retroflex [ɳ] (IAST: ṇ) due to consonant harmony triggered by [ɽ] (IAST: r). On the other hand, in the word अर्चन arcana "homage, praising" (from *ṛc "to praise" + -man- + -a) consonant harmony is prevented by the coronal stop [t͡ʃ] (IAST: c) which blocks the assimilation.

=== Pharyngeal ===
Old Chinese probably had some constraint governing the shape of disyllables. According to modern reconstructions of Old Chinese phonology, type A and B syllables almost never co-occur in a disyllabic word. In the reconstruction of Old Chinese phonology proposed by Baxter & Sagart (2014), this type A vs. type B distinction can be traced back to the presence or the absence of pharyngealization respectively, cf. 納 nà < OC *nˤup "to bring into" (type A) and 入 rù < OC *nup "to enter" (type B) only differing by the [±pharyngeal] trait of the initial consonant. Onsets of type B syllables, lacking of pharyngealization, are subject to palatalization in Middle Chinese (indicated by a palatal medial -j- in Baxter's notation), while type A pharyngealized onsets failed to palatalize. In many ancient disyllabic words type A and type B characters do not mix, there are almost solely bisyllabic morphemes either with type A syllables, such as:

- 蝴蝶 húdié < MC hu dep < OC *gˤa lˤep "butterfly"
- 邂逅 xièhòu < MC hɛH huwH < OC *gˤre-s gˤro-s "carefree"
- 窈窕 yǎotiǎo < MC ʔewX dewX < OC *ʔˤewʔ lˤewʔ "beautiful and gentle (said of a woman)"

or with type B syllables, including:

- 麒麟 qílín < MC gi lin < OC *gə rən "Qilin" (a mythical beast)
- 蟋蟀 xīshuài < MC srit srwit < OC *srit srut "cricket"
- 參差 cēncī < MC tsrhim tsrhje < OC *tsʰrum tsʰraj "uneven, irregular"

Such pattern seems to suggest the existence of some sort of pharyngeal harmony in Old Chinese. However, there are notable, though infrequent, exceptions to this tendency, manifesting in ancient compounds that are generally hard to analyze. From this list the following word is often mentioned:

- 鳳凰 fènghuáng < MC bjuwngH hwang < OC *N-prəm-s ɢʷˤaŋ "Chinese phoenix, fabulous bird" (Note: Possibly an old and opaque compound from 風皇 fēng huáng < MC pjuwng hwang < OC *prəm ɢʷˤaŋ "sovereign of the winds" with affixes (Miyake 2015).)

=== Sibilant ===
Sibilant harmony can be observed in Moroccan Arabic and some southern dialects of Algerian Arabic:

- جوج žūž as opposed to زوج zūž ("two")
- شمش šəmš as opposed to شمس šəms ("sun")

The Chumashan languages are well known for their regressive sibilant harmony.

=== Liquid ===
Various Austronesian languages have consonant harmony among the liquid consonants, with [r] assimilating at a distance to [l] or vice versa.

=== Voicing ===
Some Finnish speakers find it hard to pronounce both 'b' and 'p' in loanwords (pubi, pub) and so they voice (bubi) or devoice (pupi) the entire word. However, the distinction between the consonants is not native to Finnish. (Note: Finnish has one native voiced stop, /d/, but it is not subject to similar behavior: tädit ("aunts"). That may be because the distinction between /t̪/ and /d/ involves the place of articulation (dental vs. alveolar) in addition to voice.) Native Finnish words do not use /b/.

In the Ngeté-Herdé language of Cameroon, voicing of word-medial obstruents is strongly influenced by voicing of the word-initial consonant. Generally, all obstruents in a word are either voiced or voiceless.

== See also ==
- Vowel harmony
- Dissimilation (phonology)
- Fusion (phonetics)
- Consonant gradation
- Vowel-consonant harmony

== Bibliography ==
- Applegate, Richard Brian (1972). Ineseño Chumash Grammar (PhD dissertation). University of California, Berkeley.
- Baxter, William H.; Sagart, Laurent (2014). Old Chinese: A New Reconstruction. New York: Oxford University Press. doi:10.1093/acprof:oso/9780199945375.001.0001. ISBN 978-0-19-994537-5.
- Campbell, Lyle (1997). American Indian Languages: The Historical Linguistics of Native America. Oxford Studies in Anthropological Linguistics. Vol. 4. New York: Oxford University Press. doi:10.1093/oso/9780195094275.001.0001. ISBN 978-0-19-509427-5.
- Guerrero, Jairo (2015). "Preliminary notes on the current Arabic dialect of Oran (Western Algeria)". Romano Arabica 15.
- McDonough, Joyce (2003). The Navajo Sound System. Studies in Natural Language and Linguistic Theory. Vol. 55. Dordrecht: Kluwer Academic Publishers. doi:10.1007/978-94-010-0207-3. ISBN 978-1-4020-1352-2.
- Miyake, Marc (2015-11-05). Old Chinese Type A/Type B in Areal Perspective. Recent Advances in Old Chinese Phonology: Beyond Boundaries. British Museum.
- de Reuse, Willem J. (2006). A Practical Grammar of the San Carlos Apache Language. LINCOM Studies in Native American Linguistics. Vol. 51. Munich: LINCOM Europa. ISBN 978-3-89586-861-0.
- Rose, Sharon; Walker, Rachel (2004). "A Typology of Consonant Agreement as Correspondence". Language. 80 (3): 475–531. doi:10.1353/lan.2004.0144.
- Ryan, Kevin M. (2017). "Attenuated Spreading in Sanskrit Retroflex Harmony". Linguistic Inquiry. 48 (2): 299–340. doi:10.1162/ling_a_00244. eISSN 1530-9150. ISSN 0024-3892.
- Sachnine, M (1982). Le Lame: Un parler zime du Nord-Cameroun (langue tchadique): Phonologie - Grammaire. Societe d'Etudes Linguistiques et Anthropologiques de France: Langues et Cultures Africaines, 1. With l'Agence de Cooperation Culturelle et Technique.
- Shaw, Patricia A. (1991). "Consonant Harmony Systems: The Special Status of Coronal Harmony". In Paradis, Carole; Prunet, Jean-François (eds.). The Special Status of Coronals: Internal and External Evidence. Phonetics and Phonology. Vol. 2. Academic Press. pp. 125–157. doi:10.1016/B978-0-12-544966-3.50013-0. ISBN 978-0-12-544966-3.
- Young, Robert W.; Morgan, William (1987). The Navajo Language: A Grammar and Colloquial Dictionary (Revised ed.). Albuquerque: University of New Mexico Press. ISBN 978-0-8263-1014-9.
