= Vowel harmony =

Sound change in vowels

In phonology, vowel harmony is a phonological process in which vowels assimilate ("harmonize") to share certain distinctive features. Vowel harmony is often confined to the domain of a phonological word, but may extend across word boundaries in certain languages.

Generally, one vowel will trigger a shift in other vowels within the domain, such that the affected vowels match the relevant feature of the trigger vowel. Intervening segments are common between affected vowels, meaning that the vowels do not need to be next to each other for this change to apply. This is classified as a "long-distance" type of assimilation. Common phonological features that define the natural classes of vowels involved in vowel harmony include vowel backness, vowel height, nasalization, roundedness, and advanced and retracted tongue root.

Certain authors and articles use the term vowel harmony to refer to progressive (beginning-to-end) vowel assimilation, and use umlaut to refer to regressive assimilation. The term umlaut is also used in a different sense to refer to a type of vowel gradation, as well as the diacritic that often marks such changes. Metaphony is often used synonymously with vowel harmony, but is typically used to describe historical sound changes. This article uses the term "vowel harmony" to refer to both progressive and regressive assimilatory processes.

Vowel harmony is found in many agglutinative languages. The given domain of vowel harmony taking effect often spans across morpheme boundaries, and suffixes and prefixes will usually follow vowel harmony rules. Vowel harmony is also considered an areal feature in some parts of the world, especially Northern and Central Asia among the Turkic, Mongolic, and Tungusic language families, as well as other languages in contact with languages from the aforementioned families.

== "Long-distance" ==
Vowel harmony processes are "long-distance" in the sense that the assimilation involves sounds that are separated by intervening segments (usually consonant segments). In other words, harmony refers to the assimilation of sounds that are not adjacent to each other. For example, a vowel at the beginning of a word can trigger assimilation in a vowel at the end of a word. The assimilation occurs across the entire word in many languages. This is represented schematically in the following diagram:

before assimilation		after assimilation
V_{a}CV_{b}CV_{b}C	→	V_{a}CV_{a}CV_{a}C	(V_{a} = type-a vowel, V_{b} = type-b vowel, C = consonant)

In the diagram above, the V_{a} (type-a vowel) causes the following V_{b} (type-b vowel) to assimilate and become the same type of vowel (and thus they become, metaphorically, "in harmony"). This property of vowel harmony to apply to non-adjacent segments has been used to argue for the autosegmental phonology framework, where vowels constitute a tier that operate independently of other segments.

The vowel that causes the vowel assimilation is frequently termed the trigger while the vowels that assimilate (or harmonize) are termed targets. When the vowel triggers lie within the root or stem of a word and the affixes contain the targets, this is called stem-controlled vowel harmony (the opposite situation is called dominant). This is fairly common among languages with vowel harmony and may be seen in the Hungarian dative suffix:

Root	Dative	Gloss
város	város-nak	'city'
öröm	öröm-nek	'joy'

The dative suffix has two different forms -nak/-nek. The -nak form appears after the root with back vowels (o and a are back vowels). The -nek form appears after the root with front vowels (ö and e are front vowels).

== Features of vowel harmony ==
Vowel harmony often involves dimensions such as:

Rose & Walker (2011)	Ko (2018)	Dimension	Value
Backness Harmony	Palatal harmony	Vowel backness	back or front, [±back]
Roundedness Harmony	Labial harmony	Roundedness	rounded or unrounded, [±round]
Height Harmony	Height harmony	Vowel height	high or low, [±high]
Tongue Root Harmony	Tongue root harmony	Advanced and retracted tongue root	advanced or retracted, [±ATR]

- Nasalization, as in Guaraní, where the presence of nasal vowels causes other vowels to become nasalized as well. There are systems in which the presence of a nasal consonant triggers vowels to become nasal, but this is technically classified as a type of vowel–consonant harmony.
- Rhoticity, like in Yurok.
- Unconventional systems, like the one in Nez Perce, that do not seem to be based on any obvious phonetic feature at first.

Some languages have more than one system of harmony. For instance, many languages of the Altaic sprachbund are proposed to have a rounding harmony superimposed over a backness harmony.

Even among languages with vowel harmony, not all vowels need to participate in the vowel conversions; these vowels are termed neutral. Neutral vowels may be opaque and block harmonic processes or they may be transparent and not affect them. Intervening consonants are also often transparent.

Languages that do have vowel harmony often allow for lexical disharmony, or words with mixed sets of vowels even when an opaque neutral vowel is not involved. Van der Hulst & van de Weijer (1995) point to two such situations: polysyllabic trigger morphemes may contain non-neutral vowels from opposite harmonic sets, and certain target morphemes simply fail to harmonize. Many loanwords exhibit disharmony, such as Turkish vakit, ('time' [from Arabic waqt]); *vakıt would have been expected. Finnish olympialaiset ('Olympic games') and sekundäärinen ('secondary') have both front and back vowels, and are pronounced accordingly in standard Finnish, but many speakers intuitively apply vowel harmony – olumpialaiset, and sekundaarinen or sekyndäärinen.

== Languages with vowel harmony ==
=== Turkic languages ===
Turkic languages inherit their systems of vowel harmony from Proto-Turkic, which already had a fully developed system. The one exception is Uzbek, which has lost its vowel harmony due to extensive Persian influence; however, its closest relative, Uyghur, has retained Turkic vowel harmony.

==== Azerbaijani ====
Azerbaijani's system of vowel harmony applies on both the front/back and rounded/unrounded dimensions.

Azerbaijani Vowel Harmony	Front		Back	
Azerbaijani Vowel Harmony	Unrounded	Rounded	Unrounded	Rounded
Vowel	e, ə, i	ö, ü	a, ı	o, u
Two form suffix (iki şəkilli şəkilçilər)	ə		a	
Four form suffix (dörd şəkilli şəkilçilər)	i	ü	ı	u

==== Tatar ====
Tatar has no neutral vowels. The vowel é is found only in loanwords. Other vowels also could be found in loanwords, but they are seen as back vowels. Tatar also has rounding harmony, but this is not represented in writing. O and ö could be written only in the first syllable, but vowels they mark could be pronounced in the place where ı and e are written.

Front	ä	e	i	ö	ü	
Back	a	ı	í	o	u	é

==== Kazakh ====
Kazakh's system of vowel harmony is primarily a front/back system, but there is also a system of rounding harmony that is not represented by the orthography.

==== Kyrgyz ====
Kyrgyz's system of vowel harmony is primarily a front/back system, but there is also a system of rounding harmony, which strongly resembles that of Kazakh.

==== Turkish ====
Turkish has a 2-dimensional vowel harmony system, where vowels are characterised by two features: [±front] and [±rounded]. There are two sets of vocal harmony systems: a simple one and a complex one. The simple one is concerned with the low vowels /e, a/ and has only the [±front] feature (/e/ front vs /a/ back). The complex one is concerned with the high vowels /i, ü, ı, u/ and has both [±front] and [±rounded] features (/i/ front unrounded vs /ü/ front rounded and ⟨ı⟩ /ɯ/ back unrounded vs /u/ back rounded). The close-mid vowels /ö, o/ are not involved in vowel harmony processes.

Turkish vowel harmony
	Front				Back			
	Unrounded		Rounded		Unrounded		Rounded	
Vowel	e /e/	i /i/	ö /ø/	ü /y/	a /a/	ı /ɯ/	o /o/	u /u/
Simple system	e				a			
Complex system	i		ü		ı		u	

===== Front/back harmony =====
Turkish has two classes of vowels – front and back. Vowel harmony dictates that words may not contain both front and back vowels. Therefore, most grammatical suffixes come in front and back forms, e.g. Türkiye'de 'in Turkey' but Almanya'da 'in Germany'.

Turkish vowel harmony examples
Nom.sg	Gen.sg.	Nom.pl	Gen.pl.	Gloss
ip	ipin	ipler	iplerin	'rope'
el	elin	eller	ellerin	'hand'
kız	kızın	kızlar	kızların	'girl'

===== Rounding harmony =====
In addition, there is a secondary rule that i and ı in suffixes tend to become ü and u respectively after rounded vowels, so certain suffixes have additional forms. This gives constructions such as Türkiye'dir 'it is Turkey', kapıdır 'it is the door', but gündür 'it is the day', karpuzdur 'it is the watermelon'.

===== Exceptions =====
Not all suffixes obey vowel harmony perfectly.

In the suffix -(i)yor, the o is invariant, while the i changes according to the preceding vowel; for example sönüyor – 'he/she/it fades'. Likewise, in the suffix -(y)ken, the e is invariant: Roma'dayken – 'When in Rome'; and so is the i in the suffix -(y)ebil: inanılabilir – 'credible'. The suffix -ki exhibits partial harmony, never taking a back vowel but allowing only the front-voweled variant -kü: dünkü – 'belonging to yesterday'; yarınki – 'belonging to tomorrow'.

Most Turkish words have vowel harmony not only for suffixes, but also internally. However, there are many exceptions.

Compound words are considered separate words with respect to vowel harmony: vowels do not have to harmonize between members of the compound (thus forms like bu|gün "this|day" = 'today' are permissible). Vowel harmony does not apply for loanwords, as in otobüs – from French 'autobus'. There are also a few native modern Turkish words with unharmonized vowels (such as anne 'mother' or kardeş 'sibling' which used to obey vowel harmony in their older forms, ana and karındaş, respectively). However, in such words, suffixes nevertheless harmonize with the final vowel; thus annesi – 'his/her mother', and voleybolcu – 'volleyballer'.

In some loanwords the final vowel is an a, o, or u and thus looks like a back vowel, but is phonetically actually a front vowel, and governs vowel harmony accordingly. An example is the word saat, meaning 'hour' or 'clock', a loanword from Arabic. Its plural is saatler. This is not truly an exception to vowel harmony itself; rather, it is an exception to the rule that a denotes a front vowel.

Disharmony tends to disappear through analogy, especially within loanwords; e.g. Hüsnü (a man's name) < earlier Hüsni, from Arabic husnî; Müslüman 'Moslem, Muslim (adj. and n.)' < Ottoman Turkish müslimân, from Persian mosalmân.

==== Tuvan ====
Tuvan has one of the most complete systems of vowel harmony among the Turkic languages.

=== Mongolic languages ===
Mongolic languages display various vowel harmony systems. While there is some debate, Proto-Mongolic appears to have had a system of backness harmony, from which the modern languages' systems descend.

==== Mongolian ====
Mongolian innovates on Proto-Mongolic's system, exhibiting both tongue root harmony and rounding harmony. The tongue root harmony involves the vowels: /a, ʊ, ɔ/ (+RTR) and /i, u, e, o/ (-RTR). The vowel /i/ is phonetically similar to the -RTR vowels, but is largely transparent to vowel harmony. Rounding harmony affects only the open vowels, /e, o, a, ɔ/. Some sources refer to the primary harmonization dimension as pharyngealization or palatalness (among other analyses), but neither of these is technically correct. Likewise, referring to ±RTR as the sole defining feature of vowel categories in Mongolian is not fully accurate either. In any case, the two vowel categories differ primarily with regard to tongue root position, and ±RTR is a convenient and fairly accurate descriptor for the articulatory parameters involved.

-RTR	э[e]	ү[u]	ө[o]	и[i]
+RTR	а[a]	у[ʊ]	о[ɔ]	

==== Kalmyk-Oirat ====
Kalmyk-Oirat, a western Mongolic language, displays very clear backness harmony. Words may only contain back or front vowels, but may be rounded or unrounded. /y/ alternates with /u/, /ø/ alternates with /o/, /æ/ alternates with /a/, and /i/ has the allophone [ɨ] in suffixes. /e/ is mostly transparent to vowel harmony.

=== Korean ===
Korean is an example of a language with a vowel harmony system that is gradually becoming less productive. While Middle Korean had strong vowel harmony, modern Korean retains it only in certain cases such as onomatopoeia, adjectives, adverbs, conjugation, and interjections. Many native Korean words demonstrate the formerly productive vowel harmony, such as 사람 (saram, 'person') and 부엌 (bu-eok, 'kitchen').

The current system of Korean vowel harmony is based on the orthographic system where vowels are classified as either positive/light, negative/dark, or neutral. Many scholars treat the positive vowels as +RTR and the negative and neutral vowels as −RTR, though due to historical sound changes this featural distinction has become obscured. The basic conjugations for Korean's tenses demonstrate this vowel harmony, using the +RTR vowel /a/ or −RTR vowel /ʌ/ depending on the last vowel of the verb/adjective stem.

	Positive		Neutral			Negative	
Verb/Adjective infinitive form	알다 [aɭ.da]	보다 [po.da]	내다 [nɛ.da]	예쁘다 [je.p͈ɯ.da]	피다 [pʰi.da]	먹다 [mʌk.da]	주다 [t͡ɕu.da]
Non-past tense marker	아 [a]		어 [ʌ]				
(uncontracted) Conjugated form	알아 [a.ɾa]	보아 [po.a]	내어 [nɛ.ʌ]	예쁘어 [je.p͈ɯ.ʌ]	피어 [pʰi.ʌ]	먹어 [mʌ.kʌ]	주어 [t͡ɕu.ʌ]

Note that the vowel harmony does not spread to subsequent morphemes, such as the polite ending 요 [jo], which uses a +RTR vowel, but occurs the same on words that take the +RTR tense marker.

=== Persian ===
Persian exhibits various types of regressive and progressive vowel harmony in different words and expressions.

In Persian, progressive vowel harmony applies only to prepositions/postpositions when they are attached to pronouns.

Preposition/Post-Position	Pronoun	Result
Be (To)	man (I)	Behem (to me)
Az (From)	man (I)	Azam (from me)
Bā (With)	man (I)	Bāhām (with me)
Rā (At/For)	man (I)	Mārā (at/for me)
	to (you)	Toro (at/for you)

In Persian regressive vowel harmony, some features spread from the triggering non-initial vowel to the target vowel in the preceding syllable. The application and non-application of this backness harmony which can also be considered rounding harmony.

Verb	Result of Rounding Harmony
Be-do (to run)	Bodo
Be-kon (to do)	Bokon
Be-ro (to go)	Boro
Be-kosh (to kill)	Bokosh

=== Uralic languages ===
Many, though not all, Uralic languages show vowel harmony between front and back vowels. Vowel harmony is often hypothesized to have existed in Proto-Uralic, though its original scope remains a matter of discussion.

==== Samoyedic ====
Vowel harmony is found in Nganasan and is reconstructed also for Proto-Samoyedic.

==== Hungarian ====
===== Vowel types =====
Hungarian has a system of front, back, and intermediate (neutral) vowels and some vowel harmony processes. The basic rule is that words including at least one back vowel get back vowel suffixes (karba 'in(to) the arm'), while words excluding back vowels get front vowel suffixes (kézbe 'in(to) the hand'). Single-vowel words which have only the neutral vowels (i, í or é) are unpredictable, but e takes a front-vowel suffix.

Front	e	é	i	í	ö	ő	ü	ű
Back	a	á	-	-	o	ó	u	ú

====== Vowel length ======
Hungarian has contrastive vowel quantity (long and short vowels).

- There are long and short vowel pairs which are indicated using accents in writing in all but four exceptions with the exceptions possibly be either long, or short as well
- The four exceptions are a [ɒ] and á [a:]; e [ɛ], and é [e:]. The vowels in each pair differ in quality as well as length.

Long vowels are simply voiced for a longer time than short vowels. Hungarian long vowels are two units long compared to those in Finnish, another Uralic language, where they are three units long. In order for two vowels to be long-short pairs, the long vowel pronounced short must be identical to its short pair, and vice-versa. In the case of the four exceptions, this is not applicable because – contrary to their written form – the four exceptions are not two pairs of long, and short vowels, but vowels with pronunciation difference that is not only the length

In writing, the long vowel of such vowel pairs is usually marked with a stick-like accent mark, compared to its dot-accented, or non-accented counterpart

- For example papír is often pronounced [pɒpːir] instead of [pɒpiːr]

In the four exceptions case the stick-like accent (á [a:], é [e:]) refer to long length most if not all the time

- Note – while stick-like accents mark long – double dot, and double stick accents mark cleft lip pronunciation (approaching [ɛ] sound)

In practice these long and short vowels sometimes lengthen or shorten due to agglutinations. Most if not all the time this change is with written difference (meaning that the accent becomes different according)

- híd – hidak – in this case the pronunciation is according to the words are written (long in the first, short in the second word)

It can happen that an exceptional vowel is gaining, or losing an accent regardless of it not being the long, or the short pair of the other

- fél – felek – in this case the pronunciation is according to the words are written (long in the first, short in the second word), yet these are not long, and short pairs
- fa – fák – in this case the pronunciation is according to the words are written (short in the first, long in the second word), yet these are not short, and long pairs

====== Vowel cleft lipness ======
There are cleft lip, and non-cleft lip vowel pairs. Cleft lip vowels approach [ɛ] sound when pronounced compared to its non-cleft lip vowel pairs. All these letters (or sounds if you will) other than e [ɛ], and é [e:] are marked with double accents (both double dot, and double sticks)

- For example ö [ø] is the short cleft lip version, while ő [ø:] is the long cleft lip version of o [o]

Words with such sounds are often agglutinated using cleft lip vowels also

1. okos + kd = okoskodó (he or she is playing smart)
  - Non-cleft lip vowel of root word to non-cleft lip vowel in agglutination
2. hős + kd = hősködő (he or she is playing hero)
  - Cleft lip vowel of root word to cleft lip vowel in agglutination
3. daru + z = daruzó (he or she is operating a crane often)
  - Non-cleft lip vowel of root word to non-cleft lip vowel in agglutination
4. hegedű + z = hegedűző (he or she is playing on a violin often)
  - Cleft lip vowel of root word to cleft lip vowel in agglutination

Naturally since e [ɛ], and é [e:] are also cleft lip (by definition, not by accent on letter) with these as the last vowel of a word the following examples are also valid

1. foci + z = focizó (he or she playing football often)
  - Non-cleft lip vowel of root word to non-cleft lip vowel in agglutination
2. tévé + z = tévéző (he or she is watching tv often)
  - Cleft lip vowel of root word to cleft lip vowel in agglutination
3. ló + vgl = lovagló (he or she is riding a horse)
  - Non-cleft lip vowel of root word to non-cleft lip vowel in agglutination
4. teve + vgl = tevegelő (he or she is riding a camel)
  - Cleft lip vowel of root word to cleft lip vowel in agglutination
- Note that "vgl" is not considered an agglutination, but in the camel's case it is used as one. "To ride" means lovagol, in which "o", and "l" are supposed to switch places. Lovag means knight, and "to ride a horse" is "to pretend to be a knight" rather in Hungarian language, but in the word for camel there is a "v", and it is very in a convenient place there. The word for knight is maybe related to the word for horse in Hungarian language
- Note that all these examples here are adjectives, and not very translatable

===== Behaviour of neutral vowels =====
Unrounded front vowels (or Intermediate or neutral vowels) can occur together with either back vowels (e.g. répa carrot, kocsi car) or rounded front vowels (e.g. tető, tündér), but rounded front vowels and back vowels can occur together only in words of foreign origins (e.g. sofőr = chauffeur, French word for driver). The basic rule is that words including at least one back vowel take back vowel suffixes (e.g. répában in a carrot, kocsiban in a car), while words excluding back vowels usually take front vowel suffixes (except for words including only the vowels i, í, and é, for which there is no general rule, e.g. lisztet against hidat, or céloz against rémes).

		open	middle	closed
Back ("low")		a á	o ó	u ú
Front ("high")	unrounded (neutral)		e é	i í
Front ("high")	rounded		ö ő	ü ű

Some other rules and guidelines to consider:

- Compound words get suffix according to the last word, e.g.: ártér (floodplain) compound of ár + tér front vowel suffix just as the word tér when stands alone (téren, ártéren)
- In case of words of obvious foreign origins: only the last vowel counts (if it is not i or í): sofőrhöz, nüanszszal, generálás, októberben, parlamentben, szoftverrel
  - If the last vowel of the foreign word is i or í, then the last but one vowel will be taken into consideration, e.g. papírhoz, Rashiddal. If the foreign word includes only the vowels i or í then it gets front vowel suffix, e.g.: Mitch-nek ( = "for Mitch")
  - There are some non-Hungarian geographical names that have no vowels at all (e.g. the Croatian island of Krk), in which case as the word does not include back vowel, it gets front vowel suffix (e.g. Krk-re = to Krk)
- For acronyms: the last vowel counts (just as in case of foreign words), e.g.: HR (pronounced: há-er) gets front vowel suffix as the last pronounced vowel is front vowel (HR-rel = with HR)
- Some 1-syllable Hungarian words with i, í or é are strictly using front suffixes (gépre, mélyről, víz > vizet, hírek), while some others can take back suffixes only (héjak, szíjról, nyíl > nyilat, zsírban, írás)
- Some foreign words that have fit to the Hungarian language and start with back vowel and end with front vowel can take either front or back suffixes (so can be optionally considered foreign word or Hungarian word): farmerban or farmerben

===== Suffixes with multiple forms =====
Grammatical suffixes in Hungarian can have one, two, three, or four forms:

- One form: every word gets the same suffix regardless of the included vowels (e.g. -kor)
- Two forms (most common): words get either back vowel or front vowel suffix (as mentioned above) (e.g. -ban/-ben)
- Three forms: there is one back vowel form and two front vowel forms; one for words whose last vowel is rounded front vowel and one for words whose last vowel is not rounded front vowel (e.g. -hoz/-hez/-höz)
- Four forms: there are two back vowel forms and two front vowel forms (e.g. -ot/-at/-et/-öt or simply -t, if the last sound is a vowel)

An example on basic numerals:

			-kor (at, for time)	-ban/-ben (in)	-hoz/-hez/-höz (to)	-t/-ot/-at/-et/-öt (accusative)
Back	(regular stem)	hat (6)	hatkor nyolckor háromkor – egykor négykor kilenckor tízkor ötkor kettőkor	hatban nyolcban háromban százban	hathoz nyolchoz háromhoz százhoz	hatot
Back	(low-vowel stem)	nyolc (8) három (3) száz (100)	hatkor nyolckor háromkor – egykor négykor kilenckor tízkor ötkor kettőkor	hatban nyolcban háromban százban	hathoz nyolchoz háromhoz százhoz	nyolcat hármat százat
Front	unrounded (neutral)	egy (1) négy (4) kilenc (9) tíz (10)	hatkor nyolckor háromkor – egykor négykor kilenckor tízkor ötkor kettőkor	egyben négyben kilencben tízben ötben kettőben	egyhez négyhez kilenchez tízhez	egyet négyet kilencet tízet
Front	rounded	öt (5) kettő (2)	hatkor nyolckor háromkor – egykor négykor kilenckor tízkor ötkor kettőkor	egyben négyben kilencben tízben ötben kettőben	öthöz kettőhöz	ötöt kettőt

===== Agglutination vowel constraints =====
Hungarian language is a consonant oriented language that makes vowel harmony possible, but the vowels in agglutinations can not be changed according to free will. Some of such vowels even change the meaning of the word

- For this reason the vowels in agglutinations are constrained seemingly arbitrary

For example it was mentioned that the last cleft lip vowel in the root of the word induces an agglutination with also at least one cleft lip vowel in it, however this is not always the case due to certain agglutinations are constrained. One good example is the -kor agglutination that can not take any other vowel, but o

- ötöt – in accusative case the vowel before t is not as constrained
- ötkor – in this case o vowel is constrained not to be cleft lip
- egykor – in this case o vowel is constrained not to be frontal (high), and not to be cleft lip

There are further examples of vowel constraints in agglutinations not only for cleft lip-ness with some agglutination possessing

1. only one (-kor, etc...)
2. only two (-zó - -ző, -ás - -és, -val - -vel, etc...)
3. only three (-hez - -höz - -hoz)
4. or more forms (accusative case, etc..)

The vowel in these forms are only short, or only long

- Generally speaking an agglutination with a given meaning – or even a given context of meanings – may only possess either a long, or a short vowel throughout its forms regarding constraints

In the following examples the used vowels in the agglutinations change the meaning

1. tévé + zk = tévézek – I am watching tv
2. tévé + zk = tévézik – he is watching tv
3. tévé + zk = tévézők – people who are watching tv

As you can see in the last example's agglutination of tévézők is with long vowel. This resulted in a noun, not a verb. The long vowel renders meaning completely detached of the other two examples' context. The other two are in a context with only short vowels, with the rest of their context is the following:

1. tévé + zl = tévézel – you (singular) are watching tv
  - Agglutination -zel is with short vowel
2. tévé + ztk = tévéztek – you (plural) are watching tv
  - Agglutination -ztek is with short vowel
3. tévé + znk = tévézünk – we are watching tv
  - Agglutination -zünk is with short vowel
4. tévé + znk = tévéznek – they are watching tv
  - Agglutination -znek is with short vowel

Likewise using the same agglutination used to tévézők, the word utazók is also with long vowel, that is also a noun against utazok with a short vowel that is likewise a verb

==== Mansi ====
Vowel harmony occurred in Southern Mansi.

==== Khanty ====
In the Khanty language, vowel harmony occurs in the Eastern dialects, and affects both inflectional and derivational suffixes. The Vakh-Vasyugan dialect has a particularly extensive system of vowel harmony:

Trigger Vowels
Front	/æ/	/ø/	/y/	/i/	/ɪ/	/ʏ/	/e/	/œ/
Back	/ɑ/	/o/	/u/	/ɯ/	/ʌ/	/ʊ/		/ɔ/

Target Vowels
Front	/æ/	/ø/	/y/	/i/	/ɪ/	/ʏ/
Back	/ɑ/	/o/	/u/	/ɯ/	/ʌ/	/ʊ/

Trigger vowels occur in the first syllable of a word, and control the backness of the entire word. Target vowels are affected by vowel harmony and are arranged in seven front-back pairs of similar height and roundedness, which are assigned the archiphonemes A, O, U, I, Ɪ, Ʊ.

The vowels /e/, /œ/ and /ɔ/ appear only in the first syllable of a word, and are thus strictly trigger vowels. All other vowel qualities may act in both roles.

Vowel harmony is lost in the Northern and Southern dialects, as well as in the Surgut dialect of Eastern Khanty.

==== Mari ====
Most varieties of the Mari language have vowel harmony.

==== Erzya ====
The Erzya language has a limited system of vowel harmony, involving only two vowel phonemes: /e/ (front) versus /o/ (back).

Moksha, the closest relative of Erzya, has no phonemic vowel harmony, though /ə/ has front and back allophones in a distribution similar to the vowel harmony in Erzya.

==== Finnic languages ====
Vowel harmony is found in most of the Finnic languages. It has been lost in Livonian and in Standard Estonian, where the front vowels ü ä ö occur only in the first (stressed) syllable. South Estonian Võro (and Seto) language as well as some North Estonian dialects, however, retain vowel harmony.

===== Finnish =====
A diagram illustrating vowel harmony in Finnish

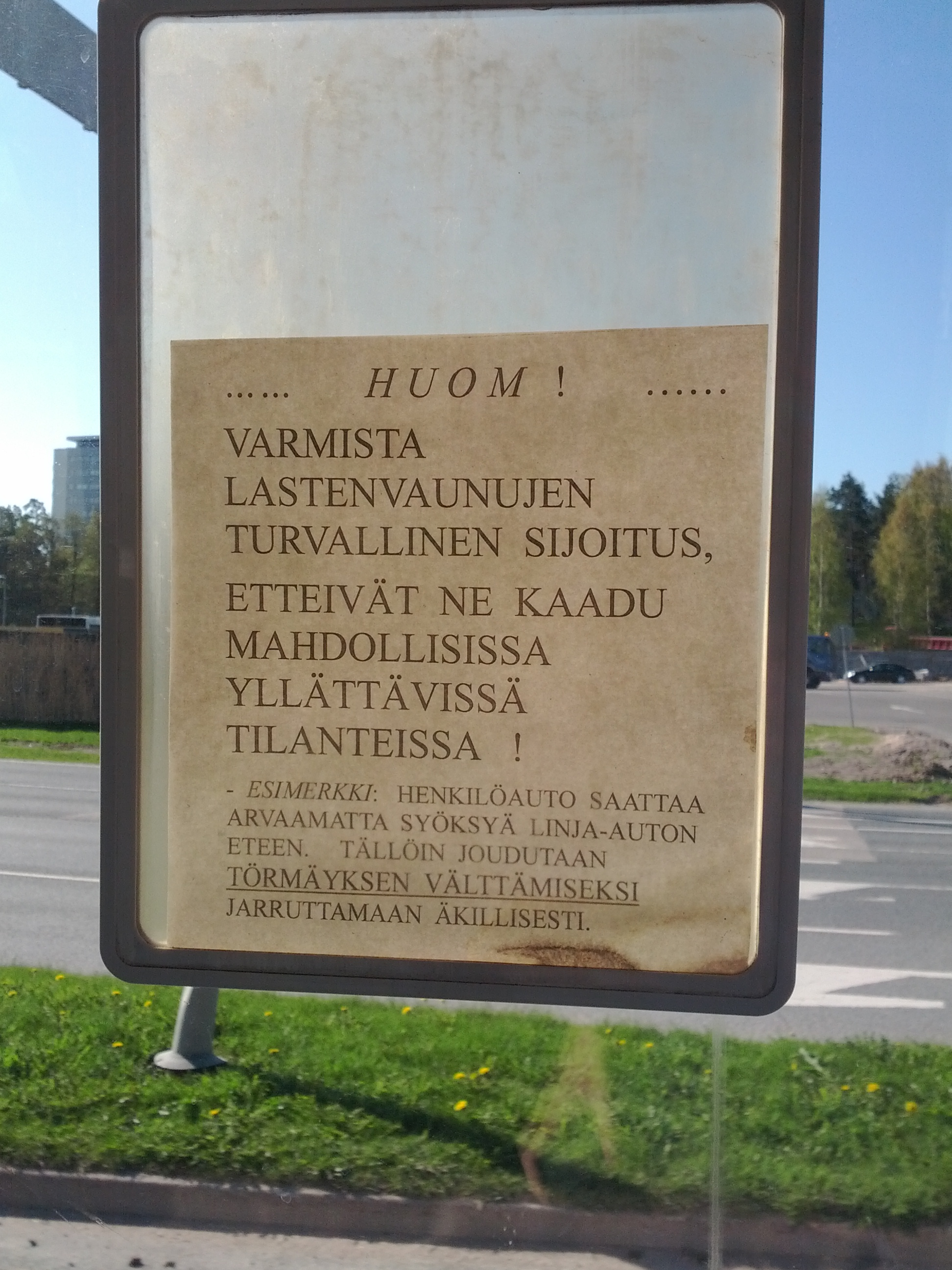
Finnish vowel harmony and case agreement exemplified by mahdollisissa yllättävissä tilanteissa ('in possible unexpected situations'): mahdollinen takes -ssa, yllättävä takes -ssä and tilanne, with a neutral vowel first but a back vowel second, takes -ssa.

In the Finnish language, there are three classes of vowels – front, back, and neutral, where each front vowel has a back vowel pairing. Grammatical endings such as case and derivational endings – but not enclitics – have only archiphonemic vowels U, O, A, which are realized as either back [u, o, ɑ] or front [y, ø, æ] inside a single word. From vowel harmony it follows that the initial syllable of each single (non-compound) word controls the frontness or backness of the entire word. Non-initially, the neutral vowels are transparent to and unaffected by vowel harmony. In the initial syllable:

1. a back vowel causes all non-initial syllables to be realized with back (or neutral) vowels, e.g. pos+ahta+(t)a → posahtaa
2. a front vowel causes all non-initial syllables to be realized with front (or neutral) vowels, e.g. räj+ahta+(t)a → räjähtää.
3. a neutral vowel acts like a front vowel, but does not control the frontness or backness of the word: if there are back vowels in non-initial syllables, the word acts like it began with back vowels, even if they come from derivational endings, e.g. sih+ahta+(t)a → sihahtaa cf. sih+ise+(t)a → sihistä.

For example:

- kaura begins with back vowel → kauralla
- kuori begins with back vowel → kuorella
- sieni begins without back vowels → sienellä (not *sienella)
- käyrä begins without back vowels → käyrällä
- tuote begins with back vowels → tuotteessa
- kerä begins with a neutral vowel → kerällä
- kera begins with a neutral vowel, but has a noninitial back vowel → keralla

Some dialects that have a sound change opening diphthong codas also permit archiphonemic vowels in the initial syllable. For example, standard 'ie' is reflected as 'ia' or 'iä', controlled by noninitial syllables, in the Tampere dialect, e.g. tiä ← tie but miakka ← miekka

... as evidenced by tuotteessa (not *tuotteessä). Even if phonologically front vowels precede the suffix -nsa, grammatically it is preceded by a word controlled by a back vowel. As shown in the examples, neutral vowels make the system asymmetrical, as they are front vowels phonologically, but leave the front/back control to any grammatical front or back vowels. There is little or no change in the actual vowel quality of the neutral vowels.

As a consequence, Finnish speakers often have problems with pronouncing foreign words which do not obey vowel harmony. For example, olympia is often pronounced olumpia. The position of some loans is unstandardized (e.g. chattailla/chättäillä) or ill-standardized (e.g. polymeeri, sometimes pronounced polumeeri, and autoritäärinen, which violate vowel harmony). Where a foreign word violates vowel harmony by not using front vowels because it begins with a neutral vowel, then last syllable generally counts, although this rule is irregularly followed. Experiments indicate that e.g. miljonääri always becomes (front) miljonääriä, but marttyyri becomes equally frequently both marttyyria (back) and marttyyriä (front), even by the same speaker.

With respect to vowel harmony, compound words can be considered multiple separate words. For example, syyskuu ('autumn month', i.e., 'September') has both u and y, but it consists of two words syys and kuu, and declines syys·kuu·ta (not *syyskuutä). The same goes for enclitics, e.g., taaksepäin 'backwards' consists of the word taakse 'to back' and -päin '-wards', which gives, e.g., taaksepäinkään (not *taaksepäinkaan or *taaksepainkaan). If fusion takes place, the vowel is harmonized by some speakers, e.g. tälläinen for tällainen ← tämän lainen.

Some Finnish words whose stems contain only neutral vowels exhibit an alternating pattern in terms of vowel harmony when inflected or forming new words through derivation. Examples include meri 'sea', meressä 'in the sea' (inessive), but merta (partitive), not *mertä; veri 'blood', verestä 'from the blood' (elative), but verta (partitive), not *vertä; pelätä 'to be afraid', but pelko 'fear', not *pelkö; kipu 'pain', but kipeä 'sore', not *kipea.

Helsinki slang has slang words that have roots violating vowel harmony, e.g., Sörkka. This can be interpreted as being due to Swedish influence.

===== Veps =====
The Veps language has partially lost vowel harmony.

=== Yokuts ===
Vowel harmony is present in all Yokutsan languages and dialects. For instance, Yawelmani has four vowels (which additionally may be either long or short). These can be grouped as in the table below.

	Unrounded	Rounded
High	i	u
Low	a	ɔ

Vowels in suffixes must harmonize with either /u/ or its non-/u/ counterparts or with /ɔ/ or non-/ɔ/ counterparts. For example, the vowel in the aorist suffix appears as /u/ when it follows a /u/ in the root, but when it follows all other vowels it appears as /i/. Similarly, the vowel in the nondirective gerundial suffix appears as /ɔ/ when it follows an /ɔ/ in the root; otherwise it appears as /a/.

Word	IPA	Comment
-hun/-hin		(aorist suffix)
muṭhun	[muʈhun]	'swear (aorist)'
giy̓hin	[ɡijˀhin]	'touch (aorist)'
gophin	[ɡɔphin]	'take of infant (aorist)'
xathin	[xathin]	'eat (aorist)'
-tow/-taw		(nondirective gerundial suffix)
goptow	[ɡɔptɔw]	'take care of infant (nondir. ger.)'
giy̓taw	[ɡijˀtaw]	'touch (nondir. ger.)'
muṭtaw	[muʈtaw]	'swear (nondir. ger.)'
xattaw	[xatːaw]	'eat (nondir. ger.)'

In addition to the harmony found in suffixes, there is a harmony restriction on word stems where in stems with more than one syllable all vowels are required to be of the same lip rounding and tongue height dimensions. For example, a stem must contain all high rounded vowels or all low rounded vowels, etc. This restriction is further complicated by (i) long high vowels being lowered and (ii) an epenthetic vowel [i] which does not harmonize with stem vowels.

=== Sumerian ===
There is some evidence for vowel harmony according to vowel height or ATR in the prefix i_{3}/e- in inscriptions from pre-Sargonic Lagash (the specifics of the pattern have led a handful of scholars to postulate not only an /o/ phoneme, but even an /ɛ/ and, most recently, an /ɔ/) Many cases of partial or complete assimilation of the vowel of certain prefixes and suffixes to one in the adjacent syllable are reflected in writing in some of the later periods, and there is a noticeable though not absolute tendency for disyllabic stems to have the same vowel in both syllables. What appears to be vowel contraction in hiatus (*/aa/, */ia/, */ua/ > a, */ae/ > a, */ue/ > u, etc.) is also very common.

=== Other languages ===
Vowel harmony occurs to some degree in many other languages, such as

- Several dialects of Arabic (see imala) including:
  - Palestinian Arabic
  - Iraqi Arabic
  - Lebanese Arabic
- Akan languages (tongue root position)
- Assamese
- Australian Aboriginal languages
  - Jingulu
  - Warlpiri
- Assyrian Neo-Aramaic (vowel harmony of one particular timbre across all vowels of a word)
- Several Bantu languages such as:
  - Standard Lingala (height)
  - Kgalagadi (height)
  - Malila (height)
  - Phuthi (right-to-left and left-to-right)
  - Shona
  - Southern Sotho (right-to-left and left-to-right)
  - Northern Sotho (right-to-left and left-to-right)
  - Tswana (right-to-left and left-to-right)
- Bezhta
- Some Chadic languages, such as Buwal
- Chukchi
- Coeur d'Alene (tongue root position and height)
- Coosan languages
- Dusunic languages
- Iberian languages
  - Astur-Leonese
  - Galician and Portuguese dialects
  - Catalan/Valencian
  - Eastern Andalusian Spanish
  - Murcian Spanish
- Igbo (tongue root position)
- Italo-Romance languages: several Swiss Italian dialects (including total vowel harmony systems).
- Japanese language – in some of the Kansai dialects. Additionally, some consider that vowel harmony must have existed at one time in Old Japanese, though there is no broad consensus. See the pertinent Phonology.
- Maiduan languages
- Nez Percé
- Nilotic languages
- Qiang (rhotic vowel harmony)
- Buchan Scots is a Scots dialect with vowel height harmony, compare [here] "hairy", [rili] "really". This effect is blocked by voiced obstruents and certain consonant clusters: [bebi] "baby", [lʌmpi] "lumpy".
- Somali
- Takelma
- Telugu
- Several Tibetic languages, including Lhasa Tibetan
- Tungusic languages, such as Manchu
- Utian languages
- Urhobo
- Yurok (rhotic vowel harmony)

== Other types of harmony ==
Although vowel harmony is the most well-known harmony, not all types of harmony that occur in the world's languages involve only vowels. Other types of harmony involve consonants (and is known as consonant harmony). Rarer types of harmony are those that involve tone or both vowels and consonants (e.g. postvelar harmony).

=== Vowel–consonant harmony ===
Some languages have harmony processes that involve an interaction between vowels and consonants. For example, Chilcotin has a phonological process known as vowel flattening (i.e. post-velar harmony) where vowels must harmonize with uvular and pharyngealized consonants.

Chilcotin has two classes of vowels:

- "flat" vowels [ᵊi, e, ᵊɪ, o, ɔ, ə, a]
- non-"flat" vowels [i, ɪ, u, ʊ, æ, ɛ]

Additionally, Chilcotin has a class of pharyngealized "flat" consonants [tsˤ, tsʰˤ, tsʼˤ, sˤ, zˤ]. Whenever a consonant of this class occurs in a word, all preceding vowels must be flat vowels.

[jətʰeɬtsˤʰosˤ]	'he's holding it (fabric)'
[ʔapələsˤ]	'apples'
[natʰákʼə̃sˤ]	'he'll stretch himself'

If flat consonants do not occur in a word, then all vowels will be of the non-flat class:

[nænɛntʰǽsʊç]	'I'll comb hair'
[tetʰǽskʼɛn]	'I'll burn it'
[tʰɛtɬʊç]	'he laughs'

Other languages of this region of North America (the Plateau culture area), such as St'át'imcets, have similar vowel–consonant harmonic processes.

=== Syllabic synharmony ===
Syllabic synharmony was a process in the Proto-Slavic language ancestral to all modern Slavic languages. It refers to the tendency of frontness (palatality) to be generalised across an entire syllable. It was therefore a form of consonant–vowel harmony in which the property 'palatal' or 'non-palatal' applied to an entire syllable at once rather than to each sound individually.

The result was that back vowels were fronted after j or a palatal consonant, and consonants were palatalised before j or a front vowel. Diphthongs were harmonized as well, although they were soon monophthongized because of a tendency to end syllables with a vowel (syllables were or became open). This rule remained in place for a long time, and ensured that a syllable containing a front vowel always began with a palatal consonant, and a syllable containing j was always preceded by a palatal consonant and followed by a front vowel.

A similar process occurs in Skolt Sami, where palatalization of consonants and fronting of vowels is a suprasegmental process applying to a whole syllable. Suprasegmental palatalization is marked with the letter ʹ, which is a Modifier letter prime, for example in the word vääʹrr 'mountain, hill'.

=== Rhotic harmony ===
The Mawo dialect of Northern Qiang displays rhotic harmony, where vowels must align with the previous vowel's rhoticity.

=== Unconventional systems ===
Languages such as Nez Perce and Chukchi have vowel harmony systems which can not be easily explained in terms of height, backness, tongue root, or rounding. In Nez Perce, Katherine Nelson (2013) proposes that the two sets of vowels ("dominant" /i a o/ and "recessive" /i æ u/) be considered as distinct "triangles" of vowel space, each by themselves maximally dispersed, where one set is somewhat retracted (further back) in comparison to the dominant. Note here that /i/ can behave as a dominant or recessive vowel depending on the root it is in; it is not transparent to vowel harmony.

== See also ==
- A-mutation
- Ablaut reduplication
- Apophony
- Consonant harmony
- Consonant mutation
- Germanic umlaut
- I-mutation
- Metaphony
- U-mutation
- Vowel-Consonant harmony

== Bibliography ==
- Arias, Álvaro (2006): «La armonización vocálica en fonología funcional (de lo sintagmático en fonología a propósito de dos casos de metafonía hispánica)», Moenia 11: 111–139.
- Delucchi, Rachele (2016), Fonetica e fonologia dell'armonia vocalica. Esiti di -A nei dialetti della Svizzera italiana in prospettiva romanza, vol. Romanica Helvetica 134, Tübingen: Narr Francke Attempto Verlag, ISBN 978-3-7720-8509-3
- Downing, Laura J.; Krämer, Martin (2024). "20. Phrasal Vowel Harmony". Oxford University Press. doi:10.1093/oxfordhb/9780198826804.013.20.
- Harrison, K. David (1999). Vowel harmony and disharmony in Tuvan and Tofa.
- Harrison, K. David; Emily Thomforde, Michael O'Keefe (2004). The Vowel Harmony Calculator.
- Jacobson, Leon Carl. (1978). DhoLuo vowel harmony: A phonetic investigation. Los Angeles: University of California.
- Krämer, Martin. (2003). Vowel harmony and correspondence theory. Berlin: Mouton de Gruyter.
- LaPolla, Randy (2003). A Grammar of Qiang: With Annotated Texts and Glossary. with Chenglong Huang. Berlin: Mouton de Gruyter. ISBN 3-11-017829-X.
- Li, Bing. (1996). Tungusic vowel harmony: Description and analysis. The Hague: Holland Academic Graphics.
- Lloret, Maria-Rosa (2007), "On the Nature of Vowel Harmony: Spreading with a Purpose", in Bisetto, Antonietta; Barbieri, Francesco (eds.), Proceedings of the XXXIII Incontro di Grammatica Generativa, pp. 15–35
- Nelson, Katherine (June 2013). "The Nez Perce vowel system: A phonetic analysis". Proceedings of Meetings on Acoustics. 19. doi:10.1121/1.4800241.
- Piggott, G. & van der Hulst, H. (1997). Locality and the nature of nasal harmony. Lingua, 103, 85-112.
- Roca, Iggy; Johnson, Wyn (1999), A Course in Phonology, Blackwell Publishing
- Shahin, Kimary N. (2002). Postvelar harmony. Amsterdam: John Benjamins Pub.
- Smith, Norval; & Harry van der Hulst (Eds.). (1988). Features, segmental structure and harmony processes (Pts. 1 & 2). Dordrecht: Foris. ISBN 90-6765-399-3 (pt. 1), ISBN 90-6765-430-2 (pt. 2 ) .
- Vago, Robert M. (Ed.). (1980). Issues in vowel harmony: Proceedings of the CUNY Linguistic Conference on Vowel Harmony, 14 May 1977. Amsterdam: J. Benjamins.
- Vago, Robert M. (1994). Vowel harmony. In R. E. Asher (Ed.), The Encyclopedia of language and linguistics (pp. 4954–4958). Oxford: Pergamon Press.
- Walker, R. L. (1998). Nasalization, Neutral Segments, and Opacity Effects (Doctoral dissertation). University of California, Santa Cruz.
