= Rudno, Železniki =

Rudno
- Village
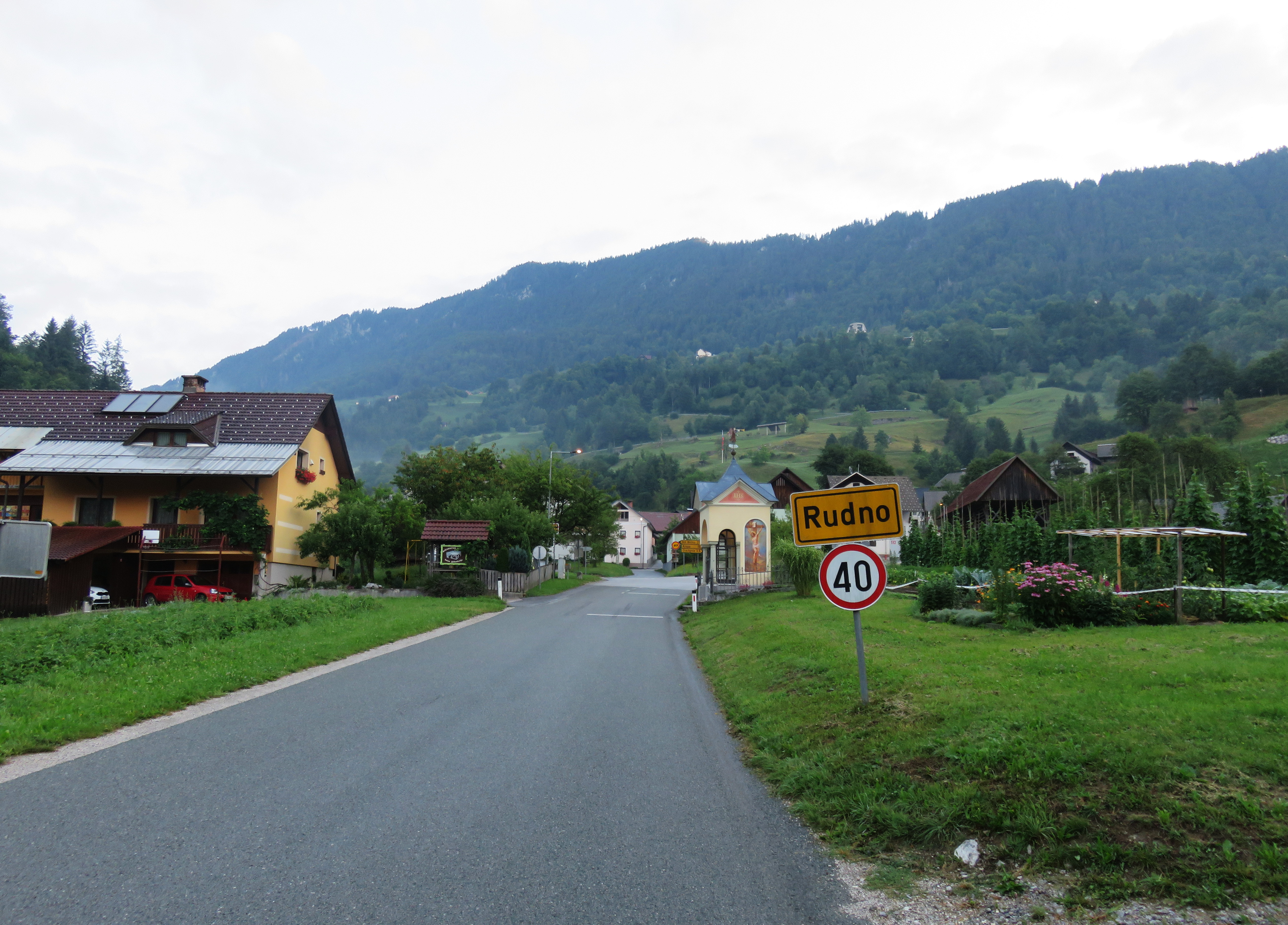

- Location in Slovenia
- Coordinates: 46°14′43.1″N 14°10′00″E
- Country: Slovenia
- Traditional Region: Upper Carniola
- Statistical region: Upper Carniola
- Municipality: Železniki

Area
  - Total: 3.4 km^{2} (1.3 sq mi)
- Elevation: 515.6 m (1,692 ft)

Population (2026)
  - Total: 204
  - Density: 60/km^{2} (160/sq mi)

Rudno (pronounced [ˈɾuːdnɔ]; German: Ruden) is a village in the Municipality of Železniki in the Upper Carniola region of Slovenia. In January 2026, the population was 204.
