= Osojnik, Železniki =

Osojnik
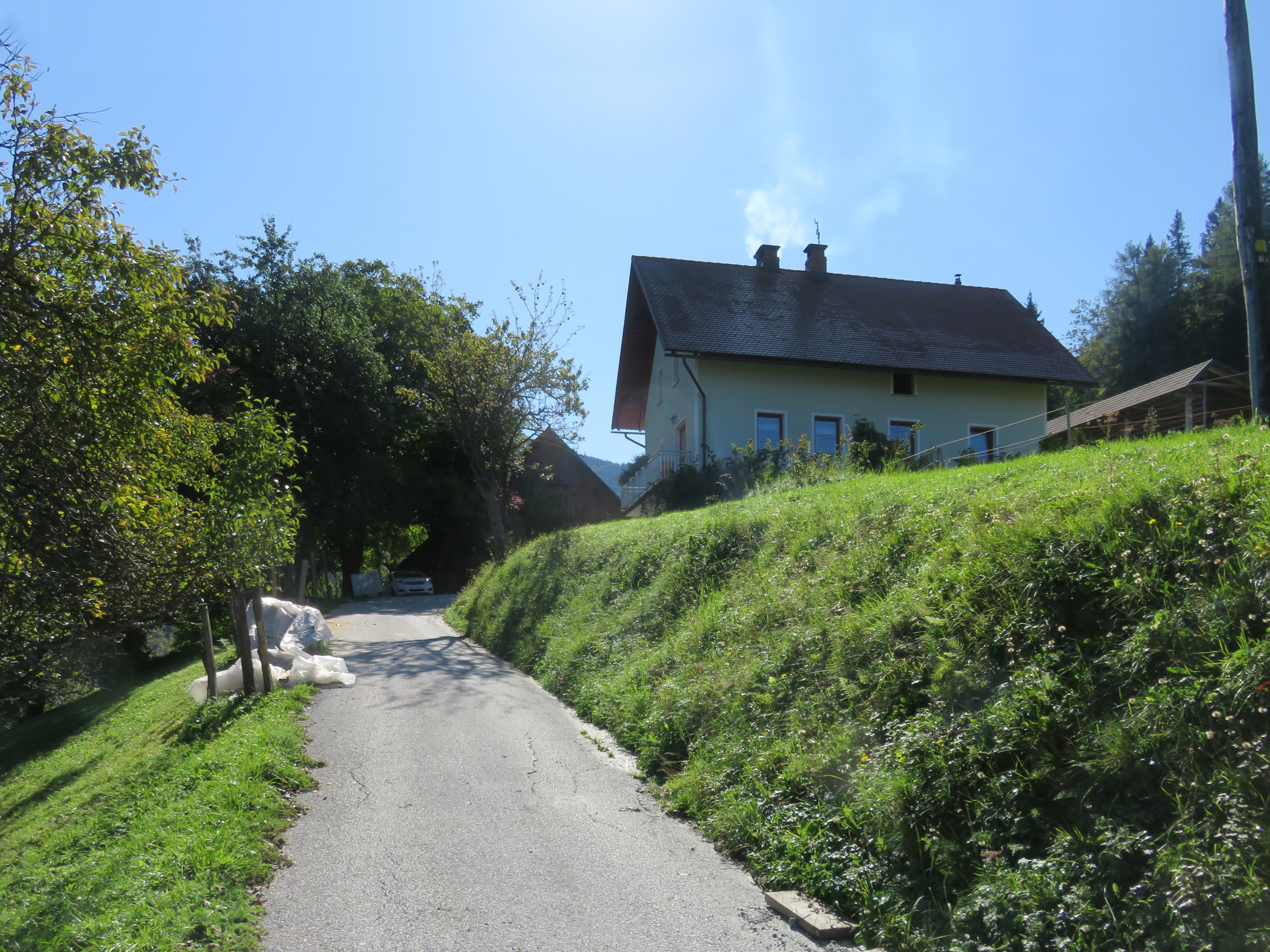

- Location in Slovenia
- Coordinates: 46°11′15.36″N 14°6′51.45″E
- Country: Slovenia
- Traditional Region: Upper Carniola
- Statistical region: Upper Carniola
- Municipality: Železniki

Area
  - Total: 0.727 km^{2} (0.281 sq mi)
- Elevation: 773.4 m (2,537 ft)

Population (2026)
  - Total: 15
  - Density: 21/km^{2} (54/sq mi)

Osojnik (pronounced [ɔˈsoːi̯nik]) is a small settlement in the Municipality of Železniki in the Upper Carniola region of Slovenia. In January 2026, the population was 15.

== Name ==
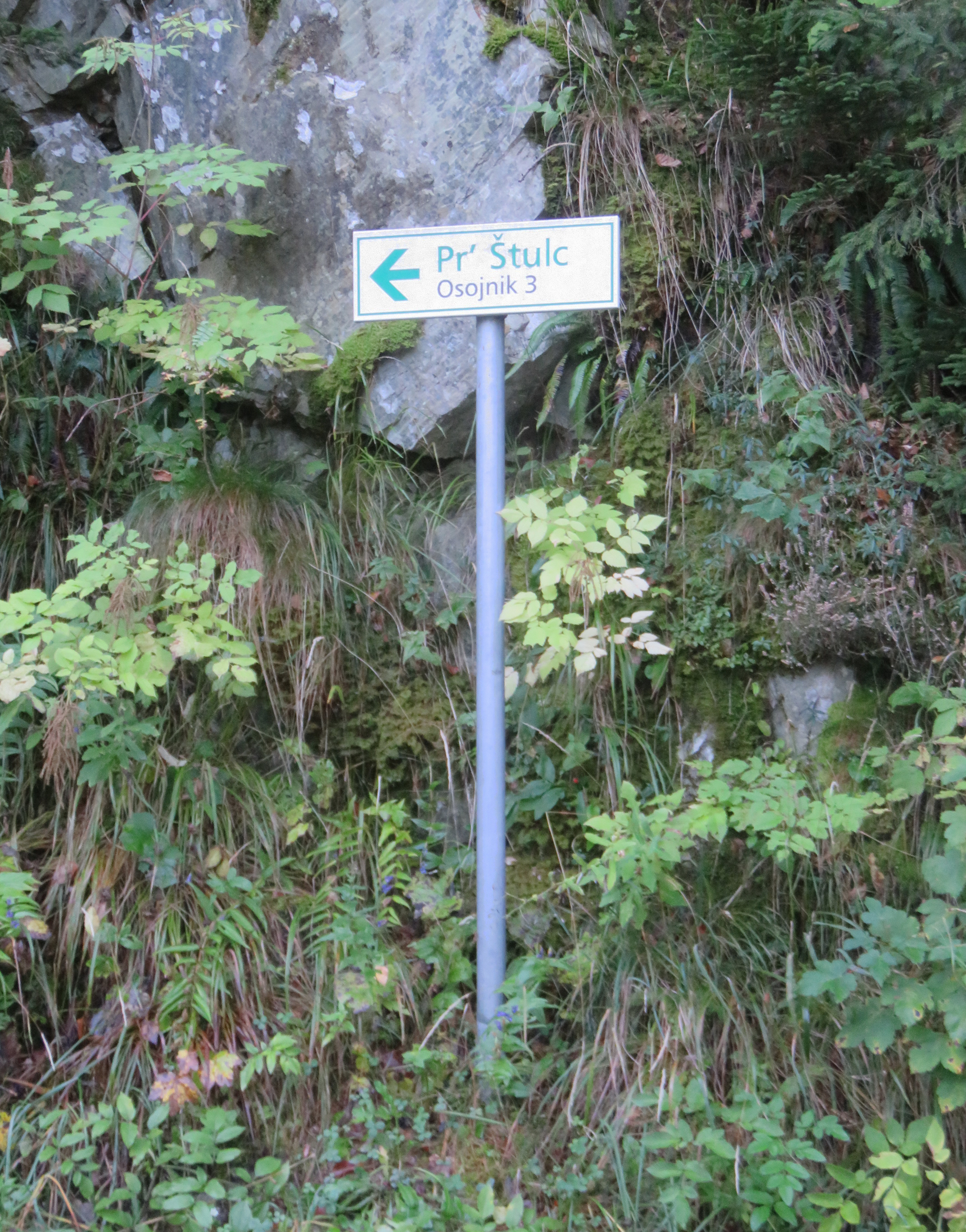
Sign for a house in Osojnik

The name Osojnik is derived from the Slovene common noun osoje 'shady side' via the derived adjective osojen 'shady', referring to its geographical location.
