= Podlonk =

- Village
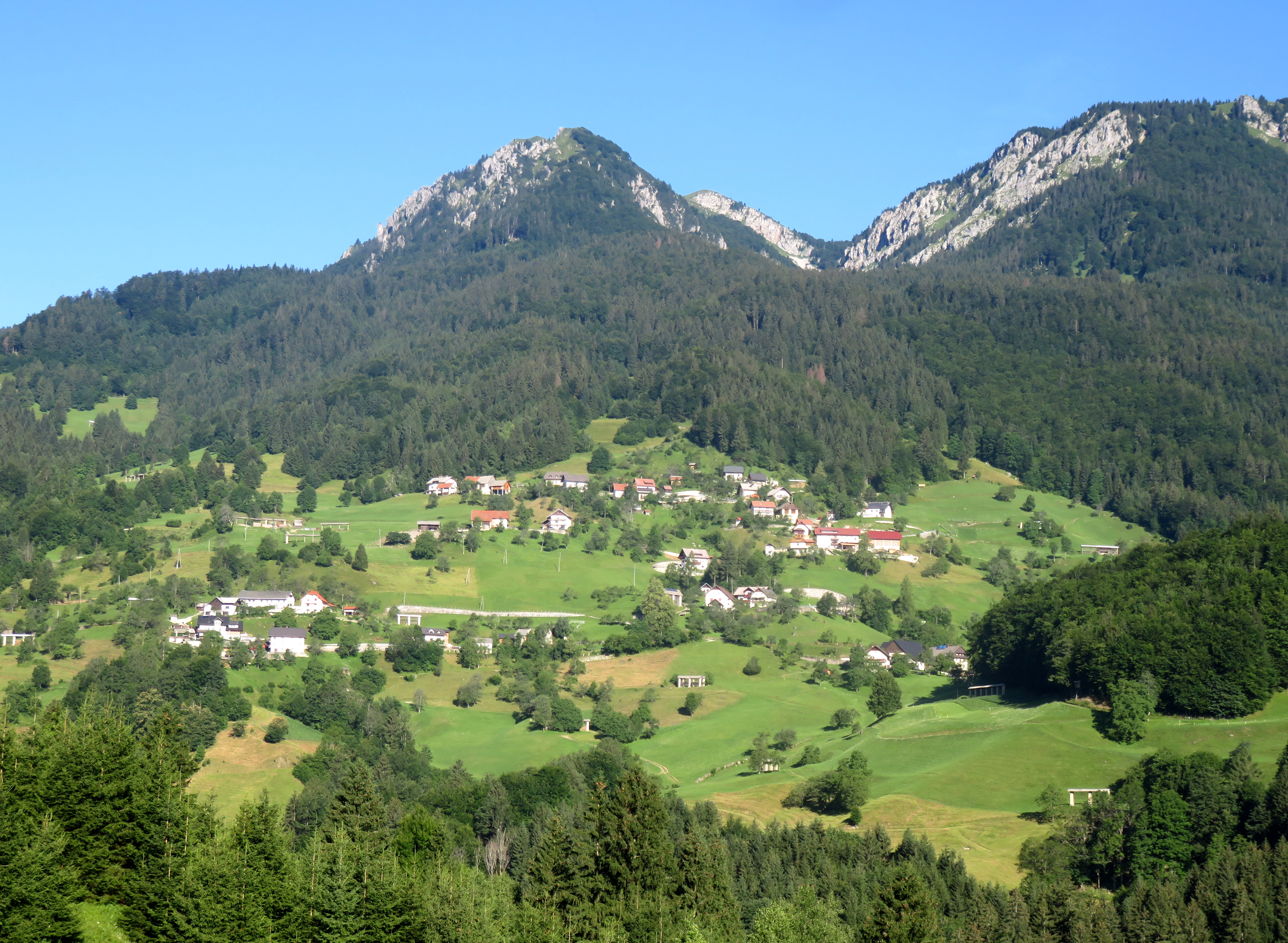

- Location in Slovenia
- Coordinates: 46°13′59.24″N 14°7′31.77″E
- Country: Slovenia
- Traditional Region: Upper Carniola
- Statistical region: Upper Carniola
- Municipality: Železniki

Area
  - Total: 10.012 km^{2} (3.866 sq mi)
- Elevation: 772.4 m (2,534 ft)

Population (2026)
  - Total: 154
  - Density: 15/km^{2} (39/sq mi)

Podlonk (pronounced [pɔˈdlɔːŋk]; German: Podlong) is a settlement in the Municipality of Železniki in the Upper Carniola region of Slovenia. In January 2026, the population was 154.

== Geography ==
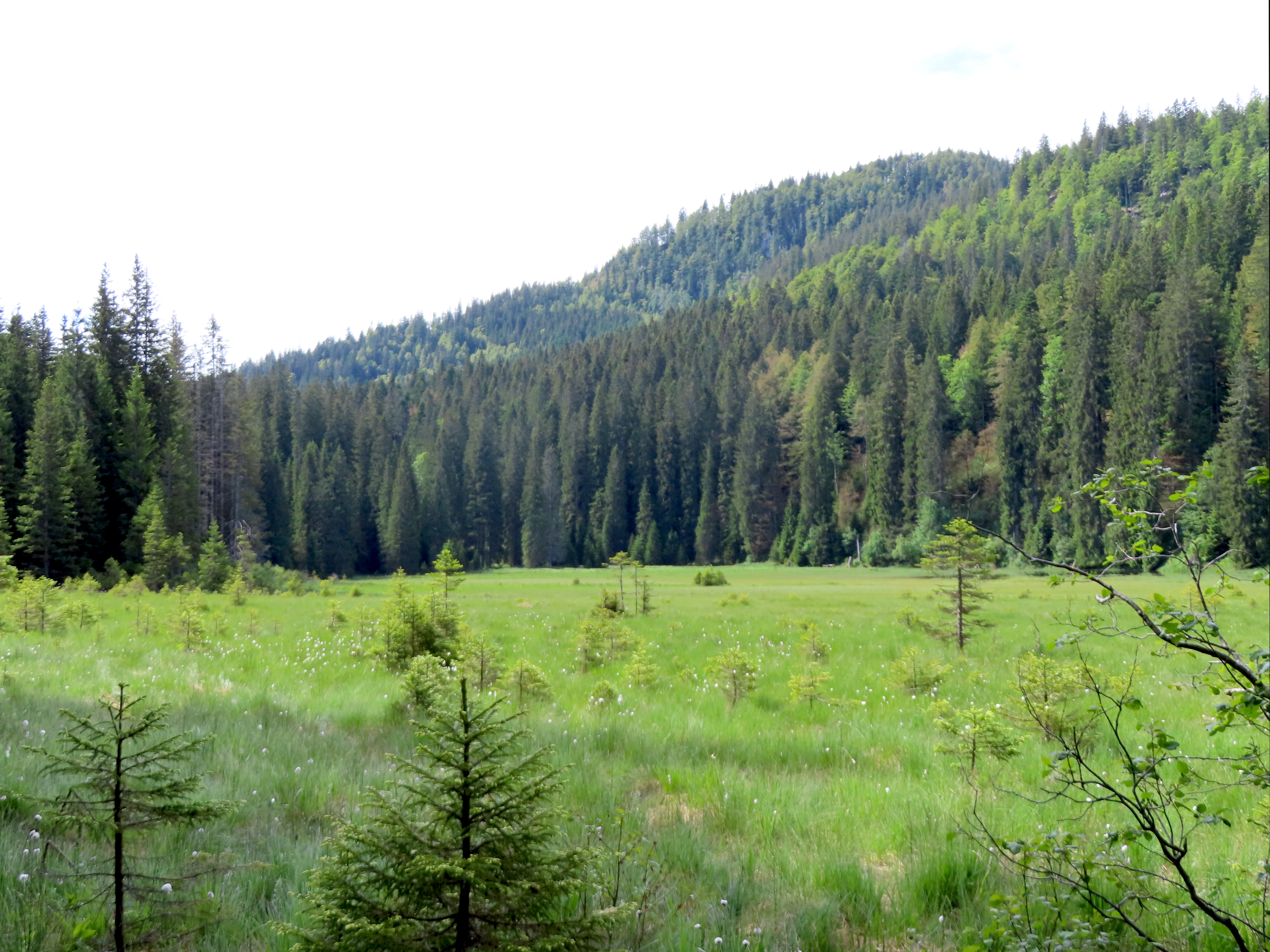
The Ledine Bog

Podlonk is a scattered village located on slanted terraces on the eastern slopes of the Ratitovec Ridge. Lonk Hill (elevation 786 meters or 2,579 feet) stands immediately east of the village. The village includes the hamlet of Draboslovica to the southeast. To the north, the territory of the village extends to Ledine, an ombrotrophic bog on the Jelovica Plateau measuring 6.9 hectares (17 acres) at an elevation of 1,122 meters (3,681 ft).

== Name ==
Podlonk was originally known as Pod planino (literally 'below the mnountain pasture'), attested in 1291 as Potplanino. The modern name Podlonk is a fused prepositional phrase that has lost case inflection: pod 'below' + Lonk, referring to Lonk Hill. That name was attested (with case inflection) as Podlannkam in 1485–1490 and as Podlomkom in 1500. The settlement was known as Podlong in German.
