= Municipality of Železniki =

Municipality of Slovenia

Municipality of Železniki Občina Železniki
- Municipality
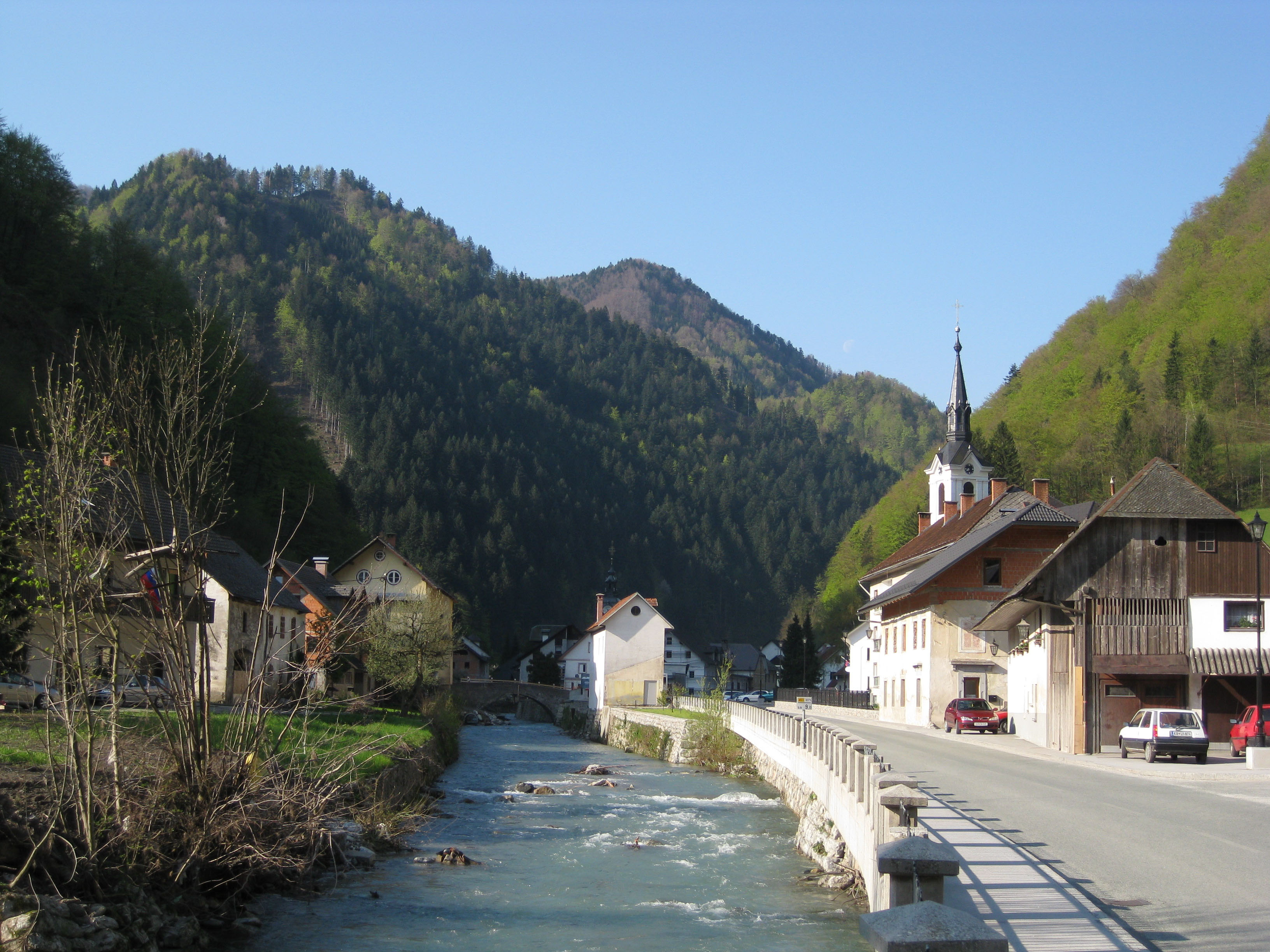

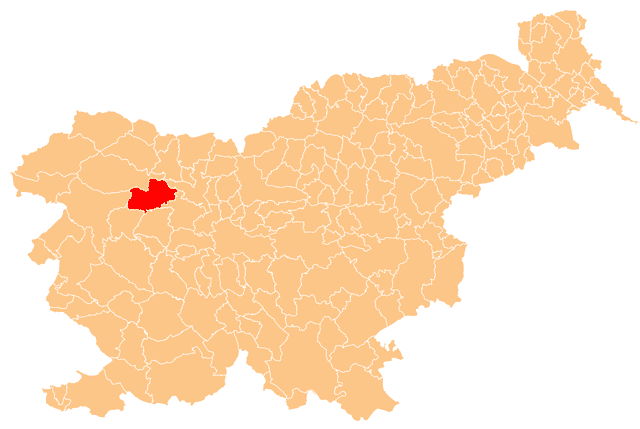
- Location of the Municipality of Železniki in Slovenia
- Coordinates: 46°13′N 14°7′E
- Country: Slovenia

Government
  - Mayor: Marko Gasser

Area
  - Total: 164 km^{2} (63 sq mi)

Population (2010)
  - Total: 6,756
  - Density: 41.2/km^{2} (107/sq mi)
- Time zone: UTC+01 (CET)
  - Summer (DST): UTC+02 (CEST)
- Website: www.zelezniki.si
- Source: Statistical Office of the Republic of Slovenia, census of 2010

The Municipality of Železniki (pronounced [ʒɛˈleːzniki]; Slovene: Občina Železniki) is a municipality in the Upper Carniola region of Slovenia. The seat of the municipality is the town of Železniki.

The municipality was established in its current form on 3 October 1994, when the former larger Municipality of Škofja Loka was subdivided into the municipalities of Gorenja Vas–Poljane, Škofja Loka, Železniki, and Žiri.

== Settlements ==
In addition to the municipal seat of Železniki, the municipality also includes the following settlements:

- Davča
- Dolenja Vas
- Dražgoše
- Golica
- Kališe
- Lajše
- Martinj Vrh
- Ojstri Vrh
- Osojnik
- Podlonk
- Podporezen
- Potok
- Prtovč
- Ravne
- Rudno
- Selca
- Smoleva
- Spodnja Sorica
- Spodnje Danje
- Studeno
- Topolje
- Torka
- Zabrdo
- Zabrekve
- Zala
- Zali Log
- Zgornja Sorica
- Zgornje Danje
