= Zgornje Danje =

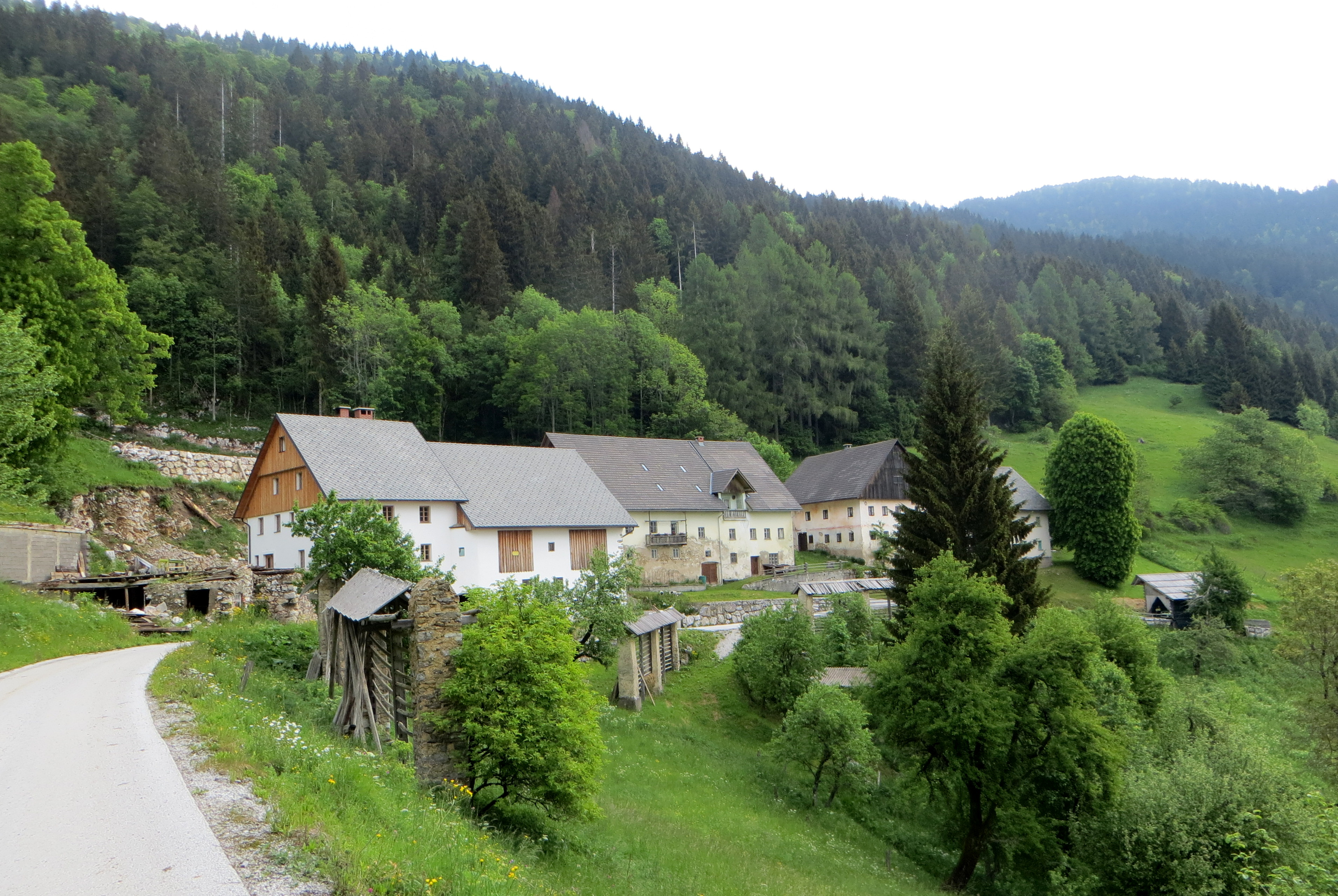

- Location in Slovenia
- Coordinates: 46°14′6.44″N 14°2′57.19″E
- Country: Slovenia
- Traditional Region: Upper Carniola
- Statistical region: Upper Carniola
- Municipality: Železniki

Area
  - Total: 5.290 km^{2} (2.042 sq mi)
- Elevation: 1,099.1 m (3,606 ft)

Population (2026)
  - Total: 6
  - Density: 1/km^{2} (2.6/sq mi)

Zgornje Danje (pronounced [ˈzɡoːɾnjɛ ˈdaːnjɛ]; in older sources also Zgornje Dajne, German: Oberdaine) is a high-elevation settlement in the Municipality of Železniki in the Upper Carniola region of Slovenia. Although there are seven houses in the settlement, in January 2026, the population was 6. It includes the hamlet of Trojar.
