= Golica, Železniki =

Golica
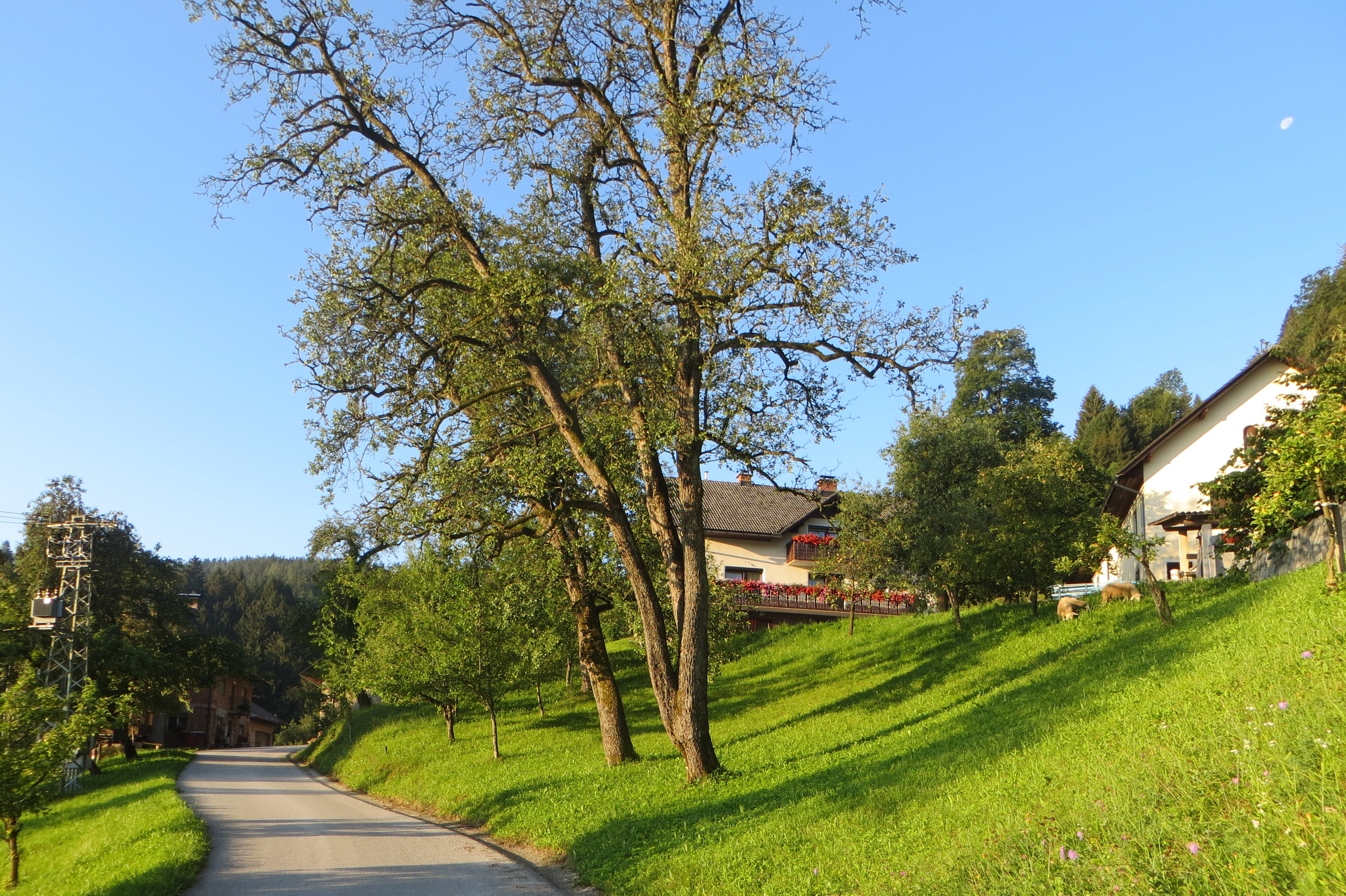

- Location in Slovenia
- Coordinates: 46°12′21.58″N 14°11′34.97″E
- Country: Slovenia
- Traditional Region: Upper Carniola
- Statistical region: Upper Carniola
- Municipality: Železniki

Area
  - Total: 1.827 km^{2} (0.705 sq mi)
- Elevation: 776.5 m (2,548 ft)

Population (2026)
  - Total: 37
  - Density: 20/km^{2} (52/sq mi)

Golica (pronounced [ɡɔˈlìːtsa]) is a settlement in the Municipality of Železniki in the Upper Carniola region of Slovenia. In January 2026, the population was 37.

== Name ==
Golica was attested in historical sources as Golitsch in 1291, Gollitz in 1457, and Dolenigolitzi and Gorenigolitzi (referring to the hamlets of Spodnja Golica and Zgornja Golica) in 1500, among other spellings.

== Church ==
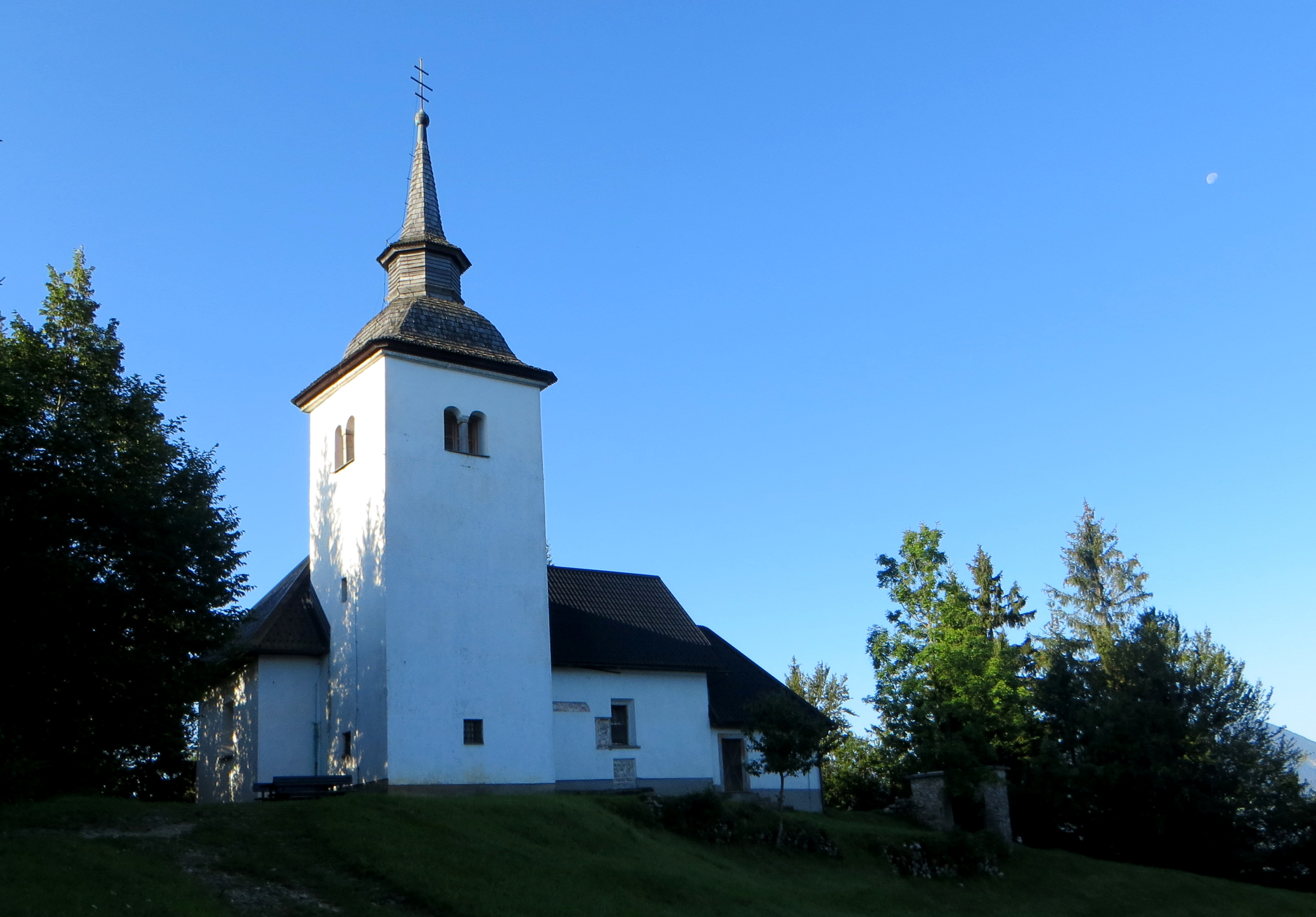
Saint Nicholas's Church

The local church on Mount Saint Nicholas (Slovene: Miklavška gora) above the settlement is dedicated to Saint Nicholas. It is an easy climb and is a popular destination with day-trippers and hikers.
