= Topolje, Železniki =

Topolje
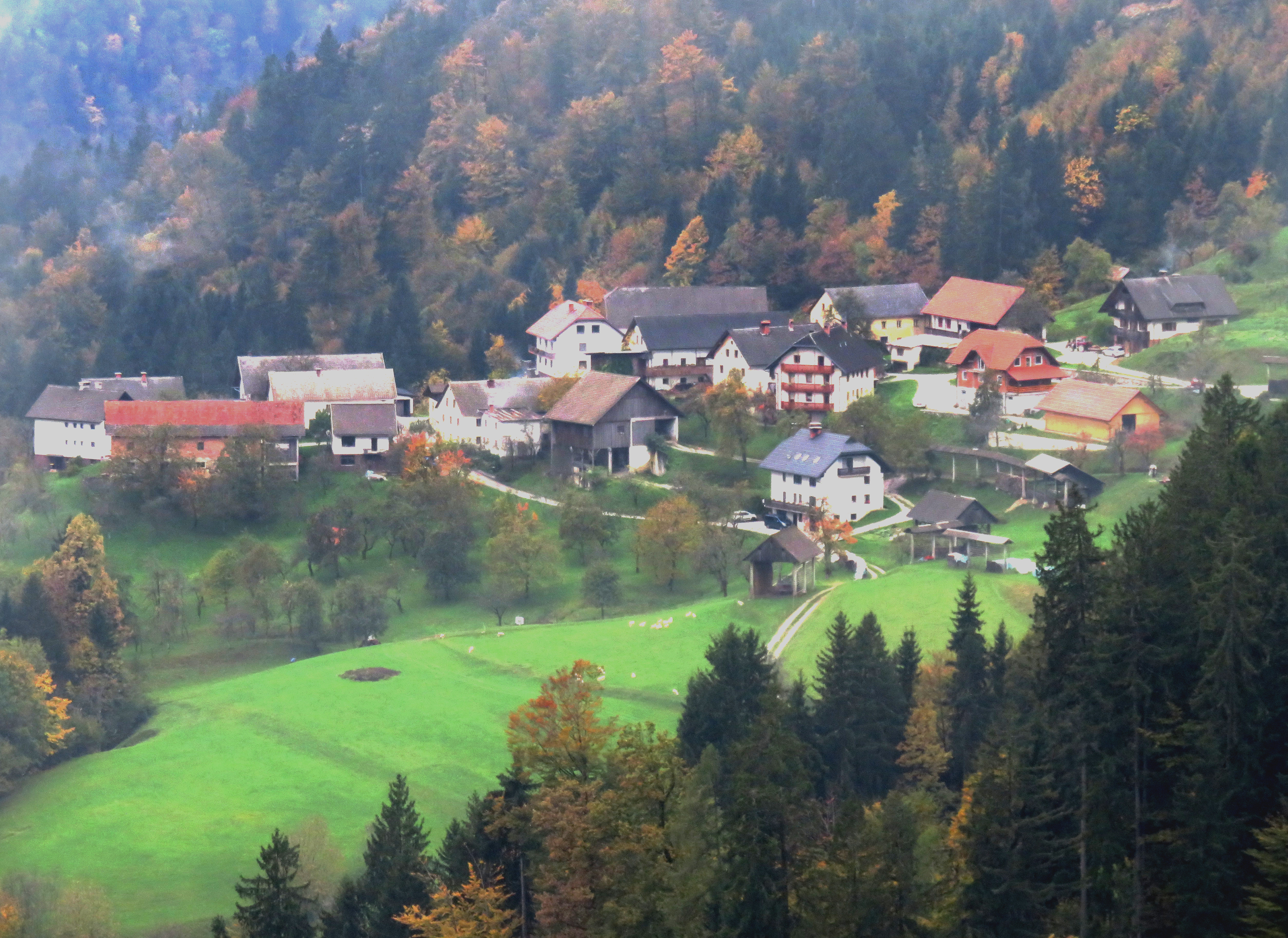

- Location in Slovenia
- Coordinates: 46°13′53.88″N 14°13′5.57″E
- Country: Slovenia
- Traditional Region: Upper Carniola
- Statistical region: Upper Carniola
- Municipality: Železniki

Area
  - Total: 2.175 km^{2} (0.840 sq mi)
- Elevation: 688.7 m (2,260 ft)

Population (2026)
  - Total: 57
  - Density: 26/km^{2} (67/sq mi)

Topolje (pronounced [tɔˈpoːljɛ]) is a small settlement in the Municipality of Železniki in the Upper Carniola region of Slovenia. In January 2026, the population was 57.
