= Ravne, Železniki =

Ravne
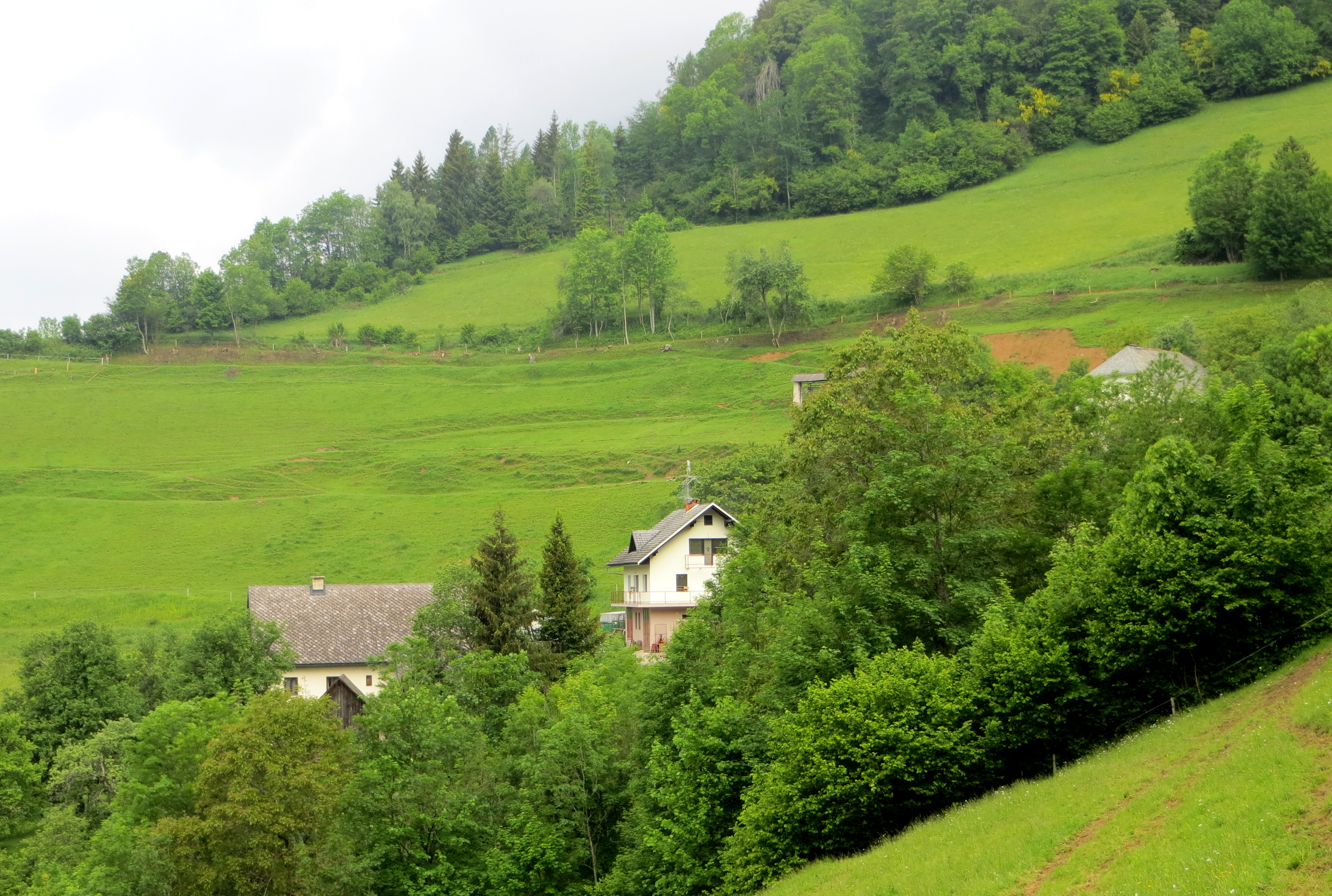

- Location in Slovenia
- Coordinates: 46°13′34.63″N 14°4′47.88″E
- Country: Slovenia
- Traditional Region: Upper Carniola
- Statistical region: Upper Carniola
- Municipality: Železniki

Area
  - Total: 2.310 km^{2} (0.892 sq mi)
- Elevation: 966.3 m (3,170 ft)

Population (2026)
  - Total: 5
  - Density: 2/km^{2} (5.2/sq mi)

Ravne (pronounced [ˈɾáːwnɛ]) is a small settlement in the Municipality of Železniki in the Upper Carniola region of Slovenia. In January 2026, the population was 5.
