= Zabrdo =

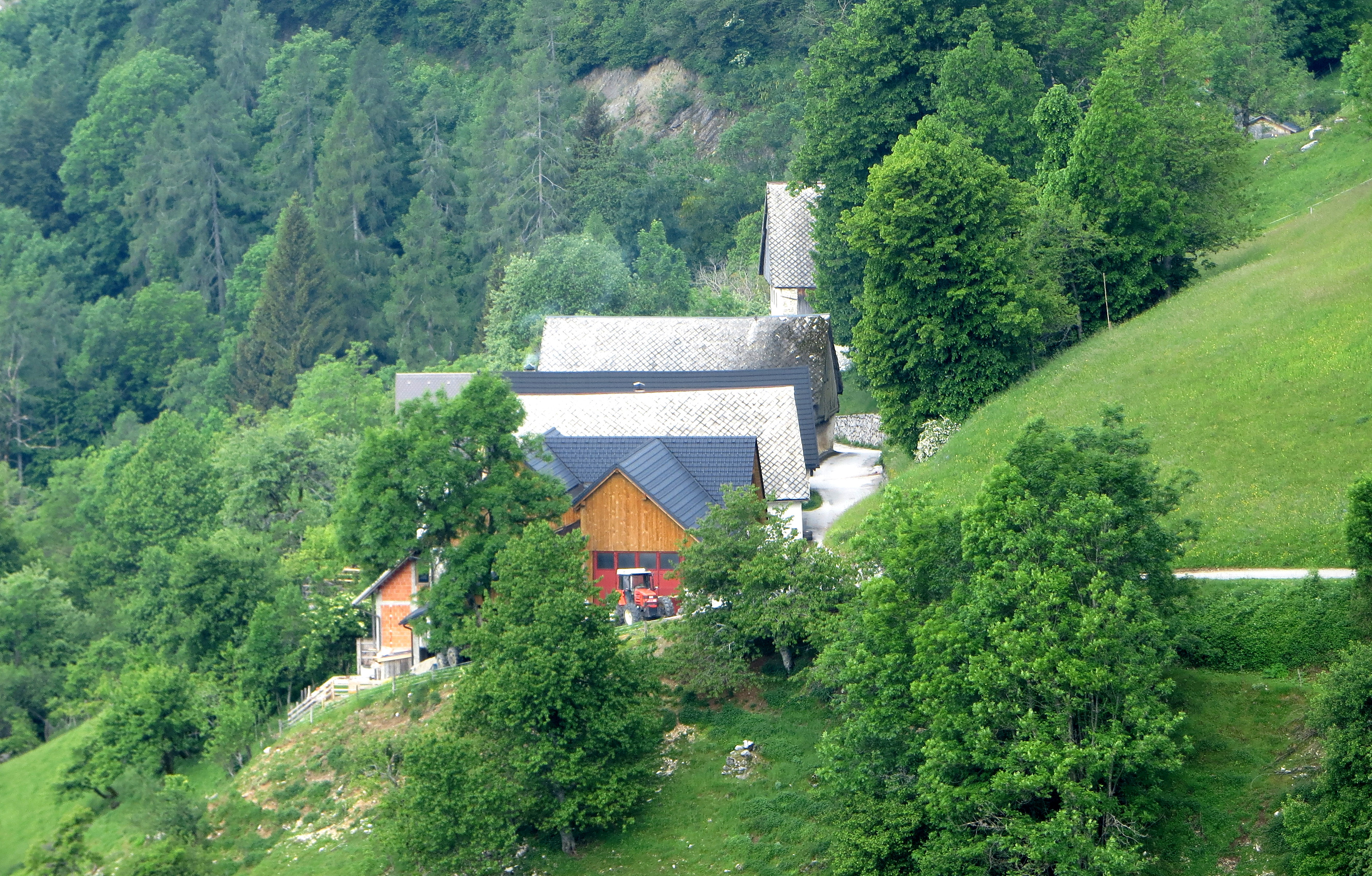

- Location in Slovenia
- Coordinates: 46°13′54.6″N 14°3′53.87″E
- Country: Slovenia
- Traditional Region: Upper Carniola
- Statistical region: Upper Carniola
- Municipality: Železniki

Area
  - Total: 1.953 km^{2} (0.754 sq mi)
- Elevation: 1,092.4 m (3,584 ft)

Population (2026)
  - Total: 9
  - Density: 5/km^{2} (13/sq mi)

Zabrdo (pronounced [zaˈbəɾːdɔ]; German: Sabrdam) is a small high-elevation settlement in the Municipality of Železniki in the Upper Carniola region of Slovenia. In January 2026, the population was 9.
