= Prtovč =

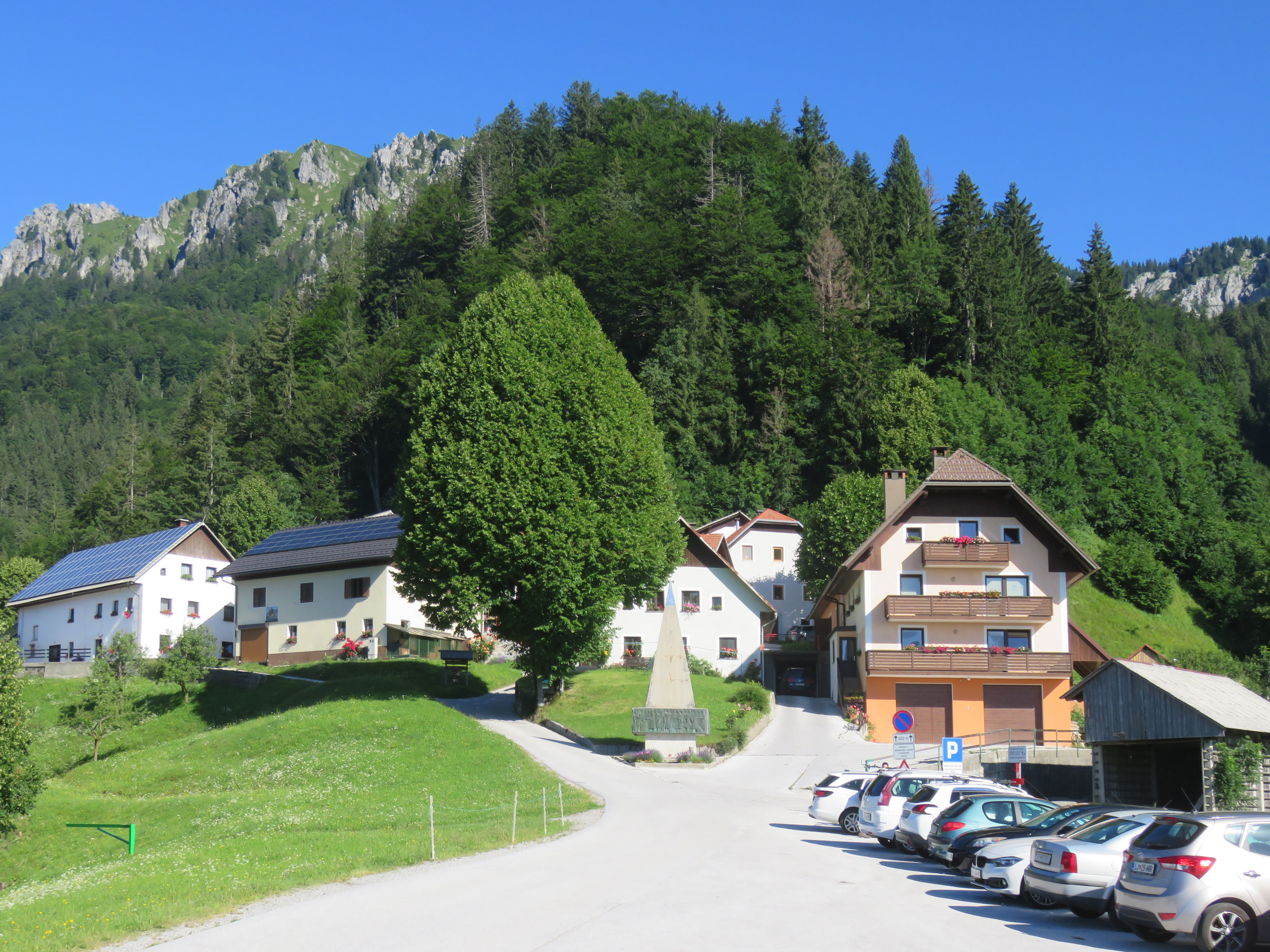

- Location in Slovenia
- Coordinates: 46°13′39.78″N 14°6′46.8″E
- Country: Slovenia
- Traditional Region: Upper Carniola
- Statistical region: Upper Carniola
- Municipality: Železniki

Area
  - Total: 4.267 km^{2} (1.647 sq mi)
- Elevation: 1,008.1 m (3,307 ft)

Population (2026)
  - Total: 14
  - Density: 3/km^{2} (7.8/sq mi)

Prtovč (pronounced [pəɾˈtoːu̯tʃ]; in older sources also Prtovič, German: Pertoutsch) is a settlement in the Municipality of Železniki in the Upper Carniola region of Slovenia. In January 2026, the population was 14.

== Church ==
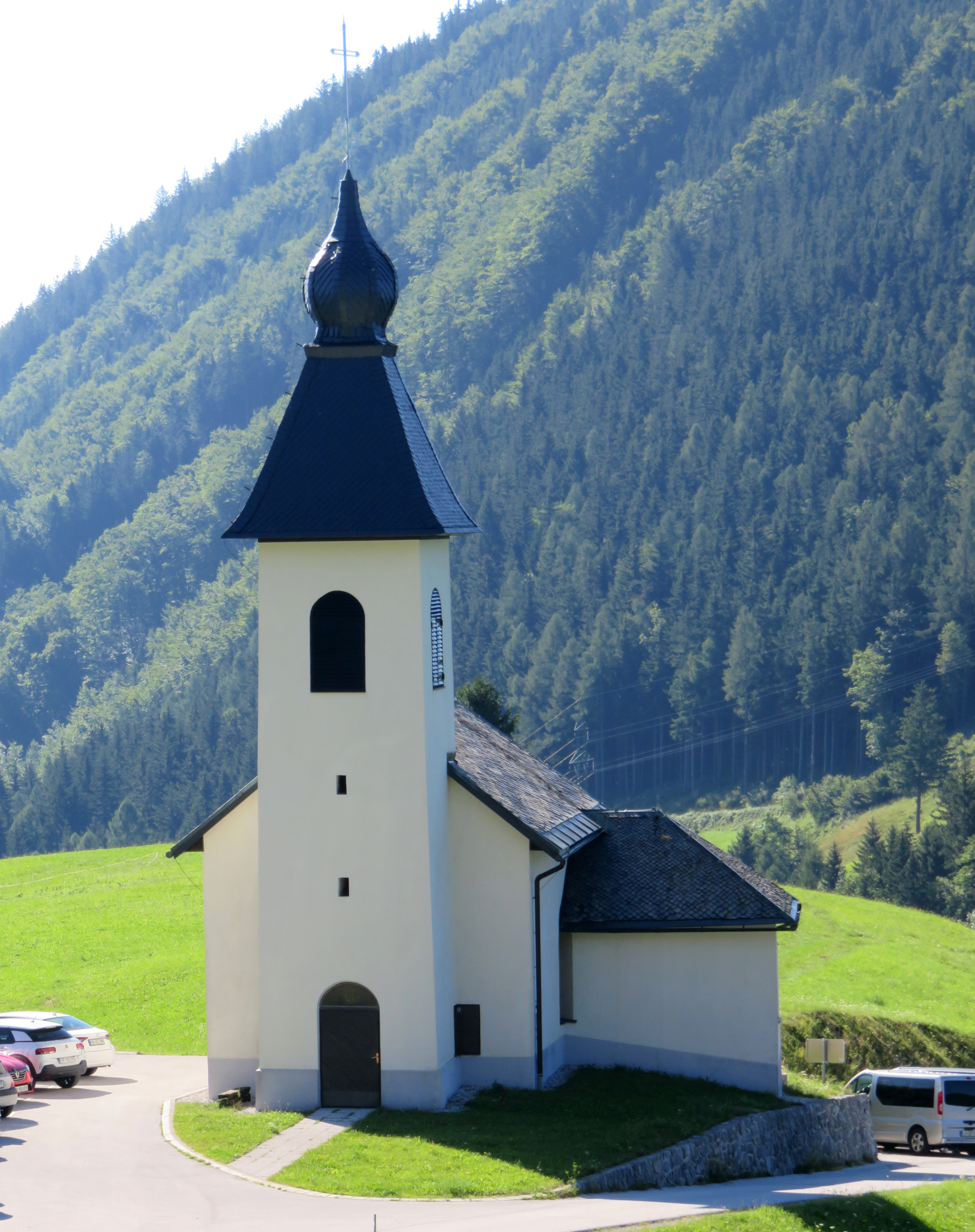
Our Lady, Help of Christians Church

The church in the settlement is dedicated to the Virgin Mary and was built in 1869 by extending an older chapel.
