= Martinj Vrh, Železniki =

Martinj Vrh
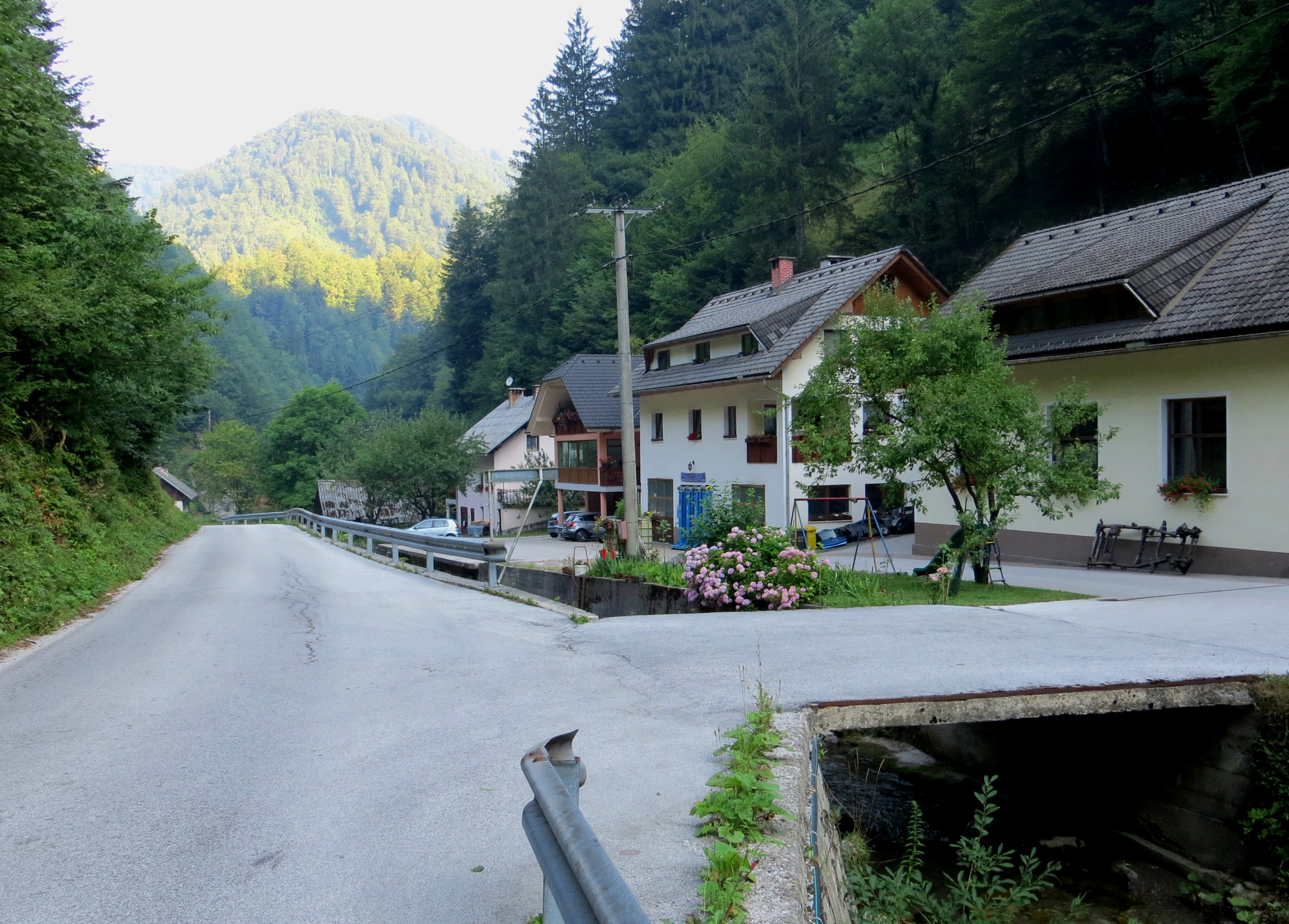

- Location in Slovenia
- Coordinates: 46°11′26.88″N 14°7′58.9″E
- Country: Slovenia
- Traditional Region: Upper Carniola
- Statistical region: Upper Carniola
- Municipality: Železniki

Area
  - Total: 11.911 km^{2} (4.599 sq mi)
- Elevation: 781.3 m (2,563 ft)

Population (2026)
  - Total: 267
  - Density: 22/km^{2} (57/sq mi)

Martinj Vrh (pronounced [maɾˈtiːɱ ˈʋəɾx]; in older sources also Sveti Martinj Vrh, German: Martinsberg) is a settlement in the Municipality of Železniki in the Upper Carniola region of Slovenia. In January 2026, the population was 267.

== Name ==
Martinj Vrh was attested in historical sources as Martingenpotoch in 1291 and 1318, and as Martinvrch in 1500.
