= Podporezen =

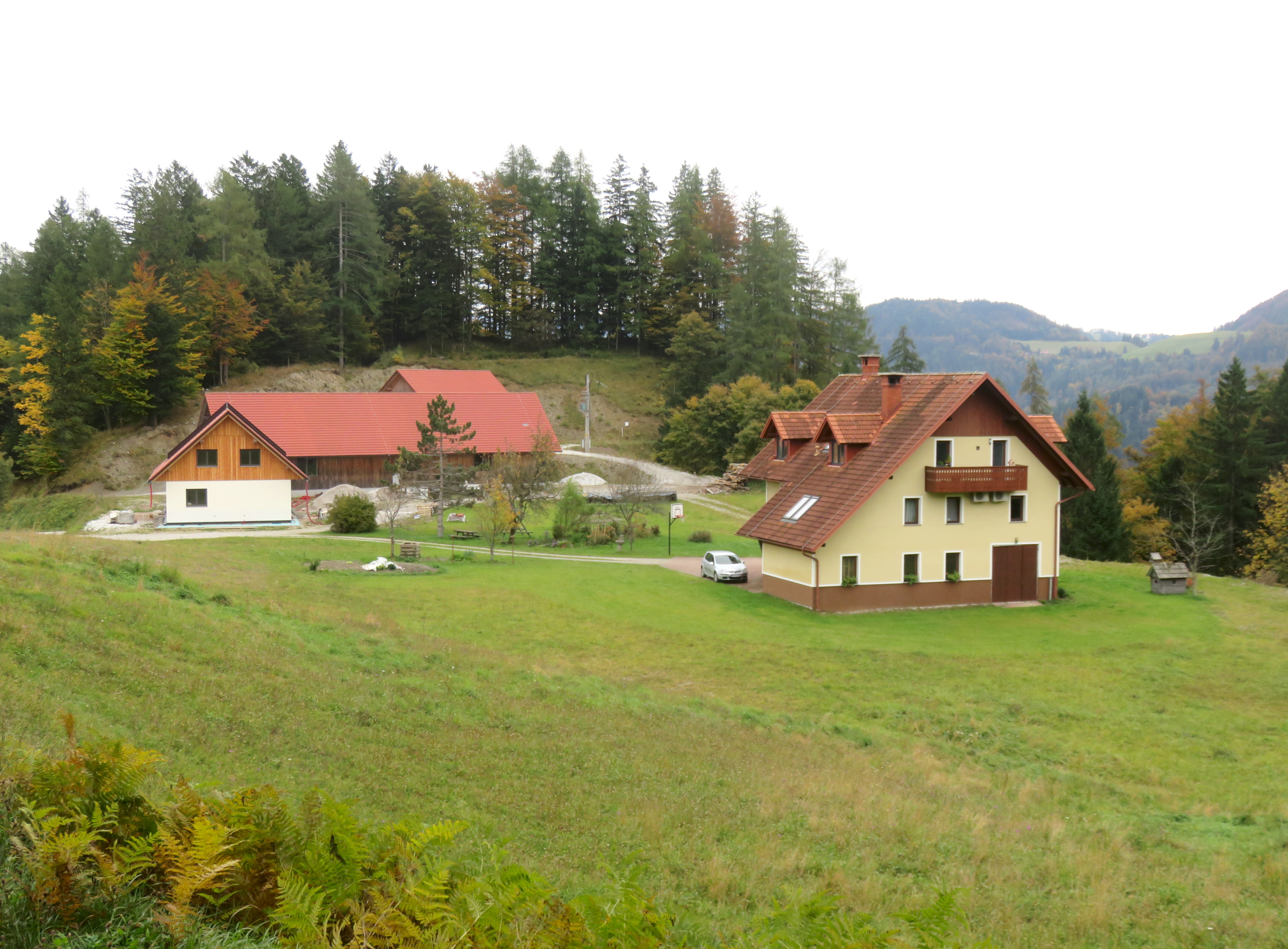

- Location in Slovenia
- Coordinates: 46°11′49.44″N 13°59′47.84″E
- Country: Slovenia
- Traditional Region: Upper Carniola
- Statistical region: Upper Carniola
- Municipality: Železniki

Area
  - Total: 4.641 km^{2} (1.792 sq mi)
- Elevation: 1,096.4 m (3,597 ft)

Population (2026)
  - Total: 10
  - Density: 2/km^{2} (5.2/sq mi)

Podporezen (pronounced [pɔtˈpoːɾɛzən]) is a small settlement in the Municipality of Železniki in the Upper Carniola region of Slovenia. In January 2026, the population was 10.
