= Studeno, Železniki =

Studeno
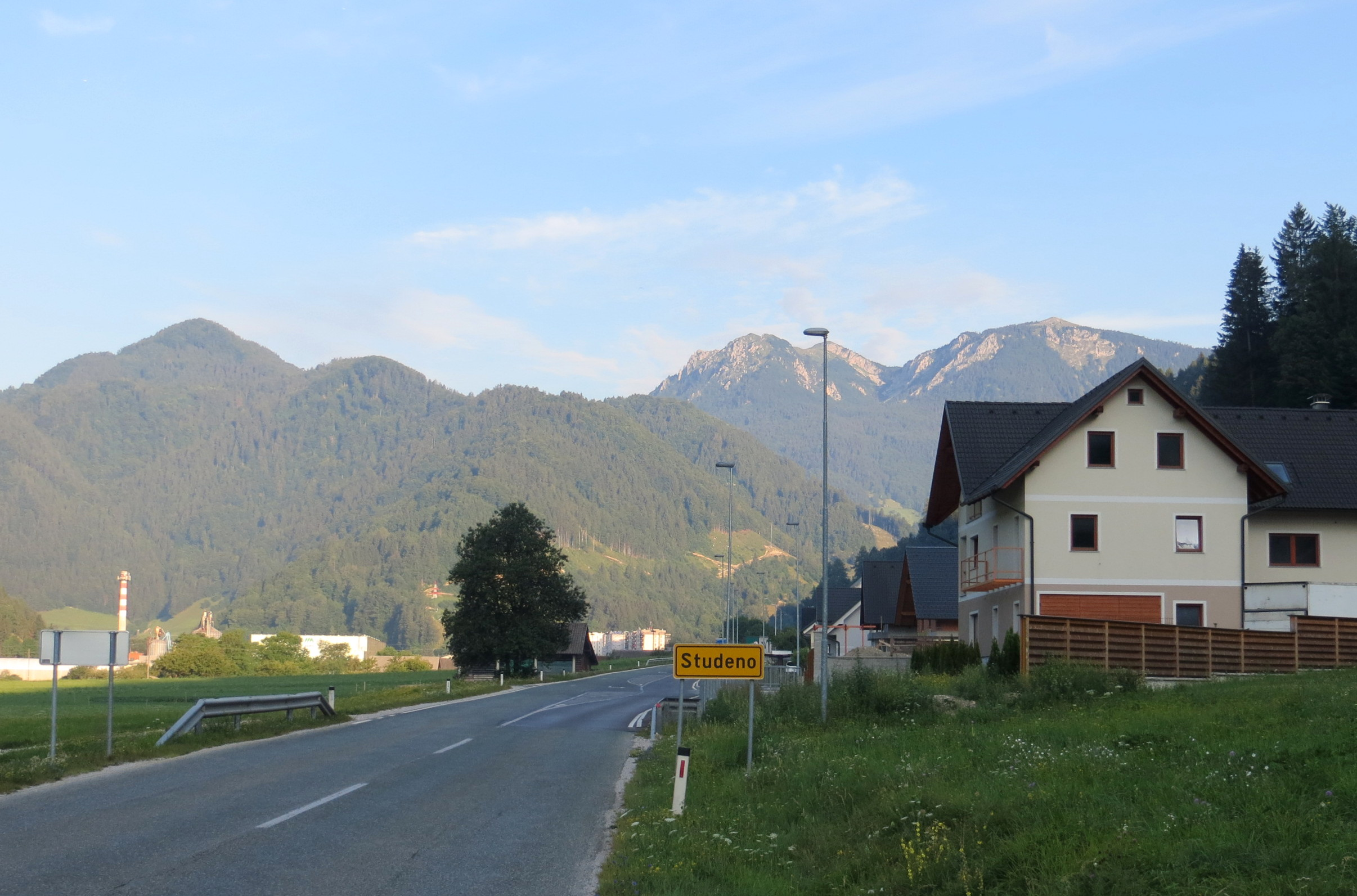

- Location in Slovenia
- Coordinates: 46°13′32.8″N 14°10′43.53″E
- Country: Slovenia
- Traditional Region: Upper Carniola
- Statistical region: Upper Carniola
- Municipality: Železniki

Area
  - Total: 2.906 km^{2} (1.122 sq mi)
- Elevation: 442.8 m (1,453 ft)

Population (2026)
  - Total: 222
  - Density: 76/km^{2} (200/sq mi)

Studeno (pronounced [stuˈdeːnɔ]) is a settlement in the Municipality of Železniki in the Upper Carniola region of Slovenia. Building expansion has resulted in it becoming virtually part of the town of Železniki. In January 2026, the population was 222.
