= Ojstri Vrh =

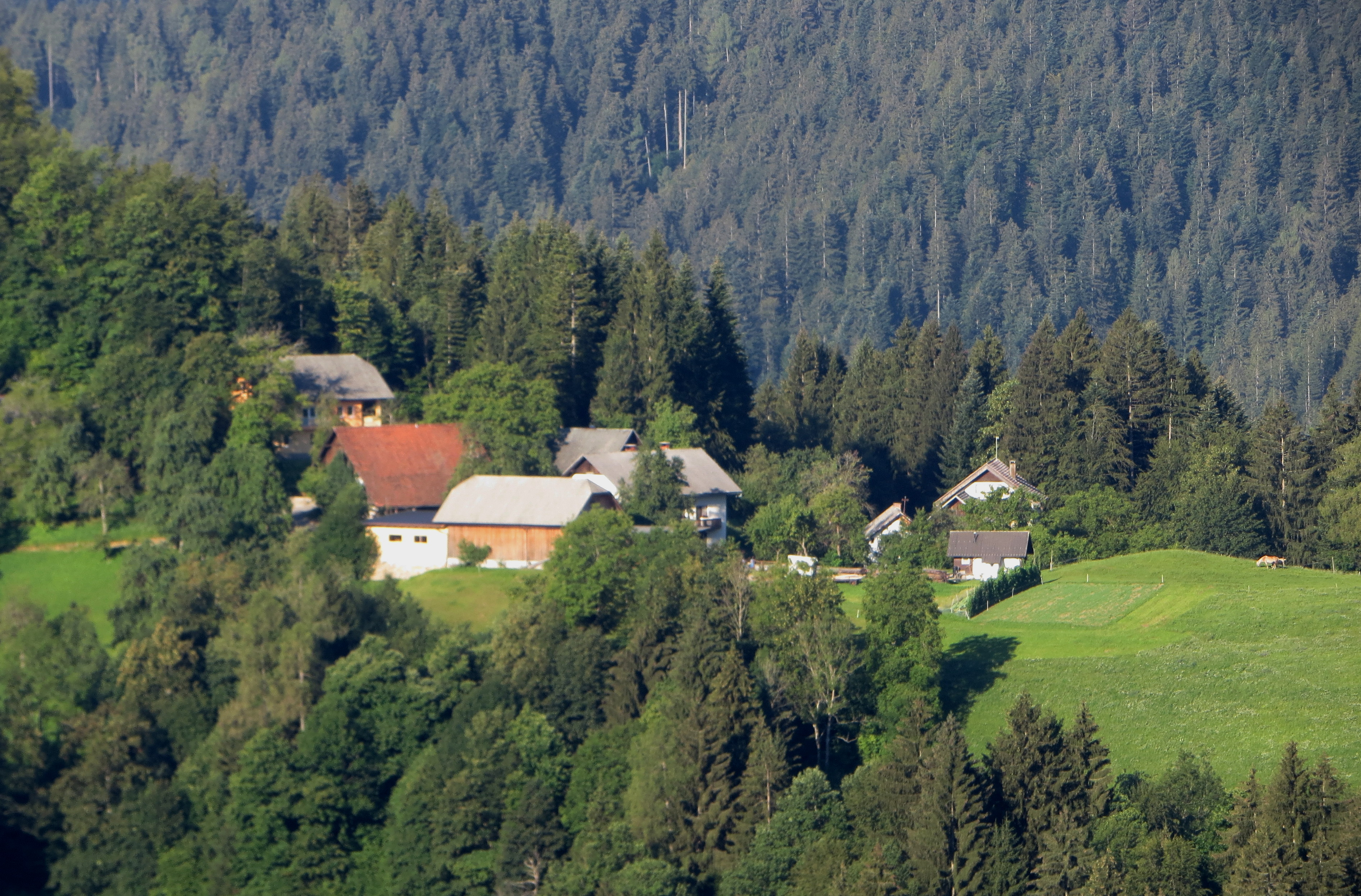

- Location in Slovenia
- Coordinates: 46°12′7.28″N 14°10′42.47″E
- Country: Slovenia
- Traditional Region: Upper Carniola
- Statistical region: Upper Carniola
- Municipality: Železniki

Area
  - Total: 2.115 km^{2} (0.817 sq mi)
- Elevation: 756.7 m (2,483 ft)

Population (2026)
  - Total: 65
  - Density: 31/km^{2} (80/sq mi)

Ojstri Vrh (pronounced [ˈoːi̯stɾi ˈʋəɾx]) is a settlement in the Municipality of Železniki in the Upper Carniola region of Slovenia. In January 2026, the population was 65.

== Name ==
Ojstri Vrh was attested in historical sources as Oztriwarch in 1291, Osterwerch in 1457, Osterwarch in 1484, and Osterenburch in 1500, among other spellings.
