= Smoleva =

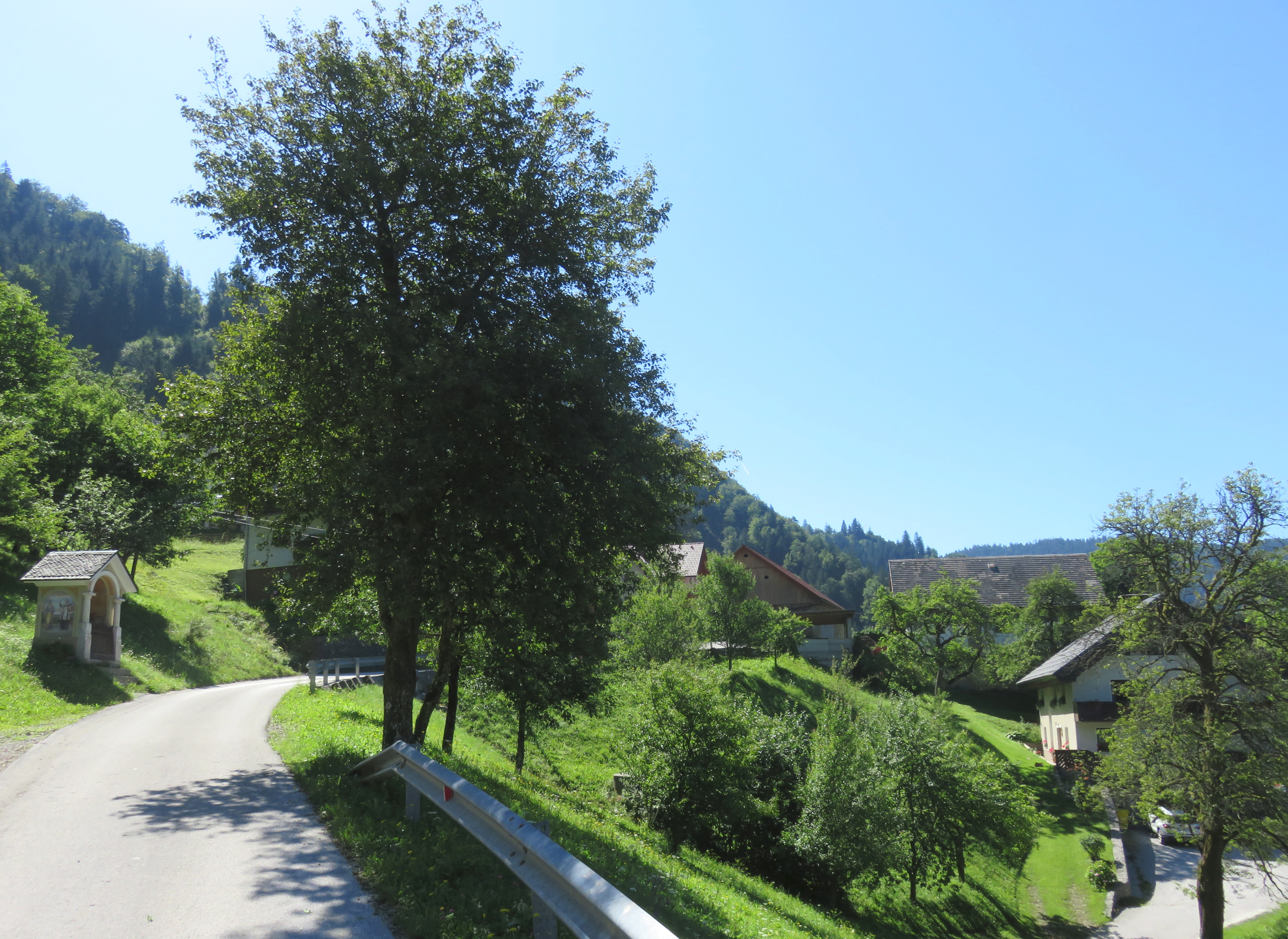

- Location in Slovenia
- Coordinates: 46°12′39.99″N 14°9′57.19″E
- Country: Slovenia
- Traditional Region: Upper Carniola
- Statistical region: Upper Carniola
- Municipality: Železniki

Area
  - Total: 1.831 km^{2} (0.707 sq mi)
- Elevation: 591.8 m (1,942 ft)

Population (2026)
  - Total: 54
  - Density: 30/km^{2} (78/sq mi)

Smoleva (pronounced [smɔˈleːʋa]) is a village in the Municipality of Železniki in the Upper Carniola region of Slovenia. It lies in the valley of Lower Smoleva Creek (Slovene: Prednja Smoleva) between Špik Hill (882 meters or 2,894 feet) to the northeast and Mount Vancovec (1,085 meters or 3,560 feet) to the southwest. In January 2026, the population was 54.
