= Zali Log =

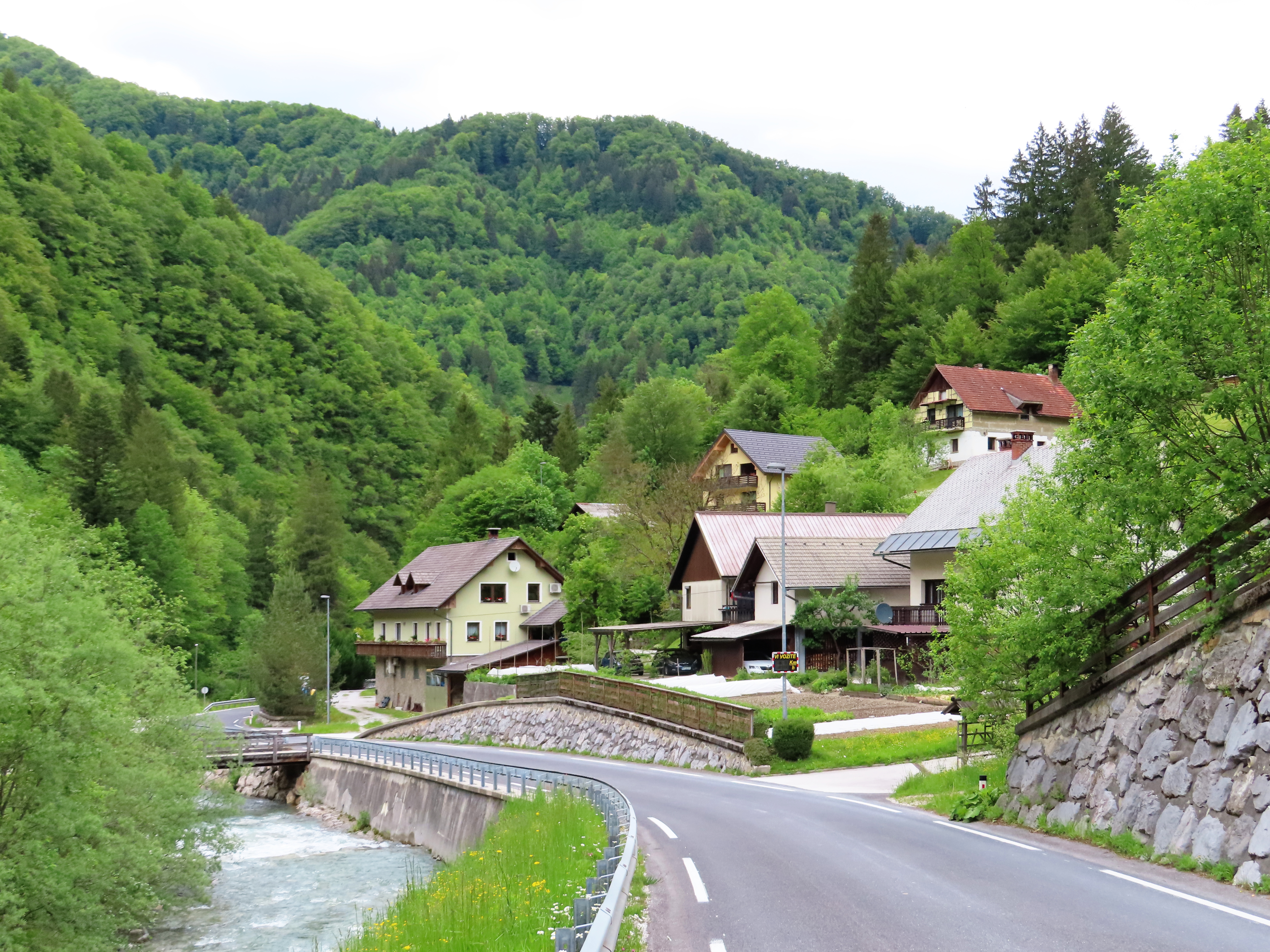

- Location in Slovenia
- Coordinates: 46°12′23.66″N 14°6′4.17″E
- Country: Slovenia
- Traditional Region: Upper Carniola
- Statistical region: Upper Carniola
- Municipality: Železniki

Area
  - Total: 8.197 km^{2} (3.165 sq mi)
- Elevation: 526.8 m (1,728 ft)

Population (2026)
  - Total: 209
  - Density: 26/km^{2} (67/sq mi)

Zali Log (pronounced [ˈzaːli ˈloːk]; German: Salilog) is a village in the Municipality of Železniki in the Upper Carniola region of Slovenia. In January 2026, the population was 209.

== Name ==
Zali Log was attested in historical sources as Stubem in 1485–1490, Stuben in 1500, and Salemlogu in 1500. The name is derived from *Zъ̀lъjь lǫ̂gъ in the sense of 'bad (marshy) meadow' (cf. Hudi Log for a toponym with a similar semantic motivation).

== History ==
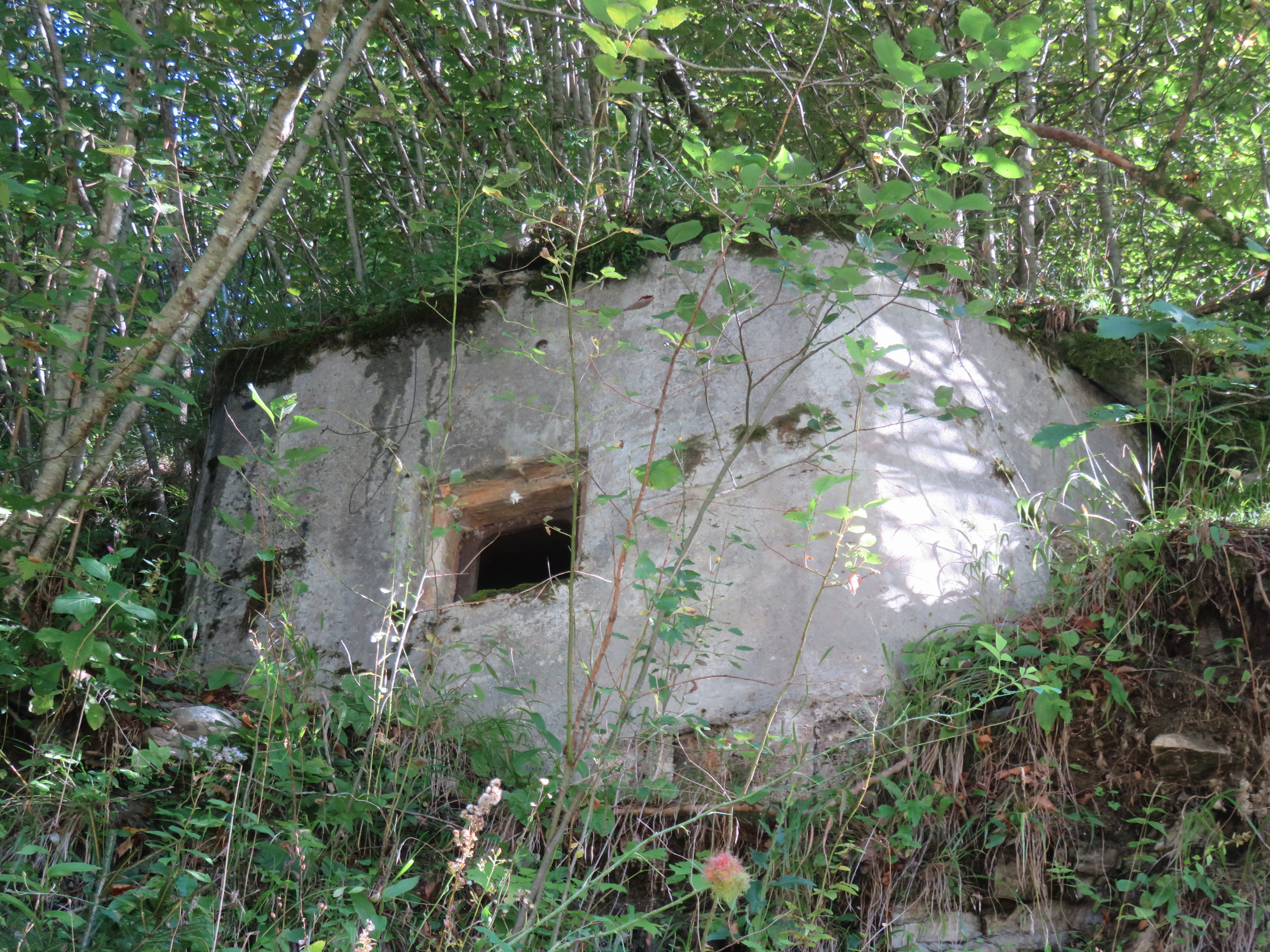
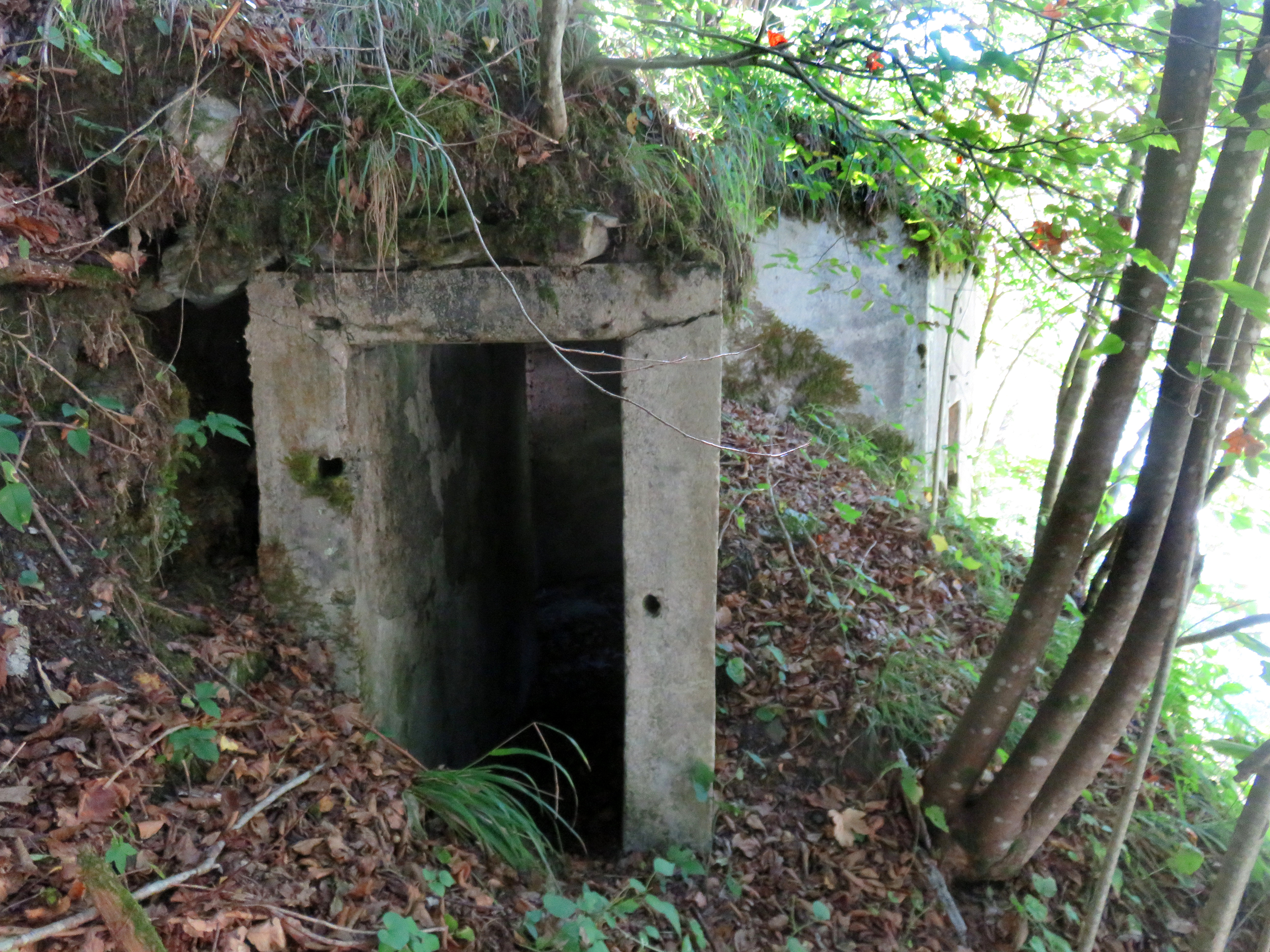
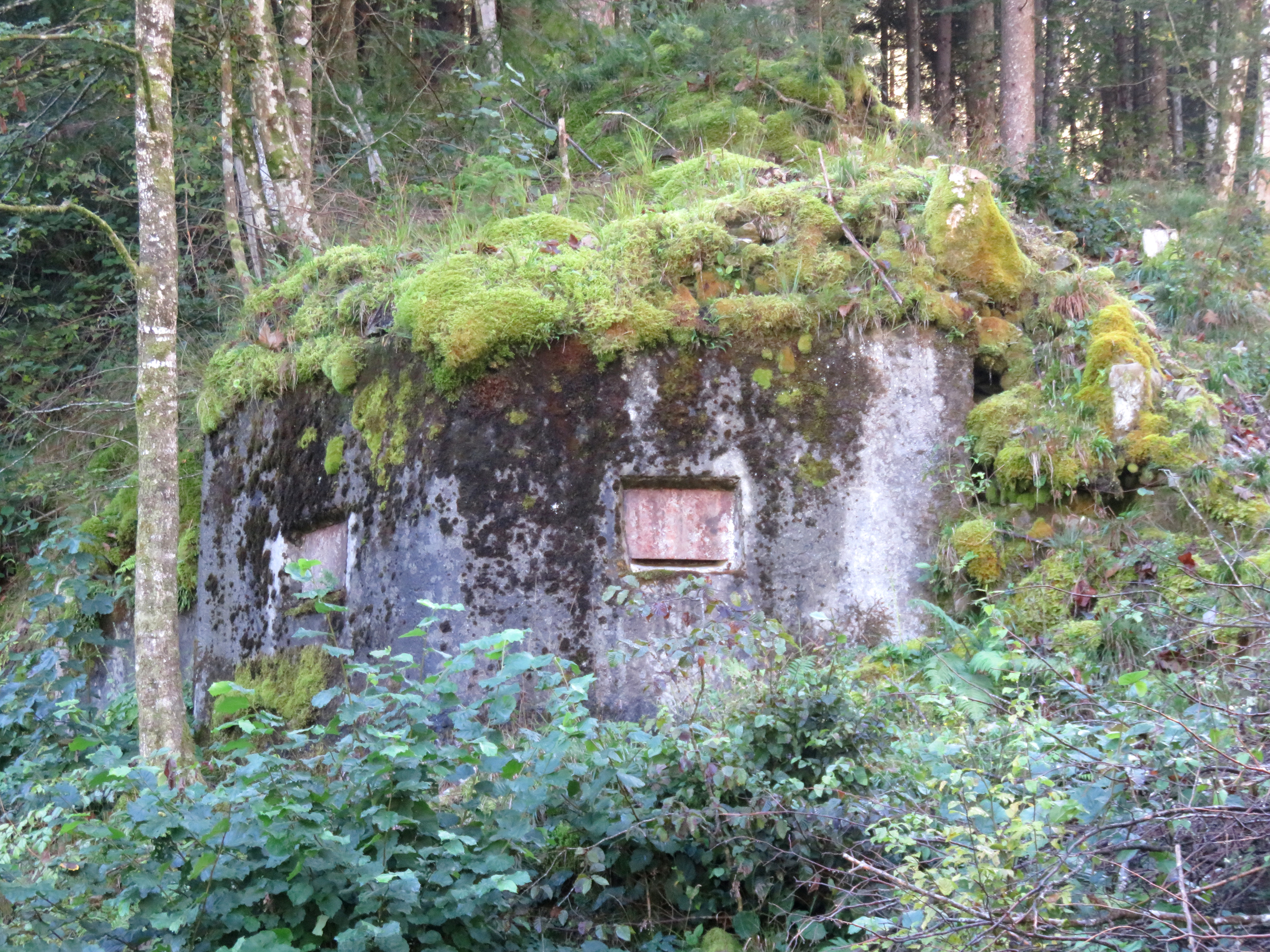
Rupnik Line pillboxes in Zali Log

Zali Log is a relatively recent settlement. In the 14th century, Tyroleans settled the area, establishing the village of Micheltal on the southern slope of Mount Groblje (elevation: 1,086 meters or 3,563 feet), where there are now hay meadows. They soon left the higer elevations and founded the village of Ka Stuben, where today's village of Zali Log is located.

During the interwar period, Zali Log was on the Yugoslav side of the Rapallo border between Italy and Yugoslavia. Between 1937 and 1941, Yugoslavia constructed a series of fortifications and weapons installations known as the Rupnik Line, part of which ran through the territory of Zali Log. Various machine-gunner pillboxes are preserved along the southern slope of Mount Groblje and along the Davča River in the southeastern part of Zali Log.

== Churches ==
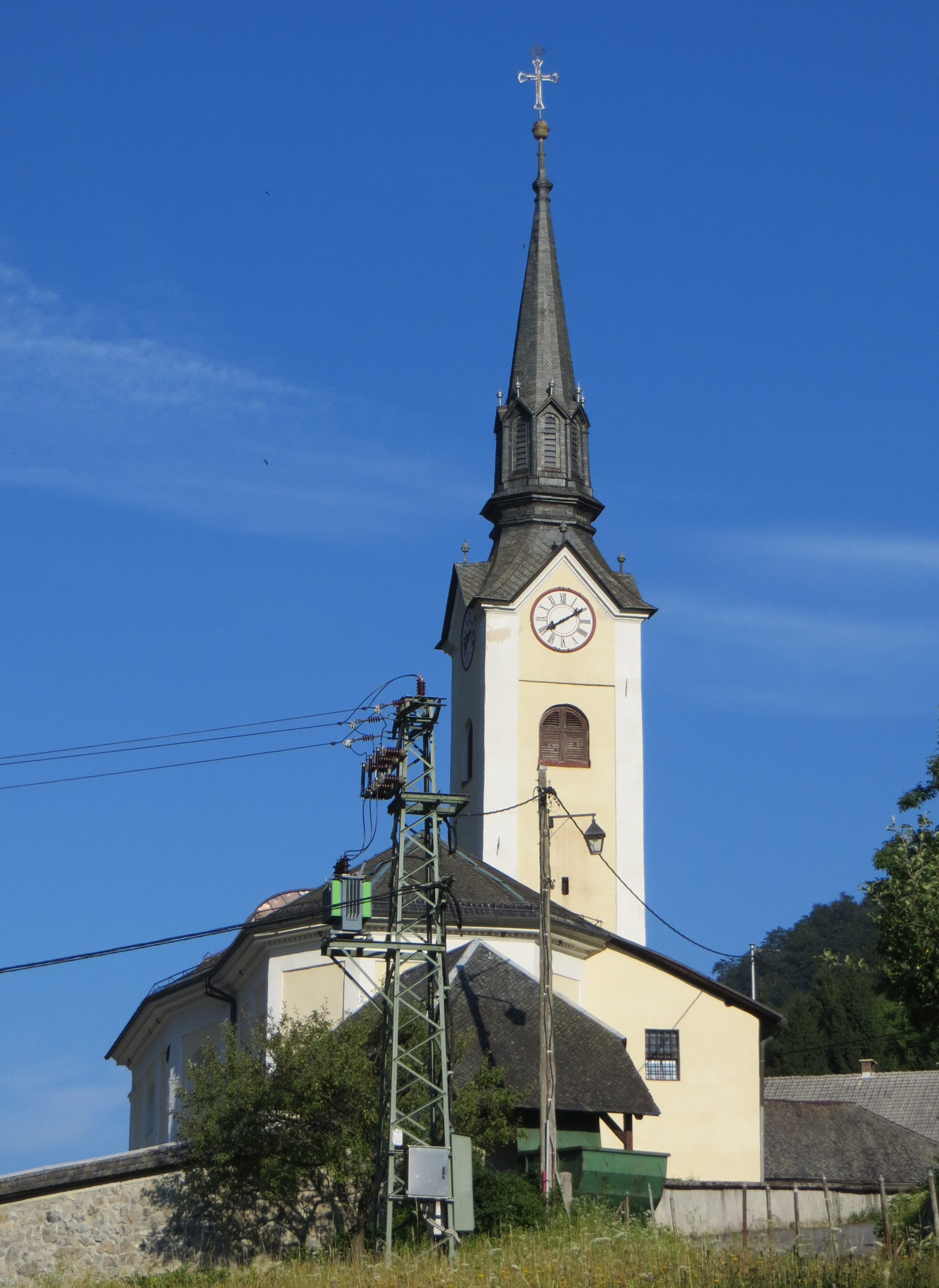
Assumption Church

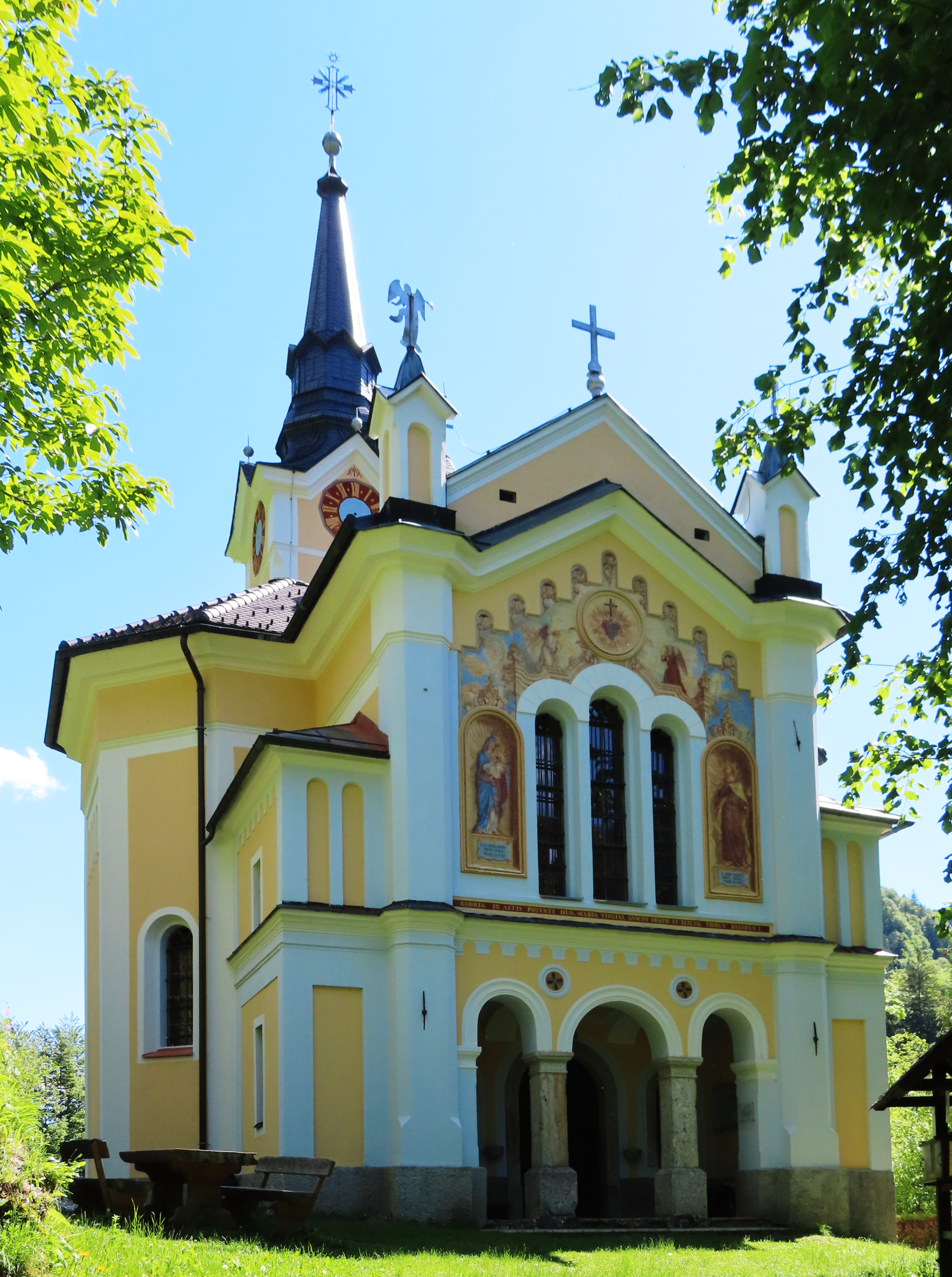
Our Lady of Loreto Church

The parish church in Zali Log dedicated to the Assumption of Mary. It is an originally Gothic church, redesigned in the Baroque style in the 1740s. It contains a ceiling fresco by Janez Gosar and an altar painting by Janez Wolf. A second church stands on Suša Hill east of the settlement. It is dedicated to Our Lady of Loreto and was built from 1875 to 1876 where a wayside shrine formerly stood. It was built in the Renaissance Revival style and was designed by Franc Faleschini.

== Gallery ==
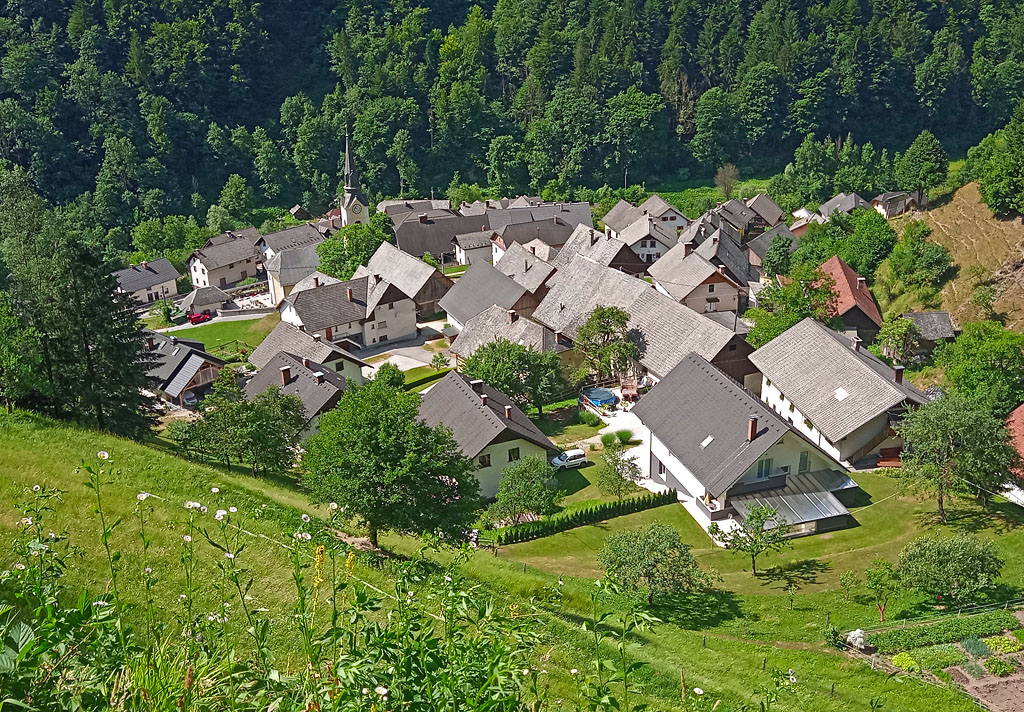
Zali Log
