= Zabrekve =

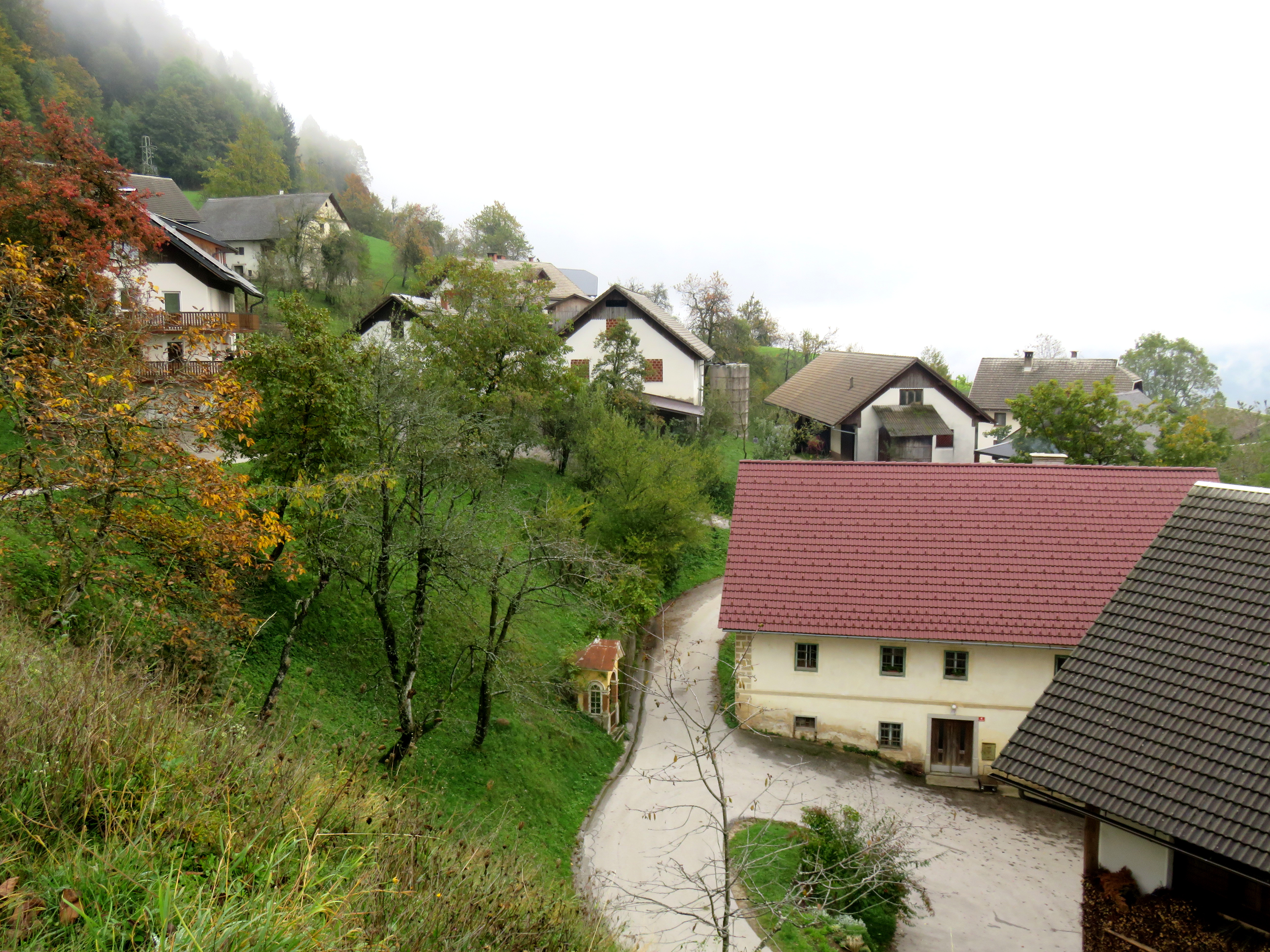

- Location in Slovenia
- Coordinates: 46°14′8.61″N 14°14′12.16″E
- Country: Slovenia
- Traditional Region: Upper Carniola
- Statistical region: Upper Carniola
- Municipality: Železniki

Area
  - Total: 1.922 km^{2} (0.742 sq mi)
- Elevation: 822.2 m (2,698 ft)

Population (2026)
  - Total: 67
  - Density: 35/km^{2} (91/sq mi)

Zabrekve (pronounced [zaˈbɾeːkʋɛ]) is a settlement in the Municipality of Železniki in the Upper Carniola region of Slovenia. It includes the hamlets of Sveti Mohor (Sankt Hermagor) and Bezovnica. In January 2026, the population was 67.

== History ==
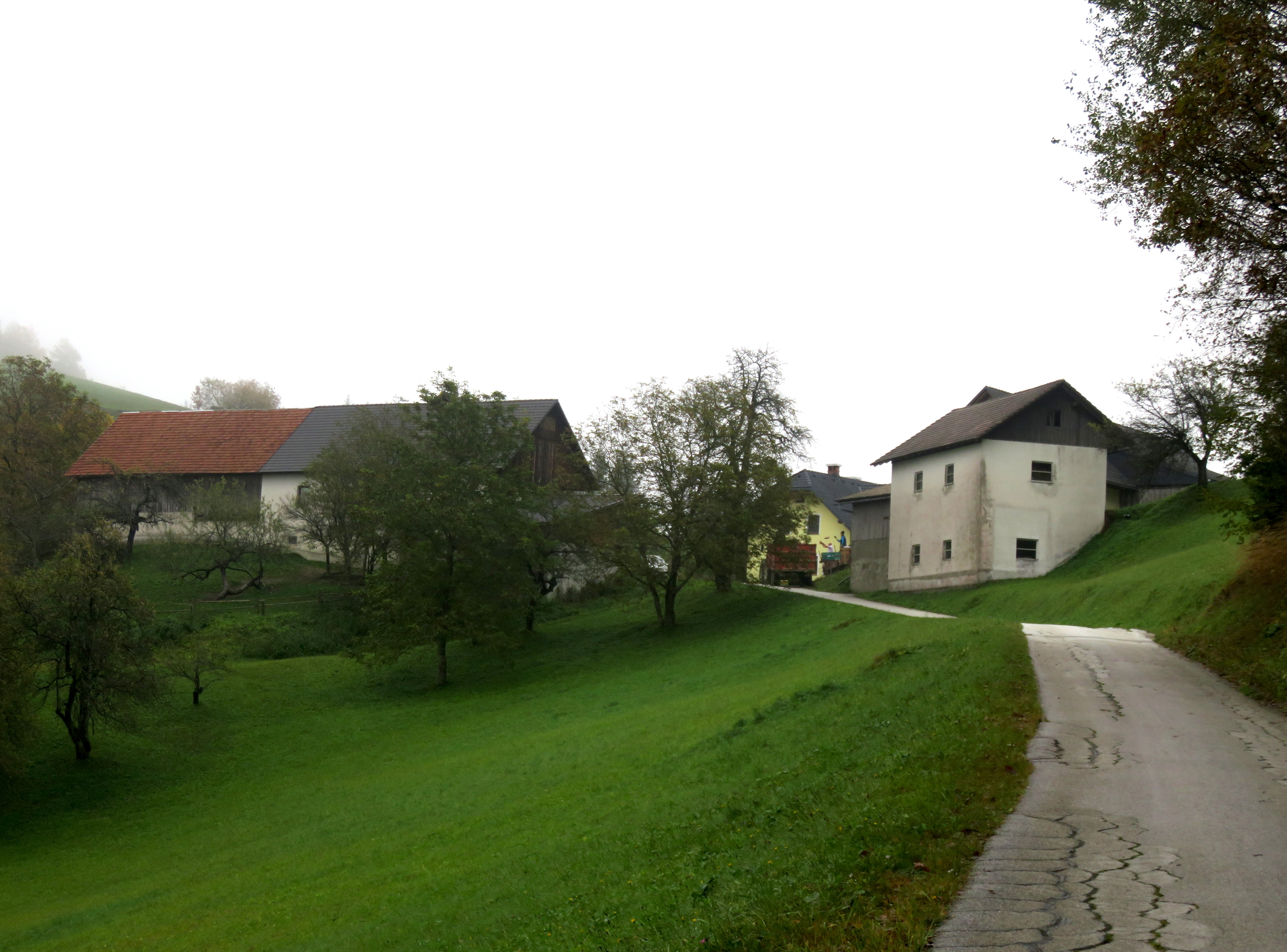
The hamlet of Bezovnica

During the Second World War, the Partisans burned the hamlet of Bezovnica on 10 March 1945.

== Church ==
The local church is dedicated to Saints Hermagoras and Fortunatus and was rebuilt in 1973. The original Baroque church was dynamited in the spring of 1944 or in March 1945 and the surviving bell tower burned down in 1972 after being struck by lightning.

== Gallery ==
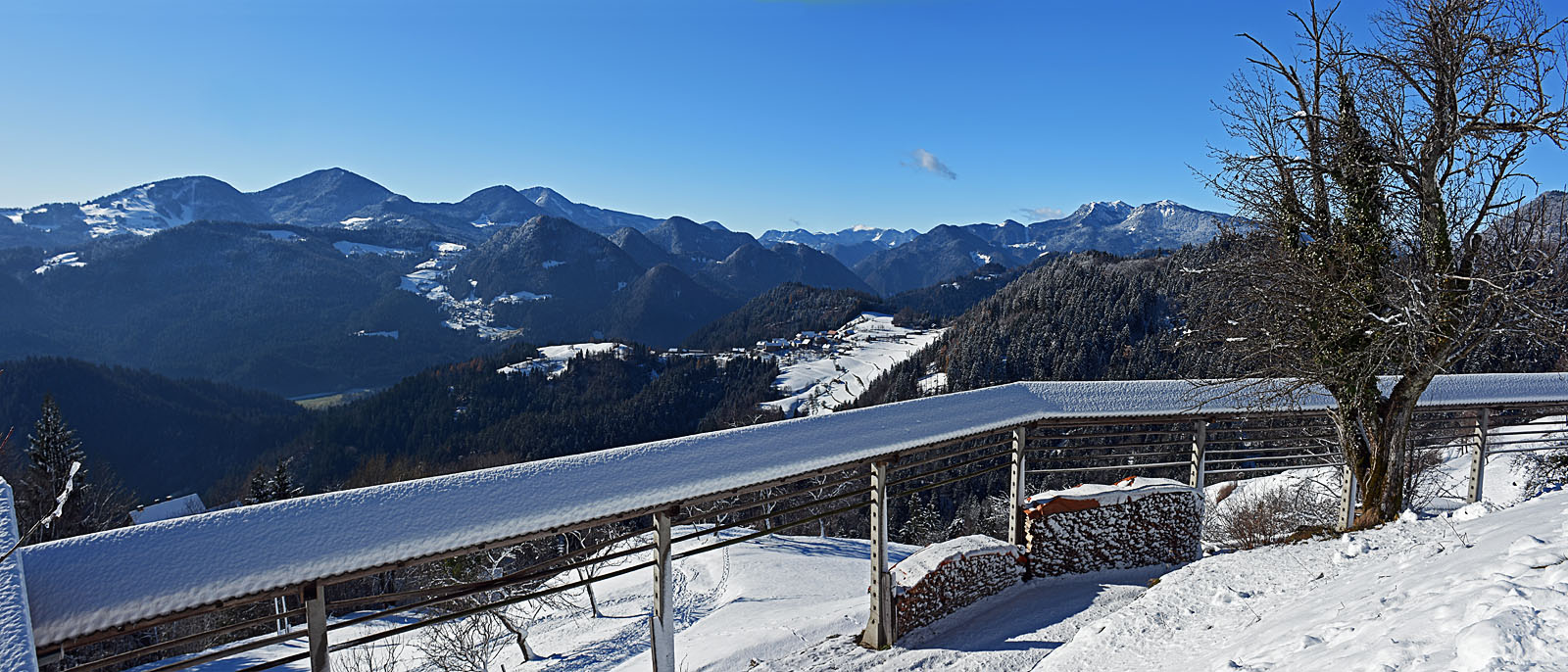
Hay rack in Zabrekve and view to the west
