= Lajše, Železniki =

Lajše Selške Lajše (1953–1998)
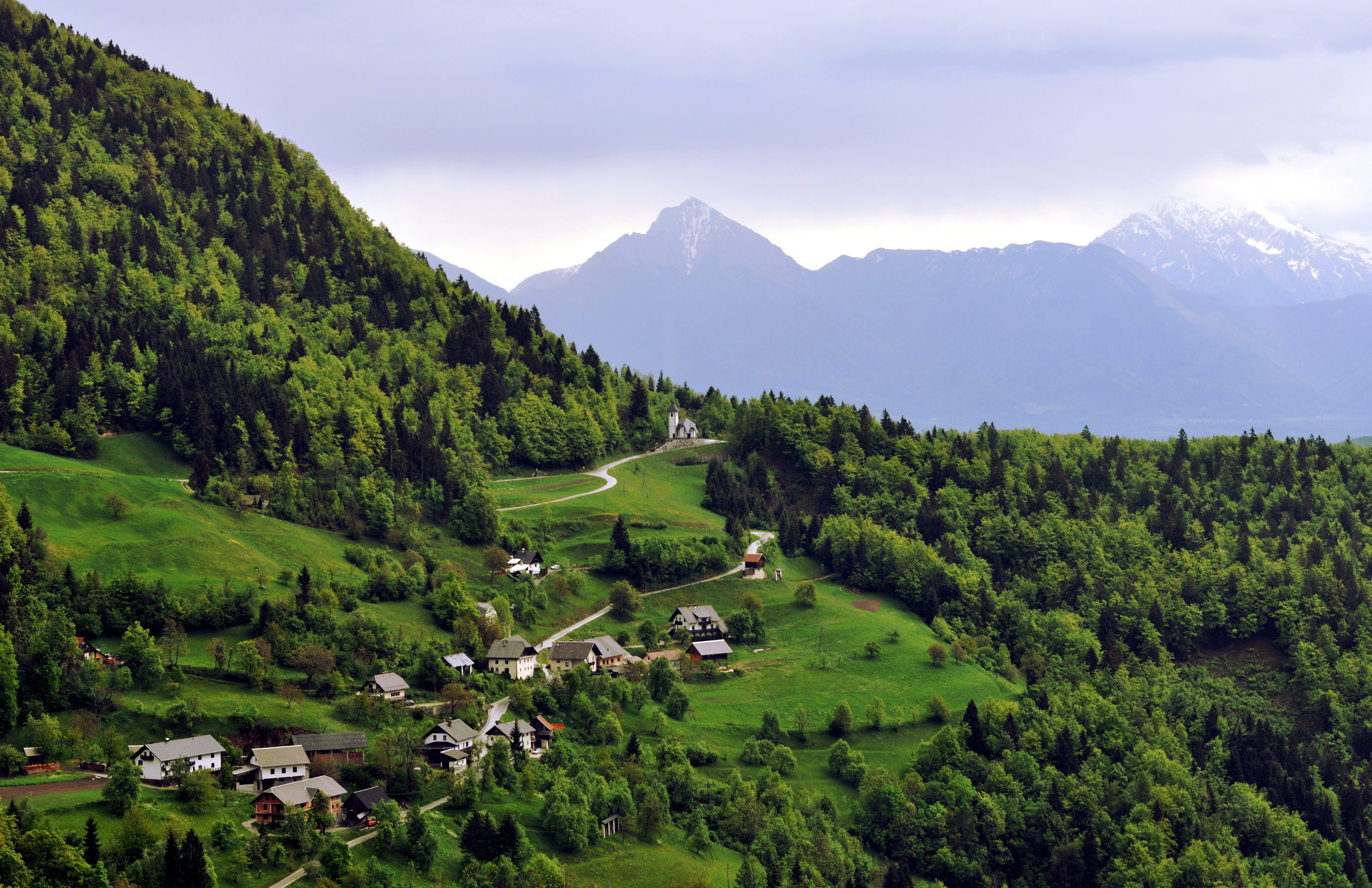

- Location in Slovenia
- Coordinates: 46°14′36.68″N 14°11′38.6″E
- Country: Slovenia
- Traditional Region: Upper Carniola
- Statistical region: Upper Carniola
- Municipality: Železniki

Area
  - Total: 2.056 km^{2} (0.794 sq mi)
- Elevation: 651.6 m (2,138 ft)

Population (2026)
  - Total: 120
  - Density: 58/km^{2} (150/sq mi)

Lajše (pronounced [ˈlaːi̯ʃɛ]) is a settlement in the Municipality of Železniki in the Upper Carniola region of Slovenia. In January 2026, the population was 120.

== Name ==
The name of the settlement was changed from Lajše to Selške Lajše in 1953. The name Lajše was restored in 1998.

== Church ==
The local church is dedicated to Saint Gertrude.
