= Zala, Železniki =

Zala
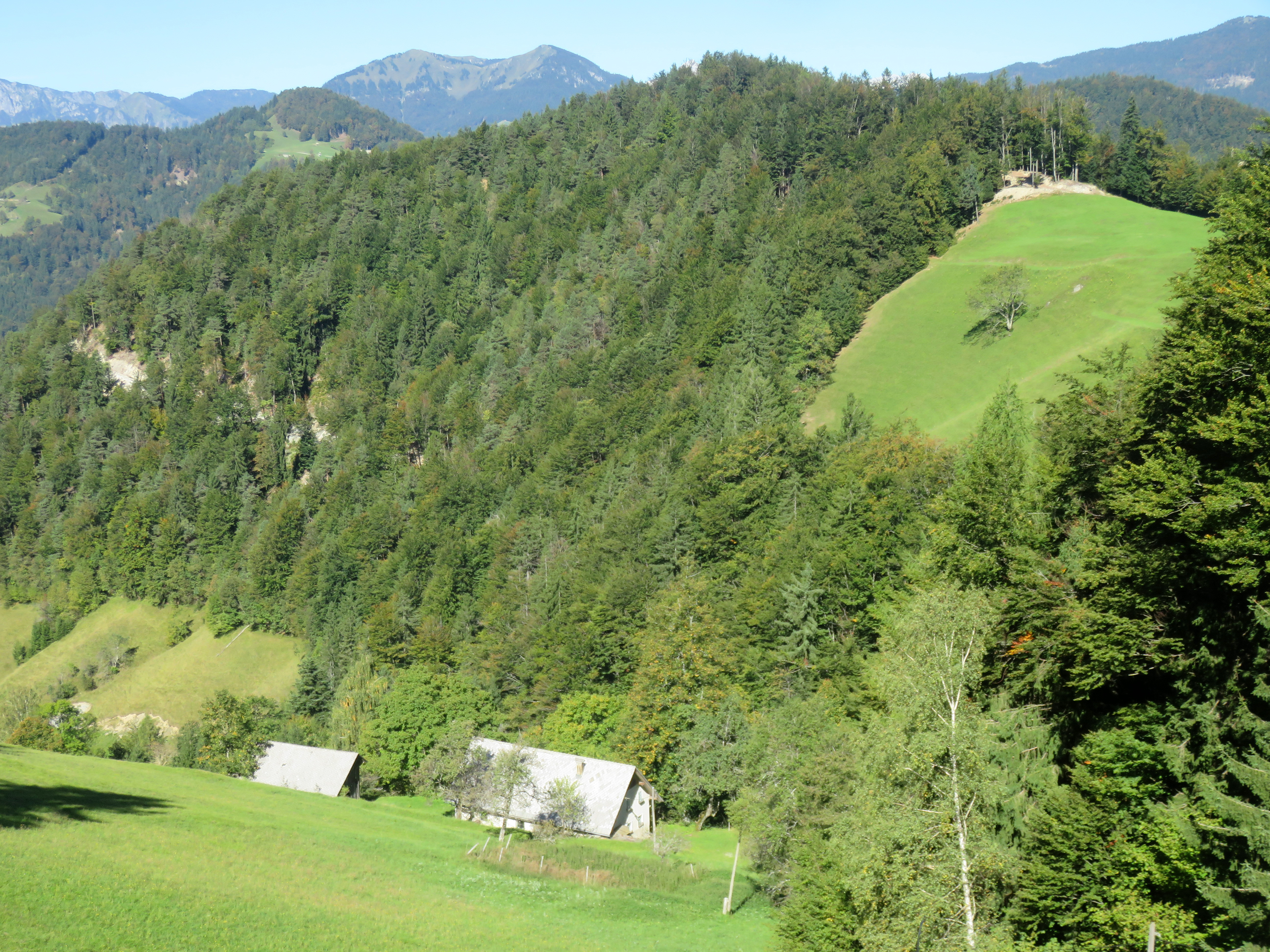

- Location in Slovenia
- Coordinates: 46°11′8.1″N 14°5′12.24″E
- Country: Slovenia
- Traditional Region: Upper Carniola
- Statistical region: Upper Carniola
- Municipality: Železniki

Area
  - Total: 1.130 km^{2} (0.436 sq mi)
- Elevation: 917.4 m (3,010 ft)

Population (2026)
  - Total: 0
  - Density: 0/km^{2} (0/sq mi)

Zala (pronounced [ˈzaːla]) is a settlement in the Municipality of Železniki in the Upper Carniola region of Slovenia. It no longer has any permanent residents.

== Quarries ==
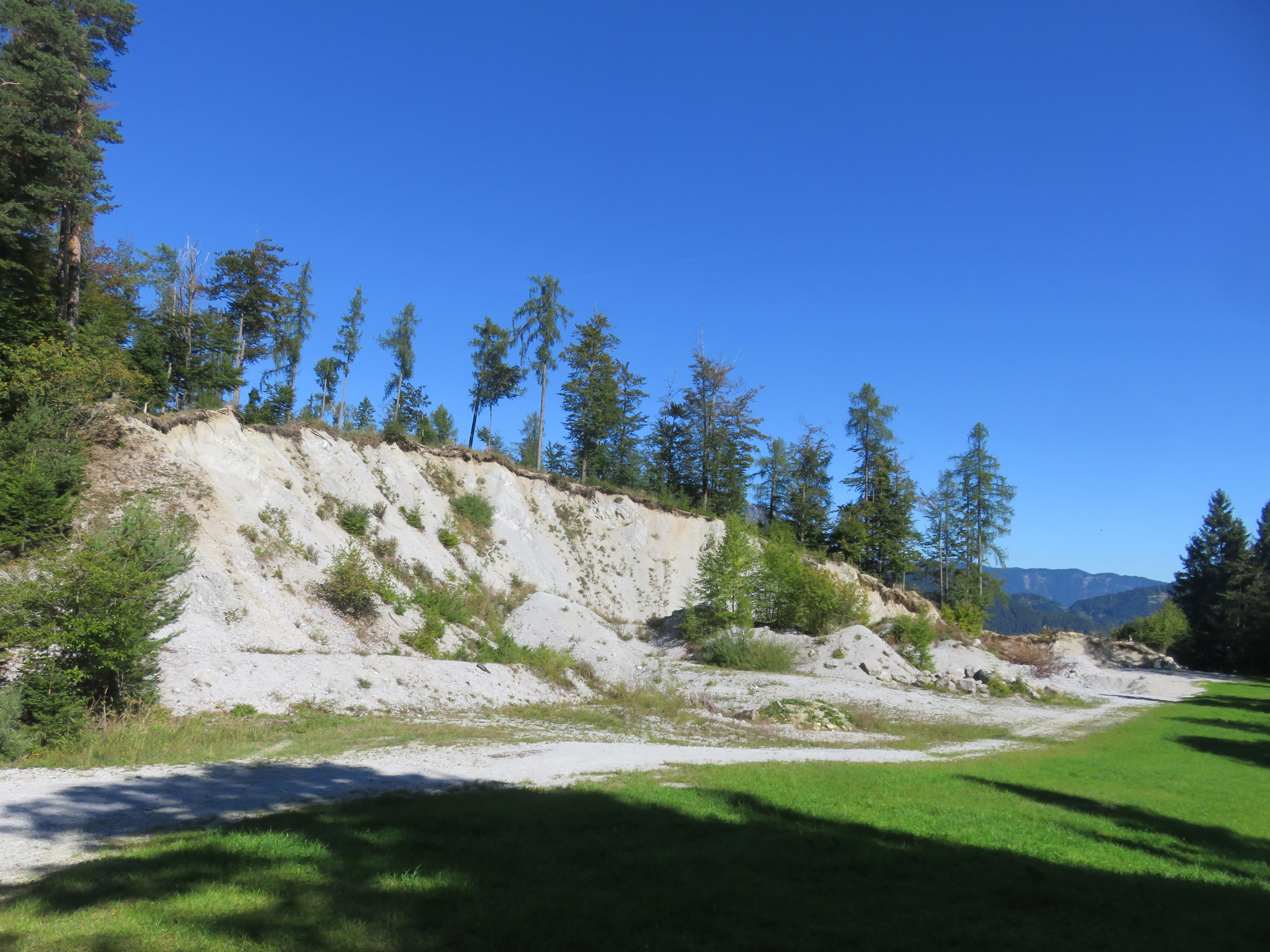
Gravel pit east of Zala

The Zala Quarry (Slovene: Kamnolom Zala) is located west of the settlement and produces gravel. There is a smaller gravel pit east of the settlement.
