= Spodnje Danje =

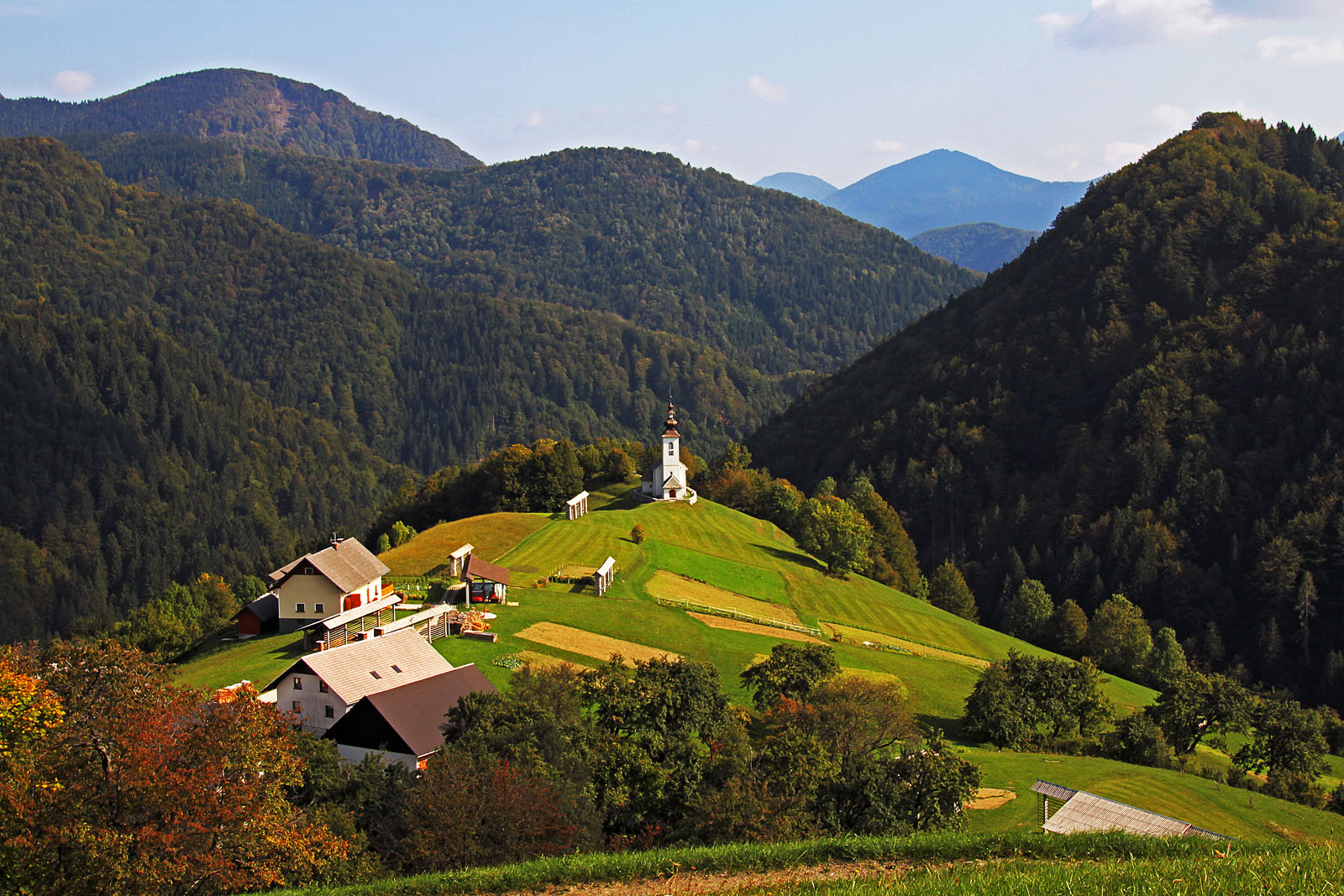

- Location in Slovenia
- Coordinates: 46°13′41.68″N 14°2′39.42″E
- Country: Slovenia
- Traditional Region: Upper Carniola
- Statistical region: Upper Carniola
- Municipality: Železniki

Area
  - Total: 2.660 km^{2} (1.027 sq mi)
- Elevation: 895.6 m (2,938 ft)

Population (2026)
  - Total: 44
  - Density: 17/km^{2} (44/sq mi)

Spodnje Danje (pronounced [ˈspoːdnjɛ ˈdaːnjɛ]; in older sources also Spodnje Dajne, German: Unterdaine) is a village in the Municipality of Železniki in the Upper Carniola region of Slovenia. In January 2026, the population was 44.

== Church ==
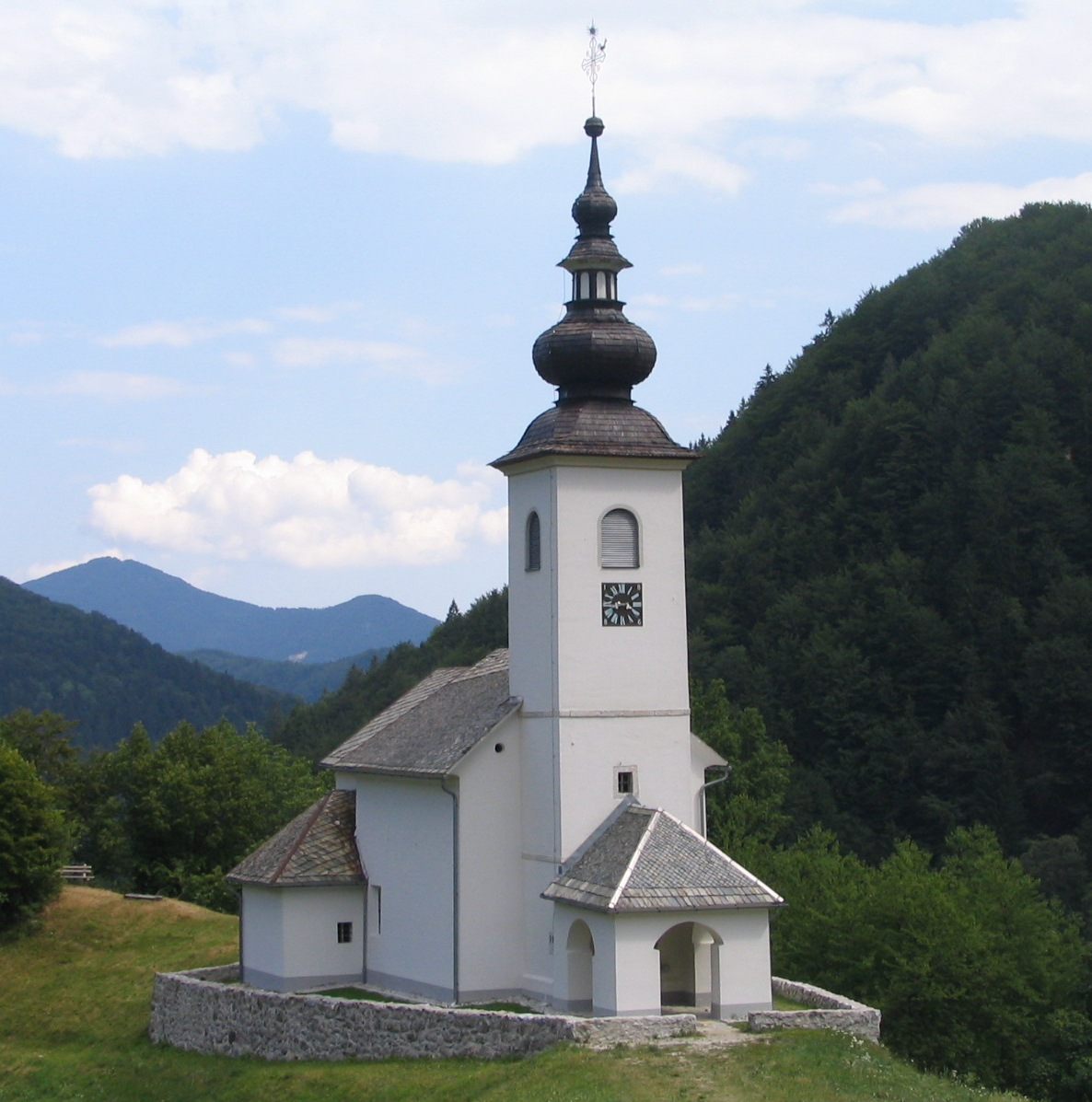
St. Mark's Church

The church in the village is dedicated to Saint Mark. It is originally a late Gothic structure from the 16th century that was reworked in the Baroque style in the 18th century, and the nave was vaulted in 1863. The main altar in the church dates from 1739 (with older statuary), and the side altars date from the end of the 18th century. The chancel contains frescoes painted by Simon Ogrin in 1910.
