= Potok, Železniki =

Potok
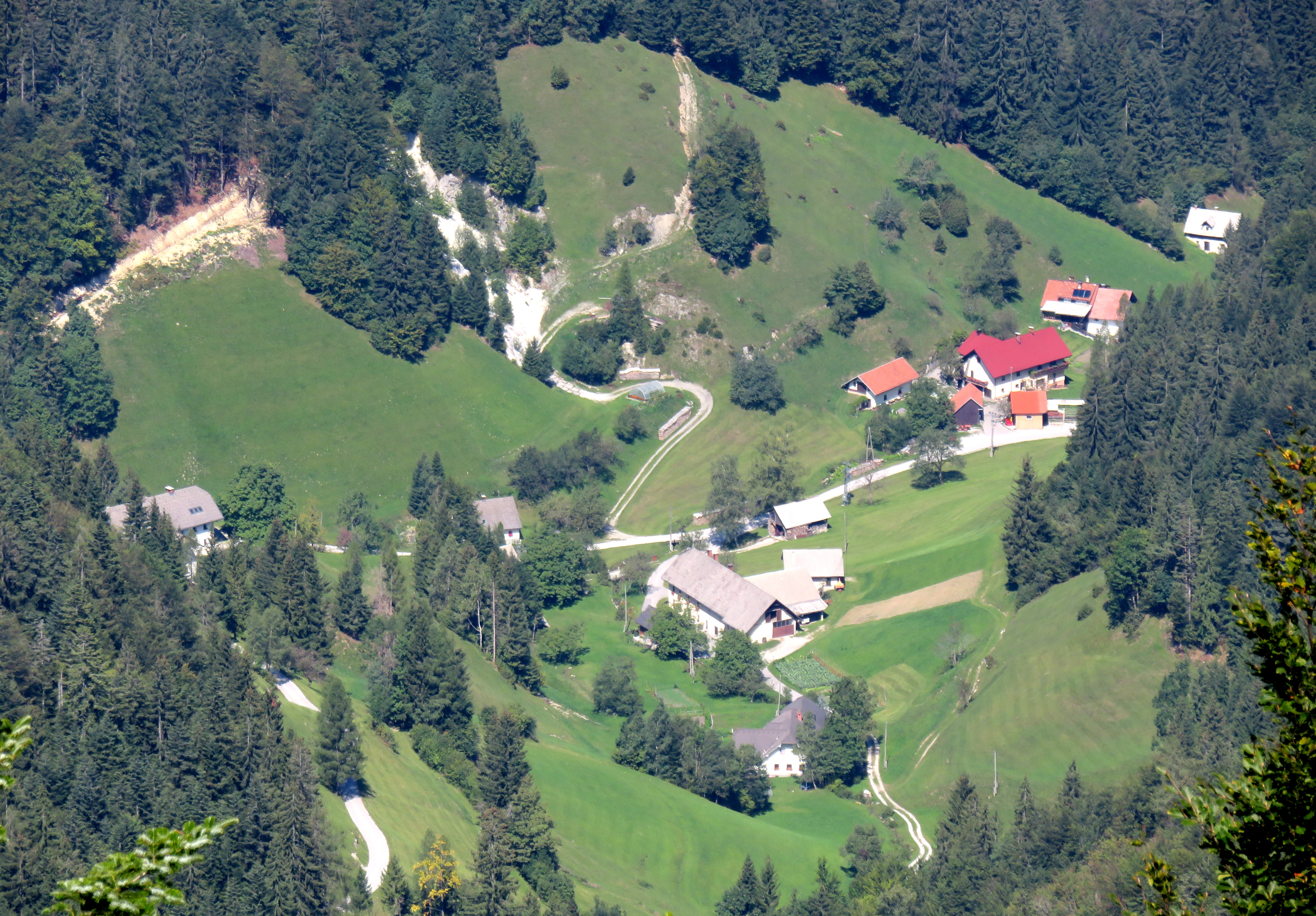

- Location in Slovenia
- Coordinates: 46°10′59.22″N 14°6′17.67″E
- Country: Slovenia
- Traditional Region: Upper Carniola
- Statistical region: Upper Carniola
- Municipality: Železniki

Area
  - Total: 4.651 km^{2} (1.796 sq mi)
- Elevation: 806.2 m (2,645 ft)

Population (2026)
  - Total: 74
  - Density: 16/km^{2} (41/sq mi)

Potok (pronounced [ˈpɔːtɔk], in older sources Farji Potok or Farjev Potok, German: Pfaffenbach) is a settlement in the Municipality of Železniki in the Upper Carniola region of Slovenia. In January 2026, the population was 74.

== Name ==
The name of the settlement, Potok, literally means 'creek, stream'. The older Slovene name, Farji Potok (literally, 'Parish Creek'), as well as the semantically equivalent German name Pfaffenbach, refers to land in the village that was owned by Saint Anthony's parish church in Železniki. The village lies at confluence of Šturm Creek (Šturmova grapa) with Matevžek Creek (Matevžkova grapa), where they create Parish Creek (Farji potok), a tributary of the Davča River.
