= Slovene declension =

Part of speech in the Slovene language

This page describes the declension of nouns, adjectives and pronouns in Slovene. For information on Slovene grammar in general, see Slovene grammar.

This article follows the tonal orthography. For the conversion into pitch orthography, see Slovene national phonetic transcription.

== Grammatical categories ==
Nouns are declined for six cases and three numbers. Adjectives and most pronouns additionally decline for three genders.

=== Cases ===
There are six cases (the Slovene names are given in brackets):

1. Nominative (imenovalnik or nominativ)
2. Genitive (rodilnik or genitiv)
3. Dative (dajalnik or dativ)
4. Accusative (tožilnik or akuzativ)
5. Locative (mestnik or lokativ)
6. Instrumental (orodnik or instrumental)

Traditionally, the cases are given in the order above. They are also usually numbered accordingly: the nominative case is the first case, the genitive the second, and so on.

The nouns are usually listed and sorted by their nominative singular form, but declension is defined by the genitive singular form. For this reason, genitive singular form is commonly written with the nominative. Where it is not otherwise noted, the second form is in genitive singular form.

==== Vocative ====
Vocative (zvalnik or vokativ) was used with the original endings in Slovene up to the 18th century by, for example Janez Svetokriški, but has now been replaced with the endings of the nominative case. Some words, however, kept the vocative form, such as oče (instead of the nominative *otь̀cь) 'father'. Colloquially, vocative endings are still present, but the current use is taken from Croatian.

While having the same endings, it is still tonemically different from the nominative case, always having circumflex accent, but because of its similarity with nominative, it is often omitted from declension tables or is considered a special case of nominative, called 'addressive nominative' (ogovorni imenovalnik) in Slovene literature.

=== Numbers ===
Slovene has three numbers:

1. Singular (ednina), which refers to one object.
2. Dual (dvojina), which refers to a pair of objects.
3. Plural (množina), which refers to more than two objects.

There is, however, an exception to that rule. Plural is used instead of dual for nouns that represent things that usually come in pairs (such as body parts, socks, twins, and parents), except if one wants to stress that the noun relates to both parts and after words that signify a pair (such as oba 'both', etc. ):

- Starše sem vprašal, če lahko grem ven. (I asked parents if I can go out.) – plural is used.
- Na vpisnico se morata podpisati oba starša. (Both parents have to sign the application.) – dual is used.

=== Genders ===
A noun in Slovene can have one of the following three genders:

1. Masculine (moški, abbreviated m. sp.); divided further into animate (accusative singular equals genitive) and inanimate (accusative singular equals nominative) in the first and fourth masculine declension, and in first adjective declension.
2. Feminine (ženski, abbreviated ž. sp.)
3. Neuter (srednji, abbreviated sr. sp.); which is in some dialects masculinized or feminized.

Native speakers usually identify a gender by placing a demonstrative pronoun tisti 'that' in front of it. Since some nouns can only have a singular form and some only a plural form (extremely rarely also only dual, such as ribi 'pisces'), both singular and plural endings must be remembered. Note that the feminine singular and neuter plural endings are the same so the number must be determined first.

Non-native speakers in most cases determine try to determine gender from the ending of a noun in nominative singular.

- Masculine nouns typically end in a consonant, although a few end in a vowel, mostly in -a, -o and -i (some names, letters, nominalized adjectives etc.).
- Feminine nouns usually end in -a; these are the "a-stem" nouns. A number of feminine nouns end in a consonant; these are mostly "i-stem" and "v-stem" nouns.
- The vast majority of neuter nouns end in -o or -e, but second and third neuter declension end with a variety of sounds since they have a null ending in nominative case.

=== Declensions ===
Declensions are divided differently in international and Slovene literature. In Slovene literature, the declensions are defined by the ending in genitive singular, but in international literature, the nouns are often divided by the stem (the same way as in Proto-Slavic), which are more numerous. Thus, they can be considered as a subdivision of the declension. The stem declensions that are a subdivision of the main declension are a result of a stem lengthening alteration (premena), or is a subpattern (podvzorec).

There are four different noun declension for every gender in Slovene and two for the adjectives. Besides the name, the identifying ending (ending in genitive singular) is written:

Masculine:

- First masculine declension; ending -a, -u, or -e (word dȃn)
  - Masculine o-/e-stem declension
  - Masculine t-stem declension
  - Masculine n-stem declension
  - Masculine j-stem declension
- Second masculine declension (masculine a-stem declension); ending -e (except dȃn)
- Third masculine declension (masculine declension without endings); ending -ø
- Fourth masculine declension (masculine i-/e-stem declension); ending -ega

Feminine:

- First feminine declension; ending -e, genitive plural ending is not -ih
  - Feminine a-stem declension
  - Feminine r-stem declension
  - Feminine v-stem declension
  - Feminine n-stem declension
- Second feminine declension (feminine i-stem declension); ending -i
- Third feminine declension (feminine declensions without endings); ending -ø
- Fourth feminine declension (feminine i-/e-stem declension); ending -e, genitive plural ending -ih

Neuter:

- First neuter declension; ending -a
  - Neuter o-/e-stem declension
  - Neuter n-stem declension
  - Neuter s-stem declension
  - Neuter t-stem declension
- Second neuter declension (neuter a-stem declension); ending -e
- Third neuter declension (neuter declension without endings); ending -ø
- Fourth neuter declension (neuter i-/e-stem declension); ending -ega

Adjective:

- First adjective declension (adjective declension with endings); ending -ega
- Second adjective declension (adjective declension without endings); ending -ø

=== Accentual types ===
There are four different accentual types:

- Fixed (nepremični), where the stress is always on the same stem syllable.
- Mobile (premični), where the stress is on different stem syllables.
- Ending (končniški), where the stress is always on the ending.
- Mixed (mešani), where the stress is sometimes on the stem and sometimes on the ending.

In first masculine, second feminine and first adjectival declension, accentual types affect the endings in some cases.

Some words can also change accent from fixed to mixed in one number or in only one case. These nouns follow accent changes of the fixed type, except where they change to mixed type (they follow mixed accentuation). Some nouns can also change the accentuation after certain prepositions. These forms are always circumflex (for example, primẹ̑r, accusative singular primẹ̑r, but after na, it changes into na prȋmer).

=== Degrees of comparison ===
There is a three-stage and two-stage comparison in Slovene.

The three-stage comparison has the following degrees:

1. Positive (osnovnik or pozitiv)
2. Comparative (primernik or komparativ)
3. Superlative (presežnik or superlativ)

The two-stage declension has the following degrees:

1. Positive (osnovnik or pozitiv)
2. Elative (pridvignjena stopnja or elativ)

=== Animacy ===
Masculine nouns and adjectives are divided between animate and inanimate nouns.

Animate nouns are nouns that represent a living or mythological being (Francọ̑z 'Frenchman', rȁk 'crab', dȗh 'ghost') and words that originally had that meaning, but have a different one now (vipȃvec (a type of wine), francọ̑z 'monkey wrench', Oriọ̑n 'Orion'). In this category are also card names and suits, and some names of cars and mushrooms, such as as 'ace', pȋk 'club', gọ̑lf (Golf, a Volkswagen car), and gobȃn 'bolete'. The word duh is animate when it means 'ghost' or 'mentality'. Some diminutives are animate, even if they represent an inanimate object (for example, stolček 'little chair' ). Names of space objects that are named after gods are either animate or inanimate (e. g. Merkur 'Mercury')

This distinction is also applied to all words that modify the noun, such as adjectives, determiners and the like. Thus, adjectives in the masculine accusative singular will have either the form of the nominative (no ending or -i), or the form of the genitive (-ega).

== Nouns, nominal pronouns, nominalized adjectives ==
The declensions for nouns, nominal pronouns, and nominalized adjectives can be split by gender, as gender and declension pattern coincide. The dual and plural are not distinguished in the genitive and locative cases of nouns; the plural form is used for the dual as well. For neuter nouns, the nominative and accusative forms are always the same, in all numbers.

Nominal and nominalized pronouns also follow this inflection patterns, however most of them are irregular. For irregularities among pronouns, see the pronouns section.

=== First Masculine declension ===
First masculine declension follow nouns whose genitive singular ending is -a (korȃk korȃka), -u (mọ̑st mostȗ), and the noun dan (dȃn dnẹ̑). The vast majority of masculine nouns are declined following this inflection pattern. It is so common that masculine nouns following the second (and some following the third and the fourth) can be declined following the pattern of the first.

Masculine nouns are further divided between animate and inanimate nouns. This difference is only significant for the accusative singular.

- For inanimate nouns, the accusative singular is identical to the nominative singular. For example, stȍl 'chair', genitive singular stóla, accusative singular stȍl.
- For animate nouns, the accusative singular is identical to the genitive singular. For example, fȁnt 'boy', genitive singular fánta, accusative singular fánta.

==== Masculine o-/e-stem declension ====
The standard declension of first masculine declension is the o-stem declension. O-stem nouns are divided between "hard" and "soft" stems, see the main Slovene grammar article for the meaning of these terms.

First masculine declension endings
	Hard declension			Soft declension		
	Singular	Dual	Plural	Singular	Dual	Plural
Nominative	-	-a	-i	-	-a	-i
Genitive	-a	-ov	-ov	-a	-ev	-ev
Dative	-u / -i (styl.)	-oma	-om	-u / -i (styl.)	-ema	-em
Accusative	nom or gen	-a	-e	nom or gen	-a	-e
Locative	-u / -i (styl.)	-ih	-ih	-u / -i (styl.)	-ih	-ih
Instrumental	-om	-oma	-i	-em	-ema	-i
Vocative	-	-a	-i	-	-a	-i
styl. – the form is stylistically marked

==== Masculine t-stem declension ====
Proper names ending in -e normally follow this declension like the noun otročȅ 'kid', adding the infix -t- before the endings. For example, Zvọ̑ne Zvọ̑neta (a male name). This declension also follow some other nouns ending in -e if it represents hypocoristicity (fantȅ fantẹ́ta 'boy, immature man'). The noun oče 'father' also follows this declension.

Some historic Greek names, such as Ksenofọ̑n 'Xenophon' and Ȃjas 'Ajax the Great', also follow this inflection pattern, however, it is also common to already have a t-stem in nominative singular (Ksenofọ̑n/Ksenofọ̑nt Ksenofọ̑nta, Ȃjas/Ajant Ajanta).

In speech or in writing of lower register, nouns that have the ending -o in nominative singular, such as Márko (a male name) and sȋnko 'little son' also follow this inflection pattern (Márko Márkota, sȋnko sȋnkota). In dialectal speeches this also happens to proper nouns ending in -a, such as Míha and Lúka, and the a is in some dialects changed to e (Míha Míhata/Míheta, Lúka Lúkata/Lúketa), although in some dialects these words can be lengthened with another consonant, for example, with n in Carinthian dialects (Márko Márkona, Lúka Lukana).

==== Masculine n-stem declension ====
A few nouns ending in -elj have a stem ending in -eljn- rather than dropping the fill vowel. For example, nágelj nágeljna 'carnation' and Fráncelj Fránceljna (a male name). These nouns can be also declined normally (nágelj náglja, Fráncelj Fránclja), however, that is less common.

Some Latin names ending in -o can also follow this inflection pattern, such as Kȃto Katọ̑na 'Cato', but the n can be already added in nominative singular (Kȃton Katọ̑na).

==== Masculine j-stem declension ====
Nouns with a stem whose pronunciation ends in /-ɾ/ or a vowel (not to be confused with a noun having a vowel ending in nominative singular) have an added -j- when an ending is attached, such as tȃksi tȃksija 'taxi' and redár redárja 'security guard at a public event'.

There are exceptions, though. Monosyllabic words follow the o-stem declension (mȋr mirȗ 'peace'), except cār cārja 'tsar', and similarly also stȃr (old way of measuring cereal), júr 'bolete, 1000 units of currency', and fȃr 'priest'. Nouns derived from verbs, such as gȏvor 'speech', vȋr 'source', and prodȍr 'penetration' also follow o-stem declension. The same is true for nouns that have a fill vowel followed by /ɾ/, such as vẹ̑ter vẹ̑tra 'wind' and blȃgor blȃgra 'well-being'. Compound nouns that contain a non-j-stem noun (such as dvogȏvor dvogȏvora 'dialogue' and pȍdodbȍr pȍdodbóra 'subcommittee') are also excluded, except for names that end in -mir, such as Vlȃdimir (a male name) and Čȓtomir, which can be declined either way (Vlȃdimir Vlȃdimira/Vlȃdimirja, Čȓtomir Čȓtomira/Čȓtomirja). Some nouns that end in -r and silent -e can also be declined either way (Tesnière Slovene pronunciation: [tɛnˈjɛ́ːɾ] 'Tesnière' Tesnièra Slovene pronunciation: [tɛnˈjɛ́ːra]/Tesnièrja [tɛnˈjɛ́ːrja], Shakespeare Slovene pronunciation: [ˈʃéːkspiɾ] Shakespeara Slovene pronunciation: [ˈʃéːkspira]/Shakespearja [ˈʃéːkspirja]) 'Shakespeare. Some nouns, such as Madžȃr 'Hungar', sẹ́ver 'north', and Alžir 'Algiers', also follow the o-stem declension. Note that in loanwords, the vowel can be written differently than expected, such as Disney [ˈdíːzni] Disneyja [ˈdíːznija]'Disney' (but Broadway Slovene pronunciation: [ˈbróːdvɛj] Broadwaya [ˈbróːdveja] 'Broadway'). Note that Latin and Greek words can have an ending that ends with a consonant in nominative singular, but they are still j-stem nouns (Ovidius Ovidija 'Ovid').

Nouns ending in non-silent -r or a vowel plus a silent consonant also follow this declension, but the /j/ is only pronounced and not written: (Dumas [diˈmáː] Dumasa [diˈmáːja]) 'Dumas'.

==== Alternations and other exceptions of the first masculine declension ====
First masculine declension has many alternations:

- A relatively small number of masculine nouns have a nominative (and accusative, if inanimate) singular an ending -a (slúga (mostly the nouns that can also follow second masculine declination) 'servant'), -e (finȃle 'final'), -o (Márko (a male name), or -u (Enẹ̑scu 'Enescu'). Sometimes, but not always, the suffixes in Latin loanwords -as, -es, -is, -os, -us, and -um are considered an ending. Examples of this include Leonȋdas Leonȋda 'Leonidas', Ȃvgijas Ȃvgija 'Augeas', Aristọ̄teles Aristọ̄tela 'Aristotle', Juvenȃlis Juvenȃla 'Juvenal', Arhȋlos Arhȋloha 'Archilochus', Tȃcitus Tȃcita 'Tacitus, and Tarẹ̑ntum Tarẹ̑nta 'Taranto'. These suffixes can be omitted (Leonȋd, Aristọ̄tel, Juvenȃl etc.), but if we do so, the stems that end with a vowel must be lengthened with a j, even in nominative case (Ȃvgij 'Augeas', Menelȃj 'Menelaus', Lívij 'Livius', etc.). The lengthening of the stem is also present in other cases if one does not decide to omit the suffix. Other times, the suffix is considered as a part of the stem, such as Rọ̑dos Rọ̑dosa 'Rhodes', and some can be declined both ways, such as ọ̑bolos ọ̑bola/ọ̑bolosa 'Obol' and alpinẹ̑tum alpinẹ̑ta/alpinẹ̑tuma 'Alpine botanical garden'. Modern Greek names are considered not to have an ending in nominative (Makȃrios Makariosa 'Macarios').
- The surname Nepos can have alternatively a stem Nepot- in other cases (Nẹ̑pos Nẹ̑pota).
- some monosyllabic nouns have an -u ending in genitive singular (mọ̑st mostȗ 'bridge', rọ̑d rodȗ 'lineage').
- Many nouns have the stem shortened in cases where the ending is not a null ending (as it is nominative singular), mainly because they have a fill vowel, which is there to ease the pronunciation. The change can be evident in writing, pronunciation, or both:
  - In writing, -e at the end of the stem is omitted in some loanwords Wilde Slovene pronunciation: [ˈʋáːjlt] Wilda Slovene pronunciation: [ˈʋáːjlda] 'Wilde' and Laforgue Slovene pronunciation: [laˈfóːrg] Lafforgua [laˈfóːrga] 'Laforgue', but not in cases where that would affect the pronunciation of preceding letters, such as in Wallace [ˈwáːləs]/[ˈváːlis] Wallacea [ʋálisa] 'Wallace' and George [ˈdʒóːɾdʒ] Georgea [ˈdʒóːɾdʒa] 'George', except if it is preventing the nasalisation of the consonant + m/n that precede it, such as Lamartine [lamaɾˈtíːn] Lamartina [lamaɾˈtíːna] 'Lamartine'. If e is followed by other letters, it is kept in all cases, whether it is pronounced or not (Holmes [xóːlms] Holmesa [xóːlmsa] 'Holmes' and Jacques [ʒáːk] Jacquesa [ʒáːka] 'Jacques').
  - In pronunciation, when the sound is not written with an e or o, such as in žánr žánra and fílm fílma.
  - In both when the sound is written by its own letter, usually with an e, but also with a or o, such as pósəł pósla 'business' and sejəm sejma 'fair'. In loanwords from other Slavic languages, fill vowels are preserved if the removal would break other grammatical rules. Examples include Muromec Muromca 'Muromets', Dudok Dudka 'Dudok', Čapek Čapka 'Čapek', Kragujevac Kragujevca 'Kragujevac', and Zadar Zadra 'Zadar', but not Lev 'Leo', because Lev Lva would violate other grammatical rules, so it is declined as Lev Leva. The omission of the sound is also present in some non-Slavic loanwords, such as München [ˈmýːnxən]/[ˈmíːŋxən] Münchna [ˈmíːŋxna] 'Munich', ráster rástra 'raster', but sometimes the sound is preserved in all cases, where it is transformed into /e/ or /o/, such as Ȃndersen Ȃndersena 'Andersen' and Olafsson [ˈóːlafsɔn] Olafssona [ˈóːlafsɔna] 'Ólafsson'.
- In the 19th century the ending -i was often used in the dative/locative singular instead of -u. For example, nominative óče 'father', dative/locative očẹ́ti. Nowadays this ending is considered archaic or dialectal.
- Nouns ending in -io (such as radio [ˈɾáːdijɔ]/[ˈɾàːdijɔ] 'radio') usually follow the soft inflection pattern radio instrumental singular radiem.
- Names ending in a vowel and consonant that is not pronounced are j-stem nouns, and can be written following hard or soft declension, but always pronounced as in soft declension. The added -j- is not written, only pronounced (Marat [maˈɾáː] instrumental singular Maratem/Maratom [maˈɾáːjɛm] 'Marat'). Same happens to those ending in r and a silent consonant (Macquart [makˈáːɾ] instrumental singular Macquartem/Macquartom [makˈáːɾjɛm] 'Macquart').
- Some nouns have the stem lengthened with -ov- in dual and plural, except in genitive case (for example grȃd nominative dual gradȏva 'castle', grȍb nominative dual grobȏva "grave"). These are usually monosyllabic nouns.
- Some nouns have the ending -je in the nominative plural instead of -i. This is a remnant of the Common Slavic masculine i-stem inflection, which was mostly lost in Slovene except for this ending. For example: študȅnt 'student', nominative plural študéntje, gospọ̑d 'sir, lord', nominative plural gospọ̑dje, kmȅt 'farmer', nominative plural kmẹ́tje, etc. Usually, the regular form is also allowed, but rarely preferred.
- Some nouns (mostly those that have an ending -u in genitive singular) have a null ending in genitive dual/plural (lȃs, genitive plural lás 'hair', zọ̑b genitive plural zọ́b 'tooth'). Some can be declined either way (vọ̑z, genitive plural vozóv/vọ̑z).
- About special stressed endings in plural, see mixed accent nouns.
- Few nouns show the effects of the Slavic second palatalisation in some of the plural forms:
  - otrȍk: nominative plural otróci, locative dual/plural otrọ̄cih 'child'.
  - vȏlk: nominative plural volcjẹ̑ 'wolf'. But this form is rare, the usual nominative plural is volkȏvi.
- Many forms of the noun dȃn 'day' have two stems, a shorter one with only the consonants dn-, and a longer one dnẹ̑v-. The longer stem declines as a regular o-stem, while the shorter one has a unique set of endings not shared with any other noun. The formal, most appropriate declension, is a mix of both (the forms in brackets are colloquial):

	Singular	Dual	Plural
Nominative	dȃn	dnẹ̑va, dnȋ	dnẹ̑vi
Genitive	dnẹ̑va, dnẹ̑	(dnẹ̑vov), dní	(dnẹ̑vov), dní
Dative	dnẹ̑vu, dnẹ̑vu (styl.)	(dnẹ̑voma), dnẹ̑ma	(dnẹ̑vom), dnẹ̑m
Accusative	dȃn	dnẹ̑va, dnȋ	dnẹ̑ve, dnȋ
Locative	dnẹ̑vu, dnẹ̑vu (styl.)	(dnẹ̑vih), dnẹ́h	(dnẹ̑vih), dnẹ́h
Instrumental	dnẹ̑vom, dnẹ̑m	(dnẹ̑voma), dnẹ̑ma	dnẹ̑vi, (dnẹ̑mi)
Vocative	dȃn	dnẹ̑va, dnȋ	dnẹ̑vi
styl. – the form is stylistically marked

- The masculine noun člóvek 'human, person' is suppletive. In the plural, the stem ljud- is used, which follows the mobile-accent o-stem declension:

	Singular	Dual	Plural
Nominative	člóvek	človẹ́ka	ljudjẹ̑
Genitive	človẹ́ka	ljudí	ljudí
Dative	človẹ́ku / človẹ́ki (styl.)	človẹ́koma	ljudẹ̑m
Accusative	človẹ́ka	človẹ́ka	ljudȋ
Locative	človẹ́ku / človẹ́ki (styl.)	ljudẹ́h	ljudẹ́h
Instrumental	človẹ́kom	človẹ́koma	ljudmí
Vocative	člȏvek	človẹ̑ka	ljudjẹ̑

==== Fixed accent nouns ====
Circumflex nouns have circumflex accent in all cases, however, the acute accent changes considerably.

- Nouns that have circumflex accent in nominative and genitive singular have long circumflex accent in all cases, except the nouns where the stressed vowel changes (e. g. okȍv, dȏm); these follow mixed accent changes. Nouns that can also have mixed accent also follow the same rules, except if they have a null ending in genitive dual/plural; then they have all plural forms except vocative acute, but change to circumflex if used as an adverb and preceded by a preposition: lȃs 'hair', nominative plural lási, genitive plural lás, locative plural lásih.

	Long → long			Short → long			Can also have mixed accent, genitive plural -ø		
	Singular	Dual	Plural	Singular	Dual	Plural	Singular	Dual	Plural
Nominative	korȃk	korȃka	korȃki	blagoslȍv	blagoslȏva	blagoslȏvi	lȃs	lȃsa	lási
Genitive	korȃka	korȃkov	korȃkov	blagoslȏva	blagoslȏvov	blagoslȏvov	lȃsa	lás	lás
Dative	korȃku / korȃki (styl.)	korȃkoma	korȃkom	blagoslȏvu / blagoslȏvi (styl.)	blagoslȏvoma	blagoslȏvom	lȃsu / lȃsi (styl.)	lȃsoma	lásom
Accusative	korȃk	korȃka	korȃke	blagoslȍv	blagoslȏva	blagoslȏve	lȃs	lȃsa	láse
Locative	korȃku / korȃki (styl.)	korȃkih	korȃkih	blagoslȏvu / blagoslȏvi (styl.)	blagoslȏvih	blagoslȏvih	lȃsu / lȃsi (styl.)	lásih	lásih
Instrumental	korȃkom	korȃkoma	korȃki	blagoslȏvom	blagoslȏvoma	blagoslȏvi	lȃsom	lȃsoma	lási
Vocative	korȃk	korȃka	korȃki	blagoslȍv	blagoslȏva	blagoslȏvi	lȃs	lȃsa	lȃsi

- Nouns that have long acute accent in nominative and genitive singular have circumflex accent in vocative and allow both in genitive, locative and instrumental plural, and locative dual. In collocations which are used as an adverb, and where the word lost the original meaning, the noun is only allowed to have circumflex accent in accusative and locative plural (e. g. v hrȋbe / v hrȋbih 'on a mountain (lit. in mountains)'):

	Singular	Dual	Plural
Nominative	kováč	kováča	kováči
Genitive	kováča	kovāčev	kovāčev
Dative	kováču / kováči (styl.)	kováčema	kováčem
Accusative	kováča	kováča	kováče
Locative	kováču / kováči (styl.)	kovāčih	kovāčih
Instrumental	kováčem	kováčema	kovāči
Vocative	kovȃč	kovȃča	kovȃči
styl. – the form is stylistically marked

- Nouns that have short acute accent in nominative and genitive singular follow the same rules as long acute accented words, but all accents are short:

	Singular	Dual	Plural
Nominative	stə̀bər	stə̀bra	stə̀bri
Genitive	stə̀bra	stə̄brov	stə̄brov
Dative	stə̀bru / stə̀bri (styl.)	stə̀broma	stə̀brom
Accusative	stə̀ber	stə̀bra	stə̀bre
Locative	stə̀bru / stə̀bri (styl.)	stə̄brih	stə̄brih
Instrumental	stə̀brom	stə̀broma	stə̄bri
Vocative	stə̏ber	stə̏bra	stə̏bri
styl. – the form is stylistically marked

- Nouns that have circumflex accent in nominative singular and acute in genitive singular allow both forms in locative and dative singular when preceded by a preposition. The only exception are words in which open-mid vowel changes into a close-mid vowel. In these cases, it further depends which ending does it have in genitive plural. In collocations which are used as an adverb, and where the word lost the original meaning, the noun is only allowed to have circumflex accent in accusative and locative plural. (Note that due to simplicity, only the forms that are affected by this rule are shown; for example, kȍnj can also be declined without the change into close-mid vowel.)

	Short → long			Short → short			Open-mid → close-mid					
	Short → long			Short → short			Genitive plural ending -ø			Genitive plural ending -ov		
	Singular	Dual	Plural	Singular	Dual	Plural	Singular	Dual	Plural	Singular	Dual	Plural
Nominative	fantȅ	fantẹ́ta	fantẹ́ti	pȓst	pŕsta	pŕsti	kȍnj	kónja	kónji	stȍl	stóla	stóli
Genitive	fantẹ́ta	fantẹ̄tov	fantẹ̄tov	pŕsta	pr̄stov	pr̄stov	kónja	kọ́nj	kọ́nj	stóla	arch. stọ́lov	arch. stọ́lov
Dative	fantẹ́tu / fantẹ̄tu (with prep.)	fantẹ́toma	fantẹ́tom	pŕstu / pr̄stu	pŕstoma	pŕstom	kọ́nju / kọ̑nju (with prep.)	kónjema	kónjem	arch. stọ́lu / stọ̑lu (with prep.)	stóloma	stólom
Accusative	fantẹ́ta	fantẹ́ta	fantẹ́te	pȓst	pŕsta	pŕste	kónja	kónja	kónje	stóla	stóla	stóle
Locative	fantẹ̄tu	fantẹ̄tih	fantẹ̄tih	pr̄stu	pr̄stih	pr̄stih	kọ̑nju	kọ̄njih	kọ̄njih	stọ̑lu	stọ̑lih	stọ̑lih
Instrumental	fantẹ́tom	fantẹ́toma	fantẹ̄ti	pŕstom	pŕstoma	pr̄sti	kónjem	kónjema	arch. kọ́nji	stólu	stóloma	arch. stọ́li
Vocative	fantȅ	fantẹ̑ta	fantẹ̑ti	pȓst	pȓsta	pȓsti	kȍnj	kȏnja	kȏnji	stȍl	stȏla	stȏli

==== Mobile accent nouns ====
Mobile accent nouns transfer the stress to the following syllable in all cases but nominative, vocative, and accusative (if the same as nominative) singular.

- Nouns that have circumflex accent in genitive singular, although rare, have circumflex accent in all forms:

	Singular	Dual	Plural
Nominative	dȗal	duȃla	duȃli
Genitive	duȃla	duȃlov	duȃlov
Dative	duȃlu / duȃli (styl.)	duȃloma	duȃlom
Accusative	dȗal	duȃla	duȃle
Locative	duȃlu / duȃli (styl.)	duȃlih	duȃlih
Instrumental	duȃlom	duȃloma	duȃli
Vocative	dȗal	duȃla	duȃli
styl. – the form is stylistically marked

- Nouns that have acute accent in genitive singular change the accent the same way as fixed accent nouns with circumflex in nominative singular and acute in genitive singular when the stress is on the latter syllable and have acute accent when the stress in on the original syllable:

	Singular	Dual	Plural
Nominative	rázred	razrẹ́da	razrẹ́di
Genitive	razrẹ́da	razrẹ̄dov	razrẹ̄dov
Dative	razrẹ́du / razrẹ̄du (with prep.)	razrẹ́doma	razrẹ́dom
Accusative	rázred	razrẹ́da	razrẹ́de
Locative	razrẹ̄du	razrẹ̄dih	razrẹ̄dih
Instrumental	razrẹ́dom	razrẹ́doma	razrẹ̄di
Vocative	rȃzred	razrẹ̑da	razrẹ̑di
note: dative and locative can also have a stylistically marked ending -i.

==== Ending accent nouns ====
Short ending vowels are always circumflex while long ending ones follow the same pattern as mixed accent nouns that have circumflex accent in nominative singular and when the accent is on the stem, the accent is long and acute. There is a slight difference between soft and hard stems in genitive dual/plural, because soft declension only allows short circumflex accent whereas hard declension allows long acute and short circumflex.

	Hard			Soft
	Singular	Dual	Plural	Plural
Nominative	pə̏s	psȁ	psȉ	dobrcȉ
Genitive	psȁ	psȍv / psóv	psȍv / psóv	dobrcȅv
Dative	psȕ / psȉ (styl.)	psóma / psomȁ (styl.)	psȍm	dobrcȅm
Accusative	psȁ	psȁ	psȅ	dobrcȅ
Locative	psȕ / psȉ (styl.)	psȉh	psȉh	dobrcȉh
Instrumental	psȍm	psóma / psomȁ (styl.)	psȉ	dobrcȉ
Vocative	pȅs	psȁ	psȉ	dobrcȉ
styl. – the form is stylistically marked

==== Mixed accent nouns ====
For the mixed accent nouns with long accent, many different factors determine the accent. The accent is usually circumflex, except in these cases:

- Genitive dual/plural, locative dual/plural and instrumental is acute if the accent is on the last syllable: člóvek 'human', genitive plural ljudí, dȃr 'gift', genitive plural daróv, lȃs 'hair', genitive plural lás (but grȃd 'castle', locative plural gradȏvih). This happens in genitive case in all words, no matter the ending, and in words that do not have -ov lengthening in locative and instrumental. Those without the infix do not have an ending in genitive plural, dative plural ending is -ẹ̑m instead of -om / -em, accusative plural is still -ẹ̑, locative dual/plural ending -ẹ́h instead of -ih, instrumental plural -mí instead of -i, and dative and instrumental dual ending is -ẹ̑ma instead of -oma / -ema. This rule does not necessarily apply to irregular nouns.
- Stressed vowel in nominative plural ending -je is close-mid (-jẹ̑): lȃs 'hair', nominative plural lasjẹ̑, mȏž 'man', nominative plural možjẹ̑.
- Dative and locative singular is acute if the stressed vowel is open-mid (e or o): gnȏj 'manure' gnóju.
- When used as an adverb, uncountable nouns or nouns that have ending -ẹ́h in locative dual/plural (those that do not lengthen the stem) allow both accents in locative singular. Words that can also have a form with open-mid vowel in locative singular.
- Nouns that allow both the stem or the ending to be accented usually have the stem accented when preceded by a preposition and have the ending accented when they are not.
- Dative and instrumental dual can have the accent either on the ending or the stem. If the accent is on the stem, it is long.
- Nouns that switch accent only in plural on in only one case follow fixed accent changes when the accent does not shift.
- Nouns can also colloquially have fixed accent. See fixed accent for that.

Here are declensions for some mixed accent nouns, but keep in mind that they have several different changes and only relevant forms are written:

	Stem lengthening with -ov			Nominative plural -jẹ̑, genitive plural -ø			Open-mid vowel in locative singular, uncountable
	Singular	Dual	Plural	Singular	Dual	Plural	Singular
Nominative	grȃd	gradȏva	gradȏvi	mọ̑ž	možȃ	možjẹ̑	gnọ̑j
Genitive	gradȗ*	gradóv	gradóv	možȃ	mọ́ž	mọ́ž	gnojȃ
Dative	grȃdu	gradȏvoma	gradȏvom	mọ̑žu	možẹ̑ma / možȏma	možẹ̑m	gnọ̑ju / gnóju**
Accusative	grȃd	gradȏva	gradȏve	možȃ	možȃ	možẹ̑	gnọ̑j
Locative	grȃdu	gradȏvih	gradȏvih	mọ̑žu	možẹ́h	možẹ́h	gnọ̑ju / gnóju
Instrumental	grȃdom	gradȏvoma	gradȏvi	mọ̑žem	možẹ̑ma / možȏma	možmí	gnọ̑jem
Vocative	grȃd	gradȏva	gradȏvi	mọ̑ž	možȃ	možjẹ̑	gnọ̑j
	Irregular			Irregular			
	Singular	Dual	Plural	Singular	Dual	Plural	
Nominative	lȃs	lȃsa	lasjẹ̑	brẹ̑g	brẹ̑ga	brẹ̑gi / bregȏvi	
Genitive	lasȗ	lás	lás	brẹ̑ga	brẹ̑gov	brẹ̑gov	
Dative	lȃsu	lȃsoma	lasẹ̑m	brẹ̑gu	brẹ̑goma	brẹ̑gom / bregȏvom	
Accusative	lȃs	lȃsa	lasẹ̑	brẹ̑g	brẹ̑ga	brẹ̑ge / brẹ̑gove	
Locative	lȃsu	lasẹ́h	lasẹ́h	brẹ̑gu / brẹ̄gu (used as an adverb)	brẹ̑gih / bregȏvih / bregẹ́h	brẹ̑gih / bregȏvih / bregẹ́h	
Instrumental	lȃsom	lȃsoma	lasmí	brẹ̑gom	brẹ̑goma	brẹ̑gi / bregȏvi	
Vocative	lȃs	lȃsa	lasjẹ̑	brẹ̑g	brẹ̑ga	brẹ̑gi / bregȏvi	
*Genitive singular ending -u does not affect the accent or other endings. **The form is given as an example in Slovenski pravopis, the book by which Slovene is regulated, however in the same book, it is not listed as an appropriate form of the word.

Mixed accent nouns with short accent follow the same pattern as ending accent nouns (including the difference bətween soft and hard stems), except in nominative and vocative (and accusative if the same as nominative) singular, and dative and instrumental dual, where the accent is on the stem and acute if long:

	Singular	Dual	Plural
Nominative	bə̏t	bətȁ	bətȉ
Genitive	bətȁ	bətȍv / bətóv	bətȍv / bətóv
Dative	bətȕ / bətȉ (styl.)	bȅtoma	bətȍm
Accusative	bə̏t	bətȁ	bətȅ
Locative	bətȕ / bətȉ (styl.)	bətȉh	bətȉh
Instrumental	bətȍm	bȅtoma	bətȉ
Vocative	bȅt	bətȁ	bətȉ
styl. – the form is stylistically marked

=== Second masculine declension (masculine a-stem declension) ===
Second masculine declension follow nouns whose genitive singular ending is -e (slúga slúge), except the noun dan (dȃn dnẹ̑).

Second masculine declension has the same endings as first feminine declension, however, not all alterations apply here. Animate and inanimate nouns are not declined differently, but the words that modify the noun still have those distinctions.

All nouns following the second masculine declension can also follow first masculine declension, but keeping the ending in nominative singular. They can also be feminized in dual and plural, following first feminine declension (essentially, the endings do not change).

Second masculine declension endings
	Singular	Dual	Plural
Nominative	-a	-i	-e
Genitive	-e	-	-
Dative	-i	-ama	-am
Accusative	-o	-i	-e
Locative	-i	-ah	-ah
Instrumental	-o	-ama	-ami
Vocative	-a	-i	-e

==== Alternations and other exceptions of the second masculine declension ====
- In nominative singular, some words, such as kamikȃze 'kamikaze', have an -e ending.
- In genitive dual and genitive plural, nouns ending in consonant + j, have an i inserted between, such as delovọ̑dja genitive plural delovọ̑dij.

==== Accent ====
Second masculine declension follow only fixed accent nouns. These can be circumflex or acute.

- Circumflex nouns are always circumflex:

	Singular	Dual	Plural
Nominative	vọ̑jvoda	vọ̑jvodi	vọ̑jvode
Genitive	vọ̑jvode	vọ̑jvod	vọ̑jvod
Dative	vọ̑jvodi	vọ̑jvodama	vọ̑jvodam
Accusative	vọ̑jvodo	vọ̑jvodi	vọ̑jvode
Locative	vọ̑jvodi	vọ̑jvodah	vọ̑jvodah
Instrumental	vọ̑jvodo	vọ̑jvodama	vọ̑jvodami
Vocative	vọ̑jvoda	vọ̑jvodi	vọ̑jvode

- Acute accent changes into circumflex in genitive dual/plural and vocative case and is either acute or circumflex in instrumental singular:

	Singular	Dual	Plural
Nominative	slúga	slúgi	slúge
Genitive	slúge	slȗg	slȗg
Dative	slúgi	slúgama	slúgam
Accusative	slúgo	slúgi	slúge
Locative	slúgi	slúgah	slúgah
Instrumental	slūgo	slúgama	slúgami
Vocative	slȗga	slȗgi	slȗge

=== Third masculine declension (masculine declension without endings) ===
Third masculine declension follow nouns whose genitive singular (or in any other case) ending is a null ending (-). This includes all letters, as well as some other words, such as nebọ́digatrẹ́ba 'menace', jȍj/jọ̑j 'oh', and čačačȃ 'Cha-cha-cha'. There are, however, only a handful of words that feel natural to be declined this way; for many of them, it is preferred to be declined following the first masculine declension. Alternations of the first declension must then be applied, and since all consonant letters are usually pronounced as consonant + ə̏, all letters, except for X [ˈíːks] and Y [ˈíːpsilɔn] must follow the j-stem version of the first declension (K K-ja). Exceptions are F, L, M, N, R, S, and Š, which can also be pronounced [ˈɛ́f], [ˈɛ́l], [ˈɛ́m], [ˈɛ́n], [ˈɛ́ɾ], [ˈɛ́s], and [ˈɛ́ʃ], respectively and can therefore follow the o-stem version (F F-ja/F-a), and the pronunciacion changes accordingly. Although there is a hyphen between the letter and j, keep in mind that j ist still part of the stem, not the ending.

Third masculine declension endings
	Singular	Dual	Plural
Nominative	-	-	-
Genitive	-	-	-
Dative	-	-	-
Accusative	-	-	-
Locative	-	-	-
Instrumental	-	-	-
Vocative	-	-	-

==== Alternations and other exceptions of the third masculine declension ====
- Most of the time, nouns nebọ́digatrẹ́ba 'menace' and nebọ́dijihtrẹ́ba 'menaces' are considered one irregular noun instead of two nouns that only have a singular and a plural form, respectively. In that case, the infix -ga- is changed to -jih- in dual and plural. The infix is actually a personal pronoun ȍn 'he' in genitive case, but the dual form is still nebọ́dijihtrẹ́ba, and not with an infix -ju- as would be expected:

	Singular	Dual	Plural
Nominative	nebọ́digatrẹ́ba	nebọ́dijihtrẹ́ba	nebọ́dijihtrẹ́ba
Genitive	nebọ́digatrẹ́ba	nebọ́dijihtrẹ́ba	nebọ́dijihtrẹ́ba
Dative	nebọ́digatrẹ́ba	nebọ́dijihtrẹ́ba	nebọ́dijihtrẹ́ba
Accusative	nebọ́digatrẹ́ba	nebọ́dijihtrẹ́ba	nebọ́dijihtrẹ́ba
Locative	nebọ́digatrẹ́ba	nebọ́dijihtrẹ́ba	nebọ́dijihtrẹ́ba
Instrumental	nebọ́digatrẹ́ba	nebọ́dijihtrẹ́ba	nebọ́dijihtrẹ́ba
Vocative	nebọ̑digatrẹ̑ba	nebọ̑dijihtrẹ̑ba	nebọ̑dijihtrẹ̑ba

==== Accent ====
Words declined this way always have fixed accent, which is the same throughout, no matter if it is circumflex or acute, long or short. The only exception is vocative, where the accent is circumflex.

	Circumflex			Acute			Short		
	Singular	Dual	Plural	Singular	Dual	Plural	Singular	Dual	Plural
Nominative	kojnẹ̑	kojnẹ̑	kojnẹ̑	cáker	cáker	cáker	kȁnt	kȁnt	kȁnt
Genitive	kojnẹ̑	kojnẹ̑	kojnẹ̑	cáker	cáker	cáker	kȁnt	kȁnt	kȁnt
Dative	kojnẹ̑	kojnẹ̑	kojnẹ̑	cáker	cáker	cáker	kȁnt	kȁnt	kȁnt
Accusative	kojnẹ̑	kojnẹ̑	kojnẹ̑	cáker	cáker	cáker	kȁnt	kȁnt	kȁnt
Locative	kojnẹ̑	kojnẹ̑	kojnẹ̑	cáker	cáker	cáker	kȁnt	kȁnt	kȁnt
Instrumental	kojnẹ̑	kojnẹ̑	kojnẹ̑	cáker	cáker	cáker	kȁnt	kȁnt	kȁnt
Vocative	kojnẹ̑	kojnẹ̑	kojnẹ̑	cȃker	cȃker	cȃker	kȁnt	kȁnt	kȁnt

=== Fourth masculine declension (masculine i-/e-stem declension) ===
Fourth masculine declension follow nouns whose genitive singular ending is -ega. The nouns following this declension were derived from an adjective, and are therefore nominalized adjectives. They are derived from the definite forms of the adjective, hence the ending -i in nominative singular. This declension also differentiates between animate and inanimate nouns in the same way as the first one. The declension is the same as declension for masculine adjectives.

Some masculine nominalized adjectives, mostly proper nouns, are declined using first male declension. In addition, most of them have a null ending - in nominative singular, only rarely do they have an ending -i. Examples include Mẹ̑den Mẹ̑dena 'Meden', Raztrẹ̑sen Raztrẹ̑senega 'Raztresen', tráven trávna 'April, May' etc.

Names in other languages ending in [-ski] (or similarly look like definite adjectives) that are from non-Slavic languages are declined using the first declension (Tedẹ̑schi Tedẹ̑schija 'Tedeschi, McClọ̑sky McClọ̑skyja 'McClosky', Kreisky Kreiskyja/Kreiskega 'Kreisky') and those from Slavic languages are declined using the fourth declension (Vranȋtzky Vranȋtzkega 'Vranitzky', Hradẹ̑tzky Hradẹ̑tzkega 'Hradetzky' etc.

	Singular	Dual	Plural
Nominative	-i	-a	-i
Genitive	-ega	-ih	-ih
Dative	-emu	-ima	-im
Accusative	-ega	-a	-e
Locative	-em	-ih	-ih
Instrumental	-im	ima	-imi
Vocative	-i	-a	-i

==== Alternations and other exceptions of the fourth masculine declension ====
- The -i sound in nominative singular and plural is in some loanwords written with y, but not in other cases (Chomsky, nominative plural Chomsky, instrumental singular Chomskim).
- Vast majority nouns are declined as animate (Nedeljski, accusative singular Nedeljskega 'a Sunday issue of the newspaper Dnevnik').
- Other irregularities that adjectives and adjectival pronouns possess also apply here.
- For the different endings in nominative singular, see first adjective declension.

==== Accent ====
These nouns decline the same way as definite masculine forms of adjectives following the first adjectival declension do. Therefore, only fixed and ending accentual types exist. For accent changes when nominalizing, see § Accent of nominalized adjectives.

=== First feminine declension ===
First feminine declension follow nouns whose genitive singular ending is -e (lípa lípe), except if genitive plural has an ending -ih (dežȗrna genitive plural dežȗrnih), those follow the fourth feminine declension. Those ending in [-əu̯] and nouns máti 'mother' and hčȋ 'daughter' also follow this declension. In plural, genitive case has a null ending (víle vȋl 'pitchfork').

The first feminine declension is the most common pattern for feminine nouns. There is no distinction between hard and soft stems (the declension used in modern Slovene was historically the soft one and the merge happened in Alpine Slavic).

==== Feminine a-stem declension ====
The standard declension of first feminine declension is the a-stem declension.

Feminine a-stem declension endings
	Singular	Dual	Plural
Nominative	-a	-i	-e
Genitive	-e	-	-
Dative	-i	-ama	-am
Accusative	-o	-i	-e
Locative	-i	-ah	-ah
Instrumental	-o	-ama	-ami
Vocative	-a	-i	-e

==== Feminine r-stem declension ====
This declension subtype follow only the nouns máti 'mother' and hči 'daughter'. They have a different stem in nominative singular than in other cases and numbers. (mati matere, hči hčere). There are also minor changes to the endings in singular.

Feminine r-stem declension endings
	Singular	Dual	Plural
Nominative	-i	-i	-e
Genitive	-e	-	-
Dative	-i	-ama	-am
Accusative	-	-i	-e
Locative	-i	-ah	-ah
Instrumental	-jo	-ama	-ami
Vocative	-i	-i	-e

==== Feminine v-stem declension ====
A small number of feminine nouns belongs to the feminine v-stem declension, with the ending -əv (in which the -ə- is a fill vowel). These inflect as r-stems, but with the i-stem instrumental singular ending -ijo and have a null ending in nominative singular. Many nouns in this group can colloquially also inflect as regular a-stems, with the nominative singular ending in -va and accusative and instrumental singular in -vo.

Feminine v-stem declension endings
	Singular	Dual	Plural
Nominative	-	-i	-e
Genitive	-e	-	-
Dative	-i	-ama	-am
Accusative	-	-i	-e
Locative	-i	-ah	-ah
Instrumental	-ijo	-ama	-ami
Vocative	-	-i	-e

==== Feminine n-stem declension ====
Only few nouns have their stems lengthend with -n, except in nominative singular. The most common example is Jȗno (Jȗno Junọ̑ne), which can also be declined following the third feminine declension (Juno Juno 'Juno') or as an a-stem noun (Junọ̑na Junọ̑ne). The endings are the same as for a-stem nouns. N-stem declension did not exist in Proto-Slavic (at least not for feminine nouns) and it evolved later.

==== Alternations and other exceptions of the first feminine declension ====
- Some nouns have ending -e (Melpomene Melpomene 'Melpomene'), silent -e (Marguerite [maɾgaˈɾíːt] Marguerite [maɾgaˈɾíːte] 'Marguerite'), -o (Klȋo Klȋe 'Clio'), or a null ending (Artẹ̑mis Artẹ̑mide 'Artemis'), but most of them also have regularvernacular versions (Melpomena, Margerita, Artemida). The non-vernacular versions can also be declined following the third feminine declension.
- Latin and Greek names can change the stem from -s to -d (Artẹ̑mis Artẹ̑mide) 'Artemis', -n (Salamȋs Salamȋne 'Salamis'), or -r (Cȇres Cȇrere 'Ceres'). These also have vernacular versions for nominative singular (Artẹ̑mida, Salamȋna, Cȇrera).
- Mixed accent nouns have in nominative dual (along with the usual ending -i) ending -e that is accented (vóda vóde/vodẹ̄, nominative dual vódi/vodẹ̑).
- Some mixed accent nouns can in gentitive dual/plural also have ending -a (vóda genitive dual/plural vód/vodā 'stream, lake', cẹ́rkəv genitive dual/plural cẹ̑rkəv/cerkvā 'church') or -i (besẹ̑da genitive dual/plural besedī 'word')
- Nouns ending in a sonorant have an added fill vowel in genitive dual/plural. The fill vowel is usually /ə/, except before -j-, where the fill vowel is /i/. In some words, the fill vowel is not written, only pronounced (note that lj and nj represent only one sound when not followed by a vowel): dẹ́kla genitive dual/plural dẹ̑kəl 'maidservant', lādja genitive dual/plural lȃdij 'ship', zémlja genitive dual/plural zēməlj 'soil'.
- Nouns of which the stem ends in a vowel also have an added -j in genitive dual/plural if without an ending: ọ̑boa genitive dual/plural ọ̑boj etc.
- The noun gospá 'lady, madam' is irregular and has acute accent on all the endings except in vocative.

	Singular	Dual	Plural
Nominative	gospá	gospẹ́	gospẹ́
Genitive	gospẹ́	gospá	gospá
Dative	gospẹ́ / gospẹ́j (styl.)	gospẹ́ma	gospẹ́m
Accusative	gospọ́	gospẹ́	gospẹ́
Locative	gospẹ́ / gospẹ́j (styl.)	gospẹ́h	gospẹ́h
Instrumental	gospọ́	gospẹ́ma	gospẹ́mi
Vocative	gospȃ	gospẹ̑	gospẹ̑
styl. – stylistically marked

==== Fixed accent nouns ====
- Circumflex nouns are always circumflex:

	Long			Short		
	Singular	Dual	Plural	Singular	Dual	Plural
Nominative	slȗžba	slȗžbi	slȗžbe	də̏ska	də̏ski	də̏ske
Genitive	slȗžbe	slȗžb	slȗžb	də̏ske	də̏sk	də̏sk
Dative	slȗžbi	slȗžbama	slȗžbam	də̏ski	də̏skama	də̏skam
Accusative	slȗžbo	slȗžbi	slȗžbe	də̏sko	də̏ski	də̏ske
Locative	slȗžbi	slȗžbah	slȗžbah	də̏ski	də̏skah	də̏skah
Instrumental	slȗžbo	slȗžbama	slȗžbami	də̏sko	də̏skama	də̏skami
Vocative	slȗžba	slȗžbi	slȗžbe	də̏ska	də̏ski	də̏ske

- Acute nouns have circumflex accent in vocative, genitive dual/plural and instrumental singular. When used as an adverb, accusative and instrumental singular can only be circumflex, and nouns that can also have mixed accent also have accusative plural circumflex:

	Long			Short		
	Singular	Dual	Plural	Singular	Dual	Plural
Nominative	lípa	lípi	lípe	dèska [də̀ska]	dèski	dèske
Genitive	lípe	lȋp	lȋp	dèske	dèsk	dèsk
Dative	lípi	lípama	lípam	dèski	dèskama	dèskam
Accusative	lípo	lípi	lípe	dèsko	dèski	dèske
Locative	lípi	lípah	lípah	dèski	dèskah	dèskah
Instrumental	lȋpo	lípama	lípami	dèsko	dèskama	dèskami
Vocative	lȋpa	lȋpi	lȋpe	dèska	dèski	dèske

- Acute nouns allow both tones in instrumental singular if the stressed vowel is open-mid:

	Singular	Dual	Plural
Nominative	kóšnja	kóšnji	kóšnje
Genitive	kóšnje	kȏšenj	kȏšenj
Dative	kóšnji	kóšnjama	kóšnjam
Accusative	kóšnjo	kóšnji	kóšnje
Locative	kóšnji	kóšnjah	kóšnjah
Instrumental	kōšnjo	kóšnjama	kóšnjami
Vocative	kȏšnja	kȏšnji	kȏšnje

- r-stem and v-stem nouns change the accent a bit differently; circumflex nouns are still circumflex in all cases, but acute ones change to circumflex in vocative, instrumental singular and genitive dual/plural. If the nouns also allow mixed accent, then the mixed accent declension follows the same rules:

	Circumflex			Acute		
	Singular	Dual	Plural	Singular	Dual	Plural
Nominative	podražȋtəv	podražȋtvi	podražȋtve	cẹ́rkəv	cẹ́rkvi	cẹ́rkve
Genitive	podražȋtve	podražȋtəv	podražȋtəv	cẹ́rkve	cẹ̑rkəv	cẹ̑rkəv
Dative	podražȋtvi	podražȋtvama	podražȋtvam	cẹ́rkvi	cẹ́rkvama	cẹ́rkvam
Accusative	podražȋtəv	podražȋtvi	podražȋtve	cẹ́rkəv	cẹ́rkvi	cẹ́rkve
Locative	podražȋtvi	podražȋtvah	podražȋtvah	cẹ́rkvi	cẹ́rkvah	cẹ́rkvah
Instrumental	podražȋtvijo	podražȋtvama	podražȋtvami	cẹ̑rkvijo	cẹ́rkvama	cẹ́rkvami
Vocative	podražȋtəv	podražȋtvi	podražȋtve	cẹ̑rkəv	cẹ̑rkvi	cẹ̑rkve

==== Mobile accent nouns ====
Mobile accent nouns are very rare and are always circumflex:

	Singular	Dual	Plural
Nominative	Jȗno	Junọ̑ni	Junọ̑ne
Genitive	Junọ̑ne	Junọ̑n	Junọ̑n
Dative	Junọ̑ni	Junọ̑nama	Junọ̑nam
Accusative	Junọ̑no	Junọ̑ni	Junọ̑ne
Locative	Junọ̑ni	Junọ̑nah	Junọ̑nah
Instrumental	Junọ̑no	Junọ̑nama	Junọ̑nam
Vocative	Jȗno	Junọ̑ni	Junọ̑ne

==== Ending accent nouns ====
These nouns are short and circumflex, except if the accent is long; then they follow the same pattern as mixed accent nouns, but genitive dual/plural is circumflex if there is a null ending. The pattern is the same for words of which stems do not have a vowel and words which have the optional stress before the meglȁ → mègla shift.

	Singular	Dual	Plural
Nominative	stezȁ [stəzȁ]	stezȉ / stezẹ̑ (styl.)	stezȅ / stezẹ̑
Genitive	stezȅ / stezẹ̄ (styl.)	stȅz / stezá	stȅz / stezá
Dative	stezȉ	stezȃma	stezȁm
Accusative	stezȍ / stezọ̑ (styl.)	stezȉ / stezẹ̑ (styl.)	stezȅ / stezẹ̑
Locative	stezȉ	stezȁh	stezȁh
Instrumental	stezȍ / stezọ́ (styl.)	stezȃma	stezȃmi
Vocative	stezȁ	stezȉ / stezẹ̑ (styl.)	stezȅ / stezẹ̑
styl. – stylistically marked

==== Mixed accent nouns ====
These nouns can only be acute in nominative singular, but the stressed endings are acute, except genitive case, where both forms are allowed and in instrumental singular, where it is acute. In genitive dual/plural, they usually have an ending -a or -i, but if they do not, the vowel is acute, or acute or circumflex if it is a fill vowel /a/. All words can also have fixed accent, but nouns that in genitive dual/plural have a null ending have the same form as in the mixed accent.

	Genitive plural -a / -i			Genitive plural -ø			Genitive plural has a fill vowel		
	Singular	Dual	Plural	Singular	Dual	Plural	Singular	Dual	Plural
Nominative	góra	góri / gorẹ̑ (styl.)	gorẹ̑	nóga	nógi / nogẹ̑ (styl.)	nogẹ̑	óvca	óvci / ovcẹ̑ (styl.)	ovcẹ̑
Genitive	gorẹ̄	gorā	gorā	nogẹ̄	nọ́g	nọ́g	ovcẹ̄	ovāc	ovāc
Dative	góri	gorȃma	gorȁm	nógi	nogȃma	nogȁm	óvci	ovcȃma	ovcȁm
Accusative	gorọ̑	góri / gorẹ̑ (styl.)	gorẹ̑	nogọ̑	nógi / nogẹ̑ (styl.)	nogẹ̑	ovcọ̑	óvci / ovcẹ̑ (styl.)	ovcẹ̑
Locative	góri	gorȁh	gorȁh	nógi	nogȁh	nogȁh	óvci	ovcȁh	ovcȁh
Instrumental	gorọ́	gorȃma	gorȃmi	nogọ́	nogȃma	nogȃmi	ovcọ́	ovcȃma	ovcȃmi
Vocative	gȏra	gȏri / gorẹ̑ (styl.)	gorẹ̑	nȏgo	nȏgi / nogẹ̑ (styl.)	nogẹ̑	ȏvca	ȏvci / ovcẹ̑ (styl.)	ovcẹ̑

=== Second feminine declension (feminine i-stem declension) ===
The second feminine declension is less common. It is used primarily by the widely-productive abstract-noun suffix -ost, but a fair number of other nouns (mostly of Common Slavic origin) also follow it. The endings, however, are different if the noun follows the mixed or ending-accentual type or if the accent is always on the stem.

Second feminine declension endings
	Fixed and mobile accent			Ending and mixed accent		
	Singular	Dual	Plural	Singular	Dual	Plural
Nominative	-	-i	-i	-	-i	-i
Genitive	-i	-i	-i	-i	-i	-i
Dative	-i	-ma / -imi	-im	-i	-ema	-em
Accusative	-	-i	-i	-	-i	-i
Locative	-i	-ih	-ih	-i	-eh	-eh
Instrumental	-jo	-ma / -imi	-mi	-jo	-ema	-mi
Vocative	-	-i	-i	-	-i	-i

==== Alternations and other exceptions of the second feminine declension ====
- Nouns with stems that end in a non-sonorant consonant and a sonorant have a fill vowel inserted between them in nominative and accusative singular and add -i at the end of their stem in cases when the ending does not begin with a vowel (instrumental in all numbers and dative dual), such as mȋsəł mȋsli, instrumental singular mȋslijo, dative/instrumental dual mȋslima, instrumental plural mȋslimi 'thought' and svȋsli dative plural svȋslima 'hayloft'.
- Nouns with stems ending in -j have an ending -o in instrumental singular (pọ́stelj instrumental singular pọ̄steljo 'bed' (archaic)).
- When used as an adverb, some also change the accent, e.g., na pọ̑mlad 'in the spring', s pọ̑ti/s potȋ '[to move something] out of the way'.
- The feminine noun krȋ 'blood' follows the mixed-accent type, but replaces the final -v with -i in the nominative and accusative singular.

	Singular
Nominative	krȋ
Genitive	krvȋ
Dative	kŕvi
Accusative	krȋ
Locative	kŕvi
Instrumental	krvjọ́
Vocative	krȋ

==== Fixed accent nouns ====
- Nouns that are circumflex in nominative and genitive singular have circumflex accent in all cases, and the short accent becomes long:

	Long → long			Short → long		
	Singular	Dual	Plural	Singular	Dual	Plural
Nominative	pošȃst	pošȃsti	pošȃsti	nȉt	nȋti	nȋti
Genitive	pošȃsti	pošȃsti	pošȃsti	nȋti	nȋti	nȋti
Dative	pošȃsti	pošȃstma / pošȃstima	pošȃstim	nȋti	nȋtma / nȋtima	nȋtim
Accusative	pošȃst	pošȃsti	pošȃsti	nȉt	nȋti	nȋti
Locative	pošȃsti	pošȃstih	pošȃstih	nȋti	nȋtih	nȋtih
Instrumental	pošȃstjo	pošȃstma / pošȃstima	pošȃstmi	nȋtjo	nȋtma / nȋtima	nȋtmi
Vocative	pošȃst	pošȃsti	pošȃsti	nȉt	nȋti	nȋti

- Nouns that are acute in nominative and genitive singular follow two patterns, depending on whether the stress falls (in that case) on the second-to-last syllable or comes before, which in regular nouns translates into whether the stress is on the penultimate or the last syllable in nominative singular:

	Stress on the penultimate syllable			Stress on the last syllable		
	Singular	Dual	Plural	Singular	Dual	Plural
Nominative	stárost	stárosti	stárosti	lúč	lúči	lúči
Genitive	stárosti	stárosti	stárosti	lúči	lūči	lūči
Dative	stárosti	stárostma / stárostima	stárostim	lúči	lūčma / lúčima	lúčim
Accusative	stárost	stárosti	stárosti	lúč	lúči	lúči
Locative	stárosti	stárostih	stárostih	lúči	lūčih	lūčih
Instrumental	stārostjo	stárostma / stárostima	stárostmi	lȗčjo	lūčma / lúčima	lūčmi
Vocative	stȃrost	stȃrosti	stȃrosti	lȗč	lȗči	lȗči

- Nouns that are circumflex in nominative singular and acute in genitive singular change the accent in a very similar way to acute nouns. Vocative and Instrumental singular are circumflex, genitive dual/plural allows both accents, and locative dual/plural, instrumental dual and plural, and dative dual also allow both accents if the penultimate syllable is stressed.

	Singular	Dual	Plural
Nominative	mȉš	míši	míši
Genitive	míši	mīši	mīši
Dative	míši	mīšma / míšima	míšim
Accusative	mȉš	míši	míši
Locative	míši	mīših	mīših
Instrumental	mȋšjo	mīšma / míšima	mīšmi
Vocative	mȉš	mȋši	mȋši

==== Mobile accent nouns ====
These nouns can be either circumflex or acute in nominative singular, but all of them are circumflex in all other forms:

	Singular	Dual	Plural
Nominative	senóžet	senožẹ̑ti	senožẹ̑ti
Genitive	senožẹ̑ti	senožẹ̑ti	senožẹ̑ti
Dative	senožẹ̑ti	senožẹ̑tma / senožẹ̑tima	senožẹ̑tim
Accusative	senóžet	senožẹ̑ti	senožẹ̑ti
Locative	senožẹ̑ti	senožẹ̑tih	senožẹ̑tih
Instrumental	senožẹ̑tjo	senožẹ̑tma / senožẹ̑tima	senožẹ̑tmi
Vocative	senȏžet	senožẹ̑ti	senožẹ̑ti

==== Ending accent nouns ====
There are two subtypes. The first one is not purely ending accent as it has accent on the stem in dative and locative singular and appears if a long fill vowel is stressed in nominative singular. In that case, the e and o accented on the stem are open-mid. The other form is present if the short fill vowel is stressed in nominative singular.

	Long fill vowel			Short fill vowel (/ə/)		
	Singular	Dual	Plural	Singular	Dual	Plural
Nominative	ravȃn	ravnȋ	ravnȋ	debə̏r	debrȋ	debrȋ
Genitive	ravnȋ	ravnī	ravnī	debrȋ	debrī	debrī
Dative	rávni	ravnẹ̄ma	ravnẹ̄m	debrȉ	debrẹ̄ma	debrẹ̄m
Accusative	ravȃn	ravnȋ	ravnȋ	debə̏r	debrȋ	debrȋ
Locative	rávni	ravnẹ́h	ravnẹ́h	debrȉ	debrẹ́h	debrẹ́h
Instrumental	ravnjọ́	ravnẹ̄ma	ravnmí	debrijọ́	debrẹ̄ma	debrmí
Vocative	ravȃn	ravnȋ	ravnȋ	debə̏r	debrȋ	debrȋ

==== Mixed accent nouns ====
These nouns can only be circumflex and follow the same pattern as ending-accent nouns with long as a fill vowel. If the accent is on e or o in dative singular, the vowels are open-mid.

	Singular	Dual	Plural
Nominative	stvȃr	stvarȋ	stvarȋ
Genitive	stvarȋ	stvarī	stvarī
Dative	stvári	stvarẹ̄ma	stvarẹ̄m
Accusative	stvȃr	stvarȋ	stvarȋ
Locative	stvári	stvarẹ́h	stvarẹ́h
Instrumental	stvarjọ́	starẹ̄ma	stvarmí
Vocative	stvȃr	stvarȋ	stvarȋ

=== Third feminine declension (feminine declension without endings) ===
Third feminine declension follow nouns whose genitive singular (or in any other case) ending is a null ending (-). This declension follow surnames of women (but those ending in -a can also follow first feminine declension), female names, which do not have an ending -a or -e in nominative singular (except most of the Latin and Greek names), such as Kȃrin, Ȋnes, and KȊti, acronyms that keep the feminine gender of the word(s) they represent and do not end in an unstressed a (SAZȖ SAZU 'Slovenian Academy of Sciences and Arts' and ZDA ZDȂ) 'US', diminutives of female names and common nouns ending in -i (Ȃni Ȃni (a female name), Mȃlči Mȃlči (a female name), mȃmi mȃmi 'mommy', bȃbi bȃbi 'granny'), and some other words, such as spẹ̄cies spẹ̄cies.

Third feminine declension ending
	Singular	Dual	Plural
Nominative	-	-	-
Genitive	-	-	-
Dative	-	-	-
Accusative	-	-	-
Locative	-	-	-
Instrumental	-	-	-
Vocative	-	-	-

==== Alternations and other exceptions of the third feminine declension ====
- Some names can also follow first feminine declension (Rȗth Rȗthe/Rȗth 'Ruth')
- Sometimes, nouns nebọ́dijetrẹ́ba 'menace', nebọ́dijutrẹ́ba 'two menaces', and nebọ́dijihtrẹ́ba 'menaces' are considered one irregular noun instead of three nouns that only have a singular, dual, and a plural form, respectively. In that case, the infix -je- is changed to -ju- in dual and to -jih- in plural. The infix is actually a personal pronoun óna 'she' in genitive case:

	Singular	Dual	Plural
Nominative	nebọ́dijetrẹ́ba	nebọ́dijutrẹ́ba	nebọ́dijihtrẹ́ba
Genitive	nebọ́dijetrẹ́ba	nebọ́dijutrẹ́ba	nebọ́dijihtrẹ́ba
Dative	nebọ́dijetrẹ́ba	nebọ́dijutrẹ́ba	nebọ́dijihtrẹ́ba
Accusative	nebọ́dijetrẹ́ba	nebọ́dijutrẹ́ba	nebọ́dijihtrẹ́ba
Locative	nebọ́dijetrẹ́ba	nebọ́dijutrẹ́ba	nebọ́dijihtrẹ́ba
Instrumental	nebọ́dijetrẹ́ba	nebọ́dijutrẹ́ba	nebọ́dijihtrẹ́ba
Vocative	nebọ̑dijetrẹ̑ba	nebọ̑dijutrẹ̑ba	nebọ̑dijihtrẹ̑ba

==== Accent ====
Words declined this way always have fixed accent, which is the same throughout, no matter if it is circumflex or acute, long or short. The only exception is vocative, where the accent is circumflex.

	Circumflex			Acute			Short		
	Singular	Dual	Plural	Singular	Dual	Plural	Singular	Dual	Plural
Nominative	pọ̑lis	pọ̑lis	pọ̑lis	spẹ́cies	spẹ́cies	spẹ́cies	pietȁ	pietȁ	pietȁ
Genitive	pọ̑lis	pọ̑lis	pọ̑lis	spẹ́cies	spẹ́cies	spẹ́cies	pietȁ	pietȁ	pietȁ
Dative	pọ̑lis	pọ̑lis	pọ̑lis	spẹ́cies	spẹ́cies	spẹ́cies	pietȁ	pietȁ	pietȁ
Accusative	pọ̑lis	pọ̑lis	pọ̑lis	spẹ́cies	spẹ́cies	spẹ́cies	pietȁ	pietȁ	pietȁ
Locative	pọ̑lis	pọ̑lis	pọ̑lis	spẹ́cies	spẹ́cies	spẹ́cies	pietȁ	pietȁ	pietȁ
Instrumental	pọ̑lis	pọ̑lis	pọ̑lis	spẹ́cies	spẹ́cies	spẹ́cies	pietȁ	pietȁ	pietȁ
Vocative	pọ̑lis	pọ̑lis	pọ̑lis	spẹ̑cies	spẹ̑cies	spẹ̑cies	pietȁ	pietȁ	pietȁ

=== Fourth feminine declension (feminine i-/e-stem declension) ===
Fourth feminine declension follow nouns whose genitive singular ending is -e and genitive dual/plural is -ih. The nouns following this declension were derived from an adjective, and are therefore nominalized adjectives. The declension is the same as declension for definite feminine adjectives.

Fourth feminine declension endings
	Singular	Dual	Plural
Nominative	-a	-i	-e
Genitive	-e	-ih	-ih
Dative	-i	-ima	-im
Accusative	-o	-i	-e
Locative	-i	-ih	-ih
Instrumental	-o	-ima	-imi
Vocative	-a	-i	-e

This declension does not seem to have any alterations.

==== Accent ====
These nouns decline the same way as definite masculine forms of adjectives following the first adjectival declension. Therefore, only fixed- and ending-accentual types exist. For accent changes when nominalizing, see § Accent of nominalized adjectives.

=== First neuter declension ===
The vast majority of neuter nouns follow the first neuter declension. This declension follow nouns whose genitive singular ending is -a. These can have in nominative singular ending -o (following hard o-stem declension), -e (following soft o-stem declension), or a null ending (following one of the other declension subtypes), but in these cases, the stem ends in -e or -o.

==== Neuter o-/e-stem declension ====
The neuter o-stem declension closely resembles its masculine counterpart. The nominative and accusative always have the same form, however, with endings that differ from the masculine nouns. The genitive dual/plural has no ending like in the feminine a-stems. The neuter o-stems are divided between "hard" and "soft" stems, like the masculines.

Neuter o-stem endings
	Hard declension			Soft declension		
	Singular	Dual	Plural	Singular	Dual	Plural
Nominative	-o	-i	-a	-e	-i	-a
Genitive	-a	-	-	-a	-	-
Dative	-u / -i (styl.)	-oma	-om	-u / -i (styl.)	-ema	-em
Accusative	-o	-i	-a	-e	-i	-a
Locative	-u / -i (styl.)	-ih	-ih	-u / -i (styl.)	-ih	-ih
Instrumental	-om	-oma	-i	-em	-ema	-i
Vocative	-o	-i	-a	-e	-i	-a
styl. – the form is stylistically marked.

==== Neuter n-, s- and t-stem declensions ====
A small group of neuter nouns follow the neuter n-stem, neuter s-stem or neuter t-stem declensions. These use the same endings as the o-stems (except in nominative and accusative singular), but there is an additional consonant infix (-n-, -s-, -t-) that is present in all forms except the nominative/accusative singular. The n-stem and t-stem are soft in nominative/accusative singular, while in most s-stem nouns, the stem -e before the infix changes into -o. Since these nouns in nominative/accusative singular already end in -e/-o, there is a null ending.

	n-stem			s-stem (o → e)			s-stem (e → e)			t-stem		
	Singular	Dual	Plural	Singular	Dual	Plural	Singular	Dual	Plural	Singular	Dual	Plural
Nominative	imẹ̑	imẹ̑ni	imẹ̑na	telọ̑	telẹ̑si	telẹ̑sa	ojẹ̑	ojẹ̑si	ojẹ̑sa	deklȅ	deklẹ́ti	deklẹ̑ta
Genitive	imẹ̑na	imẹ̑n	imẹ̑n	telẹ̑sa	telẹ̑s	telẹ̑s	ojẹ̑sa	ojẹ̑s	ojẹ̑s	deklẹ́ta	deklẹ̑t	deklẹ̑t
Dative	imẹ̑nu / imẹ̑ni (styl.)	imẹ̑noma	imẹ̑nom	telẹ̑su / telẹ̑si (styl.)	telẹ̑soma	telẹ̑som	ojẹ̑su / ojẹ̑si (styl.)	ojẹ̑soma	ojẹ̑som	deklẹ̄tu / deklẹ̄ti (styl.)	deklẹ̄toma	deklẹ̑tom
Accusative	imẹ̑	imẹ̑ni	imẹ̑na	telọ̑	telẹ̑si	telẹ̑sa	ojẹ̑	ojẹ̑si	ojẹ̑sa	deklȅ	deklẹ́ti	deklẹ̑ta
Locative	imẹ̑nu / imẹ̑ni (styl.)	imẹ̑nih	imẹ̑nih	telẹ̑su / telẹ̑si (styl.)	telẹ̑sih	telẹ̑sih	ojẹ̑su / ojẹ̑si (styl.)	ojẹ̑sih	ojẹ̑sih	deklẹ̄tu / deklẹ̄ti (styl.)	deklẹ̑tih	deklẹ̑tih
Instrumental	imẹ̑nom	imẹ̑noma	imẹ̑ni	telẹ̑som	telẹ̑soma	telẹ̑si	ojẹ̑som	ojẹ̑soma	ojẹ̑si	deklẹ́tom	deklẹ̄toma	deklẹ̑ti
Vocative	imẹ̑	imẹ̑ni	imẹ̑na	telọ̑	telẹ̑si	telẹ̑sa	ojẹ̑	ojẹ̑si	ojẹ̑sa	deklȅ	deklẹ́ti	deklẹ̑ta
styl. – the form is stylistically marked

==== Alternations and other exceptions of the first neuter declension ====
- In mixed accentual types, unstressed e and o can either become /e/ or /o/, /ɛ/ or /ɔ/, or both (srebrọ̑ dative singular srẹ̄bru/srēbru 'silver', mesọ̑ dative singular mẹ̄su/mēsu 'meat').
- In the 19th century the ending -i was often used in the dative/locative singular instead of -u. For example, nominative mọ̑rje 'sea', dative/locative mọ̑rji. Nowadays this ending is considered archaic or dialectal.
- Some nouns with a stressed /ɛ/ or /ɔ/ can also have dual and plural forms with /e/ or /o/, such as ókno 'window', nominative plural ókna/ȏkna/ọ́kna and rébro 'rib', nominative plural rébra/rȇbra/rẹ́bra/rẹ̑bra.
- Nouns ending in a non-sonorant consonant and a sonorant or a sonorant followed by -r, -lj, or -nj, have a fill vowel /ə/ or /i/, if the stem ends in -j, when there is a null ending (ókno genitive plural óken 'window', poslọ̑pje genitive plural poslọ̑pij 'building')
- A few neuter s-stem nouns show the effects of the Slavic first palatalisation in the forms with the infix -es-:
  - The noun okọ̑ 'eye' has the stem očẹ̑s-. It also has a shorter plural stem oč- when referring to human eyes. This stem is feminine rather than neuter, and follows the mixed i-stem declension.
  - The noun uhọ̑ 'ear' has the stem ušẹ́s-, with a change in accent type. The genitive plural allows both accents.
  - The noun igọ̑ 'yoke' has the stem ižẹ̑s-.
- Nouns without a vowel in the stem add a fill vowel /ə/ in genitive dual/plural. Noun dnȍ 'bottom' has an ending -ov or, as tlȁ, has a fill vowel -a- (tlȁ tál/táł, dnȍ dnȍv/dán), but the -ovversion is preferred. Noun dnȍ is also irregular in locative where it is either dnȉh or dnẹ́h (dnȉh is preferred) and noun tlȁ is also irregular in locative and instrumental (nominative plural tlȁ locative plural tlẹ́h instrumental plural tlẹ́mi/tlí).
- Noun dŕva 'firewood' is also irregular, having two forms for locative and instrumental: nominative plural dŕva locative plural drvẹ́h/dr̄vih, instrumental plural drvmí/dŕvi. The irregular forms are preferred.
- Some nouns, such as črevọ̑ 'intestine' (stem črevẹ̑s-) lose the infix in the plural: črẹ́va.

==== Fixed accent nouns ====
Note that all these nouns have the same accent on dative and locative forms with ending in -i.

- Circumflex nouns are always circumflex, except in plural, where the ones that lose the infix are acute in nominative/accusative plural and follow acute accentuation in other cases:

	o-stem			s/t/n-stem			Loses the infix			Irregular (plural archaic)		
	Singular	Dual	Plural	Singular	Dual	Plural	Singular	Dual	Plural	Singular	Dual	Plural
Nominative	sọ̑nce	sọ̑nci	sọ̑nca	kolọ̑	kolẹ̑si	kolẹ̑sa	črevọ̑	črevẹ̑si	črẹ́va	okọ̑	očẹ̑si	ọ̑ka
Genitive	sọ̑nca	sọ̑nc	sọ̑nc	kolẹ̑sa	kolẹ̑s	kolẹ̑s	črevẹ̑sa	črẹ̑v	črẹ̑v	očẹ̑s	ọ̑k	ọ̑k
Dative	sọ̑ncu	sọ̑ncema	sọ̑ncem	kolẹ̑su	kolẹ̑soma	kolẹ̑som	črevẹ̑su	črevẹ̑soma	črẹ̑vom	očẹ̑su	očẹ̑soma	ọ̑kom
Accusative	sọ̑nce	sọ̑nci	sọ̑nca	kolọ̑	kolẹ̑si	kolẹ̑sa	črevọ̑	črevẹ̑si	črẹ́va	okọ̑	očẹ̑si	ọ̑ka
Locative	sọ̑ncu	sọ̑ncih	sọ̑ncih	kolẹ̑su	kolẹ̑sih	kolẹ̑sih	črevẹ̑su	črẹ̑vih	črẹ̑vih	očẹ̑su	ọ̑kih	ọ̑kih
Instrumental	sọ̑ncem	sọ̑ncema	sọ̑nci	kolẹ̑som	kolẹ̑soma	kolẹ̑si	črevẹ̑som	črevẹ̑soma	črẹ̑vi	očẹ̑som	očẹ̑soma	ọ̑ki
Vocative	sọ̑nce	sọ̑nci	sọ̑nca	kolọ̑	kolẹ̑si	kolẹ̑sa	črevọ̑	črevẹ̑si	črẹ̑va	okọ̑	očẹ̑si	ọ̑ka

- Nouns that are circumflex in nominative singular and acute in genitive plural allow both accents in locative and dative singular after preposition and in dual. They are circumflex in plural and acute in other forms in singular. The exception is the word uhọ̑, which is acute in other forms, except in vocative, where it is circumflex and genitive dual/plural, where it can also be circumflex:

	Short → long			Long → long		
	Singular	Dual	Plural	Singular	Dual	Plural
Nominative	deklȅ	deklẹ̄ti	deklẹ̑ta	uhọ̑	ušẹ́si	ušẹ́sa
Genitive	deklẹ́ta	deklẹ̑t	deklẹ̑t	ušẹ́sa	ušẹ̄s	ušẹ̄s
Dative	deklẹ́tu / deklẹ̄tu (+ prep.)	deklẹ̄toma	deklẹ̑tom	ušẹ́su	ušẹ́soma	ušẹ́som
Accusative	deklȅ	deklẹ̄ti	deklẹ̑ta	uhọ̑	ušẹ́si	ušẹ́sa
Locative	deklẹ̄tu	deklẹ̑tih	deklẹ̑tih	ušẹ́su	ušẹ́sih	ušẹ́sih
Instrumental	deklẹ́tom	deklẹ̄toma	deklẹ̑ti	ušẹ́som	ušẹ́soma	ušẹ́si
Vocative	deklȅ	deklẹ̑ti	deklẹ̑ta	uhọ̑	ušẹ̑si	ušẹ̑sa

- Most acute nouns have circumflex accent in plural and allow both accents in dual, except in vocative, where it is always circumflex:

	o-stem			s/t/n-stem		
	Singular	Dual	Plural	Singular	Dual	Plural
Nominative	kopíto	kopīti	kopȋta	víme	vīmeni	vȋmena
Genitive	kopíta	kopȋt	kopȋt	vímena	vȋmen	vȋmen
Dative	kopítu	kopītoma	kopȋtom	vímenu	vīmenoma	vȋmenom
Accusative	kopíto	kopīti	kopȋta	víme	vīmeni	vȋmena
Locative	kopítu	kopȋtih	kopȋtih	vímenu	vȋmenih	vȋmenih
Instrumental	kopítom	kopītoma	kopȋti	vímenom	vīmenoma	vȋmeni
Vocative	kopȋto	kopȋti	kopȋta	vȋme	vȋmeni	vȋmena

Acute nouns that are stressed on an open-mid vowel in nominative singular, diminutives ending in -ce in nominative singular, plurale tantum, and noun jájce are, if composed of two syllables, acute in nominative/genitive plural or allow both if the stressed vowel is open-mid. If the noun is composed of more than three syllables, then they allow both accents no matter the stressed vowel. Those that are acute or open-mid vowel in nominative/accusative plural (except close-mid vowel in nouns that can also be declined with an open-mid vowel) are circumflex or acute in genitive and locative dual/plural, and instrumental plural, except if the stressed vowel is open-mid (in that case the accent is circumflex in genitive dual/plural) or if the stem ends in -č or -r followed or preceded by at least one other consonant; these are circumflex in genitive and locative dual/plural, and instrumental plural. Dative plural is in all nouns accented the same as nominative plural. The accent in dual is either that of the singular or that of the plural form:

	Two syllables			More than two syllables			Open-mid vowel, two syllables		
	Singular	Dual	Plural	Singular	Dual	Plural	Singular	Dual	Plural
Nominative	jájce	jájci	jájca	nakoválce	nakovālci	nakovālca	ókno	ōkni	ōkna / ọ́kna
Genitive	jájca	jājc	jājc	nakoválca	nakovȃlc	nakovȃlc	ókno	ȏken / ọ́ken	ȏken / ọ́ken
Dative	jájcu	jájcema	jájcem	nakoválcu	nakovālcema	nakovālcem	óknu	ōknoma	ōknom / ọ́knom
Accusative	jájce	jájci	jájca	nakoválce	nakovālci	nakovālca	ókno	ōkni	ōkna / ọ́kna
Locative	jájcu	jājcih	jājcih	nakoválcu	nakovȃlcih	nakovȃlcih	óknu	ōknih / ọ́knih	ōknih / ọ́knih
Instrumental	jájcem	jājcema	jājci	nakoválcem	nakovālcema	nakovȃlci	óknom	ōknoma	ōkni / ọ́kni
Vocative	jȃjce	jȃjci	jȃjca	nakovȃlce	nakovȃlci	nakovȃlca	ȏkno	ȏkni	ȏkna / ọ̑kna
	Open-mid vowel, more than two syllables			Stem ending in -č or -r + cons.					
	Singular	Dual	Plural	Singular	Dual	Plural			
Nominative	rešéto	rešēti	rešēta / rešẹ̄ta	rébro	rébri	rēbra / rẹ́bra			
Genitive	rešéta	rešȇt / rešẹ̄t	rešȇt / rešẹ̄t	rébra	rȇber / rẹ̑ber	rȇber / rẹ̑ber			
Dative	rešétu	rešētoma	rešētom / rešẹ̄tom	rébru	rébroma	rēbrom / rẹ́brom			
Accusative	rešéto	rešēti	rešēta / rešẹ̄ta	rébro	rébri	rēbra / rẹ́bra			
Locative	rešétu	rešētih / rešẹ̄tih	rešētih / rešẹ̄tih	rébru	rȇbrih / rẹ̑brih	rȇbrih / rẹ̑brih			
Instrumental	rešétom	rešētoma	rešēti / rešẹ̄ti	rébrom	rébroma	rȇbri / rẹ̑bri			
Vocative	rešȇto	rešȇti	rešȇta / rešẹ̑ta	rȇbro	rȇbri	rȇbra / rẹ̑bra			

- Plurale tantum can additionally follow one of these two accent changes:

	V́	V́ V̄
	Plural	Plural
Nominative	vráta	ústa
Genitive	vrát	ūst
Dative	vrátom	ústom
Accusative	vráta	ústa
Locative	vrátih	ústih
Instrumental	vráti	ústi
Vocative	vrȃta	ȗsta

- Nouns stégno and lẹ́to change the accent irregularly. Stégno is circumflex in plural with close-mid vowel (alongside the regular open-mid vowel), even though it would be expected to be acute, and lẹ́to can only be acute in nominative and accusative plural:

	stégno			lẹ́to		
	Singular	Dual	Plural	Singular	Dual	Plural
Nominative	stégno	stēgni	stēgna / stẹ̑gna	lẹ́to	lẹ́ti	lẹ̑ta
Genitive	stégna	stȇgen / stẹ̑gen	stȇgen / stẹ̑gen	lẹ́ta	lẹ̑t	lẹ̑t
Dative	stégnu	stēgnoma	stēgnom / stẹ̑gnom	lẹ́tu	lẹ̄toma	lẹ̑tom
Accusative	stégno	stēgni	stēgna / stẹ̑gna	lẹ́to	lẹ́ti	lẹ̑ta
Locative	stégnu	stēgnih / stẹ̑gnih	stēgnih / stẹ̑gnih	lẹ́tu	lẹ̑tih	lẹ̑tih
Instrumental	stégnom	stēgnoma	stēgni / stẹ̑gni	lẹ́tom	lẹ̄toma	lẹ̑ti
Vocative	stȇgno	stȇgni	stȇgna / stẹ̑gna	lẹ̑to	lẹ̑ti	lẹ̑ta

==== Mobile accent nouns ====
These nouns are always acute in nominative singular, but can either be circumflex or acute in genitive singular. The circumflex stay circumflex in all other cases while acute ones further decline as fixed accent nouns which have short circumflex accent in nominative singular and are acute in genitive singular:

	Circumflex			Acute		
	Singular	Dual	Plural	Singular	Dual	Plural
Nominative	bédro	bedrẹ̑si	bedrẹ̑sa	téle	telẹ̄ti	telẹ̑ta
Genitive	bedrẹ̑sa	bedrẹ̑s	bedrẹ̑s	telẹ́ta	telẹ̑t	telẹ̑t
Dative	bedrẹ̑su / bedrẹ̑si (styl.)	bedrẹ̑soma	bedrẹ̑som	telẹ́tu / telẹ̄tu (+ prep.) / telẹ́ti (styl.) / telẹ̄ti (+ prep., styl.)	telẹ̄toma	telẹ̑tom
Accusative	bédro	bedrẹ̑si	bedrẹ̑sa	téle	telẹ̄ti	telẹ̑ta
Locative	bedrẹ̑su / bedrẹ̑si (styl.)	bedrẹ̑sih	bedrẹ̑sih	telẹ̄tu / telẹ̄ti (styl.)	telẹ̑tih	telẹ̑tih
Instrumental	bedrẹ̑som	bedrẹ̑soma	bedrẹ̑si	telẹ́tom	telẹ̄toma	telẹ̑ti
Vocative	bȇdro	bedrẹ̑si	bedrẹ̑sa	tȇle	telẹ̑ti	telẹ̑ta
styl. – the form is stylistically marked

==== Ending accent nouns ====
These nouns always have short accent, except in dative and instrumental singular, where the accent is the same (but acute if long) as their fixed accent counterparts (if the stem has a fill vowel, then the noun can also be declined as a fixed accent noun), or is long circumflex (acute according to Slovenski pravopis) open-mid o or long circumflex (acute according to Slovenski pravopis) closed-mid e if the stem does not have a vowel. Long vowel is also the fill vowel a in genitive dual/plural and if nouns have special ending in plural and some dual cases. These are dative plural ending is -ẹ̑m instead of -om / -em, locative dual/plural ending -ẹ́h instead of -ih, instrumental plural -mí / -ẹ̄mi instead of -i, and dative and instrumental dual ending is -ẹ̑ma instead of -oma / -ema. Nouns, where the accent is not on the last syllable in genitive dual/plural, allow both accents in that case.

	Regular			Special endings			Special endings
	Singular	Dual	Plural	Singular	Dual	Plural	Plural
Nominative	zlȍ	zlȉ	zlȁ	tlȍ	tlȉ	tlȁ	drvȁ
Genitive	zlȁ	zȅl	zȅl	tlȁ	tál	tál	dŕv
Dative	zlȕ / zlȉ (styl.)	zlȏma / zlóma	zlȍm	tlȕ / tlȉ (styl.)	tlȏma / tlóma	tlȍm	drvȍm
Accusative	zlȍ	zlȉ	zlȁ	tlȍ	tlȉ	tlȁ	drvȁ
Locative	zlȕ / zlȉ (styl.)	zlȉh	zlȉh	tlȕ / tlȉ (styl.)	tlẹ́h	tlẹ́h	drvẹ́h
Instrumental	zlȍm	zlȏma / zlóma	zlȉ	tlȍm	tlȏma / tlóma	tlẹ̄mi	drvmí
Vocative	zlȍ	zlȉ	zlȁ	tlȍ	tlȉ	tlȁ	drvȁ
styl. – the form is stylistically marked

==== Mixed accent nouns ====
Mixed accent nouns are always circumflex, except open-mid e and o allow both accents. Slovenski pravopis dictates that also closed-mid e and o allow both accents, but the Dictionary of Slovene written language does not. The same rules also apply to dative and genitive forms ending in -i, not written below due to simplicity.

	Regular			Open-mid vowel
	Singular	Dual	Plural	Singular
Nominative	blagọ̑	blȃgi	blȃga	prosọ̑
Genitive	blagȃ	blȃg	blȃg	prosȃ
Dative	blȃgu	blȃgoma	blȃgom	prōsu / prọ̑su (prọ́su)
Accusative	blagọ̑	blȃgi	blȃga	prosọ̑
Locative	blȃgu	blȃgih	blȃgih	prōsu / prọ̑su (prọ́su)
Instrumental	blȃgom	blȃgoma	blȃgi	prōsom / prọ̑som (prọ́som)
Vocative	blagọ̑	blȃgi	blȃga	prosọ̑

=== Second neuter declension (neuter a-stem declension) ===
Second neuter declension follow nouns whose genitive singular ending is -e. In modern Slovene, only pronouns jȁz 'I', tȋ 'you', and se(be), which is a reflexive personal pronoun are considered to follow this declension. Therefore, for the accent, endings, and alternations, see those three pronouns in the pronouns section.

=== Third neuter declension (neuter declension without endings) ===
Third neuter declension follow nouns whose genitive singular (or in any other case) ending is a null ending (-). This declension follow all nominalized cardinal numerals (when expressed with a number or a word) and verbs that are used as a noun (dóbro jẹ́sti dóbrega jẹ́sti 'eat well', but only a handful of other words, such as domȃ in the phrase ljubo doma kdor ga ima 'home sweet home'. This declension does not seem to have any alterations.

Third neuter declension endings
	Singular	Dual	Plural
Nominative	-	-	-
Genitive	-	-	-
Dative	-	-	-
Accusative	-	-	-
Locative	-	-	-
Instrumental	-	-	-
Vocative	-	-	-

==== Accent ====
These accents can only have fixed accent, which does not change, except the acute accent changes into circumflex in vocative.

	Circumflex			Acute			Short		
	Singular	Dual	Plural	Singular	Dual	Plural	Singular	Dual	Plural
Nominative	trȋ	trȋ	trȋ	éna	éna	éna	nȉč	nȉč	nȉč
Genitive	trȋ	trȋ	trȋ	éna	éna	éna	nȉč	nȉč	nȉč
Dative	trȋ	trȋ	trȋ	éna	éna	éna	nȉč	nȉč	nȉč
Accusative	trȋ	trȋ	trȋ	éna	éna	éna	nȉč	nȉč	nȉč
Locative	trȋ	trȋ	trȋ	éna	éna	éna	nȉč	nȉč	nȉč
Instrumental	trȋ	trȋ	trȋ	éna	éna	éna	nȉč	nȉč	nȉč
Vocative	trȋ	trȋ	trȋ	ȇna	ȇna	ȇna	nȉč	nȉč	nȉč

=== Fourth neuter declension (neuter i-/e-stem declension) ===
Fourth neuter declension follow nouns whose genitive singular ending is -ega. The nouns following this declension were derived from an adjective, and are therefore nominalized adjectives. The declension is the same as declension for neuter adjectives. Most of these nouns are geographical names and only have a singular form. This declension also differentiates between hard and soft stems, but only in nominative and accusative singular.

Fourth neuter declension
	Hard			Soft		
	Singular	Dual	Plural	Singular	Dual	Plural
Nominative	-o	-i	-a	-e	-i	-a
Genitive	-ega	-ih	-ih	-ega	-ih	-ih
Dative	-emu	-ima	-im	-emu	-ima	-im
Accusative	-o	-i	-a	-e	-i	-a
Locative	-em	-ih	-ih	-em	-ih	-ih
Instrumental	-im	-ima	-imi	-im	-ima	-imi
Vocative	-o	-i	-a	-e	-i	-a

This declension does not seem to have any alterations.

==== Accent ====
These nouns decline the same way as definite feminine forms of adjectives following the first adjectival declension do. Therefore, only fixed and ending accentual types exist. For accent changes when nominalizing, see § Accent of nomnalized adjectives.

=== Nouns that switch gender ===
- Some masculine nouns of Latin origin can be apart from being declined regularly in plural declined following the first neuter declension, such as frikatȋv 'fricative', nominative plural frikativa, genitive plural frikativ. The normal declension is usually preferred.
- Some neuter geographical names einding in -sko or -ško (Dolẹ̑njsko, Norvẹ̑ško) follow neuter declension in some cases and feminine in other. Neuter declension is mostly present only in locative after preposition na. These nouns however, are commonly split into two versions, one following the feminine declension and one following neuter declension:

	Feminine gender	Neuter gender
	Singular	Singular
Nominative	Dolẹ́njska	Dolẹ̑njsko
Genitive	Dolẹ́njske	Dolẹ̑njskega
Dative	Dolẹ́njski	Dolẹ̑njskemu
Accusative	Dolẹ́njsko / Dolẹ̑njsko (used as an adverb)	Dolẹ̑njsko
Locative	Dolẹ́njski	Dolẹ̑njskem
Instrumental	Dolẹ̑njsko	Dolẹ̑njskim
Vocative	Dolẹ̑njska	Dolẹ̑njsko

- Some mixed-accented neuter nouns can become masculine (along with the usual declension) in dual and plural, having an -ov- infix and following first masculine declension.
- Nouns following second masculine declension can be feminine or masculine in dual and plural, but in either case they decline the same, as described above.
- Noun okọ̑ when meaning 'eye' has plural očȋ, which further declines as a regular feminine i-stem noun with mixed accent.
- Noun pọ̄t has a stylistically marked plural and dual forms following neuter o-stem declension: pọ̑ti and pọ̑ta.
- Noun deklȅ is in vast majority of examples neuter, but can also dialectally or archaically be feminine, but still following the same declension.

=== Nouns composed of two or more words ===
When a noun composed of two or more words, sometimes all words are declined as they would be if alone, but there are additional rules.

==== Proper and common nouns ====
If all parts of a proper nouns grammatically match then all of them are declined, such as Ivan Cankar Ivana Cankarja 'Ivan Cankar' and Mokro Polje Mokrega Polja 'Mokro Polje'. The exception are surnames of females, which in most cases follow third declensions and have the same ending in all cases (Majda Vrhovnik Majde Vrhovnik 'Majda Vrhovnik'), but surnames following female declensions (usually ending in -a) can be also declined following the original declension (Ana Kopriva Ane Kopriva/Ane Koprive 'Ana Kopriva'). If both females and males with the same surname are mentioned, the surname is declined following original declension if the last name listed is male and follow the exception if the last name listed is female, but both first names are declined as they would normally: Pino in Pia Mlakar → Pina in Pie Mlakar (last listed first name is female) and Pia in Pino Mlakar → Pie in Pina Mlakarja (last listed first name is male). In combination of two names, such as Šmarje – Sap 'Šmarje–Sap' and Gozd – Martuljek 'Gozd–Martuljek', both nouns are declined (Šmarje – Sapa, Gozda – Martuljka).

If a part of the composed noun does not grammatically match, it usually follows third declensions, such as Hotel Turist (hotel named "Turist") Hotela Turista, except in some rare cases, such as Založba Lipa (publishing house named "Lipa") Založbe Lipe. If the first part of a compound loanword is considered an adjective or is considered not to be able to stan by itself, then this part also follows third declensions, such as Downing Street Downing Streeta 'Down Street', Kon Tiki Kon Tikija 'Kon Tiki', Monte Carlo Monte Carla 'Monte Carlo', U Tant U Tanta 'U Thant', Mao Cetung Mao Cetunga 'Mao Zedong', but some can be declined following the usual declension or the third, such as Rio de Janeiro Ria de Janeira/Rio de Janeira 'Rio de Janeiro'. Some of these names can also be shortened to only the first word, which in that case follows the usual declension Rio Ria 'Rio de Janeiro' and Mao Maa 'Mao'. Compound loanword nouns with unusual endings for their gender or number follow third declensions: Pickwick Papers Pickwick Papers 'Pickwhick Papers', École des Hautes Études École des Hautes Études 'École des Hautes Études'. Part of nouns, called predimki in Slovene (lit. forenames), part between the name and surname, which was originally usually an article, also follow third declensions: fra Bartolo fra Bartola, Dos Passos Dos Passosa. Some other common words that fall into this category are also van, von, de, Don, O', Las, Los, La, and M'.

When a common noun has a proper noun as a modifier, the proper noun in some cases follows the usual declension and sometimes the third: mesto Ljubljana mesta Ljubljane (the city of Ljubljana), reka Soča reke Soče (the Soča river), as opposed to kraj Mostec kraja Mostec (the town of Mostec), gostilna Gorjanc gostilne Gorjanc (a restaurant named "Gorjanc"). Some can be declined both ways, such as podjetje Iskra podjetja Iskra/podjetja Iskre (Iskra company).

==== Vernacular and Vernacularized nouns ====
In those cases, all words are declined as usual, such as črno zlato črnega zlata 'coal' and človek žaba človeka žabe, nominative plural ljudje žabe 'frogman', except when they are part of the same word written apart where the first part follows third declensions, such as vikend hiša 'holiday cottage' vikend hiše and žiro račun 'deposit account' žiro računa. In these cases, writing words together is favored (vikendhiša, žiroračun)

==== Non-vernacularized nouns ====
Nouns that are not fully integrated in Slovene (are not fully vernacularized) are split into two categories: quoted (citatne) and semi-quoted (polcitatne), depending on how much they are integrated.

All parts of masculine semi-quoted nouns are usually declined following the usual inflection pattern, which is either first, second, or fourth masculine declension, but some that have an unusual ending follow the third masculine declension: [[Sympathetic nervous system|nervus sympathicus]] nervusa sympathicusa, but [[curriculum vitae|curriculum vitae]] curriculuma vitae. Feminine semi-quoted nouns ending in -a in nominative singular are declined following the first feminine declension and others follow the third: [[alma mater|alma mater]] alme mater and [[Smilax aspera|Smilax aspera]] Smilax aspere.

Quoted nouns are declined as originally in the language they were borrowed from: [[alma mater|alma mater]] almae matris, [[curriculum vitae|curriculum vitae]] curriculi vitae, [[first lady|first lady]] first lady, nominative plural first ladies. This declension is always stylistically marked.

=== Masculinization and feminization of neuter nouns ===
Neuter nouns are either masculinized or feminized across a large part of the Slovene-speaking territory. Masculinization occurs in Upper Carniolan, Lower Sava Valley, Central Savinja, Horjul, Škofja Loka, Poljane, Selca, Črni Vrh, Ebriach, North Pohorje-Remšnik, and Mežica dialects, Kranjska Gora subdialect, and in parts of Rosen Valley, Juan Valley, Lower Carniolan, Central Styrian, and South Pohorje dialects. It is most commonly present in singular, and less in dual and plural. Masculinization varies from nouns binding with masculine forms of adjectives to completely change the declension, such as in Lower Sava Valley dialect. In that case nouns following the first neuter declension change to following first masculine, those following second neuter to following second masculine declension those following the third neuter to third masculine and those following fourth neuter to fourth masculine. Masculinized nouns following first declension have in genitive dual/plural a null ending, which is also present in some other masculine nouns. Mixed and mobile accentual type generally turns into fixed. Those following fourth declension have a null ending in nominative singular. The t-, s-, and n-stem nouns usually have the long stem in all cases.

Feminization of neuter nouns occurs in eastern Carinthian, northern Styrian, and many Panonian dialects. Feminization is the most common in plural, but is also very common in singular in dual. Similarly to masculinization, nouns following the first neuter declension change to following the first feminine, those following the second neuter to second feminine, those following the third neuter to third feminine and those following fourth neuter to fourth feminine. Mobile and mixed accentual type generally turn into fixed. The t-, s-, and n-stem nouns usually have the short stems in all cases, which is furthermore shortened, without the last o/e. The accent also changes accordingly to one syllable before, if the final o/e was accented.

== Adjectives, adjectival pronouns, numerals ==
Adjective declension is simpler than noun declension, as there are only two different inflection patterns. The first declension is the same as fourth noun declension for each case, while the second adjective declension is the same as third noun declensions (have a null ending in all cases). Adjectives can have all four accentual types. Adjectives can be compared in two ways, having three degrees of comparison in the first comparison (positive, comparative, superlative) and the second having two (positive and elative) and can be declined either by affixes or by adding other an adverb before it.

Declension of adjectival pronouns and irregular numerals is detailed in the pronouns and irregular numerals section.

=== Definite and indefinite adjectives ===
Adjectives in Slovene distinguish between indefinite and definite meanings. They correspond in meaning to the distinction between the English indefinite article a, referring to an unknown thing, and the definite article the, referring to a known thing. The definite form is also used in fixed noun phrases, where the combination of adjective and noun are to be understood as a single concept. Apart from that, they are also used under the following conditions:

- After possessive adjectives: posameznikov denarni prispevek 'individual's financial contribution'.
- After demonstrative pronouns, and the pronouns və̏s (except when meaning 'completely') (after tȃ, all forms become circumflex, except open-mid e and o allow both accents, and nȍv and mlȃd are irregular and are acute): njegov / ta denarni prispevek 'his / this financial contribution'.
- When the adjective denotes a special type of the noun: poprȃvni izpȋt 'retake exam', mȃterni jézik 'mother tongue'.
- When nominalized: Dežurni je tu. 'The doctor on-call (lit. on duty) is here.'; some proper nouns are exceptions.

The corresponding interrogative word for indefinite adjectives is kākšen and for definite adjectives katẹ̄ri for definite adjectives. Thus, definite forms behave like relational adjectives, which already mostly have an -i ending.

Definite adjectives have an ending -i in nominative and vocative singular. All other forms are usually the same for regular adjectives, acting as both indefinite and definite adjective, but adjectives that do not have fixed accent and some irregular adjectives change the stem or the accent, so all forms are differentiated.

For some adjectives, however, there are more differences between the indefinite and definite declensions:

- If the indefinite declension has acute accent, but circumflex accent in the feminine singular, the definite declension has acute accent throughout: prídni, síti, bogáti, blázni, feminine nominative singular prídna, síta, bogáta, blázna.
- If the indefinite declension is mixed, mobile or end-accented, the definite declension has fixed accent: bẹ́li, góli, tèmni. The only exception is when the stem does not have a vowel. Then it has ending accent.
- Some acute-stem adjectives (e.g. stȁr) switch to circumflex accentuation in the definite declension: stȃri.
- The adjective vélik (with stem velík-) can additionally have circumflex accent on the stem and a close-mid vowel in the definite declension: vẹ̑liki.
- The adjective mȃjhen changes the stem to mȃli.

In addition, not all adjectives have definite and indefinite form. Adjectives ending in -ov/-ev (bratov, borovničev) or -in (sestrin), adjectival pronouns, and adjectives and numerals ending in -i (slovenski, kmečki, neki, kateri) are (except some pronouns) definite by meaning, but only those ending in -i decline as definite adjectives, others decline as indefinite forms.

=== First adjective declension (adjective declension with endings) ===
Most of the adjectives follow the first declension, which changes the endings when declined. These adjectives, when nominalized, follow fourth declensions. The endings can be split into three groups of cases:

- The nominative and accusative, which are like the o-stems of masculine and neuter nouns, and the a-stems of feminine nouns. Like in nouns, a distinction is made between hard and soft stems, but this is only relevant for the neuter nominative/accusative singular, which has -o for hard stems and -e for soft stems.
- The other feminine singular cases, which also follow the a-stems of nouns.
- The remaining cases, which have endings unique to adjectives. These are the same for all three genders in the dual and plural.

The accusative singular is different if the adjective stays directly before the noun or not. In the latter case, masculine form allows only genitive ending, feminine only accusative and neuter allows both endings.

The masculine accusative singular before the adjective is like either the nominative or the genitive, as in masculine nouns. Which form is used depends on which form the accompanying noun uses, which in turn depends on whether the noun is animate or inanimate.

First adjective declension endings
Hard
		Singular			Dual			Plural		
		Masculine	Feminine	Neuter	Masculine	Feminine	Neuter	Masculine	Feminine	Neuter
Nominative	indef.	-	-a	-o	-a	-i		-i	-e	-a
Nominative	def.	-i	-a	-o	-a	-i		-i	-e	-a
Genitive		-ega	-e	-ega	-ih			-ih		
Dative		-emu	-i	-emu	-ima			-im		
Accusative	+ noun	nom or gen	-o	-o	-a	-i		-e	-e	-a
Accusative	− noun	-ega	-o	-o / -ega	-a	-i		-e	-e	-a
Locative		-em	-i	-em	-ih			-ih		
Instrumental		-im	-o	-im	-ima			-imi		
Vocative	indef.	-	-a	-o	-a	-i		-i	-e	-a
Vocative	def.	-i	-a	-o	-a	-i		-i	-e	-a
Soft
		Singular			Dual			Plural		
		Masculine	Feminine	Neuter	Masculine	Feminine	Neuter	Masculine	Feminine	Neuter
Nominative	indef.	-	-a	-e	-a	-i		-i	-e	-a
Nominative	def.	-i	-a	-e	-a	-i		-i	-e	-a
Genitive		-ega	-e	-ega	-ih			-ih		
Dative		-emu	-i	-emu	-ima			-im		
Accusative	+ noun	nom or gen	-o	-e	-a	-i		-e	-e	-a
Accusative	− noun	-ega	-o	-e / -ega	-a	-i		-e	-e	-a
Locative		-em	-i	-em	-ih			-ih		
Instrumental		-im	-o	-im	-ima			-imi		
Vocative	indef.	-	-a	-e	-a	-i		-i	-e	-a
Vocative	def.	-i	-a	-e	-a	-i		-i	-e	-a

==== Alternations and other exceptions of the first adjective declension ====
- Adjectives with mixed accent also have a form with an ending -e in nominative and accusative dual in feminine and neuter gender in addition to the usual -i: bẹ́l 'white', nominative dual: belẹ̑/belȋ/bẹ́li.
- A fill vowel in nominate singular when there is a null ending in some adjectives.

==== Fixed accent adjectives ====
Adjectives do not nearly change the accent as much when declined as nouns, however there are six different ways that can happen:

- If the adjective is long circumflex (or short if ə is accented) in nominative singular masculine and feminine form, then it is circumflex in all other forms.

		Singular			Dual			Plural		
		Masculine	Feminine	Neuter	Masculine	Feminine	Neuter	Masculine	Feminine	Neuter
Nominative	indef.	vesẹ̑ł	vesẹ̑la	vesẹ̑lo	vesẹ̑la	vesẹ̑li		vesẹ̑li	vesẹ̑le	vesẹ̑la
Nominative	def.	vesẹ̑li	vesẹ̑la	vesẹ̑lo	vesẹ̑la	vesẹ̑li		vesẹ̑li	vesẹ̑le	vesẹ̑la
Genitive		vesẹ̑lega	vesẹ̑le	vesẹ̑lega	vesẹ̑lih			vesẹ̑lih		
Dative		vesẹ̑lemu	vesẹ̑li	vesẹ̑lemu	vesẹ̑lima			vesẹ̑lim		
Accusative	+ noun	nom or gen	vesẹ̑lo	vesẹ̑lo	vesẹ̑la	vesẹ̑li		vesẹ̑le	vesẹ̑le	vesẹ̑la
Accusative	− noun	vesẹ̑lega	vesẹ̑lo	vesẹ̑lo / vesẹ̑lega	vesẹ̑la	vesẹ̑li		vesẹ̑le	vesẹ̑le	vesẹ̑la
Locative		vesẹ̑lem	vesẹ̑li	vesẹ̑lem	vesẹ̑lih			vesẹ̑lih		
Instrumental		vesẹ̑lim	vesẹ̑lo	vesẹ̑lim	vesẹ̑lima			vesẹ̑limi		
Vocative	indef.	vesẹ̑ł	vesẹ̑la	vesẹ̑lo	vesẹ̑la	vesẹ̑li		vesẹ̑li	vesẹ̑le	vesẹ̑la
Vocative	def.	vesẹ̑li	vesẹ̑la	vesẹ̑lo	vesẹ̑la	vesẹ̑li		vesẹ̑li	vesẹ̑le	vesẹ̑la

- If the adjective is long acute (or short if ə is accented) in nominative singular masculine and feminine form, then it is acute in all other forms, except in vocative, where it is circumflex.

		Singular			Dual			Plural		
		Masculine	Feminine	Neuter	Masculine	Feminine	Neuter	Masculine	Feminine	Neuter
Nominative	indef.	lísast	lísasta	lísasto	lísasta	lísasti		lísasti	lísaste	lísasta
Nominative	def.	lísasti	lísasta	lísasto	lísasta	lísasti		lísasti	lísaste	lísasta
Genitive		lísastega	lísaste	lísastega	lísastih			lísastih		
Dative		lísastemu	lísasti	lísastemu	lísastima			lísastim		
Accusative	+ noun	nom or gen	lísasto	lísasto	lísasta	lísasti		lísaste	lísaste	lísasta
Accusative	− noun	lísastega	lísasto	lísasto / lísastega	lísasta	lísasti		lísaste	lísaste	lísasta
Locative		lísastem	lísasti	lísastem	lísastih			lísastih		
Instrumental		lísastim	lísasto	lísastim	lísastima			lísastimi		
Vocative	indef.	lȋsast	lȋsasta	lȋsasto	lȋsasta	lȋsasti		lȋsasti	lȋsaste	lȋsasta
Vocative	def.	lȋsasti	lȋsasta	lȋsasto	lȋsasta	lȋsasti		lȋsasti	lȋsaste	lȋsasta

- If the adjective is long circumflex (or short if ə is accented) in nominative singular masculine form, but acute in feminine form, then it is acute in all other forms, except in vocative case, where it is circumflex.

		Singular			Dual			Plural		
		Masculine	Feminine	Neuter	Masculine	Feminine	Neuter	Masculine	Feminine	Neuter
Nominative	indef.	ljubeznȋv	ljubezníva	ljubeznívo	ljubezníva	ljubeznívi		ljubeznívi	ljubezníve	ljubezníva
Nominative	def.	ljubeznívi	ljubezníva	ljubeznívo	ljubezníva	ljubeznívi		ljubeznívi	ljubezníve	ljubezníva
Genitive		ljubeznívega	ljubezníve	ljubeznívega	ljubeznívih			ljubeznívih		
Dative		ljubeznívemu	ljubeznívi	ljubeznívemu	ljubeznívima			ljubeznívim		
Accusative	+ noun	nom or gen	ljubeznívo	ljubeznívo	ljubezníva	ljubeznívi		ljubezníve	ljubezníve	ljubezníva
Accusative	− noun	ljubeznívega	ljubeznívo	ljubeznívo / ljubeznívega	ljubezníva	ljubeznívi		ljubezníve	ljubezníve	ljubezníva
Locative		ljubeznívem	ljubeznívi	ljubeznívem	ljubeznívih			ljubeznívih		
Instrumental		ljubeznívim	ljubeznívo	ljubeznívim	ljubeznívima			ljubeznívimi		
Vocative	indef.	ljubeznȋv	ljubeznȋva	ljubeznȋvo	ljubeznȋva	ljubeznȋvi		ljubeznȋvi	ljubeznȋve	ljubeznȋva
Vocative	def.	ljubeznȋvi	ljubeznȋva	ljubeznȋvo	ljubeznȋva	ljubeznȋvi		ljubeznȋvi	ljubeznȋve	ljubeznȋva

- If the adjective is long acute (or short if ə is accented) in nominative singular masculine form, but circumflex in feminine form, then it is acute in all masculine and neuter forms, but allows both accents in other feminine singular forms. The same applies if nominative singular feminine form allows both accents.

		Singular			Dual			Plural		
		Masculine	Feminine	Neuter	Masculine	Feminine	Neuter	Masculine	Feminine	Neuter
Nominative	indef.	prídən	prȋdna	prídno	prídna	prídni		prídni	prídne	prídna
Nominative	def.	prídni	prȋdna	prídno	prídna	prídni		prídni	prídne	prídna
Genitive		prídnega	prīdne	prídnega	prídnih			prídnih		
Dative		prídnemu	prīdni	prídnemu	prídnima			prídnim		
Accusative	+ noun	nom or gen	prīdno	prídno	prídna	prídni		prídne	prídne	prídna
Accusative	− noun	prídnega	prīdno	prídno / prídnega	prídna	prídni		prídne	prídne	prídna
Locative		prídnem	prīdni	prídnem	prídnih			prídnih		
Instrumental		prídnim	prīdno	prídnim	prídnima			prídnimi		
Vocative	indef.	prȋdən	prȋdna	prȋdno	prȋdna	prȋdni		prȋdni	prȋdne	prȋdna
Vocative	def.	prȋdni	prȋdna	prȋdno	prȋdna	prȋdni		prȋdni	prȋdne	prȋdna

- If the adjective is short circumflex and ə is not stressed in nominative singular masculine form, and long circumflex in feminine form, then it is acute in all other masculine and neuter forms, but allows both accents in other feminine singular forms. The same applies if nominative singular feminine form allows both accents. The exception is surȍv, which is only circumflex in all forms.

		Singular			Dual			Plural		
		Masculine	Feminine	Neuter	Masculine	Feminine	Neuter	Masculine	Feminine	Neuter
Nominative	indef.	sȉt	sȋta	síto	síta	síti		síti	síte	síta
Nominative	def.	síti	sȋta	síto	síta	síti		síti	síte	síta
Genitive		sítega	sīte	sítega	sítih			sítih		
Dative		sítemu	sīti	sítemu	sítima			sítim		
Accusative	+ noun	nom or gen	sīto	síto	síta	síti		síte	síte	síta
Accusative	− noun	sítega	sīto	síto / sítega	síta	síti		síte	síte	síta
Locative		sítem	sīti	sítem	sítih			sítih		
Instrumental		sítim	sīto	sítim	sítima			sítimi		
Vocative	indef.	sȉt	sȋta	sȋto	sȋta	sȋti		sȋti	sȋte	sȋta
Vocative	def.	sȋti	sȋta	sȋto	sȋta	sȋti		sȋti	sȋte	sȋta

		Singular			Dual			Plural		
		Masculine	Feminine	Neuter	Masculine	Feminine	Neuter	Masculine	Feminine	Neuter
Nominative	indef.	surȍv	surȏva	surȏvo	surȏva	surȏvi		surȏvi	surȏve	surȏva
Nominative	def.	surȏvi	surȏva	surȏvo	surȏva	surȏvi		surȏvi	surȏve	surȏva
Genitive		surȏvega	surȏve	surȏvega	surȏvih			surȏvih		
Dative		surȏvemu	surȏvi	surȏvemu	surȏvima			surȏvim		
Accusative	+ noun	nom or gen	surȏvo	surȏvo	surȏva	surȏvi		surȏve	surȏve	surȏva
Accusative	− noun	surȏvega	surȏvo	surȏvo / surȏvega	surȏva	surȏvi		surȏve	surȏve	surȏva
Locative		surȏvem	surȏvi	surȏvem	surȏvih			surȏvih		
Instrumental		surȏvim	surȏvo	surȏvim	surȏvima			surȏvimi		
Vocative	indef.	surȍv	surȏva	surȏvo	surȏva	surȏvi		surȏvi	surȏve	surȏva
Vocative	def.	surȏvi	surȏva	surȏvo	surȏva	surȏvi		surȏvi	surȏve	surȏva

- If the adjective is short circumflex and ə is not stressed in nominative singular masculine form, but long acute in feminine form, then it is acute in all other forms.

		Singular			Dual			Plural		
		Masculine	Feminine	Neuter	Masculine	Feminine	Neuter	Masculine	Feminine	Neuter
Nominative	indef.	zelȅn	zeléna	zeléno	zeléna	zeléni		zeléni	zeléne	zeléna
Nominative	def.	zeléni	zeléna	zeléno	zeléna	zeléni		zeléni	zeléne	zeléna
Genitive		zelénega	zeléne	zelénega	zelénih			zelénih		
Dative		zelénemu	zeléni	zelénemu	zelénima			zelénim		
Accusative	+ noun	nom or gen	zeléno	zeléno	zeléna	zeléni		zeléne	zeléne	zeléna
Accusative	− noun	zelénega	zeléno	zeléno / zelénega	zeléna	zeléni		zeléne	zeléne	zeléna
Locative		zelénem	zeléni	zelénem	zelénih			zelénih		
Instrumental		zelénim	zeléno	zelénim	zelénima			zelénimi		
Vocative	indef.	zelȅn	zelȇna	zelȇno	zelȇna	zelȇni		zelȇni	zelȇne	zelȇna
Vocative	def.	zelȇni	zelȇna	zelȇno	zelȇna	zelȇni		zelȇni	zelȇne	zelȇna

==== Mobile accent adjectives ====
Adjectives with mobile accent are acute in nominative singular masculine form and can be either circumflex or acute in feminine form. Circumflex ones change the accent in other forms the same way as fixed-accented adjectives that are acute in masculine and circumflex in feminine, and acute ones are always acute. The only exception is definite form of vélik, vẹ̑liki and acts as a fixed accent adjective.

		Singular			Dual			Plural		
		Masculine	Feminine	Neuter	Masculine	Feminine	Neuter	Masculine	Feminine	Neuter
Nominative	indef.	bógat	bogȃta	bogáto	bogáta	bogáti		bogáti	bogáte	bogáta
Nominative	def.	bogáti	bogȃta	bogáto	bogáta	bogáti		bogáti	bogáte	bogáta
Genitive		bogátega	bogāte	bogátega	bogátih			bogátih		
Dative		bogátemu	bogāti	bogátemu	bogátima			bogátim		
Accusative	+ noun	nom or gen	bogāto	bogáto	bogáta	bogáti		bogáte	bogáte	bogáta
Accusative	− noun	bogátega	bogāto	bogáto / bogátega	bogáta	bogáti		bogáte	bogáte	bogáta
Locative		bogátem	bogāti	bogátem	bogátih			bogátih		
Instrumental		bogátim	bogāto	bogátim	bogátima			bogátimi		
Vocative	indef.	bȏgat	bogȃta	bogȃto	bogȃta	bogȃti		bogȃti	bogȃte	bogȃta
Vocative	def.	bogȃti	bogȃta	bogȃto	bogȃta	bogȃti		bogȃti	bogȃte	bogȃta

		Singular			Dual			Plural		
		Masculine	Feminine	Neuter	Masculine	Feminine	Neuter	Masculine	Feminine	Neuter
Nominative	indef.	débeł	debẹ́la	debẹ́lo	debẹ́la	debẹ́li		debẹ́li	debẹ́le	debẹ́la
Nominative	def.	debẹ́li	debẹ́la	debẹ́lo	debẹ́la	debẹ́li		debẹ́li	debẹ́le	debẹ́la
Genitive		debẹ́lega	debẹ́le	debẹ́lega	debẹ́lih			debẹ́lih		
Dative		debẹ́lemu	debẹ́li	debẹ́lemu	debẹ́lima			debẹ́lim		
Accusative	+ noun	nom or gen	debẹ́lo	debẹ́lo	debẹ́la	debẹ́li		debẹ́le	debẹ́le	debẹ́la
Accusative	− noun	debẹ́lega	debẹ́lo	debẹ́lo / debẹ́lega	debẹ́la	debẹ́li		debẹ́le	debẹ́le	debẹ́la
Locative		debẹ́lem	debẹ́li	debẹ́lem	debẹ́lih			debẹ́lih		
Instrumental		debẹ́lim	debẹ́lo	debẹ́lim	debẹ́lima			debẹ́limi		
Vocative	indef.	dȇbeł	debẹ̑la	debẹ̑lo	debẹ̑la	debẹ̑li		debẹ̑li	debẹ̑le	debẹ̑la
Vocative	def.	debẹ̑li	debẹ̑la	debẹ̑lo	debẹ̑la	debẹ̑li		debẹ̑li	debẹ̑le	debẹ̑la

Indefinite
		Singular			Dual			Plural		
		Masculine	Feminine	Neuter	Masculine	Feminine	Neuter	Masculine	Feminine	Neuter
Nominative		vélik	velīka	velíko	velíka	velíki		velíki	velíke	velíka
Genitive		velíkega	velīke	velíkega	velíkih			velíkih		
Dative		velíkemu	velīki	velíkemu	velíkima			velíkim		
Accusative	+ noun	nom or gen	velīko	velíko	velíka	velíki		velíke	velíke	velíka
Accusative	− noun	velíkega	velīko	velíko / velíkega	velíka	velíki		velíke	velíke	velíka
Locative		velíkem	velīki	velíkem	velíkih			velíkih		
Instrumental		velíkim	velīko	velíkim	velíkima			velíkimi		
Vocative		vȇlik	velȋka	velȋko	velȋka	velȋki		velȋki	velȋke	velȋka
Definite
		Singular			Dual			Plural		
		Masculine	Feminine	Neuter	Masculine	Feminine	Neuter	Masculine	Feminine	Neuter
Nominative		vẹ̑liki	vẹ̑lika	vẹ̑liko	vẹ̑lika	vẹ̑liki		vẹ̑liki	vẹ̑like	vẹ̑lika
Genitive		vẹ̑likega	vẹ̑like	vẹ̑likega	vẹ̑likih			vẹ̑likih		
Dative		vẹ̑likemu	vẹ̑liki	vẹ̑likemu	vẹ̑likima			vẹ̑likim		
Accusative	+ noun	nom or gen	vẹ̑liko	vẹ̑liko	vẹ̑lika	vẹ̑liki		vẹ̑like	vẹ̑like	vẹ̑lika
Accusative	− noun	vẹ̑likega	vẹ̑liko	vẹ̑liko / vẹ̑likega	vẹ̑lika	vẹ̑liki		vẹ̑like	vẹ̑like	vẹ̑lika
Locative		vẹ̑likem	vẹ̑liki	vẹ̑likem	vẹ̑likih			vẹ̑likih		
Instrumental		vẹ̑likim	vẹ̑liko	vẹ̑likim	vẹ̑likima			vẹ̑likimi		
Vocative		vẹ̑lik	vẹ̑lika	vẹ̑liko	vẹ̑lika	vẹ̑liki		vẹ̑liki	vẹ̑like	vẹ̑lika

==== Ending accent adjectives ====
Ending accents are usually stylistically marked and are circumflex when the ending is stressed, but the stem is acute (except fill vowels). The definite form is accented on the stem and o, e are close-mid, except if it does not have a vowel. Definite forms have fixed accent. If the stem does not have a vowel, then the first syllable is accentuated and acute if long. Some speakers can also accentuate indefinite forms the same as definite.

Indefinite
		Singular			Dual			Plural		
		Masculine	Feminine	Neuter	Masculine	Feminine	Neuter	Masculine	Feminine	Neuter
Nominative		brhə̏k	brhkȁ	brhkȍ	brhkȁ	brhkȉ		brhkȉ	brhkȅ	brhkȁ
Genitive		brhkegȁ	brhkȅ	brhkegȁ	brhkȉh			brhkȉh		
Dative		brhkemȕ	brhkȉ	brhkemȕ	brhkimȁ			brhkȉm		
Accusative	+ noun	nom or gen	brhkȍ	brhkȍ	brhkȁ	brhkȉ		brhkȅ	brhkȅ	brhkȁ
Accusative	− noun	brhkegȁ	brhkȍ	brhkȍ / brhkegȁ	brhkȁ	brhkȉ		brhkȅ	brhkȅ	brhkȁ
Locative		brhkȅm	brhkȉ	brhkȅm	brhkȉh			brhkȉh		
Instrumental		brhkȉm	brhkȍ	brhkȉm	brhkimȁ			brhkimȉ		
Vocative		brhə̏k	brhkȁ	brhkȍ	brhkȁ	brhkȉ		brhkȉ	brhkȅ	brhkȁ
Definite
		Singular			Dual			Plural		
		Masculine	Feminine	Neuter	Masculine	Feminine	Neuter	Masculine	Feminine	Neuter
Nominative		bŕhki	bŕhka	bŕhko	bŕhka	bŕhki		bŕhki	bŕhke	bŕhka
Genitive		bŕhkega	bŕhke	bŕhkega	bŕhkih			bŕhkih		
Dative		bŕhkemu	bŕhki	bŕhkemu	bŕhkima			bŕhkim		
Accusative	+ noun	nom or gen	bŕhko	bŕhko	bŕhka	bŕhki		bŕhke	bŕhke	bŕhka
Accusative	− noun	bŕhkega	bŕhko	bŕhko / bŕhkega	bŕhka	bŕhki		bŕhke	bŕhke	bŕhka
Locative		bŕhkem	bŕhki	bŕhkem	bŕhkih			bŕhkih		
Instrumental		bŕhkim	bŕhko	bŕhkim	bŕhkima			bŕhkimi		
Vocative		bȓhki	bȓhka	bȓhko	bȓhka	bȓhki		bȓhki	bȓhke	bȓhka

Indefinite
		Singular			Dual			Plural		
		Masculine	Feminine	Neuter	Masculine	Feminine	Neuter	Masculine	Feminine	Neuter
Nominative		zə̏ł	zlȁ	zlȍ	zlȁ	zlȉ		zlȉ	zlȅ	zlȁ
Genitive		zlegȁ	zlȅ	zlegȁ	zlȉh			zlȉh		
Dative		zlemȕ	zlȉ	zlemȕ	zlimȁ			zlȉm		
Accusative	+ noun	nom or gen	zlȍ	zlȍ	zlȁ	zlȉ		zlȅ	zlȅ	zlȁ
Accusative	− noun	zlegȁ	zlȍ	zlȍ / zlegȁ	zlȁ	zlȉ		zlȅ	zlȅ	zlȁ
Locative		zlȅm	zlȉ	zlȅm	zlȉh			zlȉh		
Instrumental		zlȉm	zlȍ	zlȉm	zlimȁ			zlimȉ		
Vocative		zə̏ł	zlȁ	zlȍ	zlȁ	zlȉ		zlȉ	zlȅ	zlȁ
Definite
		Singular			Dual			Plural		
		Masculine	Feminine	Neuter	Masculine	Feminine	Neuter	Masculine	Feminine	Neuter
Nominative		zlȉ	zlȁ	zlȍ	zlȁ	zlȉ		zlȉ	zlȅ	zlȁ
Genitive		zléga	zlȅ	zléga	zlȉh			zlȉh		
Dative		zlému	zlȉ	zlému	zlíma			zlȉm		
Accusative	+ noun	nom or gen	zlȍ	zlȍ	zlȁ	zlȉ		zlȅ	zlȅ	zlȁ
Accusative	− noun	zléga	zlȍ	zlȍ / zléga	zlȁ	zlȉ		zlȅ	zlȅ	zlȁ
Locative		zlȅm	zlȉ	zlȅm	zlȉh			zlȉh		
Instrumental		zlȉm	zlȍ	zlȉm	zlíma			zlími		
Vocative		zlȉ	zlȁ	zlȍ	zlȁ	zlȉ		zlȉ	zlȅ	zlȁ

==== Mixed accent adjectives ====
There are two different ways mixed accent adjectives are declined, with short or long stress on endings, most of them following the first way.

The first way can have, along with the fixed accentuation, the ending accented only in nominative and vocative singular neuter form, accusative singular feminine and neuter form, and nominative and vocative dual and plural in all forms. However, some of these accents are stylistically marked:

- If both fixed and ending accents are used about the same in nominative/vocative singular neuter form, then fixed accent is favored in other forms.
- If fixed accent is favored, but ending is not stylistically marked in nominative/vocative singular neuter form, then ending accent is stylistically marked in other forms.
- If ending accent is stylistically marked in nominative/vocative singular neuter form, then it can only have accent on the stem in other forms, forms with accent on the ending are obsolete.

Moreover, in nominative and accusative dual in feminine and neuter form these adjectives can also have a stylistically marked ending -ẹ̑ in addition to the usual -i. They follow one of the fixed accent tone changes if the accent is on the stem. If the feminine nominative singular form is acute, then other accents are acute. If it is circumflex, then it is circumflex in all forms. The endings are always circumflex. Definite forms have fixed accent that is the same as "other" forms. The exceptions are mlȃd when meaning 'offspring' or 'young people/animals', sȃm, dȏlg, and stȁr when it is nominalized or in collocations. These forms are always circumflex.

Indefinite
		Singular			Dual			Plural		
		Masculine	Feminine	Neuter	Masculine	Feminine	Neuter	Masculine	Feminine	Neuter
Nominative		bŕhək	bŕhka	bŕhko / brhkọ̑	bŕhka / brhkȃ	bŕhki / brhkȋ / brhkẹ̑ (styl.)		bŕhki / brhkȋ	bŕhke / brhkẹ̑	bŕhka / brhkȃ
Genitive		bŕhkega	bŕhke	bŕhkega	bŕhkih			bŕhkih		
Dative		bŕhkemu	bŕhki	bŕhkemu	bŕhkima			bŕhkim		
Accusative	+ noun	nom or gen	bŕhko / brhkọ̑	bŕhko / brhkọ̑	bŕhka / brhkȃ	bŕhki / brhkȋ / brhkẹ̑ (styl.)		bŕhke / brhkẹ̑	bŕhke / brhkẹ̑	bŕhka / brhkȃ
Accusative	− noun	bŕhkega	bŕhko / brhkọ̑	bŕhko / brhkọ̑ / bŕhkega	bŕhka / brhkȃ	bŕhki / brhkȋ / brhkẹ̑ (styl.)		bŕhke / brhkẹ̑	bŕhke / brhkẹ̑	bŕhka / brhkȃ
Locative		bŕhkem	bŕhki	bŕhkem	bŕhkih			bŕhkih		
Instrumental		bŕhkim	bŕhko	bŕhkim	bŕhkima			bŕhkimi		
Vocative		bȓhək	bȓhka	bȓhko / brhkọ̑	bȓhka / brhkȃ	bȓhki / brhkȋ / brhkẹ̑ (styl.)		bȓhki / brhkȋ	bȓhke / brhkȇ	bȓhka / brhkȃ
Definite
		Singular			Dual			Plural		
		Masculine	Feminine	Neuter	Masculine	Feminine	Neuter	Masculine	Feminine	Neuter
Nominative		bŕhki	bŕhka	bŕhko	bŕhka	bŕhki		bŕhki	bŕhke	bŕhka
Genitive		bŕhkega	bŕhke	bŕhkega	bŕhkih			bŕhkih		
Dative		bŕhkemu	bŕhki	bŕhkemu	bŕhkima			bŕhkim		
Accusative	+ noun	nom or gen	bŕhko	bŕhko	bŕhka	bŕhki		bŕhke	bŕhke	bŕhka
Accusative	− noun	bŕhkega	bŕhko	bŕhko / bŕhkega	bŕhka	bŕhki		bŕhke	bŕhke	bŕhka
Locative		bŕhkem	bŕhki	bŕhkem	bŕhkih			bŕhkih		
Instrumental		bŕhkim	bŕhko	bŕhkim	bŕhkima			bŕhkimi		
Vocative		bȓhki	bȓhka	bȓhko	bȓhka	bȓhki		bȓhki	bȓhke	bȓhka
styl. – stylistically marked

The second way with short accents is that the accent is on the stem only in nominative singular, and on the ending in all other forms. All adjectives following this pattern can also have fixed accent, and can only have fixed accent in definite forms. The ending is always short circumflex and definite form is acute.

Indefinite
		Singular			Dual			Plural		
		Masculine	Feminine	Neuter	Masculine	Feminine	Neuter	Masculine	Feminine	Neuter
Nominative		tə̏šč	teščȁ	teščȅ	teščȁ	teščȉ		teščȉ	teščȅ	teščȁ
Genitive		teščegȁ	teščȅ	teščegȁ	teščȉh			teščȉh		
Dative		teščemȕ	teščȉ	teščemȕ	teščimȁ			teščȉm		
Accusative	+ noun	nom or gen	teščȍ	teščȅ	teščȁ	teščȉ		teščȅ	teščȅ	teščȁ
Accusative	− noun	teščegȁ	teščȍ	teščȅ / teščegȁ	teščȁ	teščȉ		teščȅ	teščȅ	teščȁ
Locative		teščȅm	teščȉ	teščȅm	teščȉh			teščȉh		
Instrumental		teščȉm	teščȍ	teščȉm	teščȁ			teščimȉ		
Vocative		tə̏šč	teščȁ	teščȅ	teščȁ	teščȉ		teščȉ	teščȅ	teščȁ
Definite
		Singular			Dual			Plural		
		Masculine	Feminine	Neuter	Masculine	Feminine	Neuter	Masculine	Feminine	Neuter
Nominative		tèšči	tèšča	tèšče	tèšča	tèšči		tèšči	tèšče	tèšča
Genitive		tèščega	tèšče	tèščega	tèščih			tèščih		
Dative		tèščemu	tèšči	tèščemu	tèščima			tèščim		
Accusative	+ noun	nom or gen	tèščo	tèšče	tèšča	tèšči		tèšče	tèšče	tèšča
Accusative	− noun	tèščega	tèščo	tèšče / tèščega	tèšča	tèšči		tèšče	tèšče	tèšča
Locative		tèščem	tèšči	tèščem	tèščih			tèščih		
Instrumental		tèščim	tèščo	tèščim	tèščima			tèščimi		
Vocative		tȅšči	tȅšča	tȅšče	tȅšča	tȅšči		tȅšči	tȅšče	tȅšča

==== Mobile and mixed accent adjectives ====
These adjectives decline as mobile accent adjectives, but also have the ending-accentuated forms of the adjectivves following the first way of mixed accentual type.

Indefinite
		Singular			Dual			Plural		
		Masculine	Feminine	Neuter	Masculine	Feminine	Neuter	Masculine	Feminine	Neuter
Nominative		bolȃn	bólna	bólno / bolnọ̑	bólna / bolnȃ (styl.)	bólni / bolnȋ (styl.) / bolnẹ̑ (styl.)		bólni / bolnȋ (styl.)	bólne / bolnẹ̑ (styl.)	bólna / bolnȃ (styl.)
Genitive		bólnega	bólne	bólnega	bólnih			bólnih		
Dative		bólnemu	bólni	bólnemu	bólnima			bólnim		
Accusative	+ noun	nom or gen	bólno / bolnọ̑ (styl.)	bólno / bolnọ̑	bólna / bolnȃ	bólni / bolnȋ (styl.) / bolnẹ̑ (styl.)		bólne / bolnẹ̑ (styl.)	bólne / bolnẹ̑ (styl.)	bólna / bolnȃ (styl.)
Accusative	− noun	bólnega	bólno / bolnọ̑ (styl.)	bólno / bolnọ̑ / bólnega	bólna / bolnȃ	bólni / bolnȋ (styl.) / bolnẹ̑ (styl.)		bólne / bolnẹ̑ (styl.)	bólne / bolnẹ̑ (styl.)	bólna / bolnȃ (styl.)
Locative		bólnem	bólni	bólnem	bólnih			bólnih		
Instrumental		bólnim	bólno	bólnim	bólnima			bólnimi		
Vocative		bolȃn	bȏlna	bȏlno / bolnọ̑	bȏlna / bolnȃ (styl.)	bȏlni / bolnȋ (styl.) / bolnẹ̑ (styl.)		bȏlni / bolnȋ (styl.)	bȏlne / bolnȇ (styl.)	bȏlna / bolnȃ (styl.)
Definite
		Singular			Dual			Plural		
		Masculine	Feminine	Neuter	Masculine	Feminine	Neuter	Masculine	Feminine	Neuter
Nominative		bólni	bólna	bólno	bólna	bólni		bólni	bólne	bólna
Genitive		bólnega	bólne	bólnega	bólnih			bólnih		
Dative		bólnemu	bólni	bólnemu	bólnima			bólnim		
Accusative	+ noun	nom or gen	bólno	bólno	bólna	bólni		bólne	bólne	bólna
Accusative	− noun	bólnega	bólno	bólno / bólnega	bólna	bólni		bólne	bólne	bólna
Locative		bólnem	bólni	bólnem	bólnih			bólnih		
Instrumental		bólnim	bólno	bólnim	bólnima			bólnimi		
Vocative		bólni	bólna	bólno	bólna	bólni		bólni	bólne	bólna
styl. – stylistically marked

=== Second adjective declension (adjective declension without endings) ===
Some adjectives, especially the ones derived recently from loanwords (bẹ̑ž 'beige', instȃnt 'instant', rọ̑za 'pink' – derived from Italian rosa or German rosa) decline without changing the endings. When nominalized, they usually decline following third declensions. These adjectives also don't differentiate between definite and indefinite forms and the ending does not change when not followed by noun.

Second adjective declension endings
	Singular			Dual			Plural		
	Masculine	Feminine	Neuter	Masculine	Feminine	Neuter	Masculine	Feminine	Neuter
Nominative	-			-			-		
Genitive	-			-			-		
Dative	-			-			-		
Accusative	-			-			-		
Locative	-			-			-		
Instrumental	-			-			-		
Vocative	-			-			-		

==== Accent ====
The accent is always fixed and does not change, except in vocative, where acute changes into circumflex.

	Singular			Dual			Plural		
	Masculine	Feminine	Neuter	Masculine	Feminine	Neuter	Masculine	Feminine	Neuter
Nominative	pocẹ́ni			pocẹ́ni			pocẹ́ni		
Genitive	pocẹ́ni			pocẹ́ni			pocẹ́ni		
Dative	pocẹ́ni			pocẹ́ni			pocẹ́ni		
Accusative	pocẹ́ni			pocẹ́ni			pocẹ́ni		
Locative	pocẹ́ni			pocẹ́ni			pocẹ́ni		
Instrumental	pocẹ́ni			pocẹ́ni			pocẹ́ni		
Vocative	pocẹ̑ni			pocẹ̑ni			pocẹ̑ni		

=== Words that can follow both declensions ===
Cardinal numerals from five onward can be declined both ways. Smaller numbers (up to 100) are usually declined using first declension (pẹ̑t pétih/pẹ̑t 'five'), and bigger (1000 and onwards) using second declension (milijọ̑n milijọ̑n/milijọ̑nih 'million'). Declining big numbers using first declension is really uncommon. Noun nȉč 'zero' can also be declined both ways. If the numeral is composed of more words, only the last one follows first declension (stọ̑ pẹ̑t, stọ̑ pétih 'one hundred five'). When all numerals are written with a number, they always follow second declension.

Indefinite numerals ending in -o and collective numerals ending in -o or -e can also decline both ways: kọ̄liko, kọ̄likih/kọ̄liko; petẹ̑ro, petẹ̑rih/petẹ̑ro.

=== Formation of adverbs ===
Adverbs formed from adjectives have an ending in -o for hard stems and -e for soft stems. If not otherwise noted, adverbs keep the same tone as the adjective in nominative singular neuter form (the second form in the given examples below). Adverbs formed from fixed and mobile accent adjectives keep accent on the stem, those derived from ending accent nouns or from those following the second form of mixed accents (with short accents on ending) have the accent on the ending, which is long circumflex for hard stems and short circumflex for soft stems. Adverbs formed from mobile and mixed or only mixed nouns following the first pattern (with long accents on endings) can have the accent either on the stem or the ending. If the ending accent was stylistically marked in neuter nominative singular form, it is not marked, just less common.

Adjectives ending in -ski, -ški, or -čki also have a stylistically marked form ending in -i.

- lísast → lísasto → lísasto
- zelȅn → zeléno → zeléno
- brhȅk → brhkȍ → brhkȏ
- tə̏šč → teščȅ → teščȅ
- bolȃn → bólno / bolnọ̑ → bólno / bolnọ̑
- prȍst → prósto / prostọ̑ (stylistically marked) → prósto / prostọ̑
- kmẹ̑čki → kmẹ̑čko → kmẹ̑čko / kmẹ̑čki (stylistically marked)

=== Comparison ===
For all adjectives, comparative, superlative and elative are formed periphrastically, using the adverbs bȍlj 'more', nȁjbolj/nȃjbolj 'most', and prevȅč 'too (much)' or many other adverbs similar in meaning, respectively. For some adjectives, especially more basic or old ones, the comparative and superlative can also be formed with affixes. These can still be compared periphrastically, but the form with affixes is usually favored.

There are three affixes used to form the comparative: -ši, -ji and -ejši. Which one is used depends in a large part on the shape of the adjective's stem, although these are not hard rules and there are some exceptions. The superlative is formed from the comparative by prefixing nȁj- / nȃj- to it. Elative is formed from positive prefixng prȅ- to it. Elative can be formed periphrastically by all adjectives. If adjective can be compared periphrastically, this form is favored.

Adjectives ending in -ȁt (bradȁt), -ast (kọ́drast), -ȁv/-ȃv/-av (klepetȁv), -ən (láčen), participles and colors are usually compared periphrastically, but there are exceptions as some can also be compared with affixes, which are not favored. (bẹ́l → bȍlj bẹ́l/belȇjši).

Compared adjectives declines as either always acute or always circumflex fixed accent adjectives. Some adjectives lack positive and elative form; these are then sorted in dictionaries by the comparative.

The suffix -ši is used with one-syllable adjectives ending in b, d or p, preceded by a vowel or /ər/. After a vowel, d becomes j, and after r it disappears altogether. The suffix is also used with adjectives ending in -ok or -ek, which is dropped in the comparative, and along with the previous changes, t also changes to j and other consonants are iotated.

- lẹ̑p (stem lẹ́p-) → lẹ̑pši
- slȁb (stem sláb-) → slȃbši
- mlȃd (stem mlád-) → mlȃjši
- hȗd (stem húd-) → hȗjši
- gȓd (stem gŕd-) → gȓši
- širȍk → šȋrši
- krátek → krȃjši
- tánek → tȃnjši

The suffix -ji is used with one-syllable adjectives ending in g, h or k. In the comparative, these change to their palatalised variants ž, š and č respectively. The suffix is also used with adjectives ending in -ok or -ek preceded by one of these consonants. Again, the suffix is dropped and the final consonant is iotated. The stem is always circumflex, the only exception is the last example.

- drȃg (stem drág-) → drȃžji
- tȋh (stem tíh-) → tíšji
- blȃg (stem blág- or blȃg-) → blȃžji
- strọ̑g (stem strọ́g- or strọ̑g-) → strọ̑žji
- téžek → tẹ̑žji
- globȍk → glọ̑blji
- stȁr → stárji (stylistically marked)

The suffix -ejši is used in all other cases, including one-syllable adjectives ending in more than one consonant or adjectives with more than one syllable. Some adjectives keep the accent on the stem, and is then the same as the stem accent in nominative singular neuter form, or the suffix may be circumflex accented -ȇjši with an open-mid vowel. The latter case is more typical for ending and mixed accent adjectives while the first form is more typical for fixed and mobile accent adjectives.

- nȍv (stem nóv-) → novȇjši
- krȗt (stem krút- or krȗt-) → krútejši / krȗtejši
- fȋn → finȇjši
- gọ̑st (stem gọ́st-) → gostȇjši
- pȏln (stem póln-) → pólnejši
- grének → grenkȇjši
- neváren → nevárnejši

==== Comparison of adverbs ====
Adverbs compare the same way as adjectives do, but the š in the ending can be omitted, except in -ši (not preceded by j), and final i in the ending turns into e. Those declined with suffix -je, which have č, š, or ž before the ending can also have ending -e. Only the ending -ȇj(š)e allows accent on the ending, in other forms only fixed accent remains. The accent also changes the same way as with adjectives, the three exceptions are the last two examples, where comparative allows both accents.

- lẹ́po / lepọ̑→ lẹ̑pše
- krátko / kratkọ̑ → krȃjše / krȃje
- drágo / dragọ̑ → drȃžje
- nízko → nȋžje / nȋže
- ljubeznívo → ljubeznívejše / ljubezníveje
- temnọ̑ → temnȇjše / temnȇje
- kọ́drast → bȍlj kọ́drast
- láhko / lahkọ̑ → lāžje / lāže / lāglje (stylistically marked)
- kásno / kasnọ̑ → kasnȇje / kāšnje (stylistically marked)

=== Accent of nominalized adjectives ===
Nominalized adjectives and adverbs that form a collocation with a preposition (such as od mlȃdega) 'since childhood'(lit. since young) are always circumflex if disyllabic and have accent on the first syllable in definite masculine nominative singular form. When nominalized nouns are a proper noun, then they are also circumflex. Otherwise, they keep accent the same.

== Pronouns ==
Pronouns declined and therefore detailed here can be either nominal or adjectival and follow one of the respective declensions, although many of them are heavily irregular; these are detailed here.

=== Nominal Pronouns ===
Nominal pronouns, apart from personal pronouns are of two types; first are used to refer to people and are masculine gender, and other are used for everything else and are neuter gender. Exception are nominal pronouns which are the same gender as the noun they represent.

==== Personal pronouns ====
Personal pronouns have in some cases up to four forms. The accusative, genitive and dative forms have stressed and unstressed forms; the stressed forms are used when particular emphasis is needed. The accusative also has a form used when preceded by a monosyllabic preposition, skọ̑zi 'through' (which is changed to skọ̑z-), or v 'in' (which is changed into vȃ-) that is combined with the preposition, such as na 'on' + me 'me', which are combined into nȃme 'on me' and v 'in, into' + te 'you', which are combined into vȃte 'into you'. Stressed combining form also exist, however they are considered archaic and do not actually combine with the preposition (for example, na mẹ́ 'on me'). Instead of combining forms, usual stressed forms can also be used.

Different forms are in the table below written as unstressed / stressed / combining / stressed combining. Note that not all pronouns have all expected forms in each case and number.

The first and second person singular pronouns are very irregular, and follow their own declension (second neuter declension). The nominative forms of the dual and plural have different forms for the genders, depending on who is speaking or who is being spoken to. In the case of the dual, the nominative developed from literally "we two" and "you two", although the other cases were inherited from Common Slavic. The combining forms exist only in singular.

The reflexive pronouns are used to refer back to the subject or to some other word, and have only a single set of forms for all three numbers, which inflect like the first- and second-person singular pronouns. There is no nominative form.

	1st person			2nd person			Reflexive		
Singular
	m	f	n	m	f	n	m	f	n
Nominative	jȁz			tȋ			—		
Genitive	méne / me			tébe / te			sébe / se		
Dative	méni / mi			tébi / ti			sébi / si		
Accusative	méne / me / -me / mẹ̑			tébe / te / -te / tẹ̑			sébe / se / -se / sẹ̑		
Locative	méni			tébi			sébi		
Instrumental	menọ́j, mȃno			tebọ́j, tȃbo			sebọ́j, sȃbo		
Vocative	jȁz			tȋ			—		
Possessive	mọ́j	mọ́ja	mọ́je	tvọ́j	tvọ́ja	tvọ́je	svọ́j	svọ́ja	svọ́je
	Dual								
Nominative	mȋdva	mȇdve / mȋdve		vȋdva	vȇdve / vȋdve		—		
Genitive	nȃju / naju			vȃju / vaju			sébe / se		
Dative	nȃma / nama			vȃma / vama			sébi / si		
Accusative	nȃju / naju			vȃju / vaju			sébe / se / -se		
Locative	nȃju			vȃju			sébi		
Instrumental	nȃma			vȃma			sebọ́j, sȃbo		
Vocative	mȋdva	mȇdve / mȋdve		vȋdva	vȇdve / vȋdve		—		
Possessive	nȃjin	nȃjina	nȃjino	vȃjin	vȃjina	vȃjino	svọ́j	svọ́ja	svọ́je
	Plural								
Nominative	mȋ	mẹ̑		vȋ	vẹ̑		—		
Genitive	nȁs / nas			vȁs / vas			sébe / se		
Dative	nȁm / nam			vȁm / vam			sébi / si		
Accusative	nȁs / nas			vȁs / vas			sébe / se / -se		
Locative	nȁs			vȁs			sébi		
Instrumental	nȃmi			vȃmi			sebọ́j, sȃbo		
Vocative	mȋ	mẹ̑		vȋ	vẹ̑		—		
Possessive	nȁš	nȁša	nȁše	vȁš	vȁša	vȁše	svọ́j	svọ́ja	svọ́je

The third-person pronouns inflect similar to the fourth declensions, but irregularly. Like in the first- and second-person pronouns, the accusative is the same as the genitive, and the ending -ih in the dual forms is replaced with -iju. The nominative is formed from a different stem than the other cases. The combining forms in masculine and neuter singular have two different versions, the latter being used when combining with a preposition that does not end with a vowel, which are skozi "through" (skozenj), pred "in from of, before" (predenj), and čez "over, in a certain amount of time" (čezenj).

	Singular			Dual			Plural		
	Masculine	Feminine	Neuter	Masculine	Feminine	Neuter	Masculine	Feminine	Neuter
Nominative	ȍn	óna	óno (arch. onọ̑)	ónadva / onȃdva	ónidve / onẹ̑dve		óni / onȋ	óne / onẹ̑	óna / onȃ
Genitive	njéga / ga	njẹ́ / je	njéga / ga	njȋju, njȉh (arch. njȗ) / ju, jih			njȉh / jih		
Dative	njému / mu	njēj, njȅj, njȉ / ji	njému / mu	njȋma / jima			njȉm / jim		
Accusative	njéga / ga / -nj, -enj [ən']	njọ̄ / jo /njo	njéga / ga / -nj, -enj [ən']	njȋju, njȉh, (arch. njú) / ju / -nju			njȉh, njé / jih / -nje / njẹ́, njȉh		
Locative	njém (coll. njému)	njēj, njȅj, njȉ	njém (coll. njému)	njȋju			njȉh		
Instrumental	njím	njọ́	njím	njȋma			njȋmi		
Vocative	ȍn	ȏna / onȃ	ȏno (arch. onọ̑)	ȏnadva / onȃdva	ȏnidve / onẹ̑dve		ȏni / onȋ	ȏne / onẹ̑	ȏna / onȃ
Possessive	njegóv, njegȍv	njẹ́n	njegóv, njegȍv	njún			njīhov		

===== Use of pronouns as a subject, stressed and undstressed forms =====
The subject in Slovene is often omitted when it consists only of personal pronouns, so use of them as a subject is not so common. As a subject, personal pronouns are used only in the following cases, which are the same as when a stressed form is used instead of the unstressed one:

- To emphasize the subject: Ti mene ne boš učil! 'You won't teach me!'
- If the subject has a grammatical modifier: Tudi jaz ne vem, kaj bi. 'I also don't know what to do."; Jaz, kralj XY, naročam … 'I, the King of XY, am commanding …'
- When implying a difference: Tam je bil on, ne ti. 'He was there, not you.'
- In some coordinate relations: Janez in jaz greva na grad. 'Janez and I are going to see the castle.', but Bil je tam. 'He was there.' and Ne vem, kaj bi. 'I don't know what to do' allow the omission.
- After prepositions (except when combining form is used), stressed versions are used: k tebi '(run, walk, come etc.) to you', za mano 'behind me', zoper nje 'against her', brez vas 'without you (plural)'.

==== Interrogative nominal pronouns ====
The interrogative pronouns kdọ̄ 'who' and kāj 'what' have only singular forms, and have irregular stem changes. kaj also replaces the normal -g- in the genitive with -s-.

Nominative	kdọ̄	kāj
Genitive	kọ̄ga	čẹ̄sa
Dative	kọ̄mu	čẹ̄mu
Accusative	kọ̄ga	kāj
Locative	kọ̄m	čẹ̄m
Instrumental	kọ̄m	čīm
Vocative	kdọ̑	kȃj

==== Relative nominal pronouns ====
The relative pronouns kdọ̑r/kdȍr 'who, that' and kȁr 'which, that' inflect like kdo and kaj, but add -r to the end of each form, adding a fill vowel if necessary. The ending -j is also dropped.

Nominative	kdọ̑r / kdȍr	kȁr	kdọ̑rkọ̑li / kdȍrkọ̑li	kȁrkọ̑li
Genitive	kọ̑gar	čẹ̑sar	kọ̑garkọ̑li	čẹ̑sarkọ̑li
Dative	kọ̑mur	čẹ̑mur	kọ̑murkọ̑li	čẹ̑murkọ̑li
Accusative	kọ̑gar	kȁr	kọ̑garkọ̑li	kȁrkọ̑li
Locative	kọ̑mer	čẹ̑mer	kọ̑merkọ̑li	čẹ̑merkọ̑li
Instrumental	kọ̑mer	čȋmer	kọ̑merkọ̑li	čȋmerkọ̑li
Vocative	kdọ̑r / kdȍr	kȁr	kdọ̑rkọ̑li / kdȍrkọ̑li	kȁrkọ̑li

==== Relative indefinite pronouns ====
Relative indefinite pronouns kdọ̑rkọ̑li/kdȍrkọ̑li 'whoever' and kȁrkọ̑li 'whatever' are declined as kdor and kar, but with a suffix at the end, which can also be a separate word (kdor koli, kar koli).

Nominative	kdọ̑rkọ̑li / kdȍrkọ̑li	kȁrkọ̑li
Genitive	kọ̑garkọ̑li	čẹ̑sarkọ̑li
Dative	kọ̑murkọ̑li	čẹ̑murkọ̑li
Accusative	kọ̑garkọ̑li	kȁrkọ̑li
Locative	kọ̑merkọ̑li	čẹ̑merkọ̑li
Instrumental	kọ̑merkọ̑li	čȋmerkọ̑li
Vocative	kdọ̑rkọ̑li / kdȍrkọ̑li	kȁrkọ̑li

==== Indefinite nominal pronouns ====
The pronouns nekdọ̄/nẹ̑kdo 'somebody' and nẹ̄kaj 'something' follow the declensions of kdo and kaj. Pronoun nekdo can also have a prefix pre-, which is declined the same: prenekdọ̄/prenẹ̑kdo 'quite a few people' prenekọ̄ga.

Nominative	nekdọ̄ / nẹ̑kdo	nẹ̄kaj
Genitive	nekọ̄ga	nečẹ̄sa
Dative	nekọ̄mu	nečẹ̄mu
Accusative	nekọ̄ga	nẹ̄kaj
Locative	nekọ̄m	nečẹ̄m
Instrumental	nekọ̄m	nečīm
Vocative	nekdọ̑	nẹ̑kaj

==== Negative nominal pronouns ====
The pronouns nihčȅ/nȋhče 'nobody' and nȉč 'nothing' follow the declensions of kdor and kar, but the nominative and accusative are different. The pronoun nȋkdo is an archaic version of nihčȅ. The other forms are the same as nihče.

Nominative	nihčȅ / nȋhče	nȉč	nȋkdo
Genitive	nikọ̑gar	ničẹ̑sar	nikọ̑gar
Dative	nikọ̑mur	ničẹ̑mur	nikọ̑mur
Accusative	nikọ̑gar	nȉč	nikọ̑gar
Locative	nikọ̑mer	ničẹ̑mer	nikọ̑mer
Instrumental	nikọ̑mer	ničȋmer	nikọ̑mer

==== Universal nominal pronouns ====
Integral pronoun vsȃkdo 'everyone' follows the declension of kdo, but vse 'everything' is irregular.

Nominative	vsȃkdo	vsȅ
Genitive	vsȃkogar	vsȅga / vsegȁ
Dative	vsȃkomur	vsȅmu / vsemȕ
Accusative	vsȃkogar	vsȅ
Locative	vsȃkomer	vsȅm
Instrumental	vsȃkomer	vsȅm
Vocative	vsȃkdo	vsȅ

==== Manifold nominal pronouns ====
Manifold pronouns are formed by adding a prefix to the interrogative pronouns and are thus declined the same way. The prefix can be mȁrsi- 'quite a few', mnọ̑go- 'many' málo- 'few' or rẹ́dko- 'scarcely'; the last one can combine only with kaj. Prefixes malo and redko can also be written as a separate word (malo kaj, redko kdo).

==== Unspecified nominal pronouns ====
These are kdọ́ 'someone arbitrary' and kȁj 'something arbitrary', which are written and declined the same as interrogative pronouns, but interrogative kaj has a different accent. An example sentence is Vzemi si kaj za jesti. 'Grab something to eat.'. The difference between these pronouns and indefinite pronouns is that one is not obliged to do anything. In the example sentence, the subject is not obliged to grab anything, but in the sentence Vzemi si nekaj za jesti, which would be translated the same, the subject is obliged to grab something.

Nominative	kdọ̄	kȁj
Genitive	kọ̄ga	čẹ̄sa
Dative	kọ̄mu	čẹ̄mu
Accusative	kọ̄ga	kȁj
Locative	kọ̄m	čẹ̄m
Instrumental	kọ̄m	čīm
Vocative	kdọ̑	kȁj

=== Adjectival pronouns ===
Most of the adjectival pronouns are regular and follow first adjective declension. Pronouns that follow second declension are čȋgar, čigȃvər, kọ̑likor, ki, nȉč, and precȇj. Pronoun nobȅn has, the same as ȅn, a different definite nominal singular form when nominalized – nobȅden.

==== Relative unspecified adjectival pronouns and demonstrative pronouns ending in -le ====
These pronouns are built from another pronoun by adding an undeclinable suffix -koli, -sibodi, -le, or -lele (kȃkršenkọ̑li, kȃkršensibọ́di, tákle, tȃlele). In these cases, the pronoun it consists of is declined as usual and the suffix is added at the end. Thus endings turn into infixes. (genitive singular masculine kȃkršnegakọ̑li, kȃkršnegasibọ́di, tákegale, tẹ̑galele). Pronouns ending in -sibodi can also be written in three words and those ending in -koli in two: kakršen si bodi, kakršen koli.

==== ta, ves, and oba ====
The demonstrative tȃ "this" inflects like an adjective, but -i- in the endings is replaced with -e-. Many of the forms have shortened alternatives, including cases of non-final short accents.

	Singular			Dual			Plural		
	Masculine	Feminine	Neuter	Masculine	Feminine	Neuter	Masculine	Feminine	Neuter
Nominative	tȃ	tȃ	tọ̑	tȃ	tȋ		tȋ	tȇ	tȃ
Genitive	tẹ̑ga / tegȁ	tẹ̑	tẹ̑ga / tegȁ	tẹ̑h / tȅh			tẹ̑h / tȅh		
Dative	tẹ̑mu / temȕ	tȇj / tȅj / tȉ	tẹ̑mu / temȕ	tẹ̑ma / tȅma			tẹ̑m / tȅm		
Accusative	nom or gen	tọ̑	tọ̑	tȃ	tȋ		tẹ̑	tẹ̑	tȃ
Locative	tẹ̑m / tȅm	tȇj / tȅj / tȉ	tẹ̑m / tȅm	tẹ̑h / tȅh			tẹ̑h / tȅh		
Instrumental	tẹ̑m / tȅm	tọ̑	tẹ̑m / tȅm	tẹ̑ma / tȅma			tẹ̑mi		
Vocative	tȃ	tȃ	tọ̑	tȃ	tȋ		tȋ	tȇ	tȃ

The word vȅs "all" and inflects much like tȃ, but it inflects as if it were a soft stem, having -e in the neuter nominative/accusative singular. All the accents are short, even those in a non-final syllable, where [ə] is pronounced.

	Singular			Dual			Plural		
	Masculine	Feminine	Neuter	Masculine	Feminine	Neuter	Masculine	Feminine	Neuter
Nominative	vȅs	vsȁ	vsȅ	vsȁ	vsȉ		vsȉ	vsȅ	vsȁ
Genitive	vsȅga / vsegȁ	vsȅ	vsȅga / vsegȁ	vsȅh			vsȅh		
Dative	vsȅmu / vsemȕ	vsȅj / vsȉ	vsȅmu / vsemȕ	vsȅma			vsȅm		
Accusative	nom or gen	vsȍ	vsȅ	vsȁ	vsȉ		vsȅ	vsȅ	vsȁ
Locative	vsȅm	vsȅj / vsȉ	vsȅm	vsȅh			vsȅh		
Instrumental	vsȅm	vsȍ	vsȅm	vsȅma			vsȅmi		
Vocative	vȅs	vsȁ	vsȅ	vsȁ	vsȉ		vsȉ	vsȅ	vsȁ

=== Numerals ===
Numeral ȅn 'one' and its derivatives have a definite form édən in nominative singular when nominalized, but others are the same. Numerals dvȃ 'two' and obȃ have -i- in endings replaced with -e- and numerals tríje 'three' and štírje 'four' have a different ending in nominative and accusative. Numeral tríje also changes the -i- in the ending to -e- in other cases. Other cardinal numerals have a null ending in all genders in nominative, vocative, and accusative (example pẹ̑t 'five'). Numeral stọ̑ (stem stót-) 'hundred' has a different form in nominative, vocative, and accusative, and open-mid vowel in numerals pẹ̑t (stem pét-) 'five', šẹ̑st (stem šést) 'six', sẹ̑dəm (stem sédm-) 'seven', ọ̑sem (stem ósm-) 'eight', devẹ̑t (stem devét-) 'nine', and desẹ̑t (stem desét-) 'ten' is changed to close-mid vowel in nominative. They also change the accent irregularly in nominative and accusative:

	Dual		
	Masculine	Feminine	Neuter
Nominative	obȃ / obȃdva	obẹ̑ / obẹ̑dve	
Genitive	obẹ̄h / obẹ̄h dvẹ̄h (styl.)		
Dative	obẹ̄ma / obẹ̄ma dvẹ̄ma (styl.)		
Accusative	obȃ / obȃdva	obẹ̑ / obẹ̑dve	
Locative	obẹ̄h / obẹ̄h dvẹ̄h (styl.)		
Instrumental	obẹ̄ma / obẹ̄ma dvẹ̄ma (styl.)		
Vocative	obȃ / obȃdva	obẹ̑ / obẹ̑dve	

	Plural		
	Masculine	Feminine	Neuter
Nominative	štírje	štíri	
Genitive	štȋrih		
Dative	štȋrim		
Accusative	štiri	štíri	
Locative	štȋrih		
Instrumental	štȋrimi		
Vocative	štȋrje	štȋri	

	Dual		
	Masculine	Feminine	Neuter
Nominative	dvȃ	dvẹ̑	
Genitive	dvẹ̄h		
Dative	dvẹ̄ma		
Accusative	dvȃ	dvẹ̑	
Locative	dvẹ̄h		
Instrumental	dvẹ̄ma		
Vocative	dvȃ	dvẹ̑	

	Plural		
	Masculine	Feminine	Neuter
Nominative	pẹ̑t	pẹ̑t	
Genitive	pétih		
Dative	pétim		
Accusative	pẹ̑t	pẹ̑t	
Locative	pétih		
Instrumental	pétimi		
Vocative	pẹ̑t	pẹ̑t	

	Plural		
	Masculine	Feminine	Neuter
Nominative	tríje / trijẹ̑	trȋ	
Genitive	trẹ̑h		
Dative	trẹ̑m		
Accusative	trȋ	trȋ	
Locative	trẹ̑h		
Instrumental	trẹ̑mi		
Vocative	trȋje / trijẹ̑	trȋ	

	Plural		
	Masculine	Feminine	Neuter
Nominative	stọ̑	stọ̑	
Genitive	stótih		
Dative	stótim		
Accusative	stọ̑	stọ̑	
Locative	stótih		
Instrumental	stótimi		
Vocative	stọ̑	stọ̑	

Note that this changes occur only when numerals follow first adjective declension. When following second declension, numerals have a nominative form throughout. For more information regarding which declension they follow, see section words that can follow both declensions.

== Dialectal and obsolete declension changes ==
There are many dialectal changes, with the most common being:

- Neuter o-stem alternatively have ending -u in nominative singular.
- Feminine v-stem nouns can decline as a-stems.
- Endings -iga, -imu, -im instead of -ega, -emu, -em.
- Locative singular became the same as dative singular.
- Archaic ending -e in o-stem locative singular is still present in archaic northern Littoral dialects.
- Simplification of irregular nouns into regular.
- Change of non-final vowels in endings to a (e. g. gospodama)

Many different endings can also appear in general colloquial speech:

- Many masculine nouns can either follow n-stem or t-stem declension, especially those following a-stem declension and those ending in -el(j).
- Ending -i instead of -je in nominative plural for masculine o-stems.
- Loss of dual, especially when ending in vowel + m + vowel.

There are also some obsolete styles of declension lost in modern Slovene:

- No distinction between soft and hard stems. (the current differences occurred in 19th century)
- Noun gospod still followed i-stem declension up to 19th century.
- Dative and locative were the same for nominal declensions in 15th century.
- Feminine a-stem had ending either -o or -oj in instrumental singular.
- Comparative and superlative used to be indeclinable.
- Superlative used to be formed with nȁr-.
- Special endings for vocative case.

=== Declension with tone changes ===
In the southeastern part of Brda dialect, the modern vowel reduction was so developed that a new way of declining nouns was developed. Brda dialect lost the original tonal oppositions, but they developed them back in a new way, so more cases can be distinguished:

Masculine o-stem declension
	Singular	Dual	Plural
Nominative	-̑	-̑a	-́
Genitive	-̑a	-̑u	
Dative	-́	-̑em ~ -̑əm	
Accusative	nom or gen	-̑a	-́
Locative	-́	-̑ix	
Instrumental	-̑əm	-̑əm ~ -áːm	
Vocative	-̑	-̑a	-́

Neuter o-stem declension
	Singular	Dual	Plural
Nominative	-̑o	-́	
Genitive	-̑a	-̑	
Dative	-́	-̑em ~ -̑əm	
Accusative	-̑o	-́	
Locative	-́	-̑ix	
Instrumental	-̑əm	-̑əm ~ -áːm	
Vocative	-̑o	-́	

Feminine a-stem declension
	Singular	Dual	Plural
Nominative	-̑a	-́	
Genitive	-́	-̑	
Dative	-́	-̑em	
Accusative	-́	-́	
Locative	-́	-̑ix	
Instrumental	-́	-áːm	
Vocative	-̑a	-́	

A similar thing also happens with i-stem nouns when the ending is -i.
