= Slovene phonology =

Phonology and phonetics of Slovene

This article is about the phonology and phonetics of standard Slovene.

== Consonants ==
Slovene has 24-26 distinctive consonant phonemes; of those, only 21 are more common:

Slovene consonant phonemes
		Labial	Dental/ Alveolar	Palatal	Dorsal
Nasal		m	n		
Plosive	voiceless	p	t		k
Plosive	voiced	b	d		ɡ
Affricate	voiceless	(pf)	ts	tʃ	(kx)
Affricate	voiced		(dz)	dʒ	
Fricative	voiceless	f	s	ʃ	x
Fricative	voiced	(v)	z	ʒ	
Approximant		ʋ	l	j	(w)
Flap			ɾ		

- /m, p, b/ are bilabial, whereas /f, ʋ, pf/ are labiodental.
- /t, d, ts, dz, s, z/ are dental [t̪, d̪, t̪s̪, d̪z̪, s̪, z̪]; i.e., /t, d/ are laminal denti-alveolar, while /ts, dz, s, z/ are dentalized laminal alveolar, pronounced with the blade of the tongue very close to the upper front teeth, with the tip of the tongue resting behind the lower front teeth.
- /n, l, ɾ/ are alveolar. The first two are laminal denti-alveolar [n̪, l̪] before dental consonants. In addition, /n/ is velar [ŋ] before velar consonants, and it merges with /m/ to a labiodental [ɱ] before labiodental consonants.
- It is debatable whether the Slovene ⟨r⟩ should be transcribed as /ɾ/ or /r/. The pronunciation varies between native speakers, but generally they all oppose 'typical' long trill.
- /ɾ/ is uvular in a number of Upper Carniolan and Carinthian dialects, but such pronunciation is not allowed in Standard Slovene.
- /k/ is usually pronounced a bit more aspirated and it becomes fully aspirated /kʰ/ before close vowels.
- /g/ is spirantized into /ɣ/ in a large portion of the Slovene-speaking area (all Littoral dialects, most Rovte dialects, some parts of the Upper Carniolan dialects, the western Carinthian dialects), or even further into /χ, ʁ/ or even disappeared altogether.
- /ɾ/ is usually described as the sequence /əɾ/ (with an epenthetic [ə]). Jones (2002) found that a vocalic segment similar to [ə] occurs before (and occasionally after) both syllabic and non-syllabic /ɾ/, and that it is shorter than epenthetic [ə], leading to the conclusion that this is not epenthetic [ə], but simply a feature of rhotic consonant production in Slovene.
- /pf/, /kx/, /dʒ/ and /dz/ as a phoneme only appear in loanwords, such as pfenig [ˈpféːnìk] 'pfennig', sikh [ˈsîːkx] 'Sikh', džez [ˈdʒɛ̂s] 'jazz' and dzeta [ˈdzéːtà] 'zeta'.

/ʋ/ has several allophones depending on context.

- Before a vowel, the pronunciation is labiodental, [ʋ].
- Before or after a vowel, the pronunciation is bilabial [u̯] and forms a diphthong.
- At the beginning of a syllable, before a consonant (for example in vsi 'all'), the pronunciation varies more widely by speaker and area. Some speakers convert /ʋ/ into a full vowel [u] in this position. For those speakers that retain a consonantal pronunciation, it pre-labializes the following consonant. Thus, vsi may be pronounced as disyllabic [uˈsî] or monosyllabic [ˈʷsî].
- In some dialects /ʋ/ turned into /v/ instead of [u̯]/[w]/[ᵂ] and devoices as a normal obstruent (see consonant changes), so vsi would in those dialects be pronounced [ˈfsî].

The preposition v is always bound to the following word and it is always pronounced as /u̯/ except when standing alone out of a sentence (the pronunciation then is [úː]).

Under certain (somewhat unpredictable) circumstances, historical /l/ at the end of a syllable has become [u̯] (or /w/ after /ɾ/). This change has occurred in the endings of all past participles ending in vowel + l. For many derivatives of words ending in [u̯] that historically had /l/, both [l] and [u̯] can be used, sometimes depending on the context it is being used in.

/p/ and /b/ have different pronunciations before some sonorants:

- Before /m/, pronunciation is nasal, [pⁿ] and [bⁿ], respectively.
- Before /f/ and /ʋ/, pronunciation is labiodental, [p̪] and [b̪], respectively.

Similarly, /t/ and /d/ also change their pronunciations:

- Before /n/, the pronunciation is nasal, [tⁿ] and [dⁿ], respectively.
- Before /l/, they become lateral stops, [tˡ] and [dˡ], respectively.

=== Bigger dialectal variations ===
Slovene has many dialects, which have their own consonant changes. Some of the changes that impact only one consonant are already listed above and more general changes that impact more consonants, as well as two distinctions that are not present in standard language anymore are listed here.

==== Palatal sonorants ====
Alpine Slovene, the transitional language between Proto-Slavic and Slovene, had four (alveolo-)palatal sonorants: j /j/, ľ /lʲ/, ń /nʲ/, and ŕ /ɾʲ/. Sonorants /lʲ/, /nʲ/ and /ɾʲ/ all turned into sequences /lj/, /nj/ and /rj/, respectively if followed by a vowel. Before a consonant, /ɾʲ/ merged with /ɾ/ in all dialects, while /lʲ/ still retains its palatal pronunciation in Upper Savinja, Inner Carniolan, Karst, Soča, Istrian, Upper Carniolan around Bohinj, South White Carniolan, Kostel and southern part of Gail Valley dialects and /nʲ/ retains the pronunciation in Resian, Torre Valley, Natisone Valley, Karst, Inner Carniolan, Istrian, Brda, Soča, Gail Valley, Rosen Valley, Upper Carniolan around Bohinj, Prekmurje, Kostel and South White Carniolan dialects. In other dialects they either merged with their non-palatal counterparts, merged with /j/ or turned into sequences /jl/ and /jn/ (/j̃/). Therefore, Standard Slovene allows three different pronunciations in this case:

- Speakers of dialects which retained original pronunciation usually pronounce them as /lʲ/ and /nʲ/, respectively. Elsewhere, this pronunciation is considered archaic.
- Speakers of dialects which completely lost the distinction between palatal and non-palatal /l/ and /n/ pronounce them the same also in the Standard language.
- Other speakers can pronounce them either as one of the forms above, or as longer /lː/ and /nː/, respectively.

In the orthography, former /lʲ/, /nʲ/ and /ɾʲ/ are always represented by the sequences ⟨lj⟩, ⟨nj⟩ and ⟨rj⟩, respectively, except before a consonant /ɾʲ/ is represented by ⟨r⟩.

==== tʼ–č distinction ====
The tʼ–č distinction is one of the two distinctions that was present in Alpine Slovene and is still present in some dialects, but is not present in the standard language anymore. Dialects that still have this distinction (Resian and Torre Valley dialects, some Soča, Inner Carniolan and Istrian microdialects) mostly do not pronounce the phoneme as /c/ anymore, but as /tɕ/, which was also the standard pronunciation during the Reformation. Therefore, this distinction is either dialectal or obsolete. In other dialects, /c/ merged with /tʃ/. Examples, where the difference can be observed are sveča [ˈsʋèːtɕá] (with distinction) [ˈsʋèːtʃá] (without distinction) 'candle', teči [ˈtɛ̀ːtɕí] (with distinction) [ˈtɛ̀ːtʃí] (without distinction) 'to run (to flow)' and hočem [ˈxòːtɕɛ́m] (with distinction) [ˈxòːtʃɛ́m] (without distinction) '(I) want'.

==== Shvapanye, elkanye, vekanye and *ł ====
In Alpine Slavic, *ł was an allophone of *l before consonants, back vowels and /a/, and before a stop. Some dialects still retain the original pronunciation (e.g., Horjul, Lower Carniolan, Inner Carniolan and Upper Savinja dialects. Shvapanye (Slovene: švapanje) is the pronunciation of /l/ and /ʋ/ as [w] or [u̯] before all back vowels, consonants and /a/ (/ʌ/), which is present in the Carinthian dialects, Upper Carniolan dialect, some northern Lower Carniolan microdialects and the Čabranka dialect. In standard language, shvapanye is only somewhat present, as described above. Elkanye (Slovene: elkanje) and vekanye (Slovene: vekanje) is the hypercorrect way of pronouncing words, without shvapanye.

==== Slekanye ====
Slekanye (Slovene: slekanje) is a phenomenon mostly limited to slovenized Germans, which live in around Rut (Bača subdialect) and is the merge of alveolar and post-alveolar fricatives and affricates into one phoneme, which is pronounced somewhere in between (/t͇s͇/, /s͇/ and /z͇/ for /ts/ and /tʃ/, /s/ and /ʃ/, and /z/ and /ʒ/, respectively). Apart from that area, it is also known for a part of the Torre Valley dialect.

==== tl/dl–t/d distinction ====
Proto-Slavic consonant clusters *tl and *dl simplified quite soon in central, southern and eastern areas while it disappeared later from western and northern dialects. Today, the only dialect that still retains this distinction is the Gail Valley dialect. The clusters tl and dl that are nowadays present in the standard language became such after the omission of *ь/*ъ between the consonants. The distinction can be seen in the word vile [ˈʋìːdlɛ́] (Gail Valley dialect without any other dialectal changes) [ˈʋìːlɛ́] (all other dialects).

=== Consonant changes ===
The pronunciation of a consonant can be influenced by its surroundings, which is not necessarily reflected in the orthography.

==== First Slavic palatalization ====
The first Slavic palatalization in modern Slovene exists only for /k/, /g/, /x/, and /ts/, which turn into /tʃ/, /ʒ/, /ʃ/, and /tʃ/, respectively:

Depalatalized (hard)	Palatalized (soft)
[[:File:Sl-nt-moker.ogg|[ˈmoːkəɾ]]] moker 'wet' (adj)	[[:File:Sl-nt-močiti.ogg|[moˈtʃiːti]]] močiti 'to wet'
[[:File:Sl-nt-dolg.ogg|[ˈdo̞ːu̯k]]] dolg 'long'	[[:File:Sl-nt-dolžina.ogg|[dou̯ˈʒiːna]]] dolžina 'length' (nom)
[[:File:Sl-nt-smeh.ogg|[ˈsmeːx]]] smeh 'laugh' (nom)	[[:File:Sl-nt-smešen.ogg|[ˈsmeːʃən]]] smešen 'funny'
[[:File:Sl-nt-srce.ogg|[səɾˈtseː]]] srce 'heart' (nom)	[[:File:Sl-nt-brezsrčen.ogg|[breˈsːəɾtʃən]]] brezsrčen 'heartless'

==== Second Slavic palatalization ====
The second Slavic palatalization in today's Slovene exists only for /k/ and /g/, which turn into /ts/ and /z/, respectively:

Depalatalized (hard)	Palatalized (soft)
[[:File:Sl-nt-otrok.ogg|[ʔoˈtɾɔk]]] otrok 'child' (nom)	[[:File:Sl-nt-otroci 01.ogg|[ʔoˈtɾɔːtsi]]] otroci 'children' (nom)
[[:File:Sl-nt-ustregel.ogg|[ʔusˈtɾeːgɛu̯]]] ustregel 'satisfy' (l-participle)	[[:File:Sl-nt-ustrezati.ogg|[ʔusˈtɾeːzaˌti]]] ustrezati 'suit'

==== Iotation ====
Iotation is the change of a consonant when /j/ follows and they merge in one or more sounds:

Change	Non-iotated	Iotated
/t/ → /tʃ/	biti	bič
/d/ → /j/	mladiti	mlaj
/s/ → /ʃ/	visok	višavje
/z/ → /ʒ/	nizek	nižavje
/ts/ → /tʃ/	jajce	jajčast
/n/ → /nj/	polniti	polnjen
/l/ → /lj/	voliti	volja
/ɾ/ → /ɾj/	govoriti	govorjen
/p/ → /plj/	kapati	kaplja
/b/ → /blj/	pozabiti	pozabljen
/m/ → /mlj/	lomiti	lomljen
/ʋ/ → /ʋlj/	daviti	davljen
/f/ → /flj/	frfetati	frflja

==== Dissimilation ====
When a stop or affricate is followed by another stop or affricate, it dissimilates into a fricative, e. g. bedak [beˈdǎːk] 'idiot' + -ski [ski] → bedaški [beˈdàːʃkí] 'idiotic' and k [k] 'to' + grobu [ˈgrɔ̀ːbú] 'grave' → h grobu [x‿ˈgɾɔ̀ːbú] 'to the grave'.

==== Assimilation ====
There are two types of assimilation in Slovene; a consonant can either match the following consonant by voice or by the place of articulation (or both).

All voiced obstruents are devoiced at the end of prosodic words unless immediately followed by a word beginning with a vowel or a voiced consonant. In consonant clusters, voicing distinction is neutralized and all consonants assimilate the voicing of the rightmost segment. The consonant pairs are given in this table:

Devoiced	/p/	[p̪]	/t/	/k/	/pf/	/ts/	/tʃ/	/kx/	/f/	/s/	/ʃ/	/x/
Voiced	/b/	[b̪]	/d/	/g/	[bv]	/dz/	/dʒ/	[gɣ]	[v]	/z/	/ʒ/	[ɣ]

In this context, [v] and [ɣ] may occur as voiced allophones of /f/ and /x/, respectively (e.g., vŕh drevésa [ˈʋə̂ɾɣ dɾeˈʋéːsà] 'top of a tree'), while [gɣ] and [bv] would be hardly ever used allophones of /kx/ and /pf/, respectively. Consonant clusters in non-assimilated words can be excluded from this rule, for example podcast [ˈpóːdˌkàst] 'podcast'.

When a dental/alevolar fricative or affricate are followed by a postalveolar fricative, affricate or ⟨nj⟩/⟨lj⟩/⟨rj⟩, they usually become postalveolar; e.g., stric Žan 'uncle, whose name is Žan' [ˈstrîːdzˈʒâːn] or [ˈstrîːdʒˈʒâːn] or [ˈstrîːˈdʒːâːn].

Nasal /m/, /n/ also match the place of articulation with the following consonant: Istanbul 'Istanbul' [ˈíːstamˌbùl], informacija 'information' [ˌiɱfoɾˈmàːtsijà], banka 'bank' [ˈbáːŋkà] (but they do not change articulation before post-alveolar consonants and /m/ also does not have allophone [ŋ]).

==== Gemination of consonants ====
Several consonant clusters also get simplified into geminated consonants. In fast speech, however, they change into usual, non-geminated consonants.

- When two or (rarely) more of the same consonants are pronounced one after another, they become geminated, taking the allophone of the first one; e.g., brezzob 'toothless' [breˈzːôp]. Stops and affricates can be geminated or pronounced separately; e.g., oddati 'to hand in' [odˈdàːtí] or [oˈdːàːtí]. Labialized consonants can also lose labialization after [u̯]; e.g., siv vzorec 'gray pattern' [ˈsîːu̯ˈʷzóːɾə̀ts] or [ˈsîːˈu̯ːzóːɾə̀ts] (of course vzorec can also be acute).
- When a dental/alveolar stop is followed by a dental/alveolar affricate, then they can be pronounced separately or combine into a geminated affricate; e.g., od čebele 'from a bee' [ʔottʃeˈbéːlɛ̀] or [ʔotʃːeˈbéːlɛ̀].
- When a dental/alveolar stop or affricate is followed by a dental/alveolar fricative, they combine into a geminated affricate or are pronounced separately; e.g., podse 'under itself' [ˈpóːtsɛ̀] or [ˈpóːtsːɛ̀].

== Vowels ==
Vowels of Slovene, from Šuštaršič, Komar & Petek (1999:137). /ʌ/ is not shown.

Slovene was long thought to have an eight-vowel system, however newer research (done mostly by Peter Jurgec) suggests that the number of vowels is different between tonal and non-tonal varieties of Slovene which have nine and eleven vowels, respectively.

Slovene vowels

Tonal
	Front	Central	Back
Close	i		u
Close-mid	e	ə	o
Open-mid	ɛ	ə	ɔ
Near-open		ʌ	
Open		a	

Non-tonal
	Front	Central	Back
Close	i		u
Close-mid	e	ə	o
Open-mid	ɛ	ə	ɔ
Open		a	
Consonants	m̩, n̩, l̩		

- Stressed front vowels are in most words pronounced as lax [ɪ] when /r/ follows, so that, e.g., mira 'myrrh' is pronounced [ˈmɪ̀ːɾá] and večer 'evening' is pronounced [ʋɛˈt͡ʃɪ̂ːɾ], but loanwords are exceptions, such as virus [ˈʋíːɾus] and vera [ˈʋɛ́ːɾa].
- If a vowel appears at the beginning of a word, a glottal stop /ʔ/ is inserted before: ura [ˈʔúːɾà] 'clock, watch', rt [ˈʔə̂ɾt] 'cape, headland'.
- Vowels /ɛ/, /ɔ/, /ɪ/ and /a/ (but not /ʌ/) are pronounced with retracted tongue root while others with advanced tongue root.

Jurgec proposes the existence of a ninth vowel /ʌ/ in tonemic variety that in traditional pronunciation (see below under Prosody) would rather be analyzed as a short /a/. However, since more recent studies indicate that native speakers do not actually phonemically distinguish long and short vowels and yet the distinction between /ʌ/ and /a/ is quite consistently perceived by tonal speakers, and moreover there is a noticeable distinction in quality and a lesser distinction in quantity between these two vowels, there is reason to treat these two sounds as two different phonemes.

The near-open /ʌ/ can only appear in the word-final stressed syllable before the syllable coda, as in čas [ˈtʃʌ̂s] 'time'. Due to the restrictions stated above, the open /a/ usually appears in its place in other declinational forms of the same word: časa [ˈtʃàːsá], not [ˈtʃʌ̀ːsá], 'time (gen.)'. The analysis as two different phonemes is also reinforced by the fact that in some words the phoneme /a/ appears in the very same position that would permit /ʌ/, leading to a phonemic contrast: pas [ˈpâs], not [ˈpʌ̂s], 'belt'.

Jurgec also states that in the tonemic varieties of the language, the near-open vowel /ʌ/ can carry only the high tone (see below), which is "parallel to the pattern for the [/ɛ/, /ɔ/ and /ə/]." He also notes that similarly to /ʌ/, the schwa /ə/ likewise only appears in closed syllables; i.e., as the nucleus before the syllable coda. On the basis of these observations he concludes that the near-open vowel /ʌ/ "behaves in a systematic way within the vowel system of Slovenian."

According to Jurgec (2007), /ə/ is inserted epenthetically, and its distribution is fully predictable. He also says that "[d]escriptions of schwa distribution are offer[ed] in lexical rather than grammatical terms. These were also based on historical data and did not consider actual speech of educated speakers in Ljubljana, nowadays considered standard."

Slovene has been traditionally described as distinguishing vowel length, which correlates with stress and is therefore discussed in the prosody section, below. The distinction between /ɛ/ and /e/, and between /ɔ/ and /o/ is only made when they are stressed and long. When short or unstressed, they are not distinguished: short stressed variants are realized as open-mid [ɛ, ɔ], while the unstressed variants are, broadly speaking, true-mid vowels [e̞, o̞]. In fact, however, the unstressed mid vowels have two realizations:

- Lowered close-mid (between close-mid and true-mid) [e̞, o̞] before a stressed syllable (as in velikan 'giant' and oglas 'advertisement').
- Raised open-mid (between true-mid and open-mid) [ɛ̝, ɔ̝] after a stressed syllable (as in medved 'bear' and potok 'stream').

The unstressed mid vowels are never as close as the stressed close-mid vowels /e, o/ and never as open as the stressed open-mid vowels /ɛ, ɔ/. However, Šuštaršič, Komar & Petek (1999) report true-mid allophones [e̞, o̞] of the close-mid vowels /e, o/ occurring in the sequences /ej/ and /ou̯/, but only if a vowel does not follow within the same word. One could therefore argue that the unstressed mid vowels are simply allophones of the close-mid vowels, whereas the open-mid vowels do not occur in unstressed positions. Another argument for transcribing the unstressed mid vowels as /e, o/ is that these symbols are easier to write than /ɛ, ɔ/. These allophones have neither advanced nor retracted tongue root.

In most cases, unstressed vowels are nowadays written as /e, o/ before the stress and as /ɛ, ɔ/ after the stress; however, an older way of writing them as /ɛ, ɔ/ everywhere is still very common (e.g. in Toporišič 2001).

In some loanwords, sonorant clusters may be present that are required to form a new syllable in Slovene. Tonal speakers insert [ə], the same way as happens with sonorant + non-sonorant clusters, but non-tonal speakers form a syllabic consonant, except if the second sonorant is [ɾ]; then [ə] is inserted in both varieties: film [ˈfìːlə́m] (tonal speakers) [ˈfiːlm̩] (non-tonal speakers) 'film, movie'.

When unstressed /ə, i, e/ are followed by [u̯], they can be pronounced together as [u].

In non-assimilated loanwords, German /yː/, /øː/, /œ/, /ʏ/ are also allowed (e.g., [ˈmýːnxə̀n] 'Munich', [ˈgǿːtɛ̀] 'Goethe', [ˈkœ̂ln] 'Cologne', [ˈɾaːʋənsˈbrʏ̂k] 'Ravensbrück'). When the word becomes assimilated or any affixes are added, they become vernacularized. The pronunciation, however, varies widely between speakers depending on their knowledge of German. Here, the phonemes are given for a really educated person and the first change to go in pronunciation of /ʏ/ qualitatively different that /yː/.

In the colloquial spoken language, unstressed and most short stressed vowels tend to be reduced or elided. For example, kȕp ('heap') > [kə̂p], právimo ('we say') > [ˈpɾâu̯mó].

=== Syllable breaks ===
Standard Slovene does not really have diphthongs. The closest to a diphthong are combinations of vowel + [u̯] or [j]. In all other cases, two following vowels form two different syllables, e. g. poenostaviti 'simplify' [po.ˌenoˈstàːʋiˌtí]. Often, these clusters simplify into one vowel (which is reflected in the orthography) or insert [j] (always after /i/, which is not necessarily reflected in the orthography) or [ʔ]. When two vowels are pronounced one after another, they are usually pronounced as would be expected. Exceptions are unstressed /i/ and /u̯/, which are pronounced as usual or turn into [j] and [u̯], respectively if preceded by a vowel, e.g., bo imela '(she) will have' [bo‿iˈméːlà] or [bo‿jˈméːlà].

=== Dialectal variation ===
Number of vowels varies drastically between dialects. For example, Tolmin dialect has 3 long vowels, while some Carinthian microdialects can have 15 or even more long vowels. Alpine Slavic had three distinct long e-like vowels (which are in standard language all represented by /eː/) and two distinct long o-like vowels (which are in standard language all represented by /oː/. However, most dialects at least differentiate between one e-like vowel and the other two. In fact, Standard Slovene has one of the most simplified vowel systems of all dialects. Also not common for other dialects is that it does not contain any diphthongs as they all monophthongized. The only vowels that consistently merged with other vowels is *ə̄, which turned into /aː/ in the west and south (and in standard language) and to /eː/ in the north and east.

While long vowels tend to be diphthongized, short vowels tend to be reduced because of modern vowel reduction, which is also common in colloquial spoken language. Apart from centralization, /e/ is commonly pronounced as /a/ (akanye) or as /i/ (ikanye) and /o/ is commonly pronounced as /a/ (akanye) or /u/ (ukanye).

The most common pronunciation difference between speakers is /e/ vs. /ɛ/ and /o/ vs. /ɔ/ as the dialectal distribution is inconsistent with the distribution in Standard Slovene. This influences the way speakers of such dialects speak Standard Slovene.

A new change that is currently happening most notably around Ljubljana is the pronunciation of /ə/ as [ɛ] or [e], eliminating another distinction between vowels.

==== [ˈsɛm] vs. [ˈsəm] ====
Historically, [ˈsɛm] is the pronunciation of sem in the meaning 'here' and [ˈsəm] for sem in the meaning '(I) am', but due to modern vowel reduction, which is the most prominent in monosyllabic words, and the recent development of /ə/ → /ɛ/ , the roles are nowadays mostly switched, i. e. '(I) am' is now pronounced [ˈsɛm] and 'here' is now pronounced [ˈsəm].

== Prosody ==
Slovene has free stress: stress can occur on any syllable and is not predictable. The same word can be stressed quite differently in different dialects. Most words have a single syllable that carries stress. Some compounds, but not all, have multiple stressed syllables, inherited from the parts that make up the compound. There are also a few small words and clitics, including prepositions, that have no inherent stress at all and attach prosodically to another word.

=== Vowel length ===
Slovene is traditionally analysed as having a distinction between long and short vowels. Stress and vowel length are closely intertwined:

- A non-final syllable that bears stress will automatically have a long vowel. Conversely, at most one vowel in a Slovene word is long, and it automatically bears the stress.
- If a word has no long vowels, the stress usually falls on the final syllable. However, a limited number of words have non-final stress on short syllables.
- Schwa /ə/ can also be stressed non-finally, but has no length distinctions.

Vowel length carries a low functional load: it is distinctive only in stressed final syllables, which can be either long or short. In other syllables, however, whether vowel length or stress, or both, are phonemic depends on the underlying phonological analysis. Generally speaking, stress and length co-occur in all but the final syllable, so one feature or the other is phonetically redundant in those words.

Recently, scholars have found that vowel length in standard Slovene is no longer distinctive, and that the only differences in vowel length are that the stressed vowels are longer than the unstressed ones, and that stressed open syllables are longer than stressed closed syllables. Stressed syllables are characterized by amplitude and pitch prominence.

=== Accent shifts ===
Standard Slovene has undergone two accent shifts since Alpine Slovene. The first one, which happened in the 15th century, is from open short final syllables to the mid-close syllable before in words with two syllables, e. g. žena 'wife' [ʒeˈnâ] → [ˈʒɛ̀ːná]. The original accentuation is retained in a part of Rosen Valley, Resian, Natisone Valley, Torre Valley and southern part of Soča dialects and is considered obsolete in Standard Slovene.

The second accent shift was from short final syllable to the mid vowel /ə/ in the syllable before, e. g. megla 'fog' [məˈglâ] → [ˈmə̀glá] (→ [ˈmɛ̀glá]). This change did not happen in all the aforementioned dialects, as well as Upper and Lower Carniolan dialects. Standard language allows both accents, but the unshifted one is considered archaic or high literary, as with the pronunciation of /ə/ as [ɛ] or [e], the shift occurs also in Upper and Lower Carniolan dialects.

Other two common accent shifts, that are not present in Standard Slovene are from all short final ([ʋiˈsɔ̂k] → [ˈʋìːsɔ́k]) and from all long circumflex final ([seˈnôː] → [ˈsèːnɔ́]). The first one happened in Tolmin, Cerkno, Črni Vrh, Horjul, Karst, Inner Carniolan, Istrian, Kostel, Čabranka, South White Carniolan and North White Carniolan dialects, as well as all Styrian dialects, except Lower Sava Valley dialect and the second one happened in Gail Valley dialect without the subdialect, Resian, Torre Valley, Črni Vrh, Poljane, eastern part of Rosen Valley, Jaun, Mežica, North Pohorje–Remšnik, Upper Savinja, Central Savinja, South Pohorje, Kostel, Čabranka, North White Carniolan and South White Carniolan dialects.

=== Tone ===
The standard language has two varieties, tonemic and non-tonemic. Tonemic varieties distinguish between two tones or pitch contours on stressed syllables, while non-tonemic varieties do not make this distinction. The tonemic varieties are found in a north–south band in the center of the country (Gail Valley, Rosen Valley, Ebriach, most of Jaun Valley, Natisone Valley, Torre Valley, Soča, a lesser part of Tolmin, Upper Carniolan without the subdialect, most of Selca, Horjul, Poljane, and Lower Carniolan dialects, a well as southwestern part of South White Carniolan dialect). Dialects in the eastern and south-western part of Slovenia are non-tonemic. However, because the Slovenian capital city Ljubljana is located within the central tonemic dialect area, phonemic tone was included in the standard language, and in fact the tonemic variety is more prestigious and is universally used in formal TV and radio broadcasts.

The two tones are:

- A low-pitch contour, also known as "acute". It is indicated with an acute diacritic ⟨é⟩ on long syllables, a grave ⟨è⟩ on short syllables.
- A high-pitch contour, also known as "circumflex". It is indicated with an inverted breve diacritic ⟨ȇ⟩ on long syllables, a double grave ⟨ȅ⟩ on short syllables.

The exact distribution and phonetic realization of tonemes varies locally. In Standard Slovene, some words may have either an acute or circumflex tone, with the chosen tone differing by speaker. Unless otherwise noted, this article discusses the tonemes as they are realized in Standard Slovene spoken in Ljubljana.

Tone is differentiated only on the stressed and on the last syllables, where it is the opposite of the tone that stressed syllable has (except in some prepositions). If last syllable is stressed, then they merge and form rising (acute) or falling (circumflex) tone; e.g., pot [ˈpǒːt] / [ˈpôːt] 'path'. Other vowels have neutral (mid) tone. Vowels are mid tone in none-tonemic varieties.

Not all types of syllables have a distinction between the two tones:

- All long vowels distinguish the two tones.
- Tautosyllabic stressed /əɾ/ (i.e., /əɾ/ not directly followed by a vowel in the same word) can also distinguish the two tones. It is considered "long" for this purpose, for example pȓstnica ('phalanx') with high/falling tone vs. pŕstanəc ('finger') with low/rising tone.
- For the schwa /ə/ (when not part of the /əɾ/ combination), the two tones are mostly in complementary distribution: it is circumflex in final syllables and acute elsewhere. This is the only case where a stressed short acute vowel can occur.
- All other stressed short vowels are always realised with a circumflex tone. They are mostly restricted to final syllables.

This leads to the following possible combinations of tone, length and vowel quality (note that unstressed vowels have diacritical marks often omitted):

IPA
	a	ɛ	e̞	e	i	ɔ	o̞	o	u	əɾ	əl	ə
Long low tone	àː	ɛ̀ː	è̞ː	èː	ìː	ɔ̀ː	ò̞ː	òː	ùː	ə̀ɾ	ə̀l	
Long high tone	áː	ɛ́ː	é̞ː	éː	íː	ɔ́ː	ó̞ː	óː	úː	ə́ɾ	ə́l	
Long falling tone	âː		ê̞ː	êː	îː		ô̞ː	ôː	ûː	ə̂r		
Long rising tone	ǎː		ě̞ː	ěː	ǐː		ǒ̞ː	ǒː	ǔː			
Short low tone	à	ɛ̀	è̞		ì	ɔ̀	ò̞		ù			ə̀
Short high tone	á	ɛ́	é̞		í	ɔ́	ó̞		ú			ə́
Short falling tone	â	ɛ̂	ê̞		î	ɔ̂	ô̞		û			ə̂
Mid tone	a	ɛ	e̞		i	ɔ	o̞		u	əɾ	əl	ə

tonemic diacritics
	a	e	ḙ	ẹ	i	o	o̭	ọ	u	r	l	ə
Long low tone	á	é	ḙ́	ẹ́	í	ó	ó̭	ọ́	ú	ŕ	ĺ	
Long high tone	ȃ	ȇ	ḙ̑	ẹ̑	ȋ	ȏ	ȏ̭	ọ̑	ȗ	ȓ	l̑	
Long falling tone	ȃ		ḙ̑	ẹ̑	ȋ		ȏ̭	ọ̑	ȗ	ȓ		
Long rising tone	á		ḙ́	ẹ́	í		ó̭	ọ́	ú			
Short low tone	à	è	ḙ̀		ì	ò	ò̭		ù			ə̀
Short high tone	ȁ	ȅ	ḙ̏		ȉ	ȍ	ȍ̭		ȕ			ə̏
Short falling tone	ȁ	ȅ	ḙ̏		ȉ	ȍ	ȍ̭		ȕ			ə̏
Mid tone	a	e	ḙ		i	o	o̭		u	r	l	ə

The non-tonemic system is identical to the tonemic system above in terms of vowel length and stress, but lacks any phonemic tone. This means that, for those dialects, the first four rows merge, as do the next three. Similarly, for speakers who do not distinguish short and long vowels, the first and third rows merge, as do the second and fourth. An exception to this is the traditional /á/, which does not merge with /áː/. Instead, the former is realized as [ʌ́].

=== Secondary stress ===
Longer words, particularly loanwords, also have secondary stress. It always appears in words and word clusters when words do not have primary stress. Secondary stressed is usually every second syllable before and after the syllable with primary stress; e.g., aerofotogrametrija [ʔaˈɛ́ːrɔˌfotoˌgɾameˈtríːjà] 'aerophotogrammetry'. Secondarily stressed open-mid vowels also become close-mid.

=== Sample ===
The sample text is a reading of the first sentence of The North Wind and the Sun.

==== Phonetic transcription ====
[ˈsèːʋɛrní ˈʋéːtə̀r ʔin ˈsóːntsɛ̀ sta ˌse pɾeˈpɪ̀ːralá – kaˈtɪ̀ːrí ʔod ˈnjìːjú ˌje motʃˈnèːjʃí – ˌko je ˈmìːmɔ́ priˈʃə̂u̯ poˈpòːtník – zaˈʋǐːt ˈʷtɔ̀ːpə́u̯ ˈplǎːʃtʃ]

==== Orthographic version ====
Severni veter in sonce sta se prepirala, kateri od njiju je močnejši, ko je mimo prišel popotnik, zavit v topel plašč.
