= Slovene national phonetic transcription =

Phonetic alphabets describing Slovene

Slovene national phonetic transcription Slovene national transcription
- Script type: Alphabet
- Creator: Fran Ramovš
- Period: 1937–present
- Languages: Slovene language and its dialects, Alpine Slavic

Related scripts
- Parent systems: Egyptian hieroglyphs: Proto-Sinaitic alphabet; Phoenician alphabet; Greek alphabet; Old Italic scripts; Latin alphabet; Czech alphabet; Gaj's Latin alphabet; Slovene alphabet; Slovene national phonetic transcription
- Child systems: Ramovš transcription; Logar transcription; Slovene tonal transcription; Slovene non-tonal transcription; Slovene alphabet with stress notation

Unicode
- Unicode range: Most of the letters are encoded in Latin (Basic Latin, Latin-1 Supplement, Latin Extended-A, Latin Extended-B, Latin Extended-D, Latin Extended Additional, IPA Extensions, Phonetic Extensions, Phonetic Extensions Supplement), most of the others are in Superscripts and Subscripts block or can be made by adding diacritical marks from Combining Diacritical Marks block. There is a letter and its superscript form, and a diacritical mark that are not yet encoded.

Slovene national phonetic transcription (Slovene: Nacionalna fonetična transkripcija [nat͡siɔˈnáːlna fɔˈnèːtit͡ʃna tɾansˈkɾìːpt͡sija]) is a group of four closely related and similar phonetic alphabets used to write pronunciations of Slovene and its dialects, as well as Alpine Slavic. The alphabet was first used by Fran Ramovš in 1937 to transcribe Freising manuscripts, and was later slightly changed to more closely resemble the International Phonetic Alphabet. The old transcription is called "Ramovš transcription" and the new one "the new Slovene national phonetic transcription" or "Logar transcription". From those transcriptions, "tonal transcription" (used for tonal orthography) and "non-tonal transcription" (used for non-tonal orthography), which also has a simplified form that can be implemented without changing the spelling of most of the words and only shows the accent ("Stress notation") were derived, although the ununified predecessors were already used before.

In dialectology, it is known as "national transcription" (Slovene: nacionalna transkripcija), since it is the only appropriate way to write dialects.

== Non-tonal and tonal transcription ==
Whether formal Slovene is a tonal language or not is still debated; however, non-tonal transcription is used more frequently than the tonal one. It can be used to fully transcribe a word, but its diacritical marks can be added to a normally-written word to only denote the stress and the length of the vowel, because the pronunciation of other letters can already be evident from the spelling of most words. However, this cannot be applied to loanwords or to words that already have diacritical marks. This transcription is commonly added to words in books that are pronounced differently, but written the same to differentiate between them, such as môra "a nightmare" and móra "(he) has to". Additionally, mid central vowel can also be written with ə and when l is pronounced as [u̯], it can be represented with ł, however such representation is mostly reserved for dictionaries and study books meant for non-native speakers.

Tonal transcription differs from non-tonal only in diacritical marks.

Long stressed vowels
In a word	Non-tonal	Tonal	IPA
í	í	í	ìː
í	í	ȋ	íː
é	é	ẹ́	èː
é	é	ẹ̑	éː
ê / é	ḙ̄	ḙ́	ɛ̝̀ː
ê / é	ḙ̄	ḙ̑	ɛ̝́ː
ê	ê	é	ɛ̀ː
ê	ê	ȇ	ɛ́ː
á	á	á	àː
á	á	ȃ	áː
ô	ô	ó	ɔ̀ː
ô	ô	ȏ	ɔ́ː
ô / ó	ō̭	ó̭	ɔ̝̀ː
ô / ó	ō̭	ȏ̭	ɔ̝́ː
ó	ó	ọ́	òː
ó	ó	ọ̑	óː
ú	ú	ú	ùː
ú	ú	ȗ	úː

Short stressed vowels
In a word	Non-tonal	Tonal	IPA
ì	ì	ȉ	í
è	ḙ	ḙ̏	ɛ̝́
è	è	ȅ	ɛ́
è / ə̀	ə̀	ə̀	ə̀
è / ə̀	ə̀	ə̏	ə́
à / ʌ̀	à / ʌ̀	ȁ / ʌ̏	á
ò	ò	ȍ	ɔ́
ò	o̭	ȍ̭	ɔ̝́
ù	ù	ȕ	ú
ŕ / r̀	ə̀r	ə̀r	ə̀ɾ
ŕ / r̀	ə̀r	ə̏r	ə́ɾ
ĺ	ə̀l	ə̏l	ə́l

Short unstressed vowels
In a word	Non-tonal	Tonal	IPA
i	i	i	i
e	ḙ	ḙ	ɛ̝
e	e	e	ɛ
e / ə	ə	ə	ə
a	a	a	a
o	o	o	ɔ
o	o̭	o̭	ɔ̝
u	u	u	u
r	ər	ər	əɾ
n	ən	ən	ən
m	əm	əm	əm

Semivowels
In a word	Non-tonal	Tonal	IPA
j	j	j	j
v / u / l / ł	u̯	u̯	w / u̯

Consonants
SNPT	IPA	SNPT	IPA
m	m	t	t̪
n	ɱ	T	t̪ⁿ
n	n̪	ᵗ	t̪ˡ
n’	n̪ʲ	d	d̪
ŋ	ŋ	D	d̪ⁿ
l	l	ᵈ	d̪ˡ
l’	lʲ	k	k
r	ɾ / r	g	g
j	j	č	t͡ʃ
v	ʋ	dž	d͡ʒ
v	v	s	s
w	w	z	z
ʍ	ʍ	š	ʃ
p	p	ž	ʒ
P	pⁿ	c	t͡s
ᴘ	p̪	dz	d͡z
b	b	f	f
ʙ	b̪	h	x
B	bⁿ	ɣ	ɣ

Notes:

- ḙ̄ and ō̭ are in a word usually marked with ^, but few dictionaries mark them with acute accent.
- ʌ̀ is preferred to à if following the Jurgec vowel system.
- An acute accent is placed on r in a word if it is followed by a consonant that is in the same morpheme.
- ĺ is only present in Vltava.
- u̯ is in a word written with u only in some old Slavic words, such as nauk "moral" and is usually transcribed into IPA as [w], but the distinction between the semivowel and consonant is then lost, so u̯ʷ, or simply u̯ is favored.
- On computers, ɱ can be used to represent.

Diacritical marks (non-tonal)
Mark	Position	Use
`	above	Denotes short vowel; it also denotes an open-mid or a mid vowel when combined with e and o.
´	above	Denotes long vowel; it also denotes a close-mid vowel when combined with e and o. Exception is when combined with r or l (see above)
^	above	Denotes long open-mid vowel.
^	below	Denotes mid vowel and can only be combined with e and o.
¯	above	Denotes long vowel and can only be combined with ḙ and o̭. Can also be present on consonants.

Diacritical marks (tonal)
Mark	Position	Use
`	above	Denotes short vowel and low pitch. It is only combined with ə.
̏	above	Denotes short vowel and high pitch.
´	above	Denotes long vowel and low pitch.
̑	above	Denotes long vowel and high pitch.
¯	above	Denotes that both pitches are allowed. It is usually reserved only for long vowels. Can also be present on consonants.
̣	below	It denotes a close-mid vowel.
^	below	It denotes a mid vowel.

The different letters for nasal and lateral stops were only added later and are only rarely used (the usual p, b, t, and d are used).

== Logar and Ramovš transcription ==
The Logar transcription is the full new national phonetic transcription and the Ramovš transcription is the "old" one, both of which can also be used for all Slovene dialects and Alpine Slavic. Logar transcription was designed by Valentin Logar and used in his works. It was implemented mainly because Ramovš transcription was not standardized and to make national transcription more similar to the International Phonetic Alphabet. However, it failed to do that and both transcriptions are in use today.

The transcriptions used for written Slovene are a simplification of these two transcriptions; the letters stayed the same, apart from those added later, and the diacritical marks mimicked the ones from Ramovš transcription, but some were also changed and added.

The transcriptions really detail some sounds, and is therefore more appropriate to use for Slovene dialects than IPA and does not have a perfect IPA substitute for every letter.

Logar and Ramovš transcriptions

Vowels
RT	LT	IPA	Description	Example (Logar transcription)
i		i	Close front unrounded vowel	zíːma (Upper Carniolan)
ü	ü*	y	Close front labialized (rounded) vowel	klǜːč (South White Carniolan)
ü	ü*	ʏ͉	Hollow, velar, rounded, non-tense vowel between ü and y	sǜːn (Upper Carniolan – Kropa)
y		i̠	Close near-front unrounded vowel	ˈbyːri̯e (Inner Carniolan)
u		u	Close back rounded vowel	klúːč (Upper Carniolan)
u̇	u̇*	y̠͈	Close tense near-front rounded vowel	glu̇̀ːh (Lower Carniolan)
i̧		ɪ̟͉	Near-close non-tense front unrounded vowel	lì̧ːce (Eastern Lower Carniolan subdialect)
ɨ		ɪ	Near-close near-front unrounded vowel	žɨ́ːla (Upper Carniolan)
ı̣	i̥	i͈	Close tense i	ˈmåti̥ (Prekmurje)
i̥	i̥	ɨ̟̞	Reduced i-like vowel	na smˈriːet’i̥ (Rižana subdialect)
y̥	y̥*	ɨ̞	Reduced y-like vowel	mỳ̥ti (Karst)
u̥		ʉ̠̞	Reduced u-like vowel	tˈraːbu̥x (South Pohorje)
u̧		ʊ̠͉	Near-close non-tense back rounded vowel	nu̧ːxt (Eastern Lower Carniolan subdialect)
ů	ů*	ʊ̠̝͈	Almost-close tense o	ˈrȩbrů (Prekmurje)
ė		ɪ̟͈	Near-close tense front unrounded vowel	bˈrėːza (Upper Savinja)
ȯ		ʊ̠͈	Near-close tense back rounded vowel	ˈxȯːd’im (Upper Savinja)
ẹ		e	Close-mid front unrounded vowel	pẹ̀ːst (Upper Carniolan)
ë*	ë	e̠	Close-mid near-front unrounded vowel	nə strẹ́šë̀ (Gail Valley)
ọ		o	Close-mid back rounded vowel	kọ́ːža (Upper Carniolan)
ḙ		e̞	Mid front unrounded vowel	zˈvḙːzda (Inner Carniolan)
e̥		ɘ̞	Reduced e-like vowel	na bˈreɣe̥ (Inner Carniolan)
o̥		ɵ̞	Reduced o-like vowel	ˈło̥xt (Inner Carniolan)
o̭		o̞	Mid back rounded vowel	nó̭ːgà (Kranjska Gora subdialect)
ȩ	e / ɛ	ɛ	Open-mid front unrounded vowel	téːta (Upper Carniolan)
ě		ɛː	Yat (long open front vowel) that was present in Alpine Slavic	
ö		ø	Open- and close-mid front rounded vowel	zˈbödy (Inner Carniolan)
ö		œ	Open- and close-mid front rounded vowel	zˈbödy (Inner Carniolan)
ə		ə̞	Open-mid central vowel	ˈpəs (Upper Carniolan)
ə̣	ə̣*	ə̟?	Further reduction of i̥ and e̥	də̣klè (Lower Carniolan)
o̧	o / ɔ	ɔ	Open-mid back rounded vowel	kóːsa (Upper Carniolan)
ä		æ	Near-open front unrounded vowel	tä́ːta (South White Carniolan)
ḁ̈	ḁ̈*	æ̠?	Reduced ä	ˈsọ̀ːlzḁ̈ (Resian)
ḁ	ḁ*	ɐ	Reduced a-like vowel	kḁˈlḙnȯ (Karst)
å		ɒ̝	Near-open back rounded vowel	ˈžåːba (South Pohorje)
ḁ̊	ḁ̊*	ɒ̟̝?	Reduced å	ˈžilḁ̊ (some speakers)
ȧ		a̝	(not fully) Open front unrounded vowel	ˈtȧːta (Inner Carniolan)
a		ä	Open mid unrounded vowel	tráːva (Upper Carniolan)
ã	ą	ã	Nasal a	pą́ːta (Jaun Valley)
õ	ǫ	ɔ̃	Nasal o	qǫ̀ːt (Jaun Valley)
ọ̃	ǫ̣	õ	Nasal ọ	zǫ̣̀ːf (Jaun Valley)
ȯ̃*	ǫ̇	ʊ̠͈̃	Nasal ȯ	pǫ̇̀ːpi (Jaun Valley; rarely)
i̤		ɨ̤	Breathy i	ˈi̤ša (Resian)
ṳ		ʉ̤	Breathy u	ˈrṳška (Resian)
e̤		ɛ̤̈	Breathy e	ko̤ˈle̤no̤ (Resian)
o̤		œ̤̈	Breathy o	ˈo̤ko̤ (Resian)
o̤		ɵ̤	Breathy o	ˈo̤ko̤ (Resian)
ə̤	ə̤*	ə̤	Breathy ə	ˈo̤čə̤ (Resian; rarely)

Sonorants and semivowels
RT	LT	IPA	Description	Example (Logar transcription)
w		w	Bilabial approximant	ɣoˈwọːry (Inner Carniolan)
u̯		u̯ʷ	Semivowel w	pepẹ̀ːu̯ (Upper Carniolan)
m		m	Bilabial nasal	mẹ́ːlem (Upper Carniolan)
v		ʋ	Labiodental approximant	čevọ̀ː (Upper Carniolan)
v’		ʋʲ	Palatalized v	pˈraːv’im (Upper Savinja)
m’*	m’	mʲ	Palatalized m	ˈłuọːm’əm (Upper Savinja)
l		l	Alveolar continued lateral approximant	lìːst (Upper Carniolan)
l̯	l̠	l̪	Dental continued lateral approximant	l̠ìːce (Haloze)
r		ɾ	Alveolar discontinued approximant	rẹ́ːpa (Upper Carniolan)
n		n̪	Dental nasal	ˈnoːu̯s (Central Styrian)
l’		lʲ	Palatalized l	ˈl’uːdi (South White Carniolan)
n’		nʲ	Palatalized dental nasal	ˈtiln’ėk (Upper Savinja)
ĺ		ʎ	Palatal lateral approximant	ˈiːxtĺu (Karst)
ń		ɲ	Palatal nasal	ńìːwa (Brda)
j		j	Palatal approximant	jéːčmen (Upper Carniolan)
i̯		i̯	Semivowel j	ˈzaːi̯ka (North White Carniolan)
j̃*	j̃ / j̨	j̃	Nasalized j	lọ̑ˈbåːj̃a (Slovene Hills)
ĩ̯		ĩ̯	Nasalized ĩ̯	cúĩ̯a (Horjul)
ł		ʟ	Velar l	ˈłȧːi̯tu (Inner Carniola)
ṙ	ṙ / ʀ	ʀ	Uvular r	ˈṙuːəx (Rosen Valley)
ŋ		ŋ	Velar n	lẹ́ːšəŋk (Upper Carniolan)

Non-sonorants
RT	LT	IPA	Example (Logar transcription)	Further details
p		p	xˈlaːpc (Karst)	
b		b	bràːda (Prekmurje)	
ɸ*	ɸ	ɸ	zó:ɸ (Upper Carniola)	
b’		bʲ	ˈdi̯eːb’o (Upper Savinja)	Palatalized b
ƀ		b͉	ƀóːƀəca (Jaun Valley)	Spirantized b
f		f	ˈfant (Lower Carniola)	
θ*	θ	θ̪͆	hù:əθ (Jaun Valley)	
ð	ð*	ð̪͆	'smərðu (some speakers)	
đ		d̻͉̄	brǻːđə (Jaun Valley)	Spirantized d
t		t̻̄	ˈteːme (Prekmurje)	
t’		t̻̄ʲ	ot’áː (Torre Valley)	Palatalized t
d		d̻̄	dẹ̀ːdej (Jaun Valley)	
d’		d̻̄ʲ	rˈd’aːvẹ (Prekmurje)	Palatalized d
c		t̪̻͡s̪̻	sərˈciə (Karst)	Dentalized [t͡s]
c’		t̪̻͡s̪̻ʲ	òšpic’ȧ (Upper Savinja)	Palatalized c
ʒ		d̪̻͡z̪̻	ʒìo (Natisone Valley)	Dentalized [d͡z]
s		s̪̻	làːs (Selca)	Dentalized [s]
s’		s̪̻ʲ	ˈpars’ė (Upper Savinja)	Palatalized s
z		z̪̻	kəˈzaːu̯c (Rižana subdialect)	Dentalized [z]
z’		z̪̻ʲ	jèz’ik (Upper Savinja)	Palatalized z
c̣	c̣ / ċ	t͇͡s͇	ˈċala (Bača subdialect)	Between c and č
ṣ	ṣ / ṡ	s͇	pˈlẹːṡa (Bača subdialect)	Between s and š
ẓ	ẓ / ż	z͇	miˈżinċ (Bača subdialect)	Between z and ž
t́		c?	laˈt́ẹːt (Prekmurje)	Palatal t
d́*	d́	ɟ?	ˈd́ẹːtra (Prekmurje)	Palatal d
ć		t͡ɕ	ˈmaːćexa (Inner Carniolan)	Palatal c
ʒ́		d͡ʑ	ʒ́enitọ̀ːrji (Torre Valley)	Palatal ʒ
ś		ɕ	ˈśux (Torre Valley)	Palatal s
ź		ʑ	śòːu̯źa (Torre Valley)	Palatal z
č		t͡ʃ	ˈməːrlič (Karst)	
č’*	č’	t͡ʃʲ	plỳč’ȧ (some speakers)	Palatalized č
ǯ		d͡ʒ	ǯíːnar (Torre Valley)	
ǯ’*	ǯ’	d͡ʒʲ	påːžǯ’e (Prekmurje; rarely)	Palatalized ǯ
š		ʃ	ˈkaːšiĺ (Karst)	
ž		ʒ	žaˈna (Rosen Valley)	
č́		t͡ɕ / t͡ʃʲ?	č́elìːən (Torre Valley)	Palatal č
ǯ́ / dž́	ǯ́	d͡ʑ / d͡zʲ?	riˈǯ́ȧːve (some speakers)	Palatal ǯ
š́		ɕ / ʃʲ?	táːš́č́a (Torre Valley)	Palatal š
ž́		ʑ / ʒʲ?	jəˈž́ək (Prekmurje)	Palatal ž
k		k	pr̥ˈgiːška (Prekmurje)	
k’		kʲ	vèk’e (Upper Savinja)	Palatalized k
g		g	gùːx (Upper Carniola)	
g’		gʲ	ˈg’ẹːi̯tra (some speakers)	Palatalized g
x		x	xàːti (Rosen Valley)	
x’		xʲ	pətpàːsx’ė (Upper Savinja)	Palatalized x
ɣ		ɣ	kúːɣa (Upper Carniola)	
ǥ		g͉	ǥu̯áːu̯a (Rosen Valley)	Spirantized g
ǵ		ɟ?	'ǵẹzik (Prekmurje)	Palatal g
x́		ç?	mi̥'x́yːr (Inner Carniolan)	Palatal x
ɣx		ɣ̥᪽	kùːɣxa (Torre Valley)	ɣ that partially lost the voicing
h		ħ ~ ɦ	qúːha (Rosen Valley)	
h		ʕ ~ h	qúːha (Rosen Valley)	[ħ ~ ɦ] that lost voicing
q	q / ʔ / ꝗ	ʔ	déːqwa (Rosen Valley)	

Diacritics
RT	LT	IPA	Further details
Tones
V̑	V̀ː	V́ː	Long high-pitched vowel
V̏	V̀	V́	Short high-pitched vowel
V́	V́ː	V̀ː	Long low-pitched vowel
V̀	V́	V̀	Short low-pitched vowel
Ṽ	V́	V̂	High-low-pitched vowel (in Brdo dialect)
		V̆̀	Extra-short low-pitched vowel
Stress
V̄	ˈVː	Vː	Long stressed vowel
-	ˈVˑ	Vˑ	Semi-long stressed vowel
V̆	ˈV	V	Short stressed vowel
Other vowel diacritics
Ṽ	V̨	Ṽ	Nasal vowel
Ṿ		V̝͈	Raised tense vowel
V̇		see above	Extremely raised and tense vowel
V̧	V	V̞	Lowered vowel
V̭		see above	Neutral (mid) vowel
V̥		V̈	Centralized vowel
V̤		V̤	Breathy vowel
V̯		V̯	Short implosive and explosive vowel or semivowel
^{V}		(V̆)	Weak articulation, shortness
Consonants
C̄	Cː	Cː	Long consonant
C̃	C̃ / C̨	C̃	Nasal consonant
C̮		C̥᪽	Semi-voiced consonant
C̥		C̩	Syllabic consonant
C‛		Cʰ	Aspirated consonant
^{C}		(C̆)	Weak articulation, shortness
Other
C			Dummy consonant
V			Dummy vowel
ø			A sound that is not present, null ending
/ /			Phoneme
[ ]			Allophone
>			Derived from
<			Originates from

Notes:

- Letters marked with * are not part of the standard transcription.
- Both Logar and Ramovš used č́, ǯ́, š́, and ž́, however it is unknown whether they are palatal or only palatalized and what is the difference between them and palatalized č and ǯ, or palatal ć, ʒ́, ś, and ź.
- IPA transcriptions followed by a question mark are presumed; there was not enough research done to fully determine the transcription.
- The IPA transcriptions given are exact. When writing pronunciation generally, not all diacritics have to be used.
- On computers, V̔ can be used to represent.
