= Central Savinja dialect =

Dialect of Slovene

The Central Savinja dialect (srednjesavinjsko narečje, srednja savinjščina) is a Slovene dialect in the Styrian dialect group. It is spoken in the central Savinja Valley in the basins of the Bolska, Paka, and Hudinja rivers east of the Upper Savinja dialect and west of the Central Styrian dialect, south of the Mežica and South Pohorje dialects, and north of the Eastern Upper Carniolan, Zagorje-Trbovlje, and Laško subdialects. It includes the settlements of Trojane, Špitalič, Vransko, Topolšica, Šoštanj, Velenje, Frankolovo, Vojnik, and Celje.

== Phonological and morphological characteristics ==
The Central Savinja dialect has preserved accented short vowels. It does not have the change u > ü nor a > ɔ, the diphthongs ou and ei have monophthongized but ie and uo are pronounced, and there is limited akanye. Vocalic r has developed into ar and vocalic l into aw. The feminine singular instrumental ending for nouns and adjectives is -oj/-uj (in contrast to standard o).
