= Kozje-Bizeljsko dialect =

Slovene dialect spoken in southeastern Styria

- Bizeljsko-Sotla dialect
- Native to: Slovenia, Croatia
- Region: Southeastern Slovene Styria, from Podčetrtek to Brežice, Croatian villages of Dubravica and Kumrovec
- Ethnicity: Slovenes, Croats
- Language family: Indo-European: Balto-Slavic; Slavic; South Slavic; Western South Slavic; Slovene; Styrian dialect group; Kozje-Bizeljsko dialect
- Early forms: Southeastern Slovene dialect: Southern Slovene dialect; Southern Styrian dialect base
- Dialects: Kozje microdialects; Bizeljsko microdialects

Language codes
- ISO 639-3: –
- Kozje-Bizeljsko dialect.

The Kozje-Bizeljsko dialect (Slovene: kozjansko–bizeljsko narečje [kɔzˈjáːnskɔ biˈzéːlskɔ naˈɾéːt͡ʃjɛ]), also known as the Brežice-Kozje dialect (brežiško–kozjansko narečje [ˈbɾéːʒiʃkɔ kɔzˈjáːnskɔ naˈɾéːt͡ʃjɛ]) or the Bizeljsko-Sotla dialect (bizeljsko-obsoteljsko narečje [biˈzéːlskɔ ɔpˈsóːtəlskɔ naˈɾéːt͡ʃjɛ]), is a Slovene dialect spoken in southern Styria. As opposed to the Lower Sava Valley dialect, it is a more typical Styrian dialect, but it still shows some transitional nature with the Lower Carniolan dialect. It borders the Lower Sava Valley dialect to the west, the Central Styrian dialect to the north, the Kajkavian Zagorje-Međimurje dialect to the northeast, and the Lower Sutlan dialect to the southeast. The dialect belongs to the Styrian dialect group and evolved from the Southern Styrian dialect base.

== Geographical extension ==
The dialect is spoken in southern Styria, in the far northeast of the Lower Sava Valley, east of Mount Bohor, in the Kozje region (Slovene: Kozjansko), and extending north up to Jezerce pri Dobjem and Podčetrtek. It also extends to Croatia, in Kumrovec and Dubravica. Significant settlements include Podčetrtek, Dobje pri Planini, Žegar, Planina pri Sevnici, Pilštanj, Kozje, Kumrovec, Bistrica ob Sotli, Podsreda, Bizeljsko, Pišece, Kapele, Dobova, and Brežice.

== Accentual changes ==
The dialect has lost pitch accent as all other Styrian dialects and has recently also lost length distinctions because all of the short vowels have lengthened. In transitional microdialect of Mostec, the short accent in monosyllabic words remained short and the former acute accent is bimoraic, but the circumflex is monomoraic. It has undergone the *ženȁ → *žèna, *məglȁ → *mə̀gla and *visȍk → *vìsok accent shifts. Because of simplification of accent in declension, some microdialects have also morphologically correlated *sěnȏ > *sě̀no accent shift.

== Phonology ==
Because the dialect lies on the border with the Lower Carniolan dialect base (Lower Sava Valley dialect) and Kajkavian, all diphthongs have monophthongized, which is a rarity for Slovene dialects (the major exception, however, is most of the Upper Carniolan dialect, on which Standard Slovene is based). The only known microdialect with diphthongs for historically long vowels is that of Lesično.

Long yat (*ě̄) and non-final short yat (*ě̀-) turned into äː or eː in the northwest, around Planina pri Sevnici even to aː, elsewhere it turned into ẹː. Other long or later lengthened e-like vowels all turned into äː/eː in the north, eː in the central area (where they have a different reflex than *ě̄), and ẹː in the south. Syllabic *ł̥̄ and *ō/*ò- have the same reflex, which is uː in the whole area. Nasal *ǭ and *ǫ̀- are pronounced as ọː in most of the area; in some microdialects in the north and central area, as well as in the transitional microdialect of Mostec, it is pronounced as uː. *ū is centralized (üː). The long and later lengthened vowels *ā and *ī evolved in a typically Styrian manner into oː and iː/iː^{i̯}, respectively, although *ā retains its original pronunciation as aː in some southern microdialects and is pronounced as åː in the transitional microdialect of Mostec. The southern (Bizeljsko) microdialects vocalized the long semivowel to aː/åː, whereas in the northern (Kozje) microdialects it has merged with *ę̄ and *ē. High vowels are lowered before r, whereas stressed syllabic *r̥ mostly developed into ar, and the unaccented version developed into ər.

Recently lengthened final short vowels show some more reduction. They often merged with already long vowels or turned into äː, ö, iː, etc. Vowels of the type *bràt turned into briː^{e}t in the northwest. The semivowel in most microdialects turned into äː, åː, or eː. The same development is also true for stressed vowels after the accent shifts.

Soft *ĺ merged with *l, and *ń mostly turned into j, but might be realized as n at the end of a word. Sonorant *w turned into f before non-voiced non-sonorants and at the end of a word. It also appeared as a prothesis before *u as [v]. The cluster *šč simplified into *š. The clusters *tl, *tn, *dn, and *dl have sometimes turned into *kl, *kn, *gn, and *gl, respectively. Word-final *ł and *w also underwent major developments. They may have completely disappeared (e.g., fkraː in Sedlarjevo for 'ukradel'); other possibilities are also merging with the preceding vowel into o (typically Styrian) or u, as well as development into f (e.g., sọf for sol in Nezbiše).

== Morphology ==
The morphology is similar to other Styrian dialects. There is no distinction between soft and hard declensions, and the analogical t/d in l-participles before -l are mostly undeveloped. It still has mixed accent, but it is often replaced due to the *sěnȏ > *sě̀no accent shift. The Styrian feature of the a-stem instrumental singular ending -oj (instead of -o) is common only in the south.

== Sources ==
- Logar, Tine (1996). Kenda-Jež, Karmen (ed.). Dialektološke in jezikovnozgodovinske razprave [Dialectological and etymological discussions] (in Slovenian). Ljubljana: Znanstvenoraziskovalni center SAZU, Inštitut za slovenski jezik Frana Ramovša. ISBN 961-6182-18-8.
- Ramovš, Fran (1935). Historična gramatika slovenskega jezika [Historical grammar of the Slovene language]. VII. Dialekti (in Slovenian). Ljubljana: Znanstveno društvo za humanistične vede v Ljubljani.
- Šekli, Matej (2018). Legan Ravnikar, Andreja (ed.). Tipologija lingvogenez slovanskih jezikov. Collection Linguistica et philologica (in Slovenian). Translated by Plotnikova, Anastasija. Ljubljana: Znanstvenoraziskovalni center SAZU. ISBN 978-961-05-0137-4.
- Zorko, Zinka (2014-10-02). Kozjansko – bizeljsko narečje – glasoslovje pišečkega govora (in Slovenian). pp. 111–113.
