= Kozjak subdialect =

Subdialect of Slovene

The Kozjak subdialect (kozjaški govor) is a Slovene subdialect in the Styrian dialect group. It is a subdialect of the South Pohorje dialect, which it greatly resembles, and is the northernmost member of the Styrian dialect group. It encompasses the Kozjak Mountains north of the Drava River and partially extends into Austria, including the Leutschach area.

== Phonological and morphological characteristics ==
The Kozjak subdialect has the typical Styrian diphthongs ei and ou as well as two open glides as reflexes of old acute yat and neoacute e and o.
