= Solčava subdialect =

Subdialect of Slovene

The Solčava subdialect (solčavski govor) is a Slovene subdialect in the Styrian dialect group. It is a subdialect of the Upper Savinja dialect spoken around Solčava and the Logar Valley. It is the westernmost of the (sub)dialects in the Styrian dialect group.

== Phonological and morphological characteristics ==
The Solčava subdialect is partially influenced by Carinthian dialects. The subdialect has the Upper Carniolan vowel system (except for the Upper Carniolan reflexes of long yers, here becoming e:/a:) and a slightly closer quality of e, becoming diphthongized to i:e. Secondarily accented e and o become e: and o:, as in Upper Carniolan. The reflex of short and secondarily accented ə is also the same as in Upper Carniolan.
