= Iztok Mlakar =

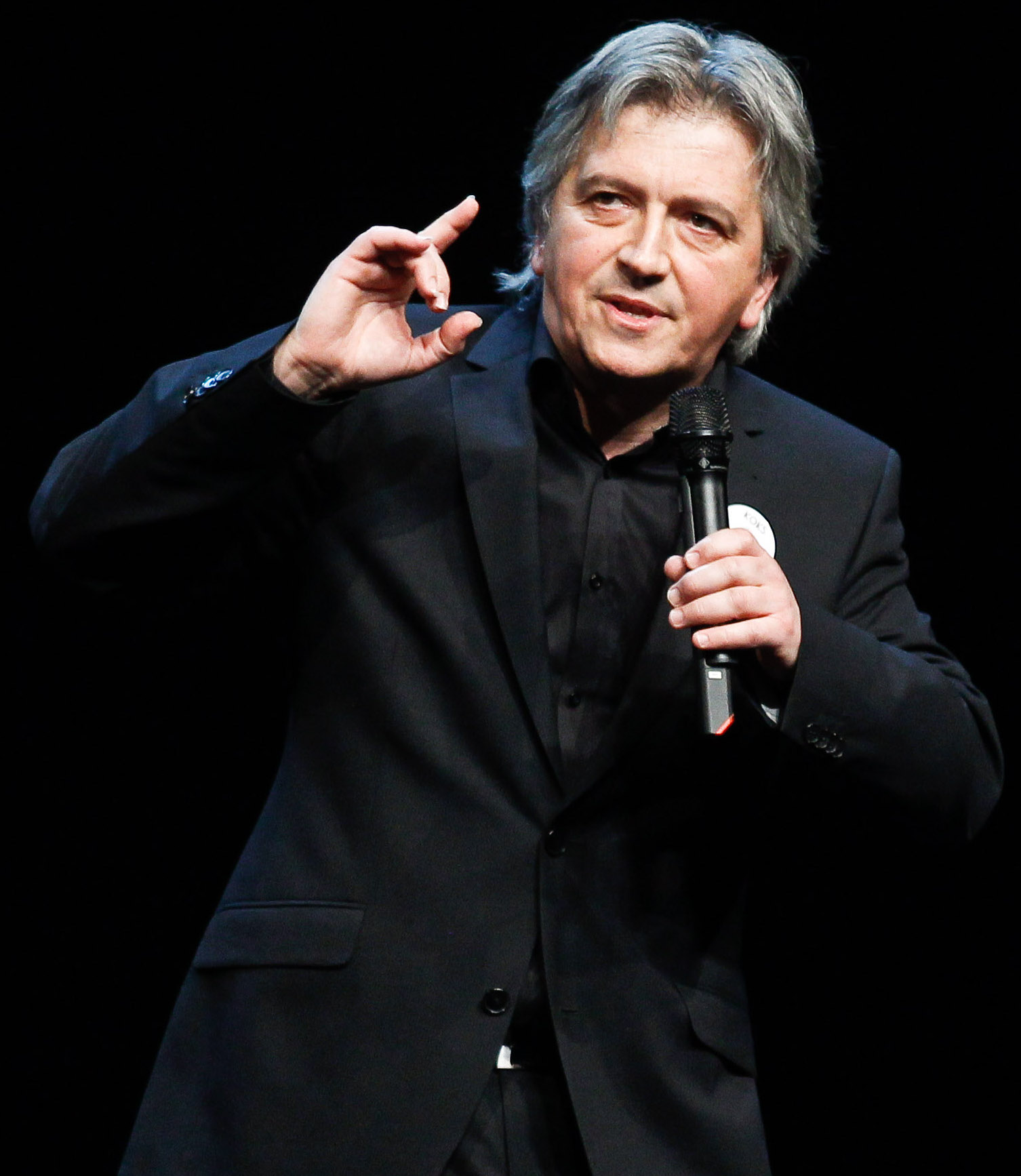
- Iztok Mlakar in 2012

Background information
- Born: Iztok Mlakar; 21 June 1961 (age 65); Postojna, SR Slovenia, Yugoslavia (Now Slovenia)
- Origin: Nova Gorica, Slovenia
- Occupations: Theatre actor, singer-songwriter

Iztok Mlakar (born 21 June 1961) is a Slovenian singer-songwriter and theatre actor. Styled as the "bard of the Slovenian Littoral", he is best known for his ironic chansons in the Littoral dialect of Slovene. Together with Adi Smolar, Mlakar is among the best-known singer-songwriters in Slovenia since 1990.

He was born in Postojna in western Slovenia (then part of Yugoslavia), and spent his youth in the town of Nova Gorica on the border with Italy. His parents were from Cerkno, and Mlakar composed several songs in the distinctive Cerkno dialect of his parents' native region.

== Career ==
After graduating from the Nova Gorica Grammar School, Mlakar studied acting at the Academy for Theatre, Radio, Film and Television in Ljubljana, graduating from the drama program in 1986. He pursued a career as an actor in the Slovenian National Theatre of Nova Gorica, where he currently works. He has written many songs for plays, but he is best known as the composer and singer of his own chanson-style songs. In 1993, he received the Ježek Award.

== Chansons ==
Mlakar is best known to the Slovenian public as a singer of songs composed in his local Slovene dialect. His songs are frequently witty and unusual reflections on eternal subjects such as love, passing and death, and also about the joys of life, particularly wine and good food. Always written from the perspective of the little man, they are often bitter comments on the struggle of daily life and the injustice of social and political settings.

His early songs contained many ironic commentaries on daily life in Titoist Yugoslavia. Mlakar mostly sings about unusual personal stories, which highlight the absurdities and anxieties of the lives of the common people.

=== Language of the songs ===
Mlakar does not use standard Slovene in his songs, except in a few cases, when he wants to mark the differences in the social status of the characters of his stories. The majority of his songs are sung in the Karst dialect, which is the most distinctive and widely spoken Slovene dialect in the Slovenian Littoral. It is also spoken in the areas around the town of Nova Gorica, especially Solkan and Šempeter pri Gorici. The language of most of Mlakar's songs is based on the distinctive dialects of these areas, which have been strongly influenced by Italian and Friulian, especially in vocabulary and syntax.

Fewer of his songs are sung in the Inner Carniolan dialect, as it is spoken in the upper Vipava Valley ("Bose noge"), while others (such as "Pubi, usidma se", "Var se, čeča" and "Očenaš") are sung in the Cerkno dialect, which differs considerably from the dialect used in his other songs because it belongs to the different Rovte dialect group.

The vocabulary of most of Mlakar's songs is frequently difficult to understand for speakers from other Slovenian regions. The use of dialect and juicy expressions conveys a sense of familiarity to his songs.

=== Lyrics ===
Survival tactics, idiosyncrasies and anxieties of simple people are some of the constant themes of Mlakar's songs, as are joy for life and the seeking of pleasure. The characters of Mlakar's songs present a typical Slovene character. He sings about the simple Slovene man and woman of the 20th and 21st centuries, who are frequently oppressed by big historical events such as the world wars, expansionist policies of large nations, changing political regimes, unstable economic situations and shifts in moral and social customs. The characters of Mlakar's songs cope with these circumstances in different ways: they either stubbornly defy them ("Karlo Špacapan"), frequently becoming silly and pathetic in the process ("Pepi Žbaradorija"), accept them with a sense of poetic fatalism ("Bertolin in Štefana"), or opportunistically try to accommodate to them ("Politik Gvido"). Many of his songs narrate outbursts of anger directed against authority: some of them result in a temporary victory ("Ivo Balila"), some end in compromise ("Pubi usidma se"), while others remain a dream of a distant future egalitarian retaliation ("Puntarska", "Politik Gvido").

Many lyrics are an intelligent ironic comment on acute problems of contemporary Slovenian society, such as alcoholism ("Beštija"), drug abuse ("Marjo Špinel") and suicide ("Briškula"). Some lyrics ridicule the provincial customs of an enriched post-communist society ("Fool cool", "Truckin' rap", "Bogatašev song"). Many of them convey an unusual life philosophy or acquired wisdom ("Credo", "Počasno življenje", "Pismo"). Most of them, however, are about love, sex and the often difficult relations between men and women. These include stories of love and passion bridging ethnic and social divides ("Furlanka", "Valentin", "Var se čeča"); many are ironic songs about romantic deception ("Brika", "Valentinčič Rudi in Pepa Žgabucin") and stories of unfulfilled romantic promises ("Dešpet", "Vandima"). Only a few are traditional ballads of failed love ("En glaž vina mi dej").

== Public performances ==
Mlakar is known for avoiding publicity. He has never performed at a big concert or public event, preferring small and selected audiences. His public performances are rare, and usually there is a very high interest in them, making it hard to get tickets. Such a style of performance usually goes well with the topics of his songs. With good food and wine, the audience gets in a good mood and participates in singing his songs.

== Discography ==
- Štorije in baldorije (1992)
1. Pepi Žbaradorija
2. Republika Palma de Cocco
3. Puntarska
4. Vandima
5. Pubi, usidma se
6. Karlo Špacapan
7. Beštija
8. Štefana in Bertolin
9. En glaž vina mi dej
- Balade in štroncade (1994)
1. Od Franca Frančeškina god
2. Soča
3. Full cool
4. Božična
5. Politik Gvido
6. Valentin
7. Počasno življenje
8. Brika (ki b' rad)
9. Betula
- Rimarije iz oštarije (2001)
1. Blues
2. Rudi Valentinčič in Pepa Žgabucin
3. Credo
4. Dešpet
5. Čikorija an' kafe
6. Marjo Špinel
7. Ivo Balila
8. Var'se, čeča
9. Briškula
- Romance brez krjance (2008)
1. Oda
2. Bose noge
3. Pismo
4. Furlanka
5. Žena al flaša
6. Pokora
7. Truckin' rap (Recitativ za bariton, kamion in basso continuo)
8. Bogatašev song
9. Očenaš
- Porkaeva! (2017)
1. Izvirni greh
2. Volitve
3. Ajnglc
4. Kontrabas
5. Ja
6. Belo in rdeče
7. Šuolni
8. Hudič!!!
9. Čuoja
