= Lower Sava Valley dialect =

Slovene dialect spoken in Central and Lower Sava Valley

- Posavsko narečje
- Pronunciation: [puˈsaːu̯sk naˈɾɛːi̯t͡ʃjɛ]
- Native to: Slovenia
- Region: Lower Sava Valley, Central Sava Valley, along the lower stream of Savinja river
- Ethnicity: Slovenes
- Language family: Indo-European: Balto-Slavic; Slavic; South Slavic; Western South Slavic; Slovene; Styrian dialect group; Lower Sava Valley dialect
- Dialects: Laško subdialect; Zagorje-Trbovlje subdialect; Sevnica-Krško subdialect

Language codes
- ISO 639-3: –
- Lower Sava Valley dialect.

The Lower Sava Valley dialect (Slovene: posavsko narečje [pɔˈsáːwskɔ naˈɾéːt͡ʃjɛ], posavščina) is a Slovene dialect spoken in the Central and Lower Sava Valley. It is a transitional dialect between the Lower Carniolan and Styrian dialects. It borders the Lower Carniolan dialect to the west, Upper Carniolan dialect to the northwest, Central Savinja dialect to the north, Central Styrian dialect to the northeast, Kozje-Bizeljsko dialect to the east, and Lower Sutlan Kajkavian dialect to the south, as well as Chakavian and Eastern Herzegovian to the southeast. It is further divided into three subdialects: the northwestern Zagorje-Trbovlje subdialect, northeastern Laško subdialect, and southern Sevnica-Krško subdialect. The dialect belongs to the Styrian dialect group and evolved from Lower Carniolan dialect base.

The subdialects differ mostly by the amount of non-Lower Carniolan features. The Sevnica-Krško subdialect is closest to the Lower Carniolan dialect, whereas the Laško subdialect is closest to Styrian dialects. The Zagorje-Trbovlje subdialect is influenced by both Styrian and Upper Carniolan features, and it is generally closer to Standard Slovene because of immigration to this area.

The dialect is one of the most poorly studied dialects.

== Geographical distribution ==
The dialect extends across the Central Sava Valley and most of the Lower Sava Valley, from Zgornji Log along the Sava River to the national border around Obrežje. It also extends along the lower course of the Savinja River from Debro to the Sava River and along the Krka River from Kostanjevica na Krki eastward. The dialect is not spoken in the (north)eastern part of Lower Sava Valley in the area around Brežice, Dobova, and Koprivnica, where the Kozje-Bizeljsko dialect is spoken. The border with Serbo-Croatian dialects follows the national border, except for the villages of Črešnjevec, Črneča Vas, Oštrc, Vrbje, and Vrtača, where Chakavian is traditionally spoken. The Sevnica-Krško subdialect extends north up to Sopota, Čimerno, Radeče, Žirovnica, Podgorica, and Podgorje ob Sevnični. The Laško subdialect extends westward up to Obrežje pri Zidanem Mostu, Senožete, Rimske Toplice, Trnovo, and Zgornja Rečica, whereas in Klenovo the Zagorje-Trbovlje subdialect is already spoken. Notable settlements include Sava, Litija, Polšnik, Zagorje ob Savi, Trbovlje, Hrastnik, and Zidani Most in the Zagorje-Trbovlje subdialect, Rimske Toplice and Laško in the Laško subdialect, and Radeče, Loka pri Zidanem Mostu, Dolenji Boštanj, Sevnica, Blanca, Brestanica, Senovo, Krško, Studenec, Leskovec pri Krškem, Raka, Cerklje ob Krki, Podbočje, and Kostanjevica ob Krki in the Sevnica-Krško subdialect.

== Accentual changes ==
The dialect differs significantly regarding accentual changes; however, the feature that forms of the dialect have in common (and also one of the defining things separating it from the Lower Carniolan dialect) is that pitch accent has been lost, as in all other Styrian dialects. The dialect is in the late stages of losing length distinctions because all short vowels tend to lengthen. In Kostanjevica ob Krki, short vowels are still more often represented by a short vowel, whereas in Stržišče only schwa (ə) can be short, and all vowels are long in Laško.

The dialect has undergone the *ženȁ → *žèna shift, which is true for both the Styrian and Lower Carniolan dialects. It has also undergone the *məglȁ → *mə̀gla accent shift and, as opposed to the Eastern Lower Carniolan subdialect, it is consistent. Most of the dialect also underwent the *visȍk → *vìsok shift, but only western parts of the Zagorje-Trbovlje subdialect have undergone it in most words, and the Sevnica-Krško subdialect does not apply it consistently. In Kostanjevica ob Krki, such examples are rare (e.g., ˈdəkle). There is also partial or full morphologization of accent (see the section Morphology).

== Phonology ==
The dialect has older Lower Carniolan features combined with younger Styrian features. It can be differentiated from other Styrian dialects primarily by having the same reflexes for Alpine Slovene long and non-final short vowels due to the early lengthening in the Lower Carniolan base (except for ō/ò-, which also have different reflexes in other Lower Carniolan dialects) and the a reflex for Alpine Slavic long *ə̄ (other Syrian dialects have an e reflex, except for the southern Central Savinja and Kozje-Bizeljsko dialects).

Alpine Slavic *ě̄ evolved into eːi̯ or has further simplified into ẹː or ḙː, particularly in the Zagorje-Trbovlje subdialect. The vowels *ę̄ and *ē merged and have an iːe reflex. Nasal *ǭ and non-final short *ò- have merged and have an uːọ reflex, and in Laško the reflex can be also uːo or oː. Long *ō merged with *ū and is usually pronounced as uː. In some areas, however, it is pronounced as u̧ or even as uːu̯ in some microdialects. Similar evolution also happened to *ī. Secondarily stressed *e and *o turned into i̯eː and u̯oː, respectively; in the Trbovlje microdialect, the first turned into i̯ȧ. Syllabic *ł̥̄ turned into oːu and *r̥̄ turned into ə(ː)r, rarely into a(ː)r. Secondarily stressed *ə can also have the same reflexes as secondarily stressed *e.

Short stressed vowels tend to lengthen and sometimes also diphthongize. Short stressed *ȉ and *ȕ lengthened into iː (or sometimes eː) and uː in the east, but turned into *ə in the west. There is limited akanye (*o/ǫ → *a); more common is ukanye (change to u), which is quite prominent in the Laško subdialect. Many unstressed vowels were reduced to ə, particularly in the west. The Zagorje-Trbovlje subdialect also has the syllabic sonorants l̥, m̥, n̥, r̥, which formed after the neighboring unstressed vowels disappeared.

Palatal *ĺ merged with *l, whereas palatal *ń has different reflexes (n, j) varying between microdialects and different positions, but j is more common. Final non-sonorants became devoiced, and the cluster šč simplified into š, except at the beginning of a word in the Zagorje-Trbovlje subdialect. The phoneme *l turned into dark interdental [l̪͆] everywhere except before *i and *u in the Zagorje-Trbovlje subdialect. The clusters črě-, žrě- retain the r in some words but not in others.

== Morphology ==
There is strong masculinization of the neuter and feminization in the plural (but the latter is rare in the Laško subdialect). The long infinitive without final -i is used, except in parts of the Zagorje-Trbovlje subdialect, where the short infinitive is used. Verbs do not often follow the -a-ti -je-m paradigm common for Styrian dialects (e.g., umivati → umivljem 'wash'). In the Laško subdialect, mobile accent on nouns is retained and mixed accent is still present, although sometimes lost. In the other two subdialects, the mixed and final accent was completely lost because of morphologization of accent. At least in the Zagorje-Trbovlje subdialect, the dialect has the Styrian ending -ma instead of -va for verbs in the first person dual.

== Sources ==
- Korošec, Tomo (2007). "Govor mesta Laško". In Maček, Jože (ed.). Laški zbornik 2007 (in Slovenian). Laško: Knjižnica Laško. pp. 143–156.
- Medved, Aleksandra; Smole, Vera (2005). "Trboveljski govor in rudarska kuharska leksika". In Čeh, Jožica; Jesenšek, Marko; Rajh, Bernard (eds.). Knjižno in narečno besedoslovje slovenskega jezika. Zora 32 (in Slovenian). Maribor: Slavistično društvo Maribor. pp. 69–88. ISBN 961-6320-26-2.
- Ramovš, Fran (1935). Historična gramatika slovenskega jezika [Historical grammar of the Slovene language]. VII. Dialekti (in Slovenian). Ljubljana: Znanstveno društvo za humanistične vede v Ljubljani.
- Smole, Vera (1999). "Je govor Kostanjevice na Krki res vzhodnodolenjski?". In Čeh, Jožica; Zorko, Zinka; Koletnik, Mihaela (eds.). Logarjev zbornik. Zora 8 (in Slovenian). Maribor: Slavistično društvo Maribor. pp. 64–70. ISBN 961-6320-00-9.
- Šekli, Matej (2018). Legan Ravnikar, Andreja (ed.). Tipologija lingvogenez slovanskih jezikov. Collection Linguistica et philologica (in Slovenian). Translated by Plotnikova, Anastasija. Ljubljana: Znanstvenoraziskovalni center SAZU. ISBN 978-961-05-0137-4.
- Škofic, Jožica; et al. (2016). SLOVENSKI lingvistični atlas. 2, Kmetija [Kartografsko gradivo] (in Slovenian). Ljubljana: Založba ZRC. pp. 11–23. ISBN 978-961-254-879-7.
- Zemljak Jontes, Melita (2001) [14 August 2015]. "Fonološki opis posavskega govora v Stržišču". In Keber, Janez (ed.). Jezikovni zapiski. 7/1–2 (in Slovenian). Ljubljana: Založba ZRC SAZU. pp. 349–363. doi:10.3986/jz.v7i1-2.2659. ISSN 0354-0448.
