= Inner Carniolan dialect =

Slovene dialect spoken in western Inner Carniola and southeastern Littoral

- ˈnuːətrańsku naˈreːi̯či̯e
- Pronunciation: [ˈnuːətɾaɲsku naˈɾɛːi̯t͡ʃjɛ]
- Native to: Slovenia, Italy
- Region: Western Inner Carniola, upper Vipava Valley, southern Karst Plateau
- Ethnicity: Slovenes
- Language family: Indo-European: Balto-Slavic; Slavic; South Slavic; Western South Slavic; Slovene; Littoral dialect group; Inner Carniolan dialect

Language codes
- ISO 639-3: –
- Inner Carniolan dialect

The Inner Carniolan dialect (Slovene: notranjsko narečje [ˈnòːtɾanskɔ naˈɾéːt͡ʃjɛ], notranjščina) is a Slovene dialect very close to the Lower Carniolan dialect, but with more recent accent shifts. It is spoken in a relatively large area, extending from western Inner Carniola up to Trieste in Italy, also covering the upper Vipava Valley and the southern part of the Karst Plateau. The dialect borders the Lower Carniolan dialect to the east, the Črni Vrh and Horjul dialects to the north, the Karst dialect to the northwest, the Istrian dialect to the southwest, and Central Chakavian and Northern Chakavian to the south. The dialect belongs to the Littoral dialect group, and it evolved from the Lower Carniolan dialect base.

== Geographic distribution ==
The dialect is spoken in most of the municipalities of Postojna, Pivka, Ilirska Bistrica, Divača, Hrpelje-Kozina, and Vipava, in most areas of the municipalities of Sežana and Ajdovščina, as well as the municipalities of Monrupino and Sgonico in Italy, and in many Slovene-inhabited villages in the Municipality of Trieste (most notably in Opicina, Slovene: Opčine). Geographically, the dialect is bounded by the Javornik Hills to the east and the national border to the southeast; it extends to the southwest to Gradišče pri Materiji, to the west to Slavnik and Kozina, in Italy to the coast, and to north to Predmeja.

== Accentual changes ==
The Inner Carniolan dialect has undergone more accent shifts than the Lower Carniolan dialect because of the influence of other Littoral dialects. It has undergone four accent shifts: *ženȁ → *žèna, *məglȁ → *mə̀gla, *visȍk → vìsok, and *ropotȁt → *ròpotat. Some southeastern microdialects have also partially undergone the *sěnȏ / *prosȏ → *sě̀no / *pròso accent shift (e.g., imȃ → ˈiːma in the Jelšane microdialect), although most of these changes are morphologically correlated. It has also lost pitch accent and is in the process of losing the distinction between long and short vowels because the short ones are lengthening.

== Phonology ==
In terms of phonology, the Inner Carniolan dialect is very similar to the Lower Carniolan dialect. Diphthongs mostly retained their form or have monophthongized in some parts, particularly near the Karst and Črni Vrh dialects, which come from different dialect bases and their diphthongs are therefore often different, which led to monphthongization on bordering microdialects on both sides. Alpine Slovene *ě̄ and non-final *ě̀ show this phenomenon the most. In most dialects, this is still pronounced as the diphthong eːi̯, but in microdialects, such as Sežana, Dutovlje, Vrabče, Štjak, and northwest from there, as well as in microdialects around Predmeja and Otlica, it has monophthongized into eː. Similar assimilation also occurred in the Brkini Hills and northern Pivka Basin. In the southern part of the Pivka Basin, however, the diphthong dissimilated into ȧːi̯, ạːi̯, or oːi̯ going south. In contrast to *ě, Alpine Slavic *ę̄, non-final *ę̀, *ē, and non-final *è are pronounced quite similarly throughout the dialect, remaining the diphthong iːe or slightly reduced to iːə. Similarly, *ǭ, *ò, and non-final *ǫ̀ remained uːo or reduced to uːə. Non-final *ō turned into uː, but remained a diphthong oːu before č, š, z, or s. *ī and *ā mostly remained unchanged, but *ū turned into yː, except in words introduced to the dialect later, where it is still uː. Proto-Slavic *ł̥ turned into oːu̯.

Palatal *ĺ and *ń remained palatal, *tł changed into kł, *tl and *dl in the l-participle simplified into l, and *g turned into ɣ.

== Morphology ==
Dual forms are different from the plural in the nominative and accusative cases only, and verbs have generally lost their dual forms. There is a tendency to fix the accent when declining (i.e., for nouns to have fixed accent). Neuter gender is neither masculinized nor feminized, and the infinitive stem sometimes became the same as present stem. Verbs with two possible accents in the infinitive have all l-participle forms accented like the masculine singular form. The long infinitive was replaced by the short one, and the verb endings -ta and -te always have the -s- infix (pˈriːdesta, ˈviːdiste). The imperative does not undergo the č → c change.

Southern microdialects no longer have s-stem nouns; they have turned into o-stems. In doing so, if the accent was on the infix, it shifted one syllable to the left, a feature that also extended into the nominative case, where it originally did not have the infix: ˈkuːłu ˈkuːla for standard Slovene kolȏ kolẹ̑sa 'bicycle' in the nominative and genitive singular.

== Vocabulary ==
Lexically, the dialect shows extensive influence from Romance languages.

== Sociolinguistic aspects ==
About 90,000 Slovene speakers live in the areas where the dialect is traditionally spoken. Although there are no precise statistics, it is likely that a large majority of them have some degree of knowledge of the dialect. This makes it the most widely spoken dialect in the Slovenian Littoral and among the 10 most spoken Slovene dialects.

In most rural areas, especially in the Vipava Valley and on the Karst Plateau, the dialect predominates over standard Slovene (or its regional variety). Differently from many other Slovene dialects, the Inner Carniolan dialect is commonly used in many urban areas, especially in the towns of Ajdovščina, Vipava, and Opicina (Italy). In the towns, where commuting to the capital, Ljubljana, is more common (Postojna), the dialect is being slowly replaced by a regional version of standard Slovene.

== Culture ==
There is no distinctive literature in Inner Carniolan. However, features of the dialects are present in the texts of the Lutheran philologist Sebastjan Krelj (born in Vipava) and the Baroque preacher Tobia Lionelli (born in Vipavski Križ).

The folk rock group Ana Pupedan uses the dialect in most of its lyrics. The singer-songwriter Iztok Mlakar has also employed it in some of his chansons. The comedian and satirical writer Boris Kobal has used it in some of his performances, and so has the comedian Igor Malalan.

== Bibliography ==
- Logar, Tine (1996). Kenda-Jež, Karmen (ed.). Dialektološke in jezikovnozgodovinske razprave [Dialectological and etymological discussions] (in Slovenian). Ljubljana: Znanstvenoraziskovalni center SAZU, Inštitut za slovenski jezik Frana Ramovša. ISBN 961-6182-18-8.
- Rigler, Jakob (1986). Jakopin, Franc (ed.). RAZPRAVE O SLOVENSKEM JEZIKU [Discussions about Slovene language] (in Slovenian). Ljubljana: Bogo Grafenauer.
- Rigler, Jakob (2001). "1: Jezikovnozgodovinske in dialektološke razprave" [1: Linguohistorical and dialectological discussions]. In Smole, Vera (ed.). Zbrani spisi / Jakob Rigler [Collected essays / Jakob Rigler] (in Slovenian). Vol. 1. Ljubljana: Založba ZRC. ISBN 961-6358-32-4.
- Šekli, Matej (2018). Legan Ravnikar, Andreja (ed.). Topologija lingvogenez slovanskih jezikov (in Slovenian). Translated by Plotnikova, Anastasija. Ljubljana: Znanstvenoraziskovalni center SAZU. ISBN 978-961-05-0137-4.
