= North Pohorje–Remšnik dialect =

Dialect of Slovene

The North Pohorje–Remšnik dialect (Slovene: severnopohorsko-remšniško narečje) is a Slovene dialect in the Carinthian dialect group. It is spoken east of the Mežica dialect on both sides of the Drava River, extending westwards to east of Dravograd, and eastwards to west of Fala and west of Selnica ob Dravi. It also extends northwards across the Austrian border at Soboth and north of the Radlje ob Dravi border crossing. Major settlements in the dialect area are Muta, Vuzenica, Radlje ob Dravi, Vuhred, Ribnica na Pohorju, Lovrenc na Pohorju, and Fala.

== Phonological and morphological characteristics ==
The North Pohorje–Remšnik dialect lacks pitch accent and long a > ɔ. The dialects contains the clusters tl/dl (sometimes > kl/gl). Neuter nouns have largely become feminine, and the adjectival suffix -ok is often -ek.
