= Ana Pupedan =

Slovenian cross-genre band

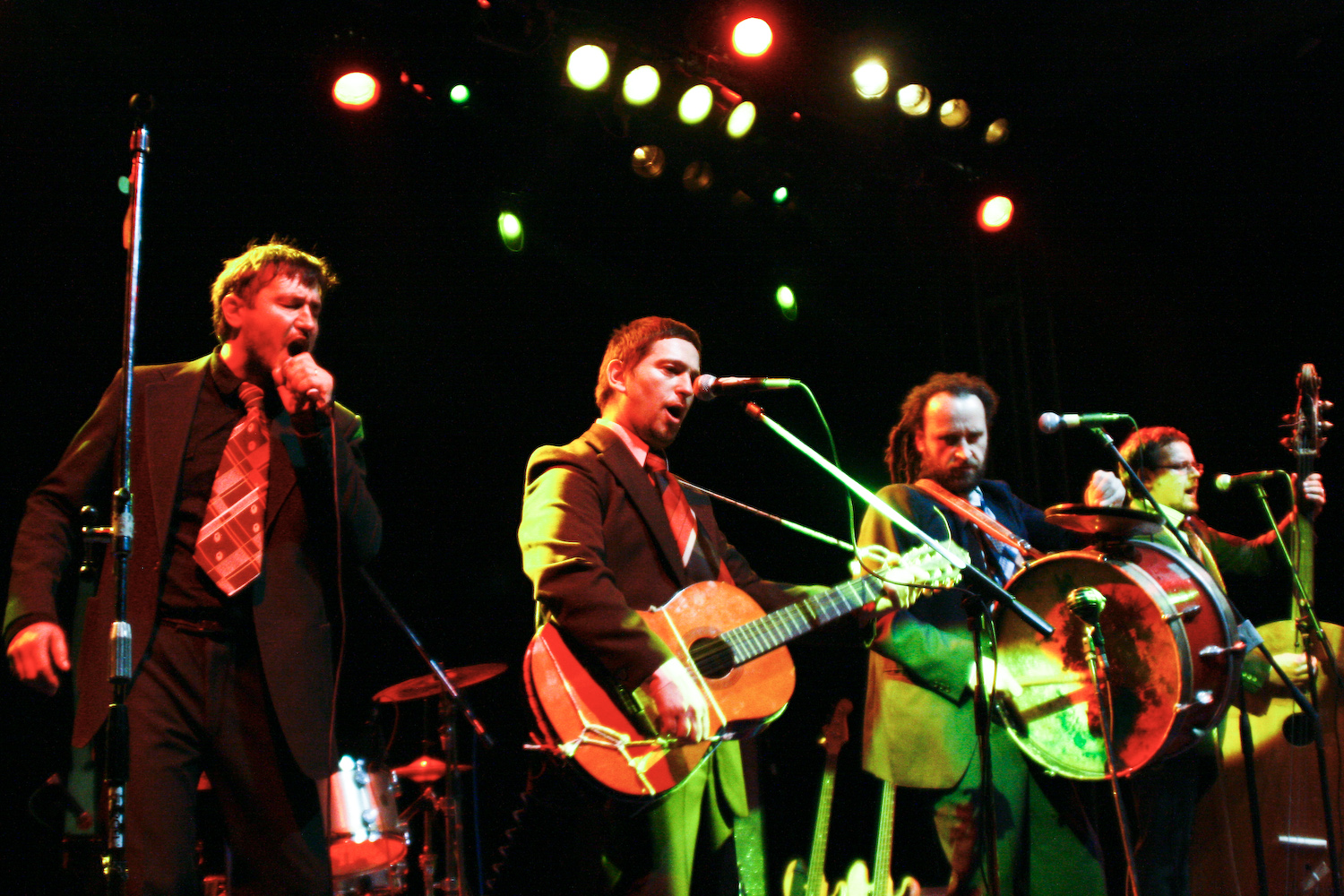
- Ana Pupedan

Background information
- Origin: Slovenia
- Genres: Jazz, Punk, Country, Blues, Ska, Reggae
- Years active: 1992 – now
- Members: Simon Avsec, Boštjan Požar, Marko Doles, Peter Žnidaršič
- Website: www.anapupedan.com

Ana Pupedan is a musical group from Pivka, Slovenia. The band was founded in 1992 by Simon Avsec (vocal, violin), Boštjan Požar (guitar, clarinet), Peter Žnidaršič (bass guitar), and Marko Doles (drums).

In the local Slovene dialect, "Ana Pupedan" means One in the afternoon, but many mistakenly believe that the band's name stands for a woman.

== Discography ==
- Anje Pupedanju (1995 KŠOPP, reissue 1998, Vinilmanija)
- Ante prupagandni balar (1998, Vinilmanija)
- Brez naslova (2001, self distribution)
- Na domači brjači (2010, Založba Radia Študent (ZARŠ))
