= Sevnica-Krško subdialect =

Subdialect of Slovene

The Sevnica-Krško subdialect (sevniško-krški govor) is a Slovene subdialect in the Styrian dialect group. It is a subdialect of the Lower Sava Valley dialect, extending along both banks of the Sava River from Zidani Most to just before Brežice, and then continuing on the right bank to the Croatian border. The main settlements in the dialect area are Radeče, Loka pri Zidanem Mostu, Boštanj, Sevnica, Zabukovje nad Sevnico, Brestanica, Senovo, Krško, Drnovo, Cerklje ob Krki, Čatež ob Savi, and Velika Dolina.

== Phonological and morphological characteristics ==
The Sevnica-Krško subdialect is transitional between Lower Carniolan and Styrian dialects; specifically, a Lower Carniolan substrate overlaid with Styrian features. It is characterized by loss of pitch accent. Phonologically, it shows the Lower Carniolan development of ě > ei̯, circumflected o > u, e and ę > ie, neoacute o and ǫ > u, syllabic ł > ou̯, r > ər/ar, and ə > a, but is distinguished by the diphthongizations i > ii̯ and u > uu̯.
