= Zagorje-Trbovlje subdialect =

Subdialect of Slovene

The Zagorje-Trbovlje subdialect (zagorsko-trboveljski govor) is a Slovene subdialect in the Styrian dialect group. It is a subdialect of the Lower Sava Valley dialect and is spoken in the Central Sava Valley, including the settlements of Zagorje ob Savi, Trbovlje, and Hrastnik.

== Phonological and morphological characteristics ==
The Zagorje-Trbovlje subdialect has a vowel system characterized by ie and uo-type diphthongs, like the Lower Carniolan dialects, but unlike these dialects it has stress accent rather than a pitch accent.
