= Jaun Valley dialect =

Dialect of Slovene

The Jaun Valley dialect (Slovene: podjunsko narečje, podjunščina) is a Slovene dialect in the Carinthian dialect group. It is primarily spoken in the Jaun Valley of Carinthia, Austria as well as in Strojna and Libeliče, Slovenia. It is spoken west of a line from Diex to Völkermarkt to Eberndorf, east of Sittersdorf, and north of the Ebriach dialect. Major settlements in the dialect area are Griffen, Kühnsdorf, Globasnitz, Bleiburg, and Lavamünd.

== Phonological and morphological characteristics ==
The Jaun Valley dialect has pitch accent and there has been accentual retraction from final circumflexes. It lacks Slovenian palatalization, has partially preserved the Proto-Slavic nasal vowels, long ə > a, Proto-Slavic a > ɔ, ła > wa, the phoneme /w/ is preserved, and šč > š. The addition of š- before deictics in t- (e.g., štam for tam 'there'; known as štekanje in Slovene) is typical. The dialects contains a number of subdialects, primarily differing from north to south, but also from east to west to some extent.
