= Rosen Valley dialect =

Dialect of Slovene

The Rosen Valley dialect (Slovene: rožansko narečje, rožanščina) is a Slovene dialect in the Carinthian dialect group. It is spoken in the Rosen Valley (Note: Unlike the Gail Valley, the Rosen Valley is not named after a river, but after the defunct microtoponym Rasa. The German name can be found deconstructed as Rosen Valley in English in various works.) (German: Rosental, Slovene: Rož) of Austria, west of a line from Villach to Faak am See and east of a line from Sittersdorf and Lake Klopein to Brückl, excluding the Ebriach dialect area to the southeast. Settlements in the dialect area include Wernberg, Köstenberg, Velden am Wörthersee, Ludmannsdorf, Köttmannsdorf, Viktring, Grafenstein, Tainach, and Rosegg (all north of the Drava River), and Sankt Jakob im Rosental, Feistritz im Rosental, Windisch Bleiberg, Ferlach, Zell, and Gallizien (south of the Drava River).

== Phonological and morphological characteristics ==
The Rosen Valley dialect has pitch accent and is distinguished by the preservation of the accent on short syllables following short e and o. The dialect has diphthongs of the type iə < long jat and uə < long o, akanye of e, and development of velar k, g > uvular q, χ, and palatalization of k, g, h > č, ž, š before front vowels. The dialect lacks standard the Slovene morphophonemic alternation between [l] and [w]; for example, [piu̯], [piu̯a] instead of [piu̯], [pila] 'drank' (masc., fem.), a phenomenon known as švapanje in Slovene.
