= Bača subdialect =

Subdialect of Slovene

The Bača subdialect (baški govor, baško podnarečje) is a Slovene subdialect of the Tolmin dialect in the Rovte dialect group. It is spoken around Podbrdo in the triangular area bounded by Bača pri Podbrdu, Porezen, and Mount Rodica (1966 m).

== Phonological and morphological characteristics ==
The Bača subdialect is a transitional dialect between the Upper Carniolan dialect group and the Rovte dialect group. Like the rest of the Tolmin dialect, it is generally characterized by akanye, but the local dialect of the village of Rut lacks this feature. The dialectologist Tine Logar has suggested that this may be due to the influence of German colonization. Another special feature of Rut, together with the villages of Stržišče and Podbrdo, is the merger of alveolar and palatal fricatives into alveolo-palatals: s/š > /ɕ/, z/ž > /ʑ/, a phenomenon known in Slovene as slekanje. This phonological development has also been attributed to German influence.
