= Slovene dialects =

Varieties of the Slovene language

Map of Slovene dialect groups Carinthian Littoral Rovte Upper Carniolan Lower Carniolan Styrian Pannonian

In a purely dialectological sense, Slovene dialects (Slovene: slovenska narečja [sloʋènska narét͡ʃja], Serbo-Croatian: slovenska narječja [slǒʋeːnskaː nǎːrjeːt͡ʃja]) are the regionally diverse varieties that evolved from old Slovene, a South Slavic language of which the standardized modern version is Standard Slovene. This also includes several dialects in Croatia, most notably the so-called Western Goran dialect, which is actually Kostel dialect. In reality, speakers in Croatia self-identify themselves as speaking Croatian, which is a result of a ten centuries old country border passing through the dialects since the Francia. In addition, two dialects situated in Slovene (and the speakers self identify as speaking Slovene) did not evolve from Slovene (left out in the map on the right). The Čičarija dialect is a Chakavian dialect and parts of White Carniola were populated by Serbs during the Turkish invasion and therefore Shtokavian is spoken there.

Spoken Slovene is often considered to have at least 48 dialects (narečja) and 13 subdialects (podnarečja). The exact number of dialects is open to debate, ranging from as many as 50 to merely 7. According to the official chart, published by the Fran Ramovš Institute, there are 48 dialects and 13 subdialects, but that includes all dialects spoken in Slovene. Čičarija dialect is included as a separate dialect and Shtokavian in White Carniola is merged with South White Carniolan. However, the official chart was not updated to include Čabar dialect, which was only recently been discovered to have evolved differently than Kostel dialect, under which it was traditionally listed. Therefore, that division includes 48 dialects and 13 subdialects.

The various dialects are so different from each other that a speaker of one dialect may have a very difficult time understanding a speaker of another, particularly if they belong to different regional groups. Speakers of dialects that strongly differ accommodate each other by gravitating toward standard Slovene. The only exception to that is the Resian dialect, which is the most isolated dialect, and on top of that, the speakers were never able to attend Slovene schools and are therefore completely unfamiliar with Standard Slovene.

Slovene dialects are part of the South Slavic dialect continuum, transitioning into Croatian Kajkavian dialect to the southeast and Chakavian dialect to the southwest, but also bordering Friulian and Italian to the west, German to the north, and Hungarian to the northeast. The dialects are spoken primarily in Slovenia, but are extending in all neighboring countries Austria, Italy, Croatia, and Hungary.

== History of research ==
Primož Trubar, the author of the first Slovene book has already been aware of the wide diversity among the Slovene speakers and has written that some speakers might have a hard time understanding the book. First attempt to classify the dialects was made in 1809 by Jernej Kopitar, writing about two dialects in his Grammatik der slavischen Sprache in Krain, Kärnten und Steyermark. He split the dialects into two groups depending if their pronunciation of *ła is wa or la. Fran Miklosich similarly split the language in two dialects, but focusing on the pronunciation of Proto-Slavic ě. In the western dialect, it is pronounced ie and ei̯ in the eastern. Vatroslav Oblak split the two dialects by the evolution of long *ъ and *ь, which divided Slovene into the southwestern dialect where they evolved to a and northeastern dialect where they evolved to e. This division was completely contradictory to Miklosich's one, so a conclusion that not enough data was gathered was reached.

Karel Glaser has made further divisions in 1898, dividing the varieties into the southeastern and northwestern dialect group, which were then subdivided into the Hungarian (now known as Panonian), Kajkavian (which he considered to be a Slovene dialect), other Styrian, Carinthian, Upper Carniolan, Lower Carniolan, Karst-Littoral, and Venetian dialects (now joined together as the Littoral dialect group) and was thus the first more serious attempt to classify the dialects.

Other attempts to classify the language were made by Izmail Sreznevsky in the early 19th century, followed by Jan Niecisław Baudouin de Courtenay (focusing on Resia, Venetian Slovenia, Cerkno, and Bled), Karel Štrekelj (focusing on the Karst), and Ivan Scheinig (focusing on Carinthia). This was followed by efforts by Ivan Grafenauer (Gail Valley), Josip Tominšek (Savinja Valley), and others.

Efforts before the Second World War were spearheaded by Lucien Tesnière, Fran Ramovš (which added the Rovte dialect group), and Aleksander Isachenko, and after the war by Tine Logar and Jakob Rigler (sl), which both made vital corrections to the Ramovš division. Eventually, the classification proposed by Ramovš was accepted with corrections and additions by Logar and Rigler, published in 1983 as the Karta slovenskih narečij (Map of Slovenian Dialects).

Before the 21st century, it was known that Čičarija dialect was Chakavian, but it was only then discovered that the national borders also do not follow the Slovene–Serbo-Croatian border elsewhere. These changes are mostly accepted in Slovene and international literature, but not in Croatian, mainly because of the different institutes researching both countries and the speakers' self-identification.

== Evolution ==
All Slovene dialects originate from Old Slovene (also referred to as Alpine Slovene), present around 1000–1200. Alpine Slovene itself was formed from two transitional languages, Northwestern and Southeastern Alpine Slavic, which existed in 800–1000, when they both transitioned to Slovene.

=== Unification ===
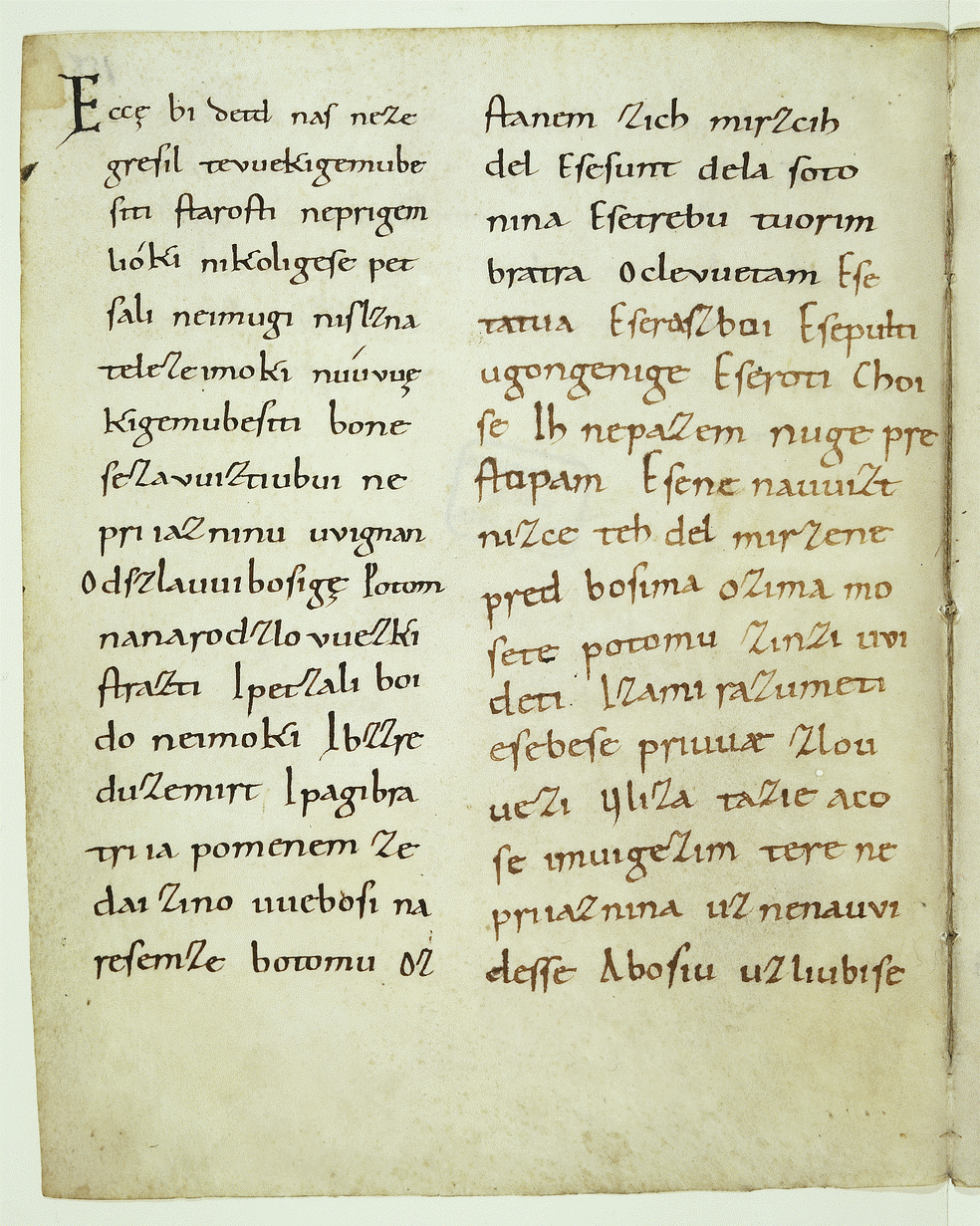
The Freising manuscripts, written in Alpine Slavic

Northwestern Alpine Slavic formed in what is today southern Austria and eastern Italy and was initially showing signs of it actually being a West Slavic language, but the Southeastern was closer to Western Kajkavian and Chakavian, and was actually derived from the Southwestern Alpine-Western Panonian-Littoral South Slavic, from which Western Kajkavian and Chakavian were also formed. They already featured some changes: In southeastern Alpine Slovene, *tl, *dl, *tn, and *dn got simplified into *l, *l, *n, and *n, respectively (PS *modliti (sę) "to pray, to beg", NWAS modliti (sę), SEAS moliti (sę), SS molíti). Proto-Slavic *vy- and *jьz-, both meaning "from" did not both exist in Alpine Slavic anymore. Northwestern Alpine Slavic kept the *vy- while the Southeastern kept the other one (PS *vy-bьrati / *jьz-bьrati "to choose", NWAS *vy-brati, SEAS *iz-brati, SS izbráti).

Both forms then followed the same changes which then separated Slovene from other languages.

- Long and short circumflex vowels in words composed of (in the time of the transition) two or more syllables was moved to the following syllable, and lengthened (AS sě̑no "hay", Old Slovene *sěnȏ; AS prȍso "oat", OS *prosȏ).
- The short final acute syllable became unstressed: PS *(V̄̆)V̄V̍ / *V̄V̀ъ̯ / ь̯, AS *(V̆)V̄V̀, OS *(V̆)V́V, for example PS *gně̄zdo̍ "nest", OS *gně́zdo.
- All remaining unstressed long vowels became short.
- Stressed vowels became tense, lengthened, and consequently raised, and because of that they tend to diphthongize.
- Unstressed vowels were spoken loosely, because of which some get reduced in some dialects.

The last common language of the Slovenes, also called Alpine Slavic or Alpine Slovene (around 1200) had the following vowels:

Vowels
	Front	Central	Back
Close	*i		*u
Close-mid	*e	*ə	*o
Open-mid	*ę	*ə	*ǫ
Near-open	*ě		
Open		*a	

All vowels could be long or short, stressed or unstressed. The Proto-Slavic vowel *y merged with *i. Additionally, there were also two syllabic sonorants, *r̥ and *ł̥, which formed from Proto-Slavic *CьrC / *CъrC, and *CьlC / *CъlC, respectively. It is however debated what *ě was actually like. It might have sounded like *[ä] (like displayed above) or like *[ẹ].

The language also had the following consonants:

Consonants
		Labial	Dental/ Alveolar	Postalveolar	Palatal/ Palatalized	Dorsal
Nasal		*m	*n		*ń	
Plosive	voiceless	*p	*t		*t'	*k
Plosive	voiced	*b	*d			*g
Affricate			*c	*č		
Fricative	voiceless	*f	*s	*š		*h
Fricative	voiced		*z	*ž		
Approximant		*w	*l		*l' / *i̯	*ł
Flap			*r		*ŕ	

Notes:

- The labiodental fricative */f/ was rare and only appeared in loanwords.
- *[ł] was an allophone of */l/ before a consonant, before a pause, or before the back vowels.

=== Fragmentation ===
The language then very quickly split into two dialects, splitting almost entirely along the former Northwestern Alpine Slavic–Southeastern Alpine Slavic isogloss. The dialects then divided further into the northern, western, southern, and eastern dialect. After that, the dialects fragmented further, mostly influenced by geographical features and contact with other dialects and languages.

In northwestern dialect, *ę and *ǫ stayed the same, while in the southeastern dialect, both were denasalized and first turned into *ä and *å, and then into *ȩ and *o̧. The nasal still exists only in Jaun Valley dialect, but other have so-called rinezem 'rhinism', in which the nasal vowel turns into a denasalized vowel and a nasal consonant; e.g., PS *mě̋sęcь "month", Gail Valley mẹ̑senc, SS mẹ̑sec.

The yat (*ě) was pronounced as a near-open vowel *ä in the northwestern dialect and then evolved first to and *ȩ then to *a and it was pronounced as *ẹ in the southern dialect, which then evolved into *i The long yat (*ě̄), however, diphthongized into *ie in the northwestern and into the *ei̯ in the southeastern. Similarly, ō also diphthongized into *uo and *ou̯, respectively.

The southeastern dialect also rounded the *a into *å and (partially) centralized *u into a vowel that was noted with *u̇ (but not to be confused with the Ramovš u̇).

Comparison of northwestern and southeastern Slovene dialects
Proto-Slavic	Old Slovene	NW dialect	SE dialect	Standard Slovene	Meaning
*pę̑tь	*pę̑t	*pę̑t	*pȩ̑t	pẹ̑t	'five'
*mǫ̑žь	*mǫž	*mǫž	*mȏ̧ž	mọ̑ž	'husband'
*děvi̋ca	*děvìca	*dȩvìca > *davìca	*dẹvìca > *divìca	devíca	'virgin'
*stěna̍	*stě́na	*stiéna	*stéi̯na	stẹ́na	'wall'
*mȏldostь	*mladȏst	*mladȗost	*mladȏust	mladọ̑st	'youth'
*ža̋ba	*žàba	*žàba	*žå̀bå	žába	'frog'
*sȗxь	*sȗx	*sȗx	*su̇̑x	sȗh	'dry'

The dialects then in 13th and 14 century further subdivided depending on how short acute vowels and *ə̄ evolved. In the non-final syllables, all short vowels were turned into long acute vowels, except in eastern dialect. Northern Styrian dialect (which formed from the southern dialect), did not lengthen the vowels in syllables that were followed by two other. The short vowels in the last syllable evolved into short circumflex vowels in all dialects. The *ə̄ evolved into *a in west and most of the south dialect, but evolved into *e in the 14th century. This change happened after the lengthening, so it also affected those vowels.

Proto-Slavic	Old Slovene	N dialect	W dialect	S dialect	E dialect	Standard Slovene	Meaning
*vőrna	*vràna	*vrána	*vrána	*vrána	*vràna	vrána	'crow'
*mali̋na	*malìna	*malína	*malína	*malína	*malìna	malína	'raspberry'
*dě̋lati	*dě̀lati	*dě́lati	*dě́lati	*dě̀lati	*dě̀lati	dẹ́lati	'to work'
*ra̋kъ	*ràk	*rȁk	*rȁk	*rȁk	*rȁk	rȁk	'cancer; crab'
*dь̏nь	*də̑n	*dȃn	*dȃn	*dȇn	*dȇn	dȃn	'day'
*pь̀sь̍jьjь	*pə̀sji	*pə́sji > *pásji	*pə́sji > *pásji	*pə́sji > *pésji	*pə̀sji	pásji	'dogged'
*sъ̀xne̍te	*sə̀xnete	*sə́xnete > *sáxnete	*sə́xnete > *sáxnete	*sə̀xnete	*sə̀xnete	sáhnete	'(you) disappear'
*pь̀sъ̍	*pə̀s	*pə̏s	*pə̏s	*pə̏s	*pə̏s	pə̏s	'dog'

==== Formation of dialects ====
From that, dialect bases formed. The northern dialect evolved into the Carinthian base, the predecessor of dialects in Carinthian dialect group and Resian dialect. The Western dialect evolved into two dialect bases: The Venetian-Karst base and the Soča–Idrija base, which evolved into northern Littoral and western Rovte dialects. The eastern dialect was the predecessor to Northern Styrian and Panonian bases; however, the southern dialect evolved into three bases: Southern Styrian, Lower Carniolan, and Upper Carniolan, which, apart from the eponyomous dialects, also evolved into southern Littoral dialects. At that time, many changes occurred which were not connected to the history of the dialect but more to the region where the dialects were spoken.

==== Consonants ====
Parallel to the vowel changes, consonants also evolved, however not as much. The changes were the following:

- */t'/ has in all dialects evolved into /ć/, in most also to /č/, and in some also to /c/.
- */g/ has in many dialects quickly turned into /ɣ/, which then turned to a voiced or voiceless /h/ in some dialects, or even disappeared altogether. */k/ also turned to /q/ in some Carinthian dialects.
- */b/ and */d/ turned into spirantized /ƀ/ and /đ/.
- */x/ disappeared in some dialects.
- */c/ and */č/, */s/ and */š/, and */z/, and */ž/ turned in some dialects into the same sound, /ċ/, /ṡ/, and /ż/, respectively.
- Sonorant */w/ turned into /v/ (IPA /ʋ/) before vowels in most Slovene dialects and to /u̯/ before a break or a consonant. In some dialects, it turned into the non-sononorant /v/ (IPA /v/) and, like all other non-sonorants, has a voiceless version /f/, used before the pause or another voiceless consonant.
- */r/ has in some dialects turned into /ṙ/.
- The palatal consonants evolved each differently:
  - */ŕ/ did not remain in any Slovene dialect. It either turned to /r/ in any position or to /r/ + /j/ in some positions.
  - */ń/ either stayed like that, or turned into /j/ + /n/, /j̃/, /j/, but only rarely into /n/, especially before vowels.
  - */l'/ either stayed like that, or turned into /j/ + /l/, /l/, or /j/.
- Some consonants got palatalized again before the front vowels. The dorsal non-sonorants also got simplified further:
  - */k'/ turned into /t'/, or further into /č/.
  - */g'/ turned into /d'/, and then universally into /j/.
  - */x'/ turned into /ś/, or further into /š/.
  - The consonants rarely also broke into /j/ + /k/, /j/ + /g/, and /j/ + /x/
- */i̯/ tends to disappear in front of vowels. In eastern dialects, it has evolved into /j/, or even further into /d'/, or /ǯ́/.
- *[ł] mostly turned into [u̯] before a pause or a consonant. Before the back vowels, it either stayed the same, or turned into [w] / [v], or [l]. In some dialects, it turned into a phoneme.

==== Accent shifts ====
There were many accent shifts and other changes that did not happen in all dialects. Only the shifts *sě̑no / prȍso > *sěnȏ / prosȏ and *svě̄t́à > *svě́t́a happened in all dialects, but others that happened later did not encompass all of them. The first happened in the 15th century, which moved the stress from the circumflex short open or closed final syllable to the preceding mid short syllable (*e or *o), turning it acute doing that (e. g. *ženȁ > *žèna). This change happened in most of the dialects (except a part of Rosen Valley, Resian, Torre Valley, Natisone Valley, and the southern part of Soča dialect), but many of them have lengthened the vowel into a long one. Another shift that happened in most dialects in the 17th century was the shift from the circumflex short open or closed final syllable to the preceding extra-short syllable (*ə) and also turning it acute (e. g. *məglȁ > *mə̀gla). This change did not happen where the *ženȁ > *žèna did not happen, but also in Upper Carniolan dialect group and Lower Carniolan dialect. Therefore, in Standard Slovene, both accents are allowed, but favoring the unshifted one.

Other shifts that happened in fewer dialects were:

- From short circumflex closed final syllables to the preceding syllable, turning it acute (*pijȁn > *pìjan), which happened in some Littoral, Rovte, Styrian, and Lower Carniolan dialects in the 18th century.
- From short circumflex closed final syllables to a vowel two syllables in a word before, turning it acute (*ropotȁt > *ròpotat), which happened in Karst, Inner Carniolan, Istrian, and in part Kostel dialect.
- From long circumflex syllable to a preceding syllable, shortening and turning it acute (*sěnȏ > *sě̀no), which happened in many, not closely related and geographically separate dialects from the 18th century onwards.
- From long acute syllable to a preceding syllable while also shortening the vowel (*kováč > *kòvač), which happened in Kostel and North White Carniolan dialects.
- From short acute first syllable in words with three syllables to a following syllable (*bàbica > *babìca), which happened in a part of Rosen Valley, Jaun Valley, Mežica, North Pohorje-Remšnik, Upper Savinja, Kozjak subdialect, and a part of Torre Valley dialect.
- From long acute first syllable in words with two syllables to a following syllable, but the destressed vowel is still long and the new vowel is short and circumflex (*zíma > *zīmȁ), which happened in a part of Torre Valley dialect.

== Classification ==
Dialects can be classified in two ways. The most common is the horizontal division, which groups dialects by how they sound today, but there is also the vertical division, which classifies the dialects by how they evolved. Therefore, the criteria for vertical division are mostly the older changes (listed above) and younger for the horizontal division. The groups of dialects in horizontal division are called "dialect groups" (Slovene: narečne skupine or narečne baze) and those in vertical division are called "dialect bases" (Slovene: narečne ploskve).

The dialects can also have several subdialects (Slovene: podnarečja), and are further divided into microdialects (Slovene: govori, lit. speeches).

=== Horizontal division ===
Horizontal division used today is a refined version of division proposed by Ramovš in 1935. He grouped the dialects by the general sound and feel of the dialect, as many Slovenes similarly divided the dialects prior to proper research.

He grouped the dialects into eight distinct groups: The Carinthian, Littoral, Rovte, Upper Carniolan, Lower Carniolan, Styrian, Pannonian, and Mixed Kočevje dialects, which he did not even research. According to the now official chart, the only change is the inclusion of Mixed Kočevje dialects into the Lower Carniolan group:

1. The Carinthian dialect group (koroška narečna skupina): spoken by Carinthian Slovenes in Austria, in Slovenian Carinthia, and in the northwestern parts of Slovenian Styria along the upper Drava Valley, and in the westernmost areas of Upper Carniola on the border with Italy. Among other features, this group is characterized by late denasalization of *ę and *ǫ, diphthongization of long yat into a close vowel and open reflex of short yat, lengthening of old acute syllables and short neo-acute syllables, and an e-like reflex of the long *ə and ə-like reflex of the short *ə.
2. The Littoral dialect group (primorska narečna skupina), spoken in most of the Slovenian Littoral (except for the area around Tolmin and Cerkno, where Rovte dialects are spoken) and in the western part of Inner Carniola; it is also spoken by Slovenes in the Italian provinces of Trieste and Gorizia, and in the mountainous areas of eastern Friuli (Venetian Slovenia and Resia). This group includes very heterogeneous dialects. Among other features, it is characterized by diphthongization of yat > *ie and *o > *uo, which were also borrowed by southern dialect. The western dialects in this group have preserved pitch accent whereas the others have a non-tonal stress accent and some do not even differentiate between long and short vowels.
3. The Rovte dialect group (rovtarska narečna skupina), spoken in the mountainous areas of west-central Slovenia, on the border between the Slovenian Littoral, Upper Carniola, and Inner Carniola, in a triangle between the towns of Tolmin, Škofja Loka, and Vrhnika. Among other features, this group is characterized by shortening of long diphthongal *ie and *uo, akanye, and general development of *g to [ɣ].
4. The Upper Carniolan dialect group (gorenjska narečna skupina), spoken in most of Upper Carniola and in Ljubljana. Among other features, this group is characterized by monophthongal stressed vowels, an acute semivowel, pitch accent, standard circumflex shift, and two accentual retractions with some exceptions. It features narrowing of *o and *e in preaccentual position, akanye (reduction of *o to a) in postaccentual position, and strong syncope. There is a partial development of *g to [ɣ], preservation of bilabial *w, and general hardening of soft *l' and *ń.
5. The Lower Carniolan dialect group (dolenjska narečna skupina), spoken in most of Lower Carniola and in the eastern half of Inner Carniola. Among other features, this group is characterized by pitch accent, extensive diphththongization (ei̯, ie, ou̯), an a-colored *ə, shift of *o > u, and partial akanye.
6. The Styrian dialect group (štajerska narečna skupina), spoken in central and eastern Slovenian Styria and in the Lower Sava Valley and Central Sava Valley. Among other features, this group is characterized by loss of pitch accent, tonemically high and lengthened accented syllables, lengthening of accented short syllables, and frequent development of *a > o̧, and *u > ü in the eastern part of the territory.
7. The Pannonian dialect group (panonska narečna skupina), or northeastern dialect group, spoken in northeastern Slovenia (Prekmurje, in the eastern areas of Slovenian Styria), and among the Hungarian Slovenes. Among other features, this group is characterized by loss of pitch accent, non-lengthened short syllables, and a new acute on short syllables.

The horizontal division is in professional literature based on various non-linguistic and linguistic factors. Non-linguistic factors include settlement patterns and geographical features (rivers, mountains) that helped shape various isoglosses. Linguistic factors include language contact with non-Slavic languages to some extent, phonological and prosodic elements in particular, and to a lesser extent word-formational, lexical, and inflectional elements. Specifically, the primary distinguishing linguistic features are preservation or loss of pitch accent, reflexes of nasal *ę, nasal *ǫ, yat (ě), and the yers (ъ, ь), but also (to a lesser extent) vowel inventory, diphthongization, and degree and type of vowel reduction.

=== Vertical division ===

The dialects can be split into eight dialect bases that formed from the 15th century onward, emerging from the four dialects. The bases are:

- Northwestern dialect
  - Northern dialect
    - Carinthian dialect base (koroška narečna ploskev), which evolved into Carinthian dialects and into Resian dialect in the Littoral dialect group.
  - Western dialect
    - Venetian-Karst dialect base (beneško-kraška narečna ploskev), which evolved into Natisone and Torre Valley dialects, Brda dialect, and Karst dialect in the Littoral dialect group.
    - Soča-Idrija dialect base (obsoško-idrijska narečna ploskev), which evolved into Soča dialect in the Littoral dialect group and into Tolmin, Cerkno, and Črni Vrh dialects, which are in Rovte dialect group.
- Southeastern dialect
  - Southern dialect
    - Upper Carniolan dialect base (gorenjska narečna ploskev), which evolved into Upper Carniolan dialects, as well as Horjul, Škofja Loka, and Poljane dialects in Rovte dialect group.
    - Lower Carniolan dialect base (dolenjska narečna ploskev), which evolved into Lower Carniolan dialects, but also Inner Carniolan and Istrian dialects in Littoral dialect group and the Lower Sava Valley dialect in Styrian dialect group.
    - Southern Styrian dialect base (južnoštajerska narečna ploskev), which evolved into Central Styrian, Kozje-Bizeljsko, and Central Savinja dialects in Styrian dialect group.
  - Eastern dialect
    - Northern Styrian dialect base (severnoštajerska narečna ploskev), which evolved into South Pohorje, and Upper Savinja dialects in Styrian dialect group.
    - Pannonian dialect base (panonska narečna ploskev), which evolved into Pannonian dialects.

== List of dialects ==
The following grouping of dialects and subdialects is based on the official map of Slovene dialects by Fran Ramovš, Tine Logar, and Jakob Rigler (sl) (from which the first Slovene term listed in parentheses is taken), with additions of Matej Šekli and other sources.

Dialects.

- Carinthian dialect group (koroška narečna skupina, koroščina):
  - North Pohorje–Remšnik dialect (severnopohorsko-remšniško narečje) (Slovenia) (Austria)
  - Mežica dialect (mežiško narečje, mežiščina) (Slovenia)
  - Jaun Valley dialect (podjunsko narečje, podjunščina) (Austria) (Slovenia)
  - Ebriach dialect (obirsko narečje, obirščina) (Austria)
  - Rosen Valley dialect (rožansko narečje, rožanščina) (Austria)
  - Gail Valley dialect (ziljsko narečje, ziljščina) (Austria) (Italy) (Slovenia)
    - Kranjska Gora subdialect (kranjskogorsko podnarečje) (Slovenia)
- Littoral dialect group (primorska narečna skupina):
  - Resia(n) dialect (rezijansko narečje, rezijanščina) (Italy)
  - Soča dialect (obsoško narečje) (Slovenia)
  - Torre Valley dialect (tersko narečje, terščina) (Italy) (Slovenia)
  - Natisone Valley dialect (nadiško narečje, nadiščina) (Italy) (Slovenia)
  - Brda dialect (briško narečje, briščina) (Slovenia) (Italy)
  - Karst dialect (kraško narečje, kraščina) (Slovenia) (Italy)
    - Banjšice subdialect (banjško podnarečje, banjiško podnarečje) (Slovenia)
  - Istrian dialect (istrsko narečje, istrščina) (Slovenia) (Italy) (Croatia)
    - Rižana subdialect (rižansko podnarečje) (Slovenia) (Italy)
    - Šavrin Hills subdialect (šavrinsko podnarečje, šavrinščina) (Slovenia) (Croatia)
  - Inner Carniolan dialect (notranjsko narečje, notranjščina) (Slovenia) (Italy)
- Rovte dialect group (rovtarska narečna skupina, rovtarščina):
  - Tolmin dialect (tolminsko narečje, tolminščina) (Slovenia)
    - Bača subdialect (baško podnarečje) (Slovenia)
  - Cerkno dialect (cerkljansko narečje, cerkljanščina) (Slovenia)
  - Poljane dialect (poljansko narečje, poljanščina) (Slovenia)
  - Škofja Loka dialect (škofjeloško narečje, škofjeloščina) (Slovenia)
  - Črni Vrh dialect (črnovrško narečje, črnovrščina) (Slovenia)
  - Horjul dialect (horjulsko narečje, horjulščina) (Slovenia)
- Upper Carniolan dialect group (gorenjska narečna skupina):
  - Upper Carniolan dialect (gorenjsko narečje, gorenjščina) (Slovenia)
    - Eastern Upper Carniolan subdialect (vzhodnogorenjsko podnarečje, vzhodna gorenjščina) (Slovenia)
  - Selca dialect (selško narečje, selščina) (Slovenia)
- Lower Carniolan dialect group (dolenjska narečna skupina):
  - Lower Carniolan dialect (dolenjsko narečje, dolenjščina) (Slovenia)
    - Eastern Lower Carniolan subdialect (vzhodnodolenjsko podnarečje, vzhodna dolenjščina) (Slovenia)
  - North White Carniolan dialect (severnobelokranjsko narečje) (Slovenia)
  - South White Carniolan dialect (južnobelokranjsko narečje, južna belokranjščina) (Slovenia)
  - Čabranka dialect (čabranško narečje, čebranško narečje) (Croatia) (Slovenia)
  - Kostel dialect (kostelsko narečje, kostelska belokranjščina, kostelščina) (Croatia) (Slovenia)
  - Mixed Kočevje subdialects (mešani kočevski govori) (Slovenia)
- Styrian dialect group (štajerska narečna skupina, štajerščina):
  - Central Savinja dialect (srednjesavinjsko narečje, srednja savinjščina) (Slovenia)
  - Upper Savinja dialect (zgornjesavinjsko narečje, zgornja savinjščina) (Slovenia)
    - Solčava subdialect (solčavsko podnarečje) (Slovenia)
  - Central Styrian dialect (srednještajersko narečje, osrednja štajerščina) (Slovenia) (Croatia)
  - South Pohorje dialect (južnopohorsko narečje, štajerska pohorščina) (Slovenia) (Austria)
    - Kozjak subdialect (kozjaško podnarečje) (Slovenia) (Austria)
  - Kozje-Bizeljsko dialect (kozjansko-bizeljsko narečje) (Slovenia) (Croatia)
  - Lower Sava Valley dialect (posavsko narečje, posavščina) (Slovenia)
    - Zagorje-Trbovlje subdialect (zagorsko-trboveljsko podnarečje) (Slovenia)
    - Laško subdialect (laško podnarečje) (Slovenia)
    - Sevnica-Krško subdialect (sevniško-krško podnarečje) (Slovenia)
- Pannonian dialect group (panonska narečna skupina):
  - Prekmurje Slovene (prekmursko narečje, prekmurščina) (Slovenia) (Hungary) (Austria) ( (Croatia) )
  - Slovenian Hills dialect (goričansko narečje, slovenskogoriško narečje, goričanščina) (Slovenia)
  - Prlekija dialect (prleško narečje, prleščina) (Slovenia) (Croatia)
  - Haloze dialect (haloško narečje, haloščina) (Slovenia)

== See also ==
- The official chart of Slovene dialects and other Slavic dialects spoken in Slovenia (in Slovene)
- Interactive chart of Slovene dialects and other Slavic dialects spoken in Slovenia with audio examples (in Slovene)

== Bibliography ==
- Logar, Tine (1996). Kenda-Jež, Karmen (ed.). Dialektološke in jezikovnozgodovinske razprave [Dialectological and etymological discussions] (in Slovenian). Ljubljana: Znanstvenoraziskovalni center SAZU, Inštitut za slovenski jezik Frana Ramovša. ISBN 961-6182-18-8.
- Ramovš, Fran (1935). Historična gramatika slovenskega jezika [Historical grammar of the Sloene language]. VII. Dialekti (in Slovenian). Ljubljana: Znanstveno društvo za humanistične vede v Ljubljani.
- Ramovš, Fran (1995). Likar, Vojo (ed.). Kratka zgodovina slovenskega jezika I [A short history of Slovene language I] (in Slovenian) (reprint ed.). Ljubljana: Znanstvenoraziskovalni center SAZU. ISBN 961-90125-9-3.
- Šekli, Matej (2018). Legan Ravnikar, Andreja (ed.). Topologija lingvogenez slovanskih jezikov. Collection Linguistica et philologica (in Slovenian). Translated by Plotnikova, Anastasija. Ljubljana: Znanstvenoraziskovalni center SAZU. ISBN 978-961-05-0137-4.
- Toporišič, Jože (1992). Enciklopedija slovenskega jezika [Encyclopædia of the Slovene language] (in Slovenian). Ljubljana: Cankarjeva založba. ISBN 961-6182-18-8.
