= Cerkno dialect =

Dialect of Slovene

The Cerkno dialect (Slovene: cerkljansko narečje, cerkljanščina) is a Slovene dialect in the Rovte dialect group. It is spoken mostly in the municipalities of Cerkno and Idrija in western Slovenia. Unlike many other dialects from the same dialect group, which have suffered a loss in the number of speakers due to emigration and urbanization, the Cerkno dialect remains widely spoken and it is recognized in the wider Slovenian Littoral region for its distinctive phonetic features.

== Geographical extension ==
It is spoken in the watersheds of the Trebuščica, Kanomljica, Idrijca (from Idrija to beyond Dolenja Trebuša), and Cerknica rivers. In addition to Idrija and Dolenja Trebuša, it includes the settlements of Cerkno, Šentviška Gora, Gorenji Novaki, Dolenji Novaki, Vojsko, Otalež, and Spodnja Idrija.

== Phonological and morphological characteristics ==
The Cerkno dialect lacks pitch accent. The dialect has complete akanye, prominent quantitative contrasts between accented long and short vowels, shortened diphthongs, innovative Slovenian palatalization of k, g, h (e.g., ščìera < sekira 'axe'), and fronting of a > e. It has undergone the lenition of g > [ɦ], long yat > i, short ə > ò, w > j before e and i, and short accented i > è and u > ò. Final -b > p^{h}/f and final -d > t^{h}/t. Soft l > (j)l, soft n > (j)n, and hard l > Ø.

== Other ==
The Slovenian singer-songwriter Iztok Mlakar has performed several songs in this dialect ("Pubi usidma se," "Var se čeča," "Očenaš").
