= Poljane dialect =

Slovene dialect

The Poljane dialect (Slovene: poljansko narečje, poljanščina) is a Slovene dialect in the Rovte dialect group. It is spoken in the watershed of the Poljane Sora River (Slovene: Poljanska Sora, also Poljanščica) almost as far east as a line from Mount Lubnik (1,025 meters or 3,363 feet) near Škofja Loka to Črni Vrh. Major settlements in the area include Žiri, Sovodenj, Gorenja Vas, Javorje, Poljane nad Škofjo Loko, Lučine, and Šentjošt nad Horjulom.

== Phonological and morphological characteristics ==
The Poljane dialect lacks pitch accent. An unusual feature of the dialect is that stress is retracted from originally circumflex long vowels and remaining short accented vowels, resulting in newly accented short vowels and unaccented vowels that retain their original length. The dialect has developed two semivowels, now expressed as e and o. In the Žiri area a new pitch accent has developed.
