= Laško subdialect =

Subdialect of Slovene

The Laško subdialect (laški govor) is a Slovene subdialect in the Styrian dialect group. It is a subdialect of the Lower Sava Valley dialect, extending from east of Zidani Most nearly to Jurklošter, and in the areas of Rimske Toplice and Laško.

== Phonological and morphological characteristics ==
The Laško subdialect exhibits strong Styrian features. The subdialect is characterized by loss of pitch accent, development of close diphthongal ie from old acute nasal *ę and neoacute etymological e and close diphthongal uo from old long and old acute nasal *ǫ and neoacute etymological o. Masculine genitive -ov has developed into -u, as has the neuter nominative adjectival ending -o. The vowel a has developed a ə-like character in prepositions and prefixes derived from prepositions. Final -o and -e in neuter nouns has been lost, transforming these into masculine nouns that now follow the masculine declension pattern. The cluster šč has been reduced to š and homorganic dental clusters have dissimilated to velar-dental clusters (e.g., dn > gn, tl > kl). Morphologically, there has been contamination between present-tense verbs in -im and -em.
