= Kranjska Gora subdialect =

Subdialect of Slovene

The Kranjska Gora subdialect (Slovene: kranjskogorski govor, kranjskogorsko podnarečje) is a Slovene subdialect of the Gail Valley dialect in the Carinthian dialect group. It was included among the Carinthian dialects by Tine Logar and Jakob Rigler (sl) in contrast to its earlier classification by Fran Ramovš as an Upper Carniolan dialect.

== Phonological and morphological characteristics ==
The Kranjska Gora subdialect is characterized by open e and o as reflexes of nasal *ę and nasal *ǫ, development of long ə > e instead of a (e.g., ves 'village'; cf. standard Slovene vas), akanye, final -i > close -e, retention of soft ľ and ń, k > ť or tj before front vowels, both long and short infinitive forms, and the verbal thematic vowel -i- > -e-.
