= Planina pri Sevnici =

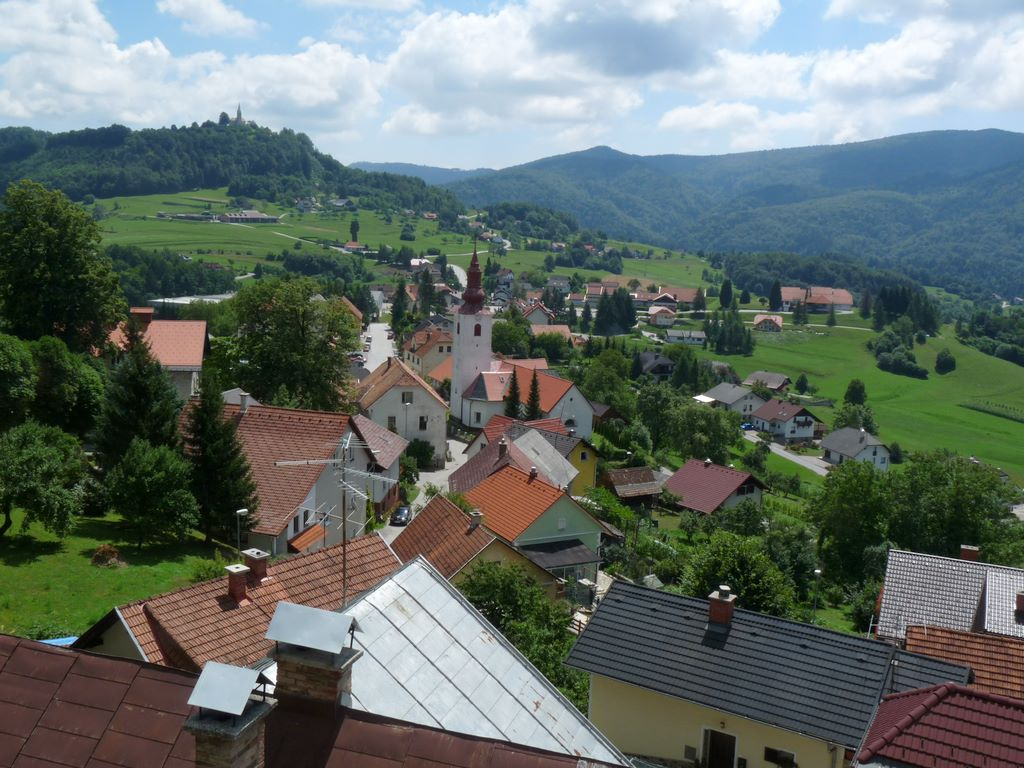

- Location in Slovenia
- Coordinates: 46°6′20.52″N 15°24′31.99″E
- Country: Slovenia
- Traditional region: Styria
- Statistical region: Savinja
- Municipality: Šentjur

Area
  - Total: 2.85 km^{2} (1.10 sq mi)
- Elevation: 532.5 m (1,747 ft)

Population (2020)
  - Total: 407
  - Density: 143/km^{2} (370/sq mi)

Planina pri Sevnici (pronounced [plaˈnìːna pɾi ˈséːwnitsi]) is a village, one of the most populous settlements in the Municipality of Šentjur, eastern Slovenia. The settlement, and the entire municipality, are included in the Savinja Statistical Region, which is in the Slovenian portion of the historical Duchy of Styria.

The local parish church is dedicated to Saint Margaret and belongs to the Roman Catholic Diocese of Celje. It is a 15th-century building, extended in around 1700. Above the settlement are the ruins of a 12th-century castle, abandoned in 1884.
