= Styrian dialect group =

Group of dialects of Slovene

Map of regional groups of Slovene dialects Styrian

The Styrian dialect group (štajerska narečna skupina, štajerščina) is a group of closely related dialects of Slovene. The Lower Carniolan dialects are spoken in central and eastern Slovenian Styria and in the Lower Sava Valley and Central Sava Valley.

== Phonological and morphological characteristics ==
Among other features, this group is characterized by loss of pitch accent, tonemically high and lengthened accented syllables, lengthening of accented short syllables, and frequent development of a > ɔ, and u > ü in the eastern part of the territory.

== Individual dialects and subdialects ==
- Central Savinja dialect (srednjesavinjsko narečje, srednja savinjščina)
- Upper Savinja dialect (zgornjesavinjsko narečje, zgornja savinjščina)
  - Solčava subdialect (solčavski govor)
- Central Styrian dialect (srednještajersko narečje, osrednja štajerščina)
- South Pohorje dialect (južnopohorsko narečje, štajerska pohorščina)
  - Kozjak subdialect (kozjaški govor)
- Kozje-Bizeljsko dialect (kozjansko-bizeljsko narečje)
- Lower Sava Valley dialect (posavsko narečje, posavščina)
  - Zagorje-Trbovlje subdialect (zagorsko-trboveljski govor)
  - Laško subdialect (laški govor)
  - Sevnica-Krško subdialect (sevniško-krški govor)
