= Slovene Hills dialect =

Dialect of Slovene

The Slovene Hills dialect (Slovene: goričansko narečje, goričanščina) is a Slovene dialect in the Pannonian dialect group. It is spoken in the Slovene Hills (Slovene: Slovenske gorice) between the Drava and Mura rivers east of a line from Maribor to Šentilj v Slovenskih Goricah and west of a line from Radenci to Gradišče.

== Phonological and morphological characteristics ==
The Slovene Hills dialect features different reflexes of long etymological o and jat based on former tonemic differences, newly accented e is open, and r > ar. Neuter nouns have undergone feminization or masculinization, and plural locative and instrumental endings are typically characterized by an a vowel (e.g., -ah instead of -ih).
