= Carinthian dialect group =

Group of dialects of Slovene

Map of regional groups of Slovene dialects Carinthian

The Carinthian dialect group (koroška narečna skupina, koroščina) is a group of closely related dialects of Slovene, a South Slavic language. The Carinthian dialects are spoken by Carinthian Slovenes in Austria, in Slovenian Carinthia, and in the northwestern parts of Slovenian Styria along the upper Drava Valley, in the westernmost areas of Upper Carniola on the border with Italy, and in some villages in the Province of Udine in Italy.

== Phonological and morphological characteristics ==
Among other features, this group is characterized by late denasalization of *ę and *ǫ, a close reflex of long yat and open reflex of short yat, lengthening of old acute syllables and short neo-acute syllables, and an e-like reflex of the long semivowel and ə-like reflex of the short semivowel.

== Individual dialects and subdialects ==
- North Pohorje–Remšnik dialect (severnopohorsko-remšniško narečje)
- Mežica dialect (mežiško narečje, mežiščina)
- Jaun Valley dialect (podjunsko narečje, podjunščina) (Austria)
- Ebriach dialect (obirsko narečje, obirščina) (Austria)
- Rosen Valley dialect (rožansko narečje, rožanščina) (Austria)
- Gail Valley dialect (ziljsko narečje, ziljščina) (Austria, Italy)
  - Kranjska Gora subdialect (kranjskogorski govor)
