= Rovte dialect group =

Map of regional groups of Slovene dialects Rovte

The Rovte dialect group (rovtarska narečna skupina, rovtarščina) is a group of closely related dialects of Slovene. The Rovte dialects are spoken in the mountainous areas of west-central Slovenia, on the border between the Slovenian Littoral, Upper Carniola, and Inner Carniola, in a triangle between the towns of Tolmin, Škofja Loka, and Vrhnika.

== Phonological and morphological characteristics ==
Among other features, this group is characterized by shortening of long diphthongal ie and uo, akanye, and general development of g to [ɣ].

== Individual dialects and subdialects ==
- Tolmin dialect (tolminsko narečje, tolminščina)
  - Bača subdialect (baški govor)
- Cerkno dialect (cerkljansko narečje, cerkljanščina)
- Poljane dialect (poljansko narečje, poljanščina)
- Škofja Loka dialect (škofjeloško narečje, škofjeloščina)
- Črni Vrh dialect (črnovrško narečje, črnovrščina)
- Horjul dialect (horjulsko narečje, horjulščina)
