= Črni Vrh dialect =

Dialect of Slovene

The Črni Vrh dialect (Slovene: črnovrško narečje, črnovrščina) is a Slovene dialect in the Rovte dialect group. It is spoken in Črni Vrh, the upper Idrijca Valley, Hotedršica, and Rovte.

== Phonological and morphological characteristics ==
The Črni Vrh dialect lacks pitch accent. Its phonemic inventory contains soft consonants and it has voicing contrast in final position.
