= Tolmin dialect =

Dialect of Slovene

The Tolmin dialect (Slovene: tolminsko narečje, tolminščina) is a Slovene dialect in the Rovte dialect group. It is spoken in the watersheds of the Bača and lower Idrijca rivers, as well as the reaches of the Soča River in that area, bounded on the west by a line west of Tolmin and Most na Soči. Other settlements in the dialect area include Grahovo ob Bači.

== Phonological and morphological characteristics ==
The Tolmin dialect lacks pitch accent, except in Čiginj, where this is partially retained. It has short vowels resulting from accentual retraction of the type nàga < nogà 'foot', vowel reduction as in the central Slovene dialects, b < v (known as betacizem in Slovene), and innovative Slovenian palatalization (e.g., ščìra < sekira 'axe'). Long i and u have shortened, restricting the long vowel inventory to ie, uo, and a. The dialect has undergone complete akanye and the lenition of g > [ɦ].
