= Mežica dialect =

Dialect of Slovene

The Mežica dialect (Slovene: mežiško narečje, mežiščina) is a Slovene dialect in the Carinthian dialect group. It is spoken in the triangle bounded by Črna na Koroškem, Dravograd, and Mislinja. Major settlements in the dialect area are Slovenj Gradec, Ravne na Koroškem, Prevalje, and Mežica.

== Phonological and morphological characteristics ==
The Mežica dialect lacks pitch accent and has a large ratio between the length of accented and unaccented vowels. Mid vowels tend to become open (e.g., e > ε) but there is also some diphthong development (e.g., ě > ie, o > uo). The dialect underwent the Slovenian third accentual retraction, the feminine nominal instrumental singular ending is -oj, and the addition of š- before deictics in t- (e.g., štam for tam 'there'; known as štekanje in Slovene) is typical.
