= Ebriach dialect =

Dialect of Slovene

The Ebriach dialect (Slovene: obirsko narečje, obirščina) is a Slovene dialect in the Carinthian dialect group. It is spoken in Austrian Carinthia around Bad Eisenkappel, in the watershed of the Vellach River (Slovene: Bela) and Ebriach Creek (German: Ebriachbach, Slovene: Obirski potok), and Jezersko.

== Phonological and morphological characteristics ==
The Ebriach dialect has uvular stops in place of velars, it has close reflexes of the nasal vowels, and varying reflexes of the old acute and neoacute on short syllables. There has been accentual retraction from circumflected long vowels (e.g., vèčer vs. standard Slovene večér).
