= Upper Savinja dialect =

Dialect of Slovene

The Upper Savinja dialect (zgornjesavinjsko narečje, zgornja savinjščina) is a Slovene dialect in the Styrian dialect group. It is spoken in the upper Savinja Valley and along the Dreta River, extending eastwards to east of Mozirje and Nazarje, up to the Solčava subdialect northwest of Luče in Solčava and the Logar Valley. It includes the settlements of Ljubno, Luče, Gornji Grad, and Bočna.

== Phonological and morphological characteristics ==
The Upper Savinja dialect does not have pitch accent. It has a late lengthened acute, soft l and n, palatalization of consonants before (former) front vowels, and a very dark l.
