= Horjul dialect =

Dialect of Slovene

The Horjul dialect (Slovene: horjulsko narečje, horjulščina) is a Slovene dialect in the Rovte dialect group. It is spoken southwest of Ljubljana in the settlements of Horjul, Polhov Gradec, Log pri Brezovici, Vrhnika, Verd, Logatec, and Kalce.

== Phonological and morphological characteristics ==
The Horjul dialect mostly has pitch accent. It exhibits accentual retraction to ultra-short syllables. The diphthongs ie and ua are the result of newly accented formerly short vowels. There are two semivowels and extensive akanye in the dialect. Soft l is pronounced ľ and soft n as a nasalized j. The vowel i is frequent as a reflex of e or ə; the clusters tl and dl are preserved, but šč > š. The phoneme g has lenited to [ɦ]. Voicing contrast is preserved in final position. The dialect uses the short infinitive (without -i), and the verbal thematic vowel -i- has been replaced by -e-.
