= Tine Logar =

- Born: Valentin Logar; February 11, 1916; Horjul, Austria-Hungary
- Died: December 25, 2002 (aged 86); Ljubljana, Slovenia
- Education: University of Ljubljana
- Occupation: Linguist
- Employer: Slovenian Academy of Sciences and Arts
- Known for: Work on Slovenian dialectology

Valentin "Tine" Logar (11 February 1916 – December 25, 2002) was a Slovenian historical linguist, dialectologist, and university professor. He was best known for his works on Slovene dialects, published in Slovenska narečja (Slovenian Dialects, 1975) and Karta slovenskih narečij (Map of Slovenian Dialects, 1983).

He was born in the town of Horjul northwest of Ljubljana and started his scholarly career researching the dialect of his native area. He graduated from the University of Ljubljana in 1940. From 1947 to 1958 he worked at the Slovenian Academy of Sciences and Arts, with a hiatus from 1949 to 1950. This interruption occurred at the onset of the Informbiro period, when he was arrested and interned as a political prisoner by the Communist regime in the Goli Otok concentration camp and then served penal labor in the mines of Bosnia.

He died in Ljubljana.
