= South Pohorje dialect =

Dialect of Slovene

The South Pohorje dialect (južnopohorsko narečje, štajerska pohorščina) is a Slovene dialect in the Styrian dialect group. It is spoken south of the Drava River, starting east of Ruše and extending through Maribor to just before Zlatoličje, and extending as far south as the Slovenske Konjice area. It also includes the settlements of Rače, Spodnja Polskava (in part), Slovenska Bistrica, and Vitanje.

== Phonological and morphological characteristics ==
The South Pohorje dialect is characterized by a non-tonal stress accent with different reflexes of old long vowels and vowels with a neocircumflex accent. It has long diphthongs of the type ei and ou, a characteristic e pronunciation of the old semivowel, open pronunciation of newly accented e and o, an o pronunciation of long a, nasalized j and nj as reflexes of soft n, and ar for syllabic r. Some new nasalized vowels have developed. Neuter nouns have become feminine.
