= Central Styrian dialect =

Dialect of Slovene

The Central Styrian dialect (srednještajersko narečje, osrednja štajerščina) is a Slovene dialect in the Styrian dialect group. It is spoken in the watersheds of the Voglajna and upper Sotla rivers in the south and the Central Dravinja Valley in the north, extending from Štore in the west to Rogatec in the east, and from Spodnja Polskava and Pragersko in the north to Podčetrtek in the south.

== Phonological and morphological characteristics ==
The Central Styrian dialect is characterized by diphthongal reflexes of the high vowels (ii/ei, uu/ou) and close mid vowels (ei/ai, ou/au), lengthening of some short accented vowels, a stress accent, non-parallel reflexes of o and e (the latter being open), a > ɔ, ər > ar, v > f before voiceless consonants and in final position, and a small degree of vowel reduction. Final-syllable accent is morphologically unknown.
