= Upper Carniolan dialect =

Slovene dialect spoken in Upper Carniola

- Native to: Slovenia
- Region: Upper Carniola
- Ethnicity: Slovenes
- Language family: Indo-European: Balto-Slavic; Slavic; South Slavic; Western South Slavic; Slovene; Upper Carniolan dialect group; Upper Carniolan dialect
- Dialects: Eastern Upper Carniolan subdialect

Language codes
- ISO 639-3: –
- Upper Carniolan dialect

The Upper Carniolan dialect (Slovene: gorenjsko narečje [gɔˈɾèːnskɔ naˈɾéːt͡ʃjɛ], gorenjščina) is a major Slovene dialect, known for extensive syncope, monophthongization of diphthongs, and loss of neuter gender. It is spoken in most (but not all) of Upper Carniola, along the Sava River. It is one of the two central Slovene dialects and was also used as a written language from the 17th century onward, and especially in the second half of the 18th century. It borders the Selca, Škofja Loka, and Horjul dialects to the south, the Tolmin dialect to the southwest, the Soča dialect to the west, the Gail Valley dialect to the northwest, the Rosen Valley and Ebriach dialects to the north, the Upper Savinja dialect to the northeast, the Central Savinja dialect to the east, and the Lower Sava Valley and Lower Carniolan dialects to the southeast. The eastern part of the dialect is the Eastern Upper Carniolan subdialect. The dialect belongs to the Upper Carniolan dialect group, and it evolved from Upper Carniolan dialect base.

== Geographical distribution ==
The Upper Carniolan dialect is spoken in most of Upper Carniola, extending over the central area, but not in the northwesternmost part, where the Gail Valley dialect is spoken, the easternmost part, where Styrian dialects are spoken, as well as the entire southeastern part, where the Selca dialect and Rovte dialects are spoken. The area is therefore mostly limited to Upper Sava Valley, from Belca to Spodnji Hotič, but also extending eastwards along the Mošenik, Tržiška Bistrica, Kokra, Kamnik Bistrica, Drtijščica, Nevljica, and Šumščica rivers. Significant settlements where the Upper Carniolan dialect is spoken are Mojstrana, Hrušica, Jesenice, Bled, Lesce, Bohinjska Bistrica, Radovljica, Tržič, Golnik, Naklo, Kokrica, Britof, Kranj, Šenčur, Cerklje na Gorenjskem, Mekinje, Kamnik, Vodice, Medvode, Zgornje Pirniče, Šmarca, Preserje pri Radomljah, Radomlje, Mengeš, Vir, Trzin, Domžale, Izlake, Brezovica pri Ljubljani, and Ljubljana. The subdialect border roughly follows the line from Bela Peč via Snovik and Rafolče to Dol pri Ljubljani.

Historically, it was not spoken in Ljubljana because in the past the Ljubljana dialect displayed features more similar to the Lower Carniolan dialect group. However, it gradually grew closer to the Upper Carniolan dialect group as a consequence of migration from Upper Carniola into Ljubljana in the 19th and 20th centuries. Ljubljana mostly expanded to the north, gradually incorporating many villages that were historically part of Upper Carniola, and so its dialect shifted closer to the Upper Carniolan dialects.

== Accentual changes ==
The Upper Carniolan dialect retained length differences between long and short vowels, as well as pitch accent, with the exception being the subdialect, which lost pitch accent. It has undergone only the *ženȁ → *žèna accent shift, and the accent then became long. The subdialect has also undergone the *məglȁ → *mə̀gla accent shift.

== Phonology ==
The Upper Carniolan dialect evolved from southern proto-dialect, which was characterized by early lengthening of non-final vowels, which are now represented by the same sound. The dialect lacks diphthongs for the most part, which is a rarity for Slovene dialects. Generally, all long e-like sounds turned into ẹː and all long o-like sounds turned into ọː. The far-northwestern microdialects (e.g., the Dovje and Mojstrana microdialects) and the central Tuhinj Valley microdialects still have the diphthongs eːi̯ and oːu̯ for *ě̄ and *ȏ, respectively. The Moravče Valley microdialects have monophthongs for those vowels, but all other long e-like vowels diphthongized into iẹː, and all other long o-like vowels diphthongized into uọː, which was influenced by the Lower Carniolan dialect. In the Kropa microdialect, *ī centralized a bit into i̽. Newly stressed *e and *o after the shift are open-mid eː and oː, but ended up as the diphthongs i̯e and u̯o in the subdialect. Syllabic *ł̥̄ turned into oːu and syllabic *r̥̄ turned into əːr in the north, ər in the south.

There is extensive syncope, which impacted short vowels, particularly short stressed *i and *u, and some microdialects do not even allow those to be stressed. Some microdialects differentiate between open-mid and close-mid e and o.

Shvapanye (evolution of *ł into u̯) is present in the entire area and also extends to final consonants, even after omission of final vowels, but is slowly losing its presence in the south. Alveolar *r turned into uvular ṙ around Kropa and Tržič. Palatal *ĺ and *ń depalatalized (both are still palatal around Bohinj) and *t’ turned into č. The consonant *g spirantized into ɣ around Kranj and Mengeš and in the subdialect. Also common in the north is palatalization of velars before front consonants. Stops are devoiced and often spirantized at the end of a word, particularly b → f. There are many consonant cluster alterations in Upper Carniolan dialect, which vary heavily between microdialects; for example, *tk → xk, *kt → xt, *pt → xt, *pk → fk (rarely), *xt → ft, *pc → fc, *čk → šk, *čn → *šn, *šč → š, *pš → u̯š, *mn → u̯n, *mn → ml, and sometimes *w → l in the Topole microdialect.

== Morphology ==
The dialect has strong and stereotypical masculinization of neuter gender in the singular and dual (e.g., majhen jajc instead of majhno jajce 'little egg') and feminization in the plural (e.g., majhne jajca instead of majhna jajca 'little eggs'). The Topole microdialect also has the ending -a in masculine o-stem nouns instead of -i. Remnants of the former u-stem declension are robust, but the ending -om in the o-stem declension turned into -am. The dual forms are starting to merge with plural forms in noun declension, especially in cases other than the nominative and accusative. The dialect uses the long infinitive (ending in -ə).

== Bibliography ==
- Šekli, Matej (2018). Legan Ravnikar, Andreja (ed.). Topologija lingvogenez slovanskih jezikov (in Slovenian). Translated by Plotnikova, Anastasija. Ljubljana: Znanstvenoraziskovalni center SAZU. ISBN 978-961-05-0137-4.
