= Bela Peč =

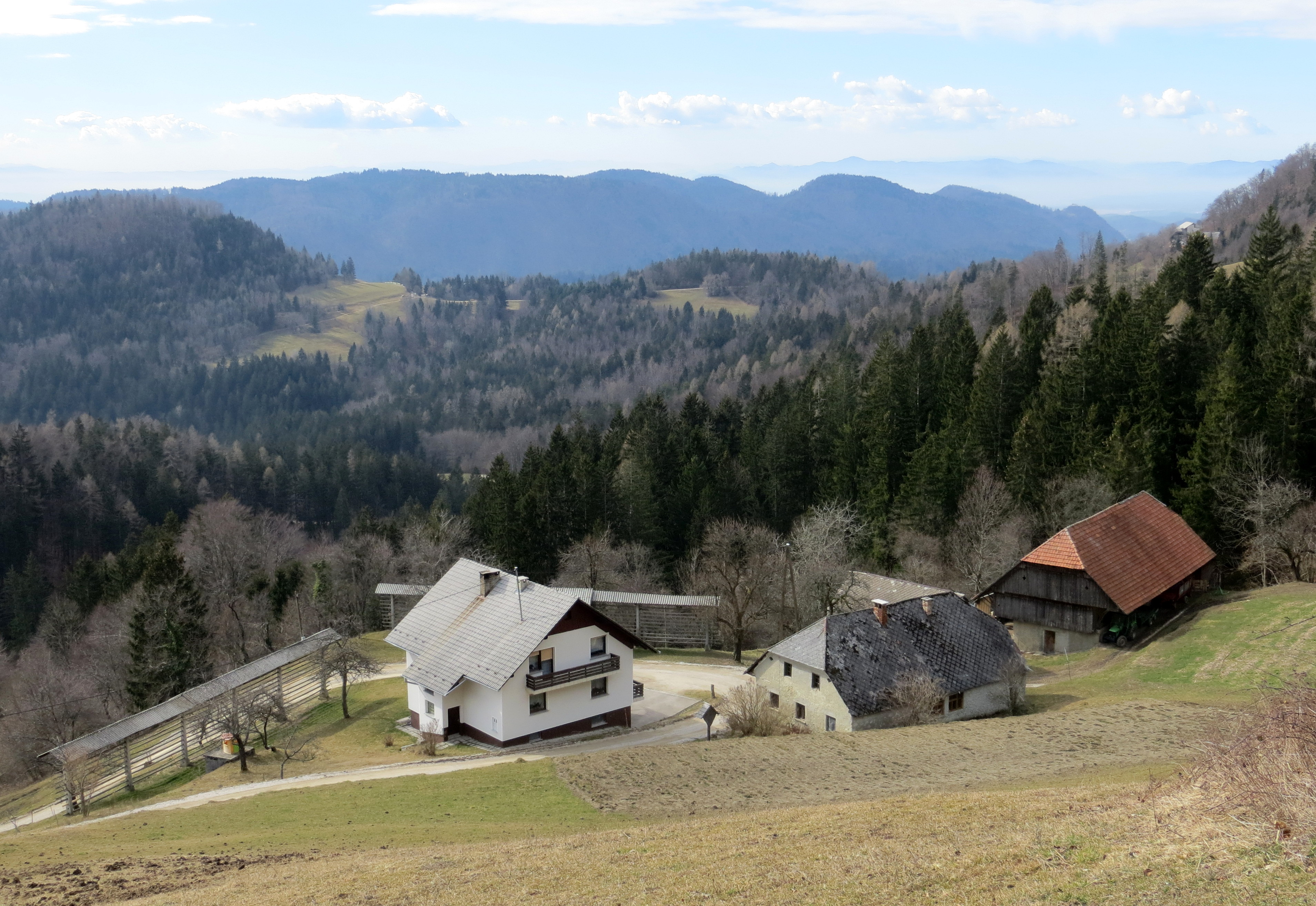

- Location in Slovenia
- Coordinates: 46°14′44.01″N 14°43′9.26″E
- Country: Slovenia
- Traditional region: Upper Carniola
- Statistical region: Central Slovenia
- Municipality: Kamnik
- Elevation: 777.3 m (2,550 ft)

Population (2002)
  - Total: 26

Bela Peč (pronounced [ˈbeːla ˈpeːtʃ]) is a small dispersed settlement in the Municipality of Kamnik in the Upper Carniola region of Slovenia.

== Name ==
The name Bela Peč means 'white cliff' and refers to Podbevšek Cliff (Podbevška peč, 1,190 meters or 3,900 feet), which rises at the north end of the settlement. Toponyms containing the common noun peč 'cliff' are common in Slovenia. Other examples include the nearby villages of Sovinja Peč (literally, 'owl cliff') and Vranja Peč (literally, 'raven cliff').

== Geography ==
Bela Peč is a scattered village below Podbevšek Cliff, which rises above the Toman Pasture (Tomanova planina) to the north. The settlement consists of the hamlets and isolated farms of Osredkar, Podbevšek, Kočevo, and Šmonkar. There is road access to the village from the Tuhinj Valley via Snovik and Sela pri Kamniku. There are fields on the southern slopes below Podbevšek Cliff; they are steep and loamy, and difficult to cultivate.

== History ==
Because of the difficult agricultural conditions in the village, livestock breeding (cattle and especially sheep) dominated in the past. During the Second World War, the Partisans operated a courier station in the village to maintain connections between Upper Carniola and Styria. There was an engagement between the Partisans' Kamnik Company and German forces at the Osredkar farm in May 1942, and a Partisan hospital operated above the farm from March to October 1944. Water mains were installed in the village in 1968.
