= Mekinje =

Mekinje may refer to:

- Mekinje, Kamnik, a settlement in the Municipality of Kamnik, Upper Carniola, Slovenia
- Mekinje nad Stično, a settlement in the Municipality of Ivančna Gorica, Lower Carniola, Slovenia
