= Rabensberg =

Rabensberg (also spelled Rabensberk and Rabensperg) is a German place name that may refer to:

- Koprivnik Castle, a castle ruin in the Municipality of Moravče, central Slovenia
- Ranšperk Castle, a castle ruin in Rupe, Municipality of Celje, eastern Slovenia
- Vranja Peč, a settlement in the Municipality of Kamnik, northern Slovenia
