= Eastern Upper Carniolan subdialect =

Subdialect of Slovene

The Eastern Upper Carniolan subdialect (vzhodnogorenjski govor, vzhodna gorenjščina, vzhodnogorenjsko podnarečje) is a Slovene subdialect in the Upper Carniolan dialect group. It is spoken in the eastern part of Upper Carniola, east of a line running west of Špitalič, Trojane, and Kisovec, then east of Vače and Zgornji Hotič, and then south along the Sava to east of Dol pri Ljubljani.

== Phonological and morphological characteristics ==
The Eastern Upper Carniolan subdialect is a subdialect of the Upper Carniolan dialect. It has preserved pitch accent, except for a small area in Moravče.
