= Selca dialect =

Slovene dialect spoken in the Selca Valley

- Native to: Slovenia
- Region: Selca Valley, Upper Carniola
- Ethnicity: Slovenes
- Language family: Indo-European: Balto-Slavic; Slavic; South Slavic; Western South Slavic; Slovene; Upper Carniolan dialect group; Selca dialect
- Dialects: Western (non-tonal) microdialects; Eastern (tonal) microdialects

Language codes
- ISO 639-3: –
- Selca dialect

The Selca dialect (Slovene: selško narečje [séːwʃkɔ naˈɾéːt͡ʃjɛ], selščina) is a Slovene dialect very close to the Upper Carniolan dialect, but showing some features of the Rovte dialect group. It is characterized by extensive syncope, monopthongization of diphthongs, and shortening of long close vowels. It is spoken in the Selca Valley in the Upper Carniola region. It borders the Upper Carniolan dialect to the north and northeast, the Škofja Loka dialect to the southeast, the Poljane dialect to the south, the Cerkno dialect to the southwest, and the Bača subdialect of the Tolmin dialect to the west. The dialect can be split further to the western, non-tonal dialects and eastern, tonal dialects. The dialect belongs to the Upper Carniolan dialect group, and it evolved from the Upper Carniolan dialect base.

== Geographical distribution ==
The dialect extends across a small area between the Upper Carniolan dialect and the Rovte dialects. It is present in the Selca Valley along the Selca Sora, up to around Praprotno, where it transitions into the Škofja Loka dialect. To the north, it is bounded by Ratitovec and Jelovica and to the south by the Škofja Loka Hills. The dialect is spoken west to Podporezen and Petrovo Brdo, south to Davča and Zapreval, east to Praprotno and Strmica, and north to Dražgoše and Zgornje Danje. The border between its subdivisions is between Podlonk and Železniki. Notable settlements include Železniki, Zgornja Sorica, Zali Log, Studeno, Dražgoše, Selca, Dolenja Vas, and Praprotno.

== Accentual changes ==
The dialect still retains length distinctions, except for *ī and *ū, which became significantly shorter than other long vowels, and short *-ì and *-ù turned into schwa (ə). Eastern microdialects also retain pitch accent. The microdialects in Slovenski lingvistični atlas show a rather clear divide between the tonal and non-tonal dialects; however, Matej Šekli is rather vague when discussing which microdialects are tonal, saying only that some are tonal and some are not. It has undergone only the *ženȁ → *žèna accent shift.

== Phonology ==
The dialect is rather poorly studied, and the only microdialect covered in detail is the Selca microdialect, which this section focuses on.

The phonology is similar to that of the Upper Carniolan dialect. It evolved from the southern proto-dialect, which was characterized by early lengthening of non-final vowels, which are now represented by the same sound. The dialect lacks diphthongs for the most part, which is a rarity for Slovene dialects, but common for the Upper Carniolan dialect. Generally, all long e-like sounds turned into ẹː and all long o-like sounds turned into ọː. *e and *o that became stressed after the *ženȁ → *žèna shift are open-mid eː and oː, respectively. One of the key differences that distinguishes it from the Upper Carniolan dialect is the shortening of long *ī and *ū because of the influence of the Rovte dialects. Stressed syllabic *ł̥ turned into oːu̯ and *r̥ turned into ər. Long *ə̄ turned into aː.

There is extensive syncope and a many short vowels were reduced, to an even greater extent than in the Upper Carniolan dialect. Short stressed *-ù, *-ì, and *-ě̀ have all turned into ə; the same holds true most of the time for their unstressed counterparts. If these sounds are adjacent to l, m, or n, they often turn into syllabic l̥, m̥, and n̥. Ukanye (o → u) is present for initial *o-. The most commonly omitted vowel is *i, which is often omitted in final position, and sometimes also medially. Omissions of *ə, *ě, and *u are also common.

However, consonants did not experience as much simplification as in the Upper Carniolan dialect. Most of the dialects lack shvapanye (*ł → u̯). Secondary palatalization of velars before front vowels and spirantization of stops is not particularly common; however, these features vary from dialect to dialect. The cluster *šč, at least in the Selca dialect, has simplified into š, and palatal *ĺ and *ń depalatalized and merged with *l and *n, respectively. Initial o- received a prosthetic u̯ or v. Final obstruents still retain voicing. In Sorica in the westernmost part of the dialect, alveolar *s, *z, and *c merged with post-alveolar *š, *ž, and *č, respectively. This is a feature more common in the Bača subdialect.

== Morphology ==
Little is known about the morphology. The ending -om in o-stem nouns turned into -am, and nouns ending in -l̥ have an -n- infix before the ending. The infinitive does not have the ending -i; however, too little research has been done to accentually determine whether the infinitive is short or long. There is masculinization of neuter nouns, but it is unknown whether feminization also occurs in the plural.

== Bibliography ==
- Benedik, Francka (1995). "Fonološki opis govora vasi Selca". Filologija. No. 24–25 (in Slovenian) (24–25). Zagreb: Hrvatska akademija znanosti i umjetnosti: 53–59. eISSN 1848-8919. ISSN 0449-363X.
- Logar, Tine (1996). Kenda-Jež, Karmen (ed.). Dialektološke in jezikovnozgodovinske razprave [Dialectological and etymological discussions] (in Slovenian). Ljubljana: Znanstvenoraziskovalni center SAZU, Inštitut za slovenski jezik Frana Ramovša. ISBN 961-6182-18-8.
- Šekli, Matej (2018). Legan Ravnikar, Andreja (ed.). Tipologija lingvogenez slovanskih jezikov (in Slovenian). Translated by Plotnikova, Anastasija. Ljubljana: Znanstvenoraziskovalni center SAZU. ISBN 978-961-05-0137-4.
