= Jessie Case Vesel =

English painter who worked for ten years in what is now Slovenia (1855–1937)

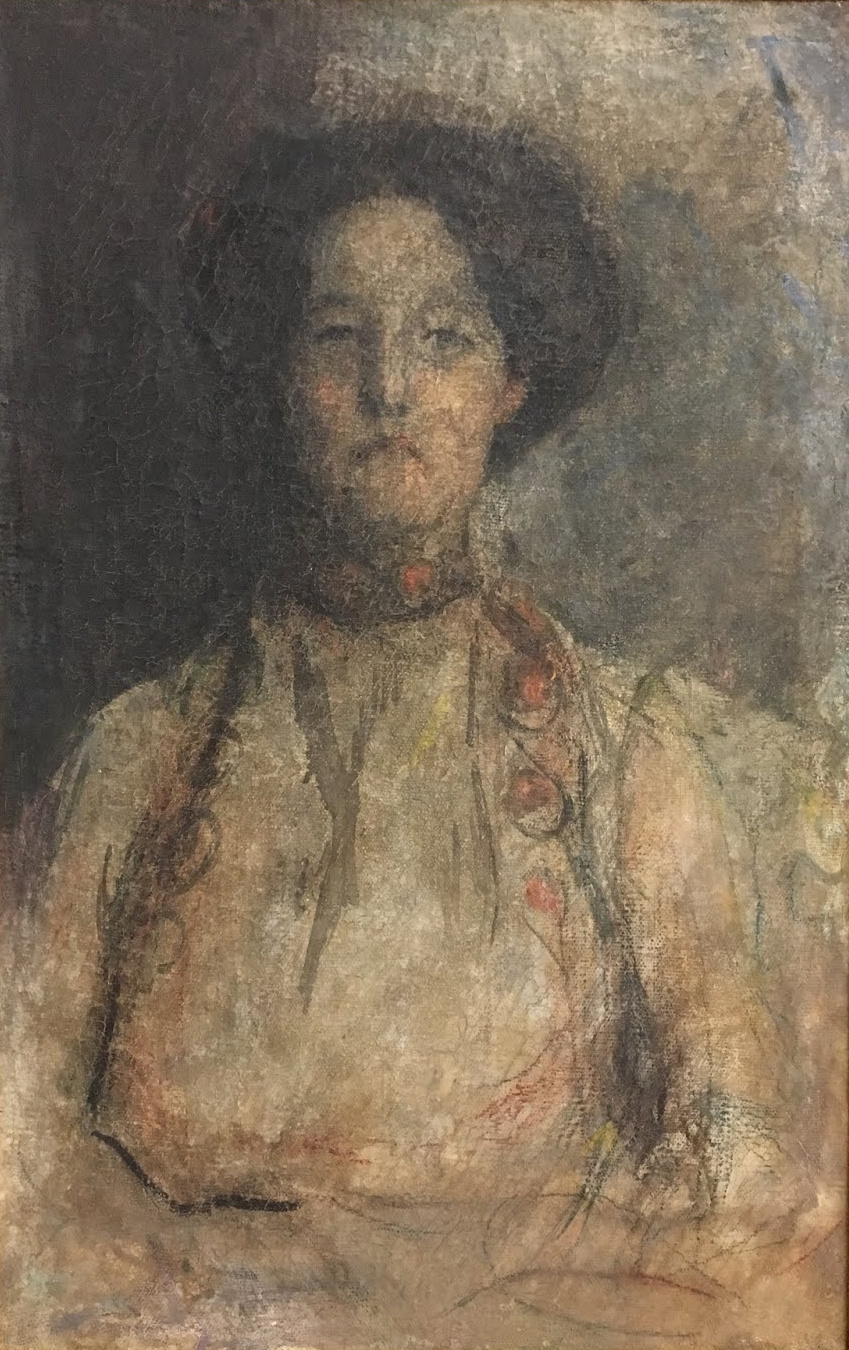
- Portrait of Jessy Case, oil on canvas, painted in 1897 by Ferdo Vesel and held by the National Gallery of Slovenia
- Born: Catharine Jessie Case; September 1855; Hampstead
- Died: 20 March 1937 (aged 81); Exmoor
- Occupation: painter

Catharine Jessie Case Vesel (September 1855 – 20 March 1937) was an English painter who worked for ten years in what is now Slovenia.

== Biography ==
Jessie Case Vesel was born in September 1855 to an English family in Hampstead. In 1895 she attended an art school in Schwabing where she was taught by the Slovenian painter Ferdo Vesel.

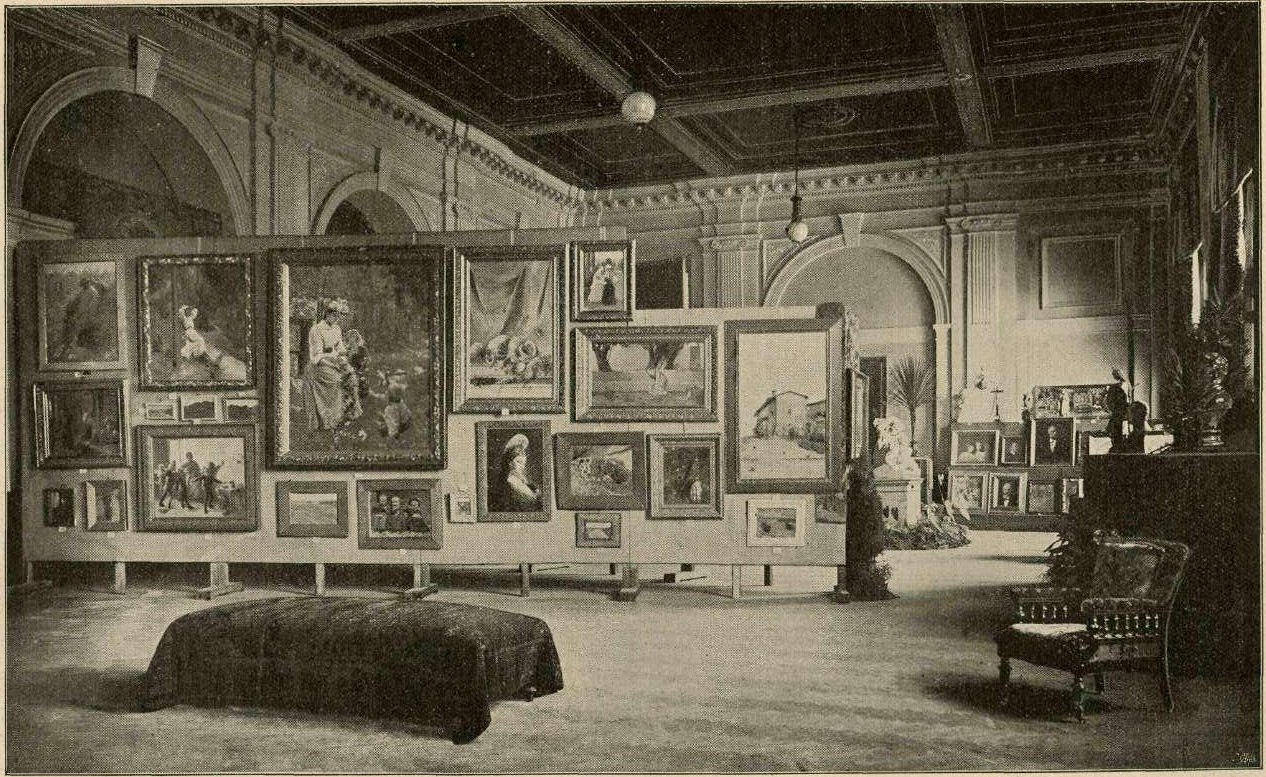
First Slovenian Art Exhibition in Ljubljana, 1900

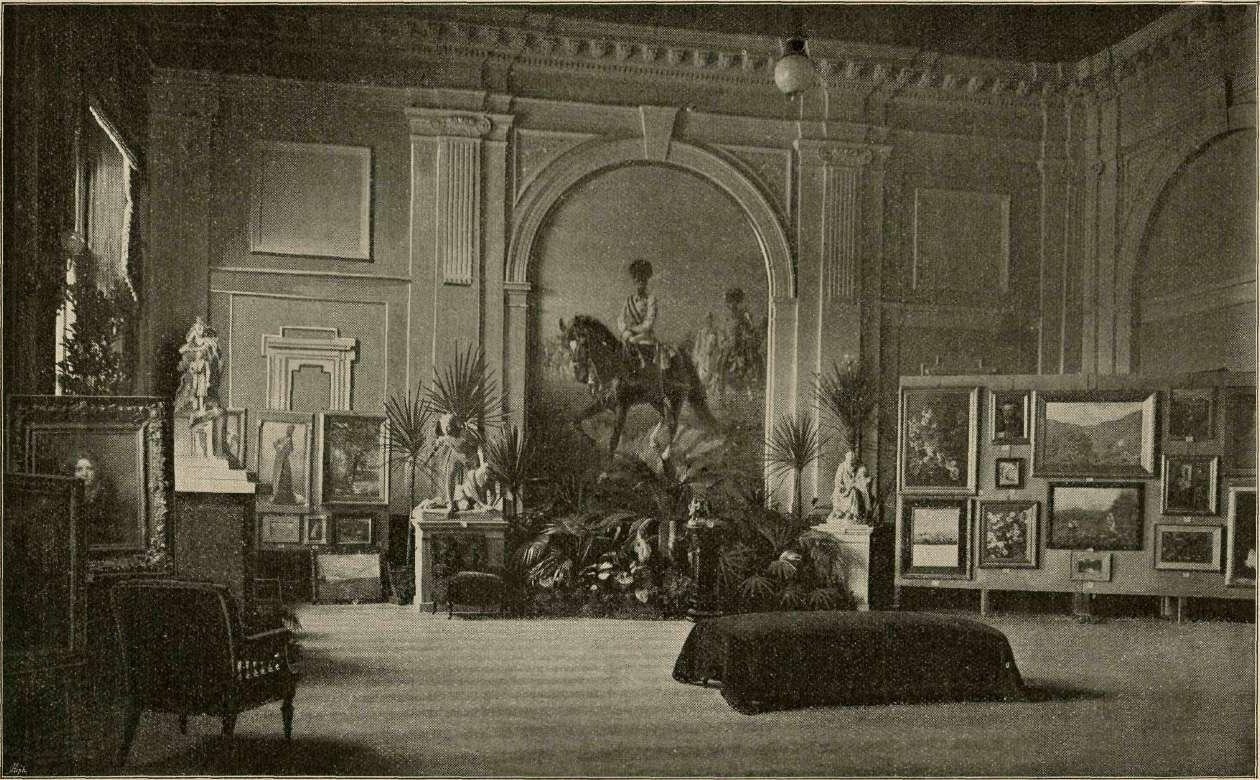
First Slovenian Art Exhibition in Ljubljana, 1900

She and Ferdo Vesel grew closer, and at the beginning of 1897 she posed for him for her portrait, which is now held by the National Gallery of Slovenia. In September 1897 they married in Hampstead. After the wedding they travelled around Europe for more than a year. In 1899 they moved to his homeland where they lived in the former Ursuline monastery in Mekinje, Kamnik. In 1900 Jessie Case Vesel took part in the first Slovene art exhibition in Ljubljana. She exhibited two watercolour landcapes: Pri apnenici (By the Lime Kiln) and V neveljski dolini (In the Nevlje Valley). In the exhibition catalogue she is listed as a painter living in Kamnik. In the summer of 1901 she and her husband moved to the Grumlof estate in Lower Carniola, which they purchased with her money. She visited England again in 1901. Soon afterward she and her husband again set off on a trip around Europe. In 1908 her husband divorced her, and she returned to England. She never returned to Slovenia. In 1913 she lived in St Ives in Cornwall, where there was a large artists’ colony, and she continued painting. She died on 20. March 1937 in Exmoor.
