= Škofja Loka Passion Play =

1721 play from Slovene

Škofja Loka Passion Play Škofjeloški pasijon
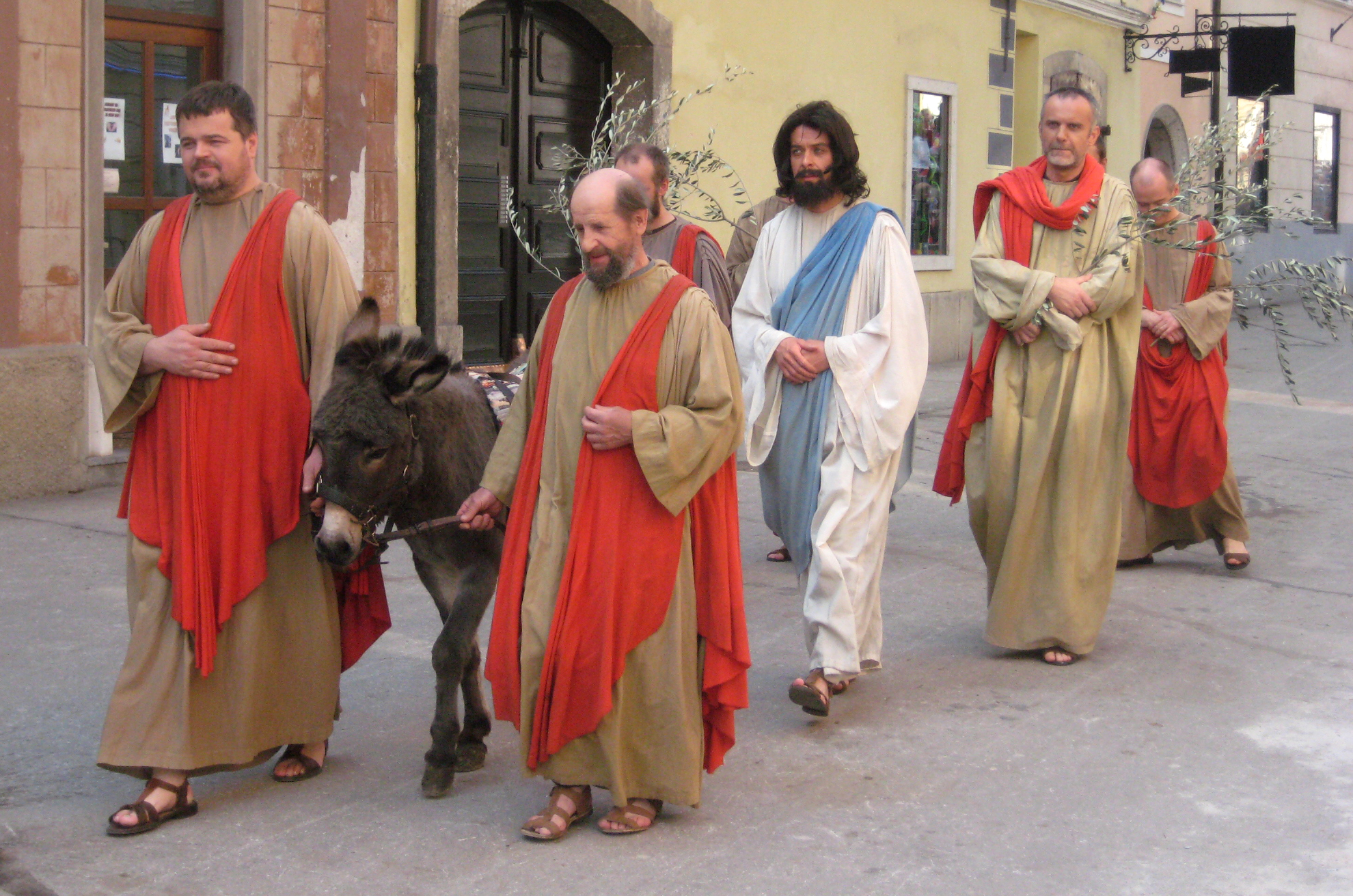
- A scene from the Škofja Loka Passion Play (2009)
- Date: Good Friday
- Locations: Škofja Loka, Slovenia

Škofja Loka Passion Play
- UNESCO Intangible Cultural Heritage
- Country: Slovenia
- Reference: 01203
- Region: Europe and North America

Inscription history
- Inscription: 2016 (11th session)
- List: Representative

The Škofja Loka Passion Play (Latin: Processio locopolitana, Slovene: Škofjeloški pasijon) is the oldest play in Slovene. In its current form, it was a penitential Passion procession. It was written on the basis of an older tradition in 1715, with minor corrections until 1727, by Father Romuald (Lovrenc Marusič; 1676–1748), a Capuchin friar who lived for a period in the Škofja Loka Capuchin monastery in the town of Škofja Loka. The passion presents Biblical stories, particularly from the life of Jesus. It consists of 869 verses, written in the old Škofja Loka dialect. They are divided into 13 tableaux. It belongs to the Baroque period and represents the oldest preserved director's book in the world. The play's manuscript is kept by the Škofja Loka monastery.

The play was originally staged on Good Friday each year until 1751. After almost three hundred years, it was presented again in 1936 as part of an exhibition, and revived in 1999, 2000, 2009, and 2015, with the most recent performance taking place in 2026. The first two reprisals were directed by Marjan Kokalj, and the latest by Borut Gartner. They were performed by around 640 amateur actors and actresses, among them 80 cavalrymen. The tableaux were divided into 20 scenes. The National Youth Council of Slovenia bestowed the Municipality of Škofja Loka a special recognition for a volunteer project in 2010, after the municipality had organised the play in the previous year. In 2008, the performance has been entered in the Slovenian intangible cultural heritage register. Its reprisals in Škofja Loka are the largest open-air theatre productions in Slovenia.

== See also ==
- Long-running plays (non-musicals)
- Oberammergau Passion Play
