= Sovinja Peč =

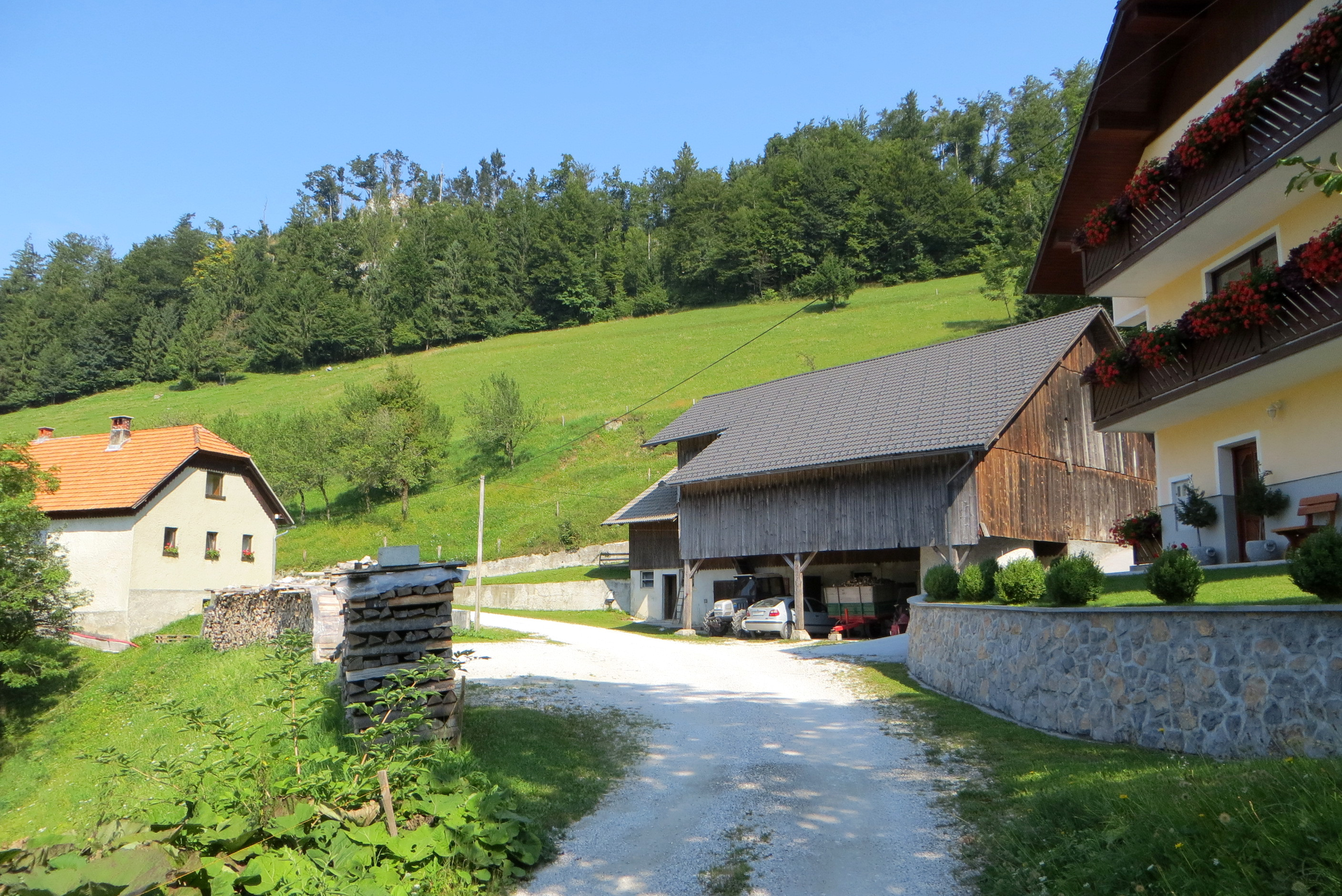

- Location in Slovenia
- Coordinates: 46°15′19.47″N 14°42′1.85″E
- Country: Slovenia
- Traditional region: Upper Carniola
- Statistical region: Central Slovenia
- Municipality: Kamnik

Area
  - Total: 1.28 km^{2} (0.49 sq mi)
- Elevation: 890.2 m (2,921 ft)

Population (2002)
  - Total: 29

Sovinja Peč (pronounced [sɔˈʋiːnja ˈpeːtʃ], in older sources also Sovina Peč and Savinja Peč, German: Sawinapetsch) is a small dispersed settlement in the hills immediately south of the Črnivec Pass in the Municipality of Kamnik in the Upper Carniola region of Slovenia.

== Name ==
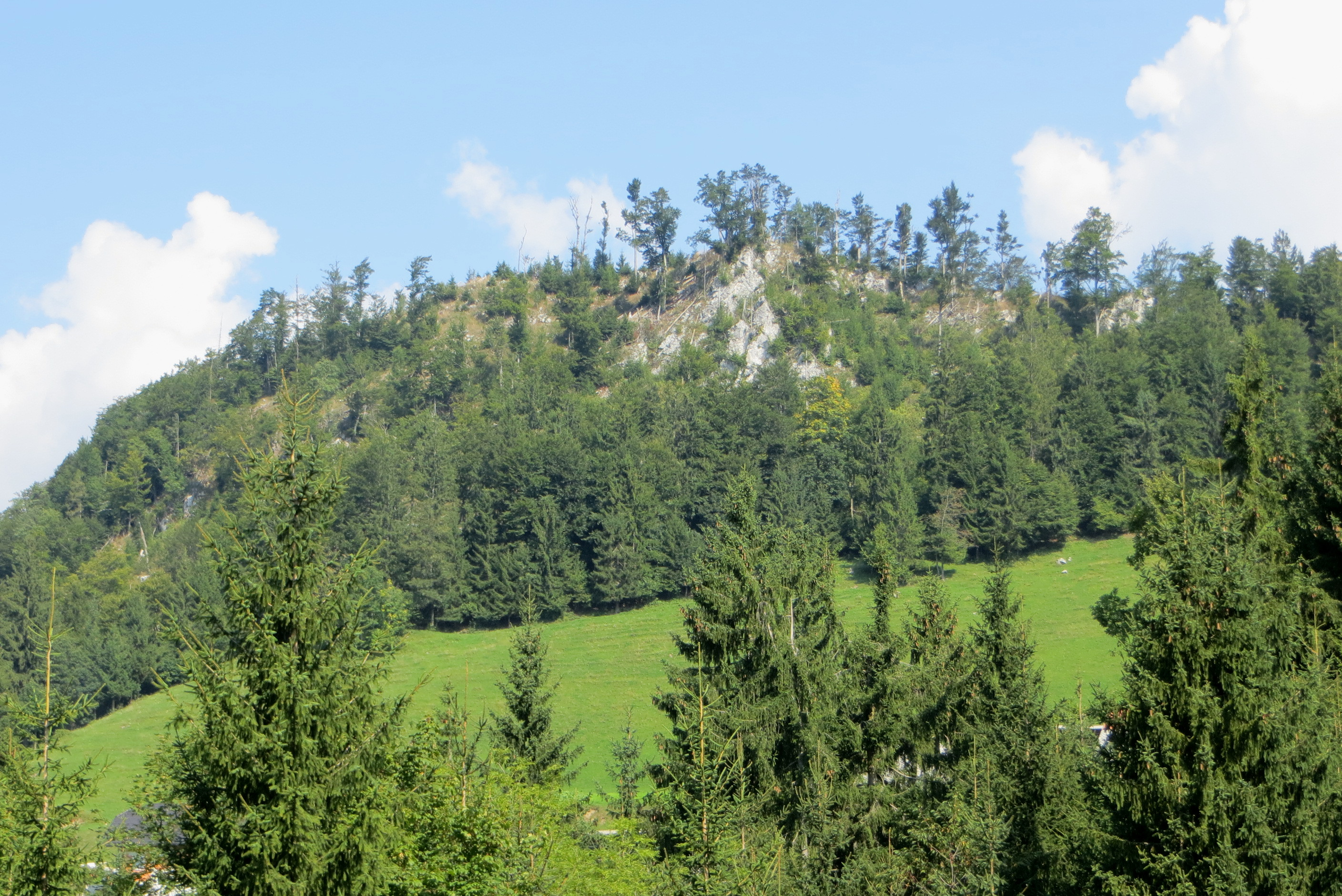
Sovina Peak (Sovinjski vrh)

The name Sovinja Peč is derived from the surname Sovina and literally means 'Sovina cliff'. The designation "cliff" refers to Sovina Peak (Slovene: Sovinjski vrh, 1,004 meters or 3,294 feet), which rises north of the village. The older spelling Savinja Peč, along with German Sawinapetsch, shows pretonic akanje. The surname Sovina is probably derived from the personal name Sova, originally used as a nickname based on the common noun sova 'owl'.
