= Upper Carniolan dialect group =

Group of dialects of Slovene

Map of regional groups of Slovene dialects Upper Carniolan

The Upper Carniolan dialect group (gorenjska narečna skupina) is a group of closely related dialects of Slovene. The Upper Carniolan dialects are spoken in most of Upper Carniola and in Ljubljana.

Standard Slovene was formed in the 18th and 19th centuries, based on both the Upper and the Lower Carniolan dialect groups, more specifically on the language of Ljubljana and adjacent areas.

== Phonological and morphological characteristics ==
Among other features, this group is characterized by monophthongal stressed vowels, an acute semivowel, pitch accent, standard circumflex shift, and two accentual retractions with some exceptions. It features narrowing of o and e in preaccentual position, akanye (reduction of o to a) in postaccentual position, and strong syncope. There is a partial development of g to [ɣ], preservation of bilabial w, and general hardening of soft l and n.

== Individual dialects and subdialects ==
- Upper Carniolan dialect (gorenjsko narečje, gorenjščina)
  - Eastern Upper Carniolan subdialect (vzhodnogorenjski govor, vzhodna gorenjščina)
- Selca dialect (selško narečje, selščina)
