= Praprotno =

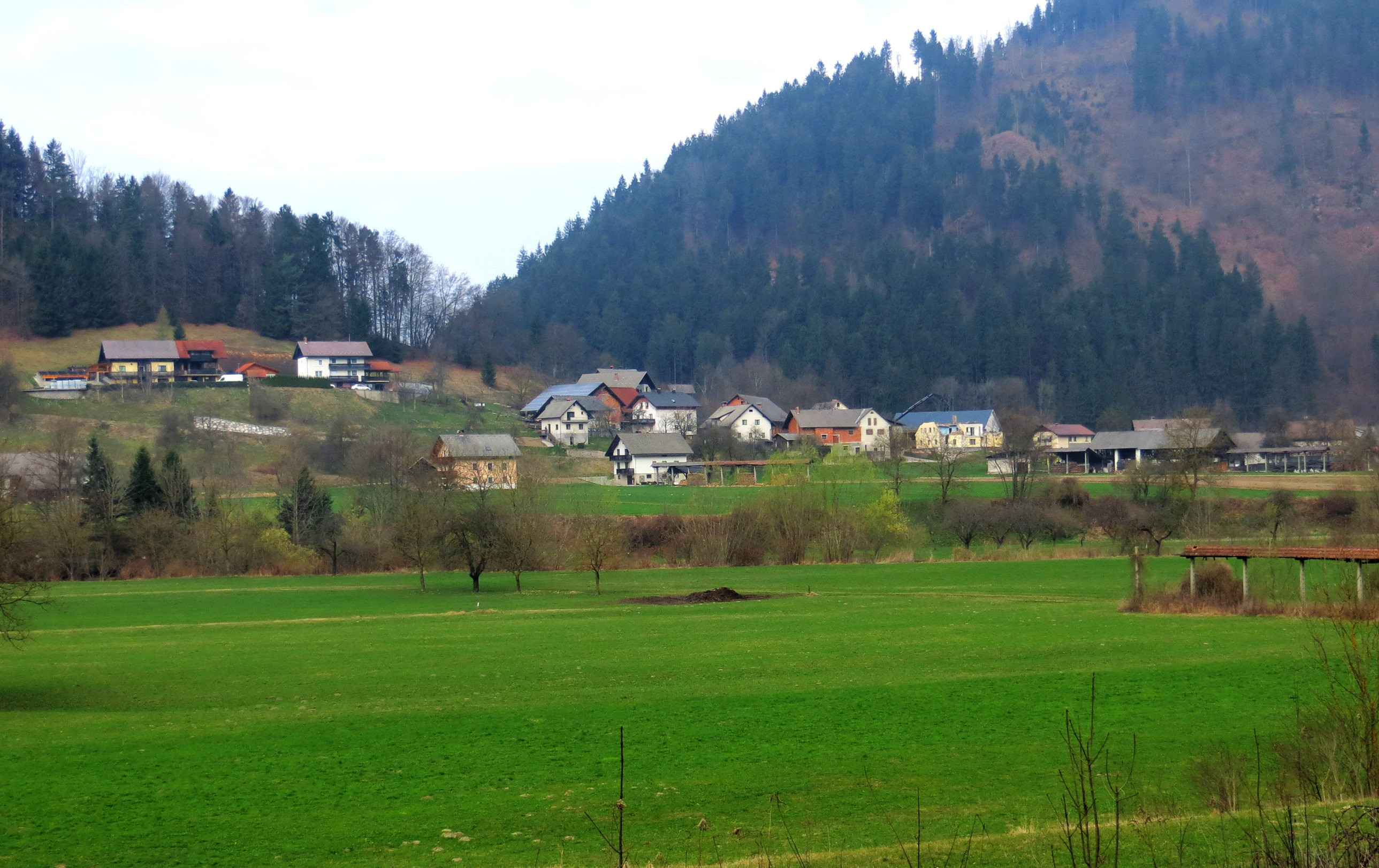

- Location in Slovenia
- Coordinates: 46°11′38.84″N 14°15′36.27″E
- Country: Slovenia
- Traditional region: Upper Carniola
- Statistical region: Upper Carniola
- Municipality: Škofja Loka

Area
  - Total: 2.47 km^{2} (0.95 sq mi)
- Elevation: 390.4 m (1,281 ft)

Population (2002)
  - Total: 134

Praprotno (pronounced [ˈpɾaːpɾɔtnɔ]) is a small settlement in the Municipality of Škofja Loka in the Upper Carniola region of Slovenia.

== Name ==
Praprotno was attested in historical sources in German as Varngried in 1291 and Varengriet in 1414, and in Slovene as Praprotsch in 1476. Like the older German names (cf. Farn 'fern'), the name Praprotno is derived from the Slovene word praprot 'fern' and, like similar names (e.g., Praproče, Parpreče, Praprotno Brdo, and Paprače = German: Farrendorf), it originally referred to the local vegetation.
