= Gail Valley dialect =

Carinthian variety of Slovene

The Gail Valley dialect (Slovene: ziljsko narečje, ziljščina) is the westernmost Slovene dialect in the Carinthian dialect group, spoken in parts of southern Carinthia in Austria, in the northeasternmost part of the Province of Udine in Italy, and in northeastern Upper Carniola in Slovenia.

== Geographic extension ==
It is spoken in Austrian Carinthia in the Gail Valley east of Hermagor and west of Faak am See (Slovene: Bače), in the upper Canale Valley (Italian: Val Canale, Slovene: Kanalska dolina) along the Fella River (Slovene: Bela) to east of Pontebba and, together with the Kranjska Gora subdialect, along the upper course of the Sava Dolinka River to east of Gozd–Martuljek. Settlements in the dialect area include Malborghetto, Ugovizza, Valbruna, Camporosso, Cave del Predil, and Tarvisio (in Italy), Förolach, Faak am See, Feistritz an der Gail, Arnoldstein, Fürnitz, and Mallestig (in Austria), and Rateče, Kranjska Gora, and Gozd Martuljek (in Slovenia). Viktor Paulsen divided the Gail Valley dialect into six subdialects: the Egg-Görtschach subdialect (comprising the Egg and Görtschach groups), the Potschach subdialect, the Saak subdialect, the Vorderberg subdialect, the Feistritz subdialect, and the Radendorf subdialect.

== Phonological and morphological characteristics ==
The Gail Valley dialect has pitch accent, reduction of vowels to ə in preaccentual position, development of open e and o > a in postaccentual position, shortening of long vowels in closed syllables, frequent epenthetic n, v > b before e i r l, hiatus as a result of elision of intervocalic [w] (e.g., krava > kraa 'cow'), voiced obstruents in word-final position, and an inflected conditional auxiliary (besem, besi, be). The Gail Valley dialect has palatalization of k, g, h > č, ž, š before front vowels and lacks the standard Slovene morphophonemic alternation between [l] and [w]; for example, [piu̯], [piu̯a] instead of [piu̯], [pila] 'drank' (masc., fem.), a phenomenon known as švapanje in Slovene.
