= Vranja Peč =

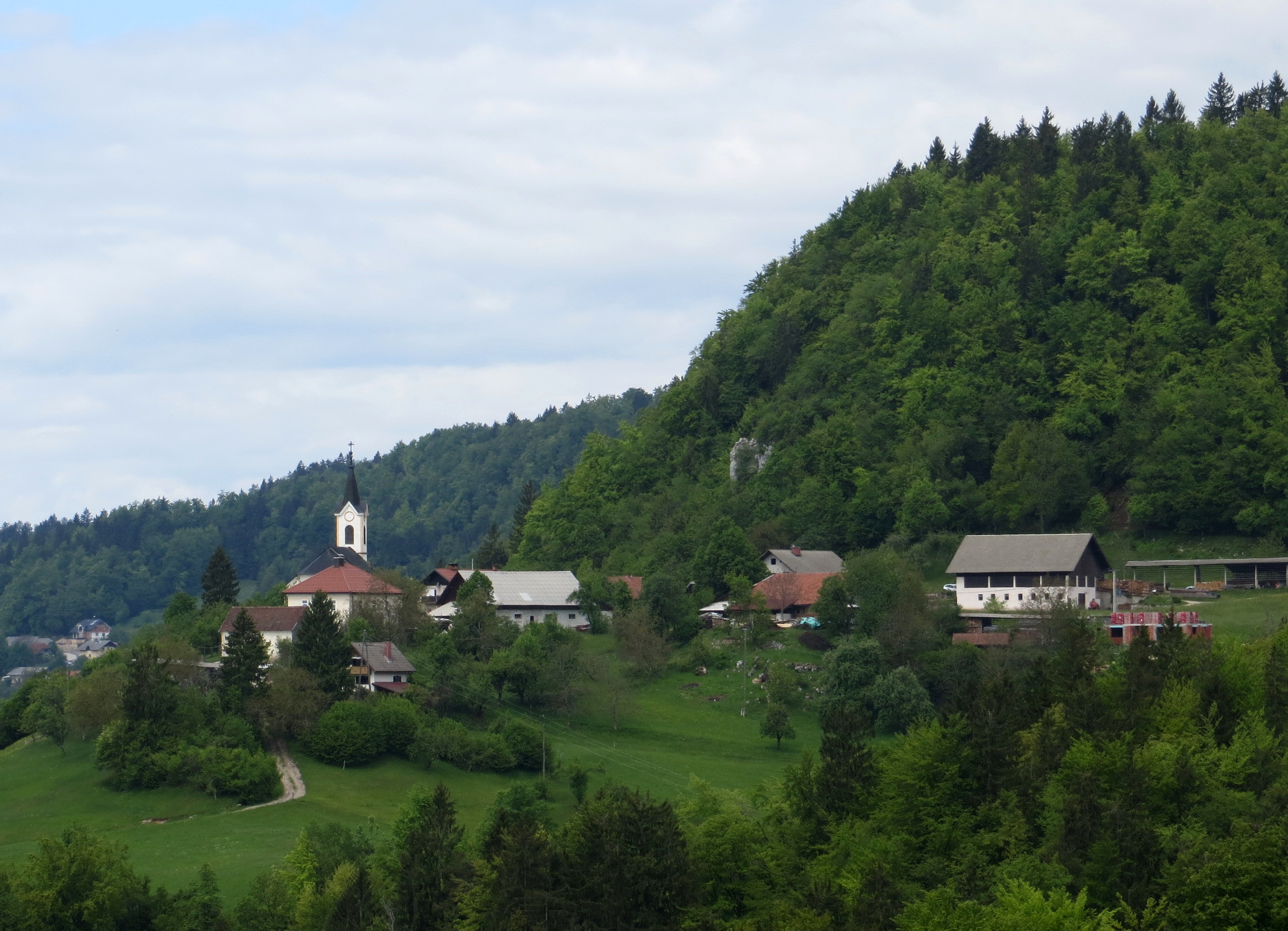

- Location in Slovenia
- Coordinates: 46°12′38.21″N 14°40′17.74″E
- Country: Slovenia
- Traditional region: Upper Carniola
- Statistical region: Central Slovenia
- Municipality: Kamnik

Area
  - Total: 0.94 km^{2} (0.36 sq mi)
- Elevation: 663.2 m (2,176 ft)

Population (2002)
  - Total: 36

Vranja Peč (pronounced [ˈwɾaːnja ˈpeːtʃ]; German: Rabensberg) is a small settlement in the hills above the Tuhinj Valley in the Municipality of Kamnik in the Upper Carniola region of Slovenia.

== Church ==
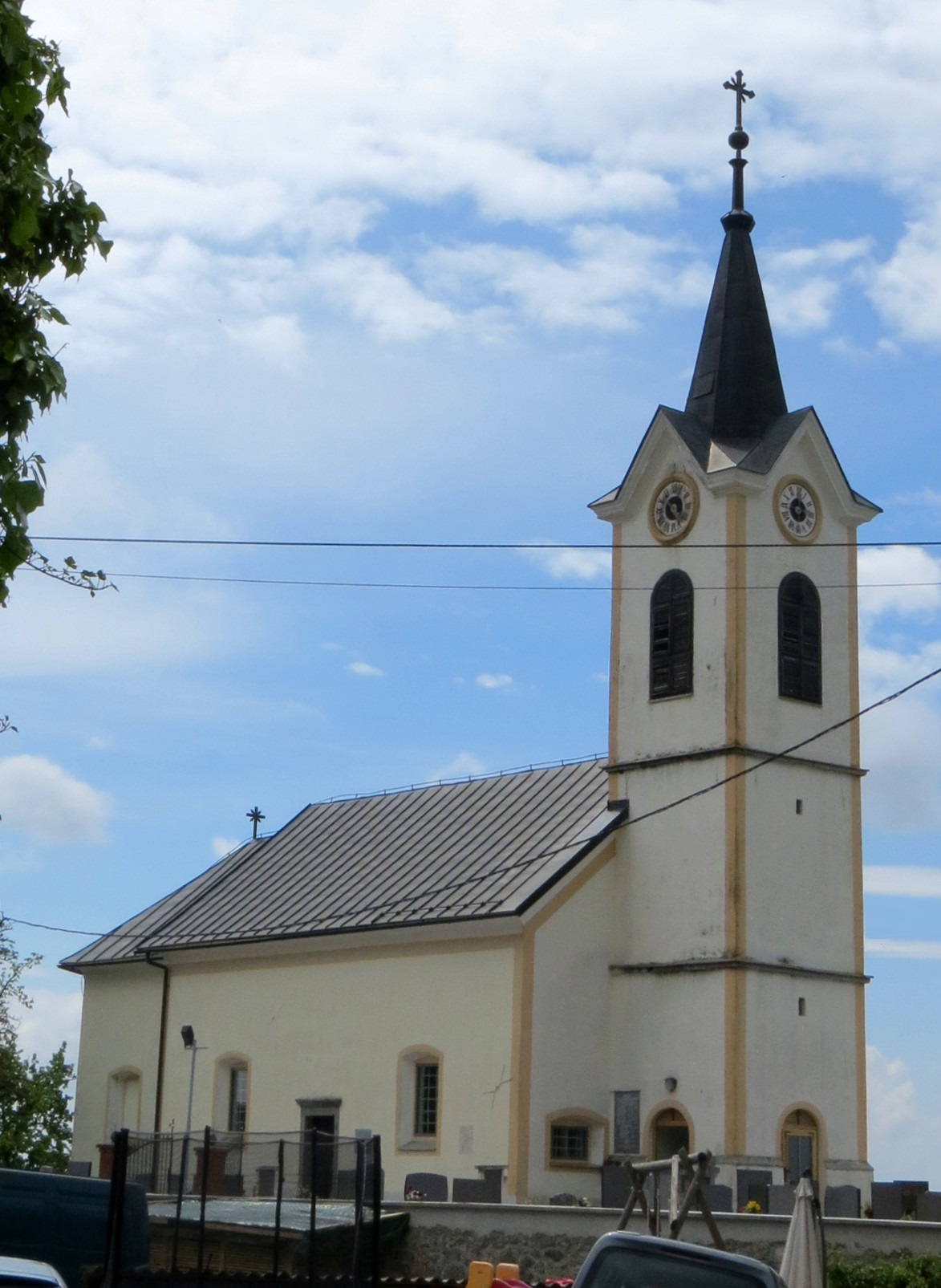
Saint Ulrich's Church

The parish church in the settlement is dedicated to Saint Ulrich.
