= Škofja Loka dialect =

Dialect of Slovene

The Škofja Loka dialect (Slovene: škofjeloško narečje, škofjeloščina) is a Slovene dialect in the Rovte dialect group. It encompasses the local dialects of Škofja Loka and the nearby settlements of Bitnje and Reteče. The Škofja Loka Passion Play, the oldest Slovene drama play, was written in the first half of the 18th century in the old Škofja Loka dialect.

== Phonological and morphological characteristics ==
The Škofja Loka dialect lacks pitch accent, which has been attributed to the influence of German settlement. It has very narrow o and e vowels, pretonic e and o have raised to i and u, and the offglide -u̯ has sometimes been lost (e.g., volk [vou̯k] > [vok] 'wolf'). The dialect's consonant structure shares many features with the Upper Carniolan dialect and Selca dialect.
