= Snovik =

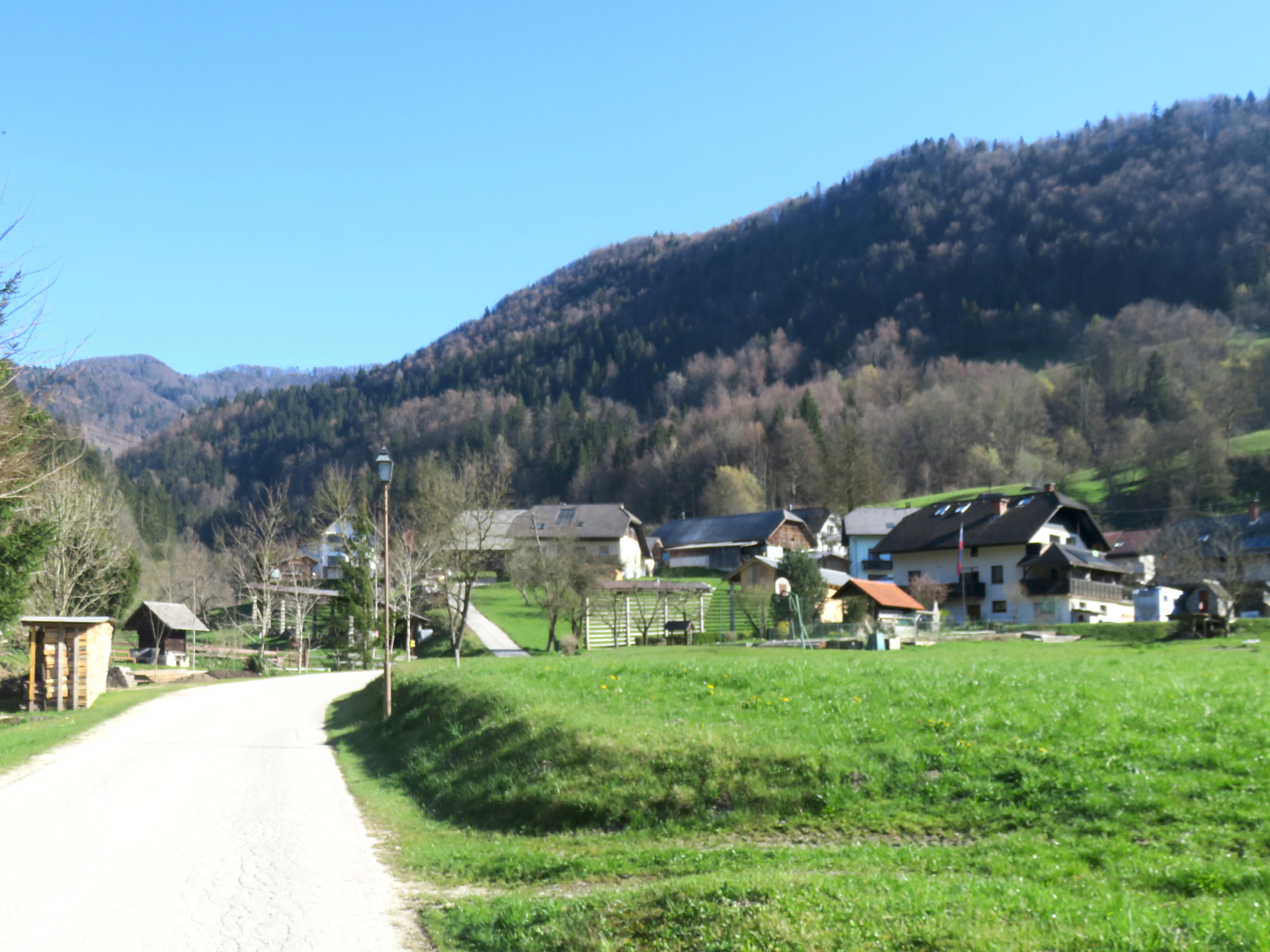

- Location in Slovenia
- Coordinates: 46°13′58.91″N 14°42′35.89″E
- Country: Slovenia
- Traditional region: Upper Carniola
- Statistical region: Central Slovenia
- Municipality: Kamnik

Area
  - Total: 0.64 km^{2} (0.25 sq mi)
- Elevation: 485.3 m (1,592 ft)

Population (2002)
  - Total: 44

Snovik (pronounced [snɔˈʋiːk]) is a small settlement in the Tuhinj Valley in the Municipality of Kamnik in the Upper Carniola region of Slovenia.

== Name ==
Based on evidence from medieval sources, the name Snovik is derived from *Jesenovik 'ash grove'.

== Snovik Spa ==
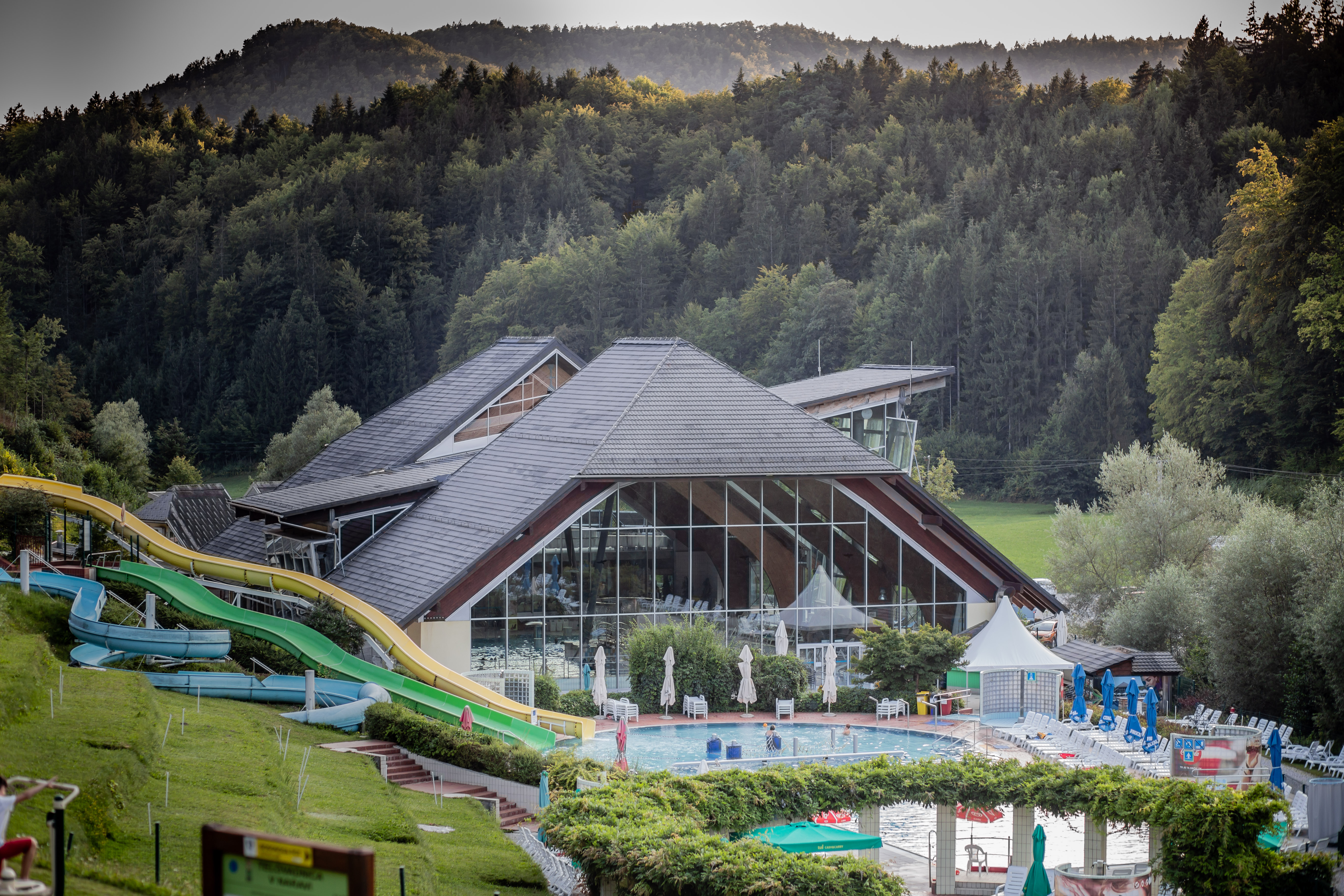
Snovik Spa

The recently developed Snovik Spa is located near Snovik. It utilizes thermal water from the area with indoor and outdoor pools and offers a range of health programs, recreational activities, and accommodation.
