= Mekinje nad Stično =

Mekinje nad Stično Mekinje (until 1953)
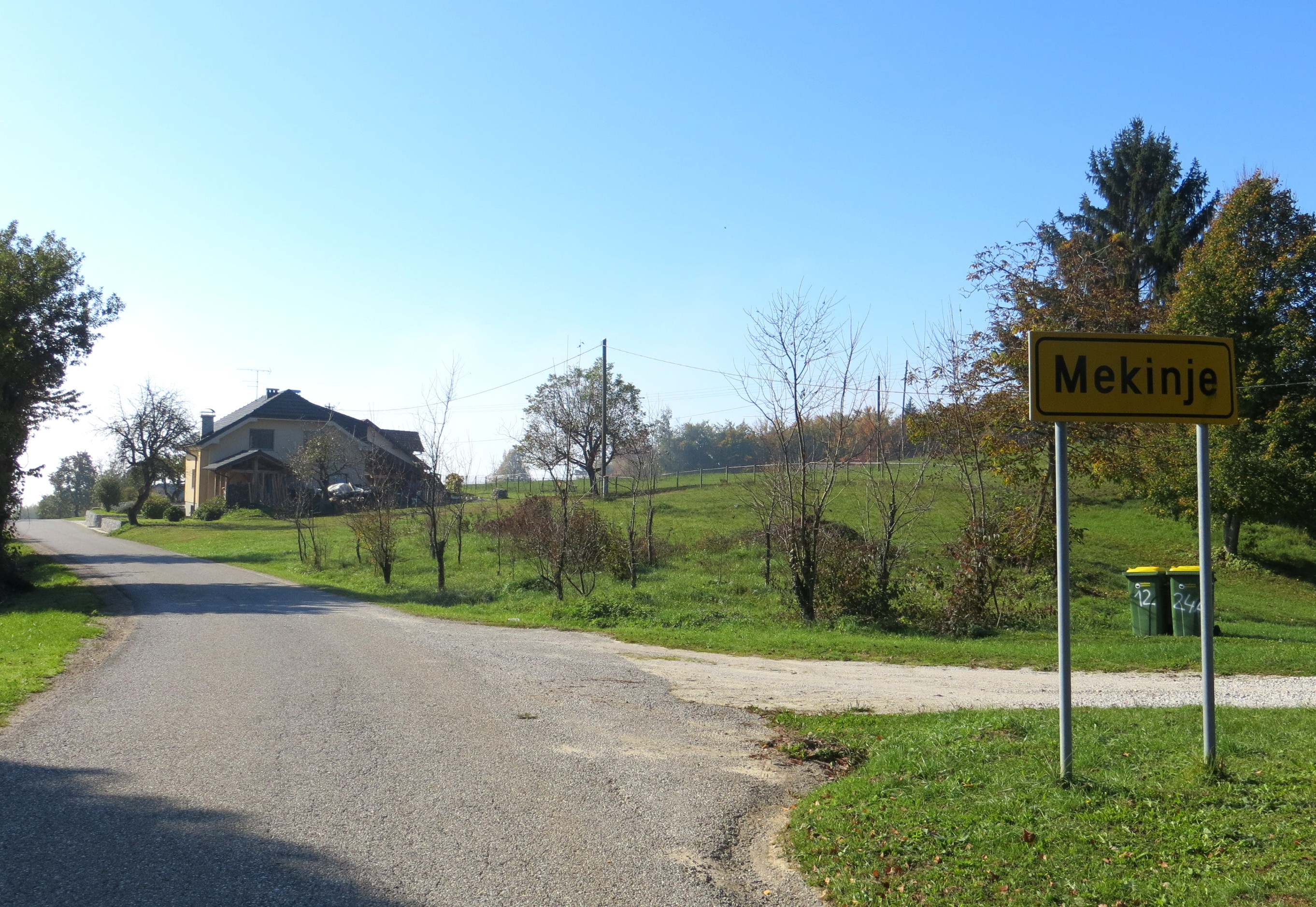

- Location in Slovenia
- Coordinates: 45°57′52.47″N 14°48′46.93″E
- Country: Slovenia
- Traditional region: Lower Carniola
- Statistical region: Central Slovenia
- Municipality: Ivančna Gorica

Area
  - Total: 1.59 km^{2} (0.61 sq mi)
- Elevation: 462.9 m (1,519 ft)

Population (2002)
  - Total: 132

Mekinje nad Stično (pronounced [mɛˈkiːnjɛ nat ˈstiːtʃnɔ]; in older sources also Mekine) is a settlement just north of Stična in the Municipality of Ivančna Gorica in central Slovenia. The area is part of the historical region of Lower Carniola. The municipality is now included in the Central Slovenia Statistical Region.

== Name ==
The name of the settlement was changed from Mekinje to Mekinje nad Stično in 1953.
