= Mekinje, Kamnik =

Mekinje
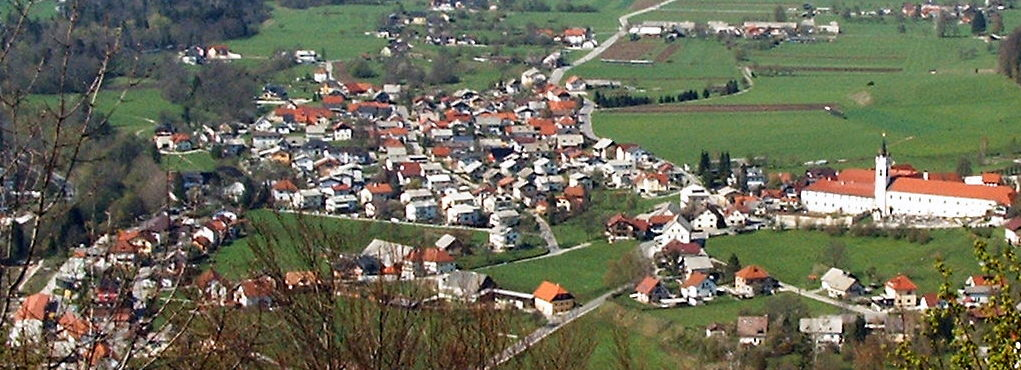
- Mekinje from the south

- Location in Slovenia
- Coordinates: 46°14′10.18″N 14°36′45.28″E
- Country: Slovenia
- Traditional region: Upper Carniola
- Statistical region: Central Slovenia
- Municipality: Kamnik

Area
  - Total: 1.24 km^{2} (0.48 sq mi)
- Elevation: 395.6 m (1,298 ft)

Population (2002)
  - Total: 1,493

Mekinje (pronounced [mɛˈkiːnjɛ]; in older sources also Mekine, German: Münkendorf, Minkendorf) is a settlement at the confluence of the Kamnik Bistrica and Nevljica rivers in the Municipality of Kamnik in the Upper Carniola region of Slovenia. It is considered a suburb of the town of Kamnik.

== Name ==
Mekinje was attested in written sources in 1143–47 as Minkendorf (and as Minchendor(f) in 1209 and Menkendorf in 1288). The name is probably based on the Slavic personal name *Mękyna (< *mękъ(kъ) 'soft'), meaning 'Mękyna's village' and referring to an early inhabitant of the place. It is less likely that the name is based on the common noun *mękyn'i 'bran; chaff, husks; soft straw'. The settlement was known as Münkendorf or Minkendorf in German in the past.

== Convent ==
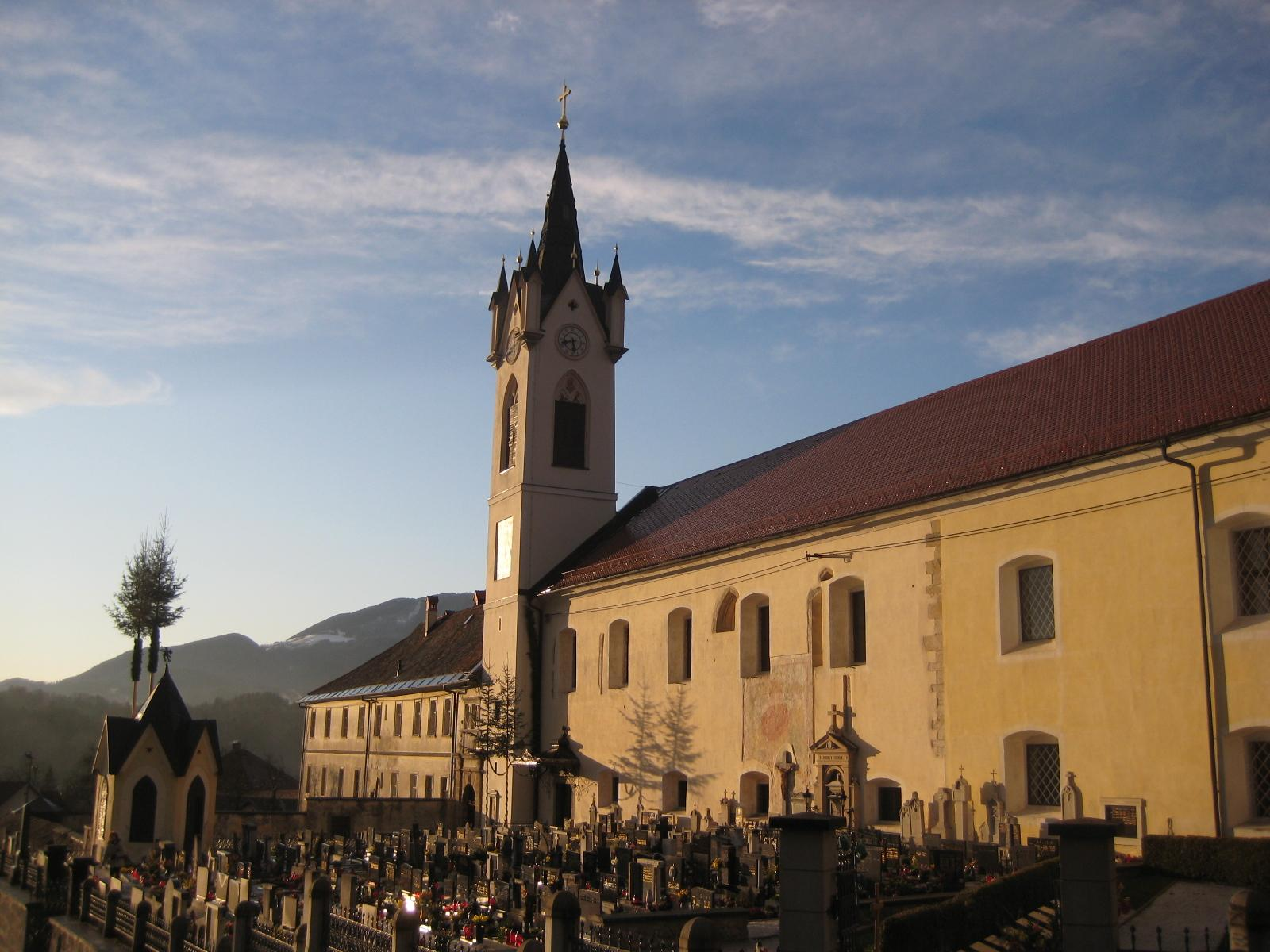
Ursuline convent on the outskirts of Mekinje

Mekinje is the location of a large former Ursuline convent. The convent with its church dedicated to the Virgin Mary was founded in 1300 by Siegfried of Gallenberg and granted to the Poor Clares. The original monastery was destroyed in 1491 during Ottoman raids and was rebuilt soon after. It was totally rebuilt again in the late 17th century (1682), but by the end of the 18th century it was dissolved by Emperor Joseph II. From 1899 to 1901, the English painter Jessie Case Vesel lived there. From 1902 to 1945 it was administered by the Ursuline Order from Ljubljana, but then nationalized after the Second World War and only returned to the order in 1990. From 1972 to 2000 it served as a storage unit for the National and University Library of Slovenia and the convent still has a rich library of its own. In September 2016, the Ursulines donated the convent to the Municipality of Kamnik. In December 2021, the municipality set up a permanent exhibition on the life and work of the Ursulines there.

== Bridge ==
The bridge over the Nevljica in Mekinje was built between 1952 and 1955. Its location was selected by Jože Plečnik, and its detailed plans were created by his assistant Anton Bitenc, based on Plečnik's plans.

== Notable people ==
Notable people that were born or lived in Mekinje include:

- Matej Furlan (1725?–1780), beekeeper
- Jessie Case Vesel (1855–1937), English painter
