= Moravče Valley =

Geographical feature in Central Slovenia

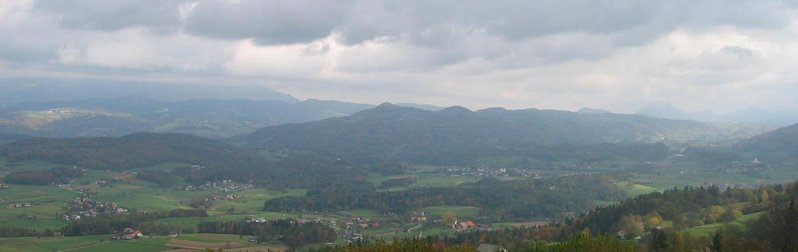

Geography
- Country: Slovenia

The Moravče Valley is a geographical feature in Central Slovenia.

== Geography ==
A part of the Posavje folds, the Moravče valley reaches to Moravče and is composed of sediments of tertiary nature. Of predominance are various sandstones, sands and Miocene Era marlaceous clays. Beneath the rock, layers exist of mostly dolomized limestone, dolomites and Early Jurassic and Upper Triassic limestone.
