= Central Chakavian =

Dialect of the Chakavian variety of Croatian

- srednječakavski dijalekt
- Language family: Indo-European: Balto-Slavic; Slavic; South Slavic; Western; Chakavian; Central Chakavian

Language codes
- ISO 639-3: –
- Glottolog: None

Central Chakavian (also translated as Middle Chakavian; Croatian: srednječakavski dijalekt) is a dialect of the Chakavian variety of Croatian. It is spoken on the islands Dugi, Kornati, Lošinj, Krk, Rab, Ugljan (except the southernmost Southern Chakavian village of Kukljica, exhibiting many shared features with Ugljan's otherwise Central Chakavian dialects) Pag, on the land the cities of Vinodol, Ogulin, Brinje, Otočac, the area around Duga Resa, part of Central and Northeastern Istria (including Čičarija dialect in Slovenian part), and Municipality of Kostanjevica na Krki (Oštrc, Črešnjevec pri Oštrcu, Črneča Vas, Vrtača, Vrbje) in Slovenia.

This dialect is peculiar for its mixed Ikavian–Ekavian reflex of Common Slavic yat vowel, which was governed by Meyer–Jakubinskij's law.

== Bibliography ==
- Dalibor Brozović (1988). Čakavsko narječje; Jezik srpskohrvatski / hrvatskosrpski, hrvatski ili srpski (in Serbo-Croatian). Zagreb: JLZ Miroslav Krleža. ISBN 953-0-30225-8.
- Milčetić, Ivan (1895). "Čakavština Kvarnerskih otoka" [The Chakavian Dialect of the Kvarner Islands]. Rad Jugoslavenske akademije znanosti i umjetnosti: Filologičko-historički i filosofičko-juridički razredi (in Serbo-Croatian). 42. JAZU: 92–131.
