= Gusta =

Gusta may refer to:

- Gusta, a diminutive of the Russian male first name Avgust
- Gusta, a diminutive of the Russian female first name Avgusta
- Gusta, a diminutive of the Russian male first name Avgustin
- Gusta, a diminutive and colloquial form of the Russian female first name Avgustina

== See also ==
- Aldona Gustas (b. 1932), Lithuanian-German poet and illustrator
- Giedrius Gustas (b. 1980), Lithuanian basketball player
- Gusto (disambiguation)
