= Gustya =

Gustya may refer to:

- Gustya, a diminutive of the Russian male first name Avgust
- Gustya, a diminutive of the Russian female first name Avgusta
- Gustya, a diminutive of the Russian male first name Avgustin
- Gustya, a diminutive of the Russian female first name Avgustina
