= Gutya =

Gutya may refer to:

- Gutya, a diminutive of the Russian male first name Avgust
- Gutya, a diminutive of the Russian female first name Avgusta
- Gutya, a diminutive of the Russian female first name Avgustina
