= Gusya =

Gusya may refer to:

- Gusya, a diminutive of the Russian female first name Avgusta
- Gusya, a diminutive of the Russian male first name Avgustin
- Gusya, a diminutive of the Russian female first name Avgustina
