= Avgustinka =

Avgustinka may refer to:

- Avgustinka, a diminutive of the Russian male first name Avgustin
- Avgustinka, a diminutive of the Russian female first name Avgustina
