= Zaboršt =

Zaboršt is a Slovene place name that may refer to:

- Zaboršt, Domžale, a village in the Municipality of Domžale, central Slovenia
- Zaboršt, Kostanjevica na Krki, a village in the Municipality of Kostanjevica na Krki, southeastern Slovenia
- Zaboršt, Škocjan, a village in the Municipality of Škocjan, southeastern Slovenia
- Zaboršt pri Dolu, a village in the Municipality of Dol pri Ljubljani, central Slovenia
- Zaboršt pri Šentvidu, a village in the Municipality of Ivančna Gorica, southeastern Slovenia
