= Globočica =

Globočica is a South Slavic toponym, that may refer to:

- Globočica, Moravče, Slovenia
- Globočica, Struga, North Macedonia
- Globočica, Dragaš, a settlement in the Gora region of Kosovo - see List of populated places in the municipality of Dragaš, Kosovo#Globočica
- Globočice pri Kostanjevici, named Globočica in some of the older sources
