= Dolšce =

Dolšce Dolšče (until 1990)
- Location in Slovenia
- Coordinates: 45°50′0.99″N 15°25′58.38″E
- Country: Slovenia
- Traditional region: Lower Carniola
- Statistical region: Lower Sava
- Municipality: Kostanjevica na Krki

Area
  - Total: 1.02 km^{2} (0.39 sq mi)
- Elevation: 267.2 m (877 ft)

Population (2002)
  - Total: 100
- Postal code: 8311

Dolšce (pronounced [ˈdoːu̯ʃtsɛ]; in older sources also Dolšice) is a settlement in the Municipality of Kostanjevica na Krki in eastern Slovenia. It lies in the foothills of the Gorjanci Hills, south of the town of Kostanjevica na Krki. The area is part of the traditional region of Lower Carniola. It is now included in the Lower Sava Statistical Region.

== Name ==
The name of the settlement was changed from Dolšče to Dolšce in 1990.
