= Kočarija =

- Location in Slovenia
- Coordinates: 45°49′53.31″N 15°24′3.86″E
- Country: Slovenia
- Traditional region: Lower Carniola
- Statistical region: Lower Sava
- Municipality: Kostanjevica na Krki

Area
  - Total: 1.01 km^{2} (0.39 sq mi)
- Elevation: 239.7 m (786 ft)

Population (2002)
  - Total: 63
- Postal code: 8311

Kočarija (pronounced [kɔtʃaˈɾiːja]) is a settlement in the foothills of the Gorjanci Hills southwest of the town of Kostanjevica na Krki in eastern Slovenia. The area is part of the traditional region of Lower Carniola and is now included in the Lower Sava Statistical Region.
