= Demšar =

Demšar is a surname. Notable people with the surname include:

- Avgust Demšar (born 1962), Slovenian writer
- Danijel Demšar (born 1954), Slovenian illustrator and painter
- Franci Demšar (born 1960), Slovenian physicist and politician
- Janez Demšar (born 1951), Slovenian ski jumper
- Ladislav Demšar (1929–1992), Serbian basketball player and coach
