= Grič, Kostanjevica na Krki =

Grič
- Location in Slovenia
- Coordinates: 45°49′48.98″N 15°24′37.65″E
- Country: Slovenia
- Traditional region: Lower Carniola
- Statistical region: Lower Sava
- Municipality: Kostanjevica na Krki

Area
  - Total: 0.5 km^{2} (0.19 sq mi)
- Elevation: 187.5 m (615 ft)

Population (2002)
  - Total: 38
- Postal code: 8311

Grič (pronounced [ˈɡɾiːtʃ]) is a small settlement in the foothills of the Gorjanci Hills south of Kostanjevica na Krki in eastern Slovenia. The area is part of the traditional region of Lower Carniola. It is now included in the Lower Sava Statistical Region.
