= Jablance, Kostanjevica na Krki =

Jablance Jablanice (until 1990)
- Location in Slovenia
- Coordinates: 45°50′36.78″N 15°26′41.29″E
- Country: Slovenia
- Traditional region: Lower Carniola
- Statistical region: Lower Sava
- Municipality: Kostanjevica na Krki

Area
  - Total: 1.24 km^{2} (0.48 sq mi)
- Elevation: 314.2 m (1,031 ft)

Population (2002)
  - Total: 48
- Postal code: 8311

Jablance (pronounced [ˈjaːblantsɛ]) is a settlement in the foothills of the Gorjanci Hills east of Kostanjevica na Krki in eastern Slovenia. The area is part of the traditional region of Lower Carniola. It is now included in the Lower Sava Statistical Region.

== Name ==
The name of the settlement was changed from Jablanice to Jablance in 1990.
