= Dragan Roller =

Croatian economist

- Born: June 11, 1922; Malence, Kingdom of Yugoslavia
- Died: April 29, 2003 (aged 80); Zagreb, Croatia
- Spouse(s): Gabrijela Kolar (m. 1946; div. 1948) Vesna Brovet (m. 1954)
- Awards: Partizanska Spomenica 1941 (Memorial Medal of Honour for Freedom Fighters of 1941)

Dragan Roller in 1978

Dragan Roller (11 June 1922 – 29 April 2003) was a Croatian economist, diplomat and Holocaust survivor. As a member of the antifascist youth movement in pre-WWII Yugoslavia, he was arrested and deported to the Jasenovac concentration camp in 1942. He survived three years in the camp. After the war, he completed a degree and PhD in economics and worked as a Yugoslav diplomat and United Nations economic advisor in the Middle East, Africa and the United States. He testified against the former commandant of the Jasenovac camp Dinko Šakić, who was tried for crimes against humanity and found guilty in 1999. Roller's experiences in the camp have been recorded for the SHOAH Foundation's archive at the University of Southern California in Los Angeles and in the memoir The Rooster: Discovering my Father's Memories of the Jasenovac Concentration Camp.

== Early life and family ==
Dragan Roller was born on 11 June 1922 in Malence, Kingdom of Yugoslavia (modern Slovenia) to Croatian parents Sabina and Dragutin Roller. He had an older sister Milena and younger brother Zlatko. The family moved often with the father's job as sawmill manager. Roller attended secondary school in Virovitica where he became politically active in the antifascist youth movement SKOJ (Savez Komunista Omladine Jugoslavije, Communist Youth League of Yugoslavia). At the time, this was an illegal organization, and members were subject to imprisonment, torture and execution.

Jasenovic Concentration Camp 1942-1945

Dragan started medical school in Zagreb in the Fall of 1940 but was arrested in November 1941 and sent to the Jasenovac concentration camp on 18 February 1942. He was sentenced to 3 months' forced labour but was held for three years. During his time in the camp, he was subjected to forced labour and starvation, his weight dropping from 85 kg to less than 50 kg. He contracted typhus in the camp but continued to work daily as those who were deemed too ill to work were executed. He was deported to a transit camp in Linz, Austria, in February 1945.

Education

After the American army liberated Linz in May 1945, Dragan returned to Zagreb to continue his studies, but he switched from Medicine to Economics. He graduated in 1948 and gained his PhD from the Faculty of Economics in Zagreb in 1951.

== Career ==
Roller worked as an assistant professor at the Faculty of Economics in Zagreb, Yugoslavia, until 1953 when he moved to the Foreign Office in Belgrade. His diplomatic work took him to Turkey and Greece, followed by spells in Iraq and Libya. He joined the United Nations in 1968. He was posted in Uganda for three years and moved to New York in 1971 as senior advisor in development economics. He retired from full-time work in 1982 but took on occasional consultancy assignments for the UN and the World Bank, and a Visiting Professorship at Alma College, Michigan. During his career, he published articles in his own name as well as under the pseudonym Petar Sabin (see Selected works).

Roller testified at the inquest (1998) and trial (1999) of Dinko Šakić, an Ustasha (Ustaša in Croatian) officer of the Independent State of Croatia during World War II. Šakić rose to the rank of commandant at the Jasenovac concentration camp in April 1944. Šakić was tried for war crimes and crimes against humanity, found guilty and sentenced to 20 years in prison. Roller was interviewed by many national and international media including the BBC, CBS and others. Roller was subsequently invited to record his oral testimony for the SHOAH Foundation's archive at the University of Southern California in Los Angeles. In his interview, Roller said that the Croatian government made a mistake by not trying Šakić for genocide instead of war crimes. He explained that Šakić was commander of a camp that was genocidal by design and therefore he should have been tried for genocide. Roller further explained how although there were political prisoners – like himself – the vast majority were imprisoned on a racial and ethnic basis: Jews, Serbs and Roma. "What does it mean to be a political prisoner? We communists were certainly political enemies of the fascist state of Croatia, as it was then. But the Serbian smallholder from Kozara mountain or the Jewish merchant from Zagreb were not enemies of the state. Their deaths were down to genocide," Roller concluded.

== Memoir ==
After Dragan Roller's death in 2003, his daughter Sibel Roller discovered a secret manuscript he had written about his experiences of the Jasenovac camp. She has combined his writing with other archival and personal documents, as well as her own memories of her father in a memoir of him. The Rooster: Discovering my Father's Memories of the Jasenovac Concentration Camp was published by Rowman & Littlefield (now Bloomsbury Academic and Professional) in 2024. The Croatian edition Putnik was published by Profil Knjiga in 2025.

== Selected works ==
- Roller, Dragan. Dokle je ekonomiku Poljske dovelo potčinjivanje SSSR-u. Vjesnik, No. 1463, 15 January 1950, pp 2–3. (In Croatian)
- Roller, Dragan. Saboteri socijalizma. Vjesnik, No. 1601, 26 June 1950, p 2. (In Croatian)
- Roller, Dragan. Trade relations in Dubrovnik in the 15th and 16th centuries. Dubrovački zanati u XV i XVI stoljeću. Yugoslav Academy of Sciences and Arts, Zagreb, 1951, 304 pp. (In Croatian)
- Roller, Dragan. Agricultural production in the Dubrovnik Republic from the 13th to the 15th century. Agrarno-proizvodni odnosi na području Dubrovačke Republike od XIII do XV stoljeća. Yugoslav Academy of Sciences and Arts, Zagreb, 1955, 372 pp. (In Croatian)
- Roller, Dragan. Međunarodna socijalistička podjela rada. Ekonomski pregled, Vol. 7. Ekonomski institut Zagreb, 1964. (In Croatian)
- Roller, Dragan alias Petar Sabin. Dugovi i potrošnja. Ekonomska politika, May 1965, 518–549. (In Croatian)
- Roller, Dragan. Skojevci medicinari. Zbornik sjećanja. Drugi Svezak. Institut za historiju radničkog pokreta Hrvatske. Školska Knjiga, Zagreb 1983. (In Croatian)
