= Gornja Prekopa =

- Location in Slovenia
- Coordinates: 45°50′58.41″N 15°22′33.94″E
- Country: Slovenia
- Traditional region: Lower Carniola
- Statistical region: Lower Sava
- Municipality: Kostanjevica na Krki

Area
  - Total: 1.37 km^{2} (0.53 sq mi)
- Elevation: 160.4 m (526 ft)

Population (2002)
  - Total: 107
- Postal code: 8311

Gornja Prekopa (pronounced [ˈɡoːɾnja ˈpɾeːkɔpa]; in older sources also Gorenje Prekope, German: Oberprekope) is a settlement west of Kostanjevica na Krki in eastern Slovenia. The area is part of the traditional region of Lower Carniola. It is now included in the Lower Sava Statistical Region.

There is a small chapel-shrine in the centre of the village. It is dedicated to the Virgin Mary and was built in the early 20th century.
