= Globočice pri Kostanjevici =

- Location in Slovenia
- Coordinates: 45°50′20.5″N 15°25′38.6″E
- Country: Slovenia
- Traditional region: Lower Carniola
- Statistical region: Lower Sava
- Municipality: Kostanjevica na Krki

Area
  - Total: 0.63 km^{2} (0.24 sq mi)
- Elevation: 171.3 m (562 ft)

Population (2002)
  - Total: 107
- Postal code: 8311

Globočice pri Kostanjevici (pronounced [ɡlɔbɔˈtʃiːtsɛ pɾi kɔˈstaːnjɛʋitsa]; in older sources also Globočica, German: Globoschitz) is a settlement southeast of Kostanjevica na Krki in eastern Slovenia. The area is part of the traditional region of Lower Carniola. It is now included in the Lower Sava Statistical Region. The settlement includes the hamlets of Slinovce, Banji Vrh, and Žaga. An estate known as Švajcarija (German: Schweizerhaus) was abandoned after the Second World War.

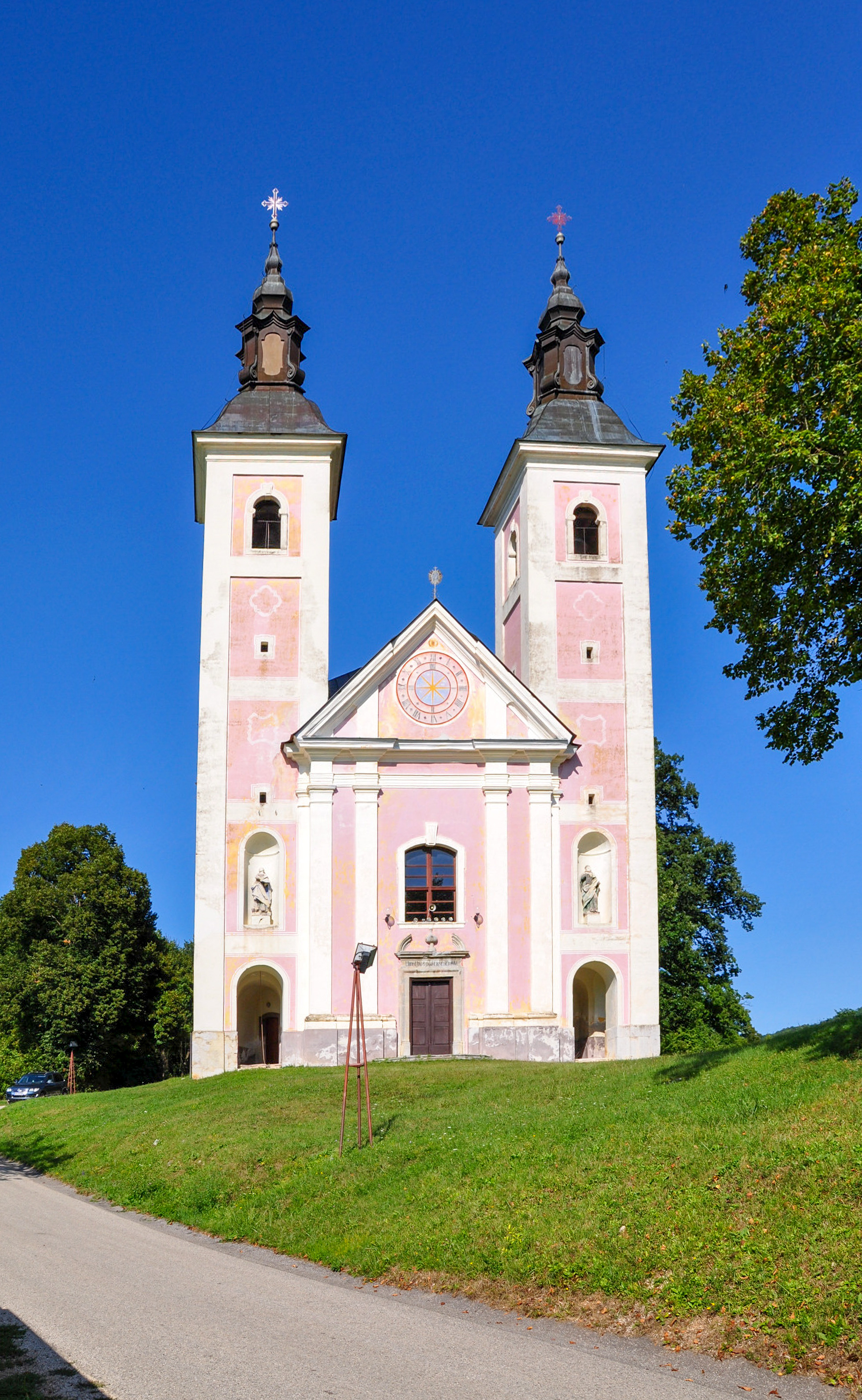
Our Lady of Good Counsel Church

The local church, built in Slinovce by the Cistercians from the Kostanjevica na Krki Monastery, is dedicated to the Our Lady of Good Counsel and belongs to the Parish of Kostanjevica na Krki. It was built in 1778 and its interior was painted in 1892.
