= Karlče =

- Location in Slovenia
- Coordinates: 45°51′21.56″N 15°26′20.79″E
- Country: Slovenia
- Traditional region: Lower Carniola
- Statistical region: Lower Sava
- Municipality: Kostanjevica na Krki

Area
  - Total: 0.18 km^{2} (0.069 sq mi)
- Elevation: 149.9 m (492 ft)

Population (2002)
  - Total: 11
- Postal code: 8311

Karlče (pronounced [ˈkaːɾltʃɛ]) is a small settlement on the right bank of the Krka River in the Municipality of Kostanjevica na Krki in eastern Slovenia. The area is part of the traditional region of Lower Carniola. It is now included in the Lower Sava Statistical Region.
