= Dobe, Kostanjevica na Krki =

Dobe
- Location in Slovenia
- Coordinates: 45°50′58.05″N 15°24′16.84″E
- Country: Slovenia
- Traditional region: Lower Carniola
- Statistical region: Lower Sava
- Municipality: Kostanjevica na Krki

Area
  - Total: 1.91 km^{2} (0.74 sq mi)
- Elevation: 160.1 m (525 ft)

Population (2002)
  - Total: 88
- Postal code: 8311

Dobe (pronounced [ˈdoːbɛ]) is a settlement on the right bank of the Krka River in the Municipality of Kostanjevica na Krki in eastern Slovenia. The area is part of the traditional region of Lower Carniola. It is now included in the Lower Sava Statistical Region.

Graves from the Bronze Age, Early Iron Age, and the Roman period have been found near the settlement.
