= Dolnja Prekopa =

- Location in Slovenia
- Coordinates: 45°51′13.25″N 15°22′52.12″E
- Country: Slovenia
- Traditional region: Lower Carniola
- Statistical region: Lower Sava
- Municipality: Kostanjevica na Krki

Area
  - Total: 1.12 km^{2} (0.43 sq mi)
- Elevation: 158 m (518 ft)

Population (2002)
  - Total: 236
- Postal code: 8311

Dolnja Prekopa (pronounced [ˈdoːlnja ˈpɾeːkɔpa]; in older sources also Dolenje Prekope, German: Unterprekope) is a settlement in the Municipality of Kostanjevica na Krki in eastern Slovenia. The area is part of the traditional region of Lower Carniola. It is now included in the Lower Sava Statistical Region.

There is a small chapel-shrine in the village. It was built in the early 20th century.
