= Podstrm =

- Location in Slovenia
- Coordinates: 45°49′26.38″N 15°24′15.71″E
- Country: Slovenia
- Traditional region: Lower Carniola
- Statistical region: Lower Sava
- Municipality: Kostanjevica na Krki

Area
  - Total: 0.2 km^{2} (0.077 sq mi)
- Elevation: 312.9 m (1,027 ft)

Population (2002)
  - Total: 16
- Postal code: 8311

Podstrm (pronounced [pɔtˈstəɾm]) is a small settlement in the foothills of the Gorjanci Mountains in the Municipality of Kostanjevica na Krki in eastern Slovenia. The area is part of the traditional region of Lower Carniola and is now included in the Lower Sava Statistical Region.
