= Zaboršt, Kostanjevica na Krki =

Zaboršt
- Location in Slovenia
- Coordinates: 45°50′22.71″N 15°24′27.71″E
- Country: Slovenia
- Traditional region: Lower Carniola
- Statistical region: Lower Sava
- Municipality: Kostanjevica na Krki

Area
  - Total: 1.5 km^{2} (0.58 sq mi)
- Elevation: 184.1 m (604 ft)

Population (2002)
  - Total: 18
- Postal code: 8311

Zaboršt (pronounced [zaˈbɔɾʃt]) is a small settlement west of the town of Kostanjevica na Krki in eastern Slovenia. The area is part of the traditional region of Lower Carniola and is now included in the Lower Sava Statistical Region.
