= Sajevce, Kostanjevica na Krki =

Sajevce
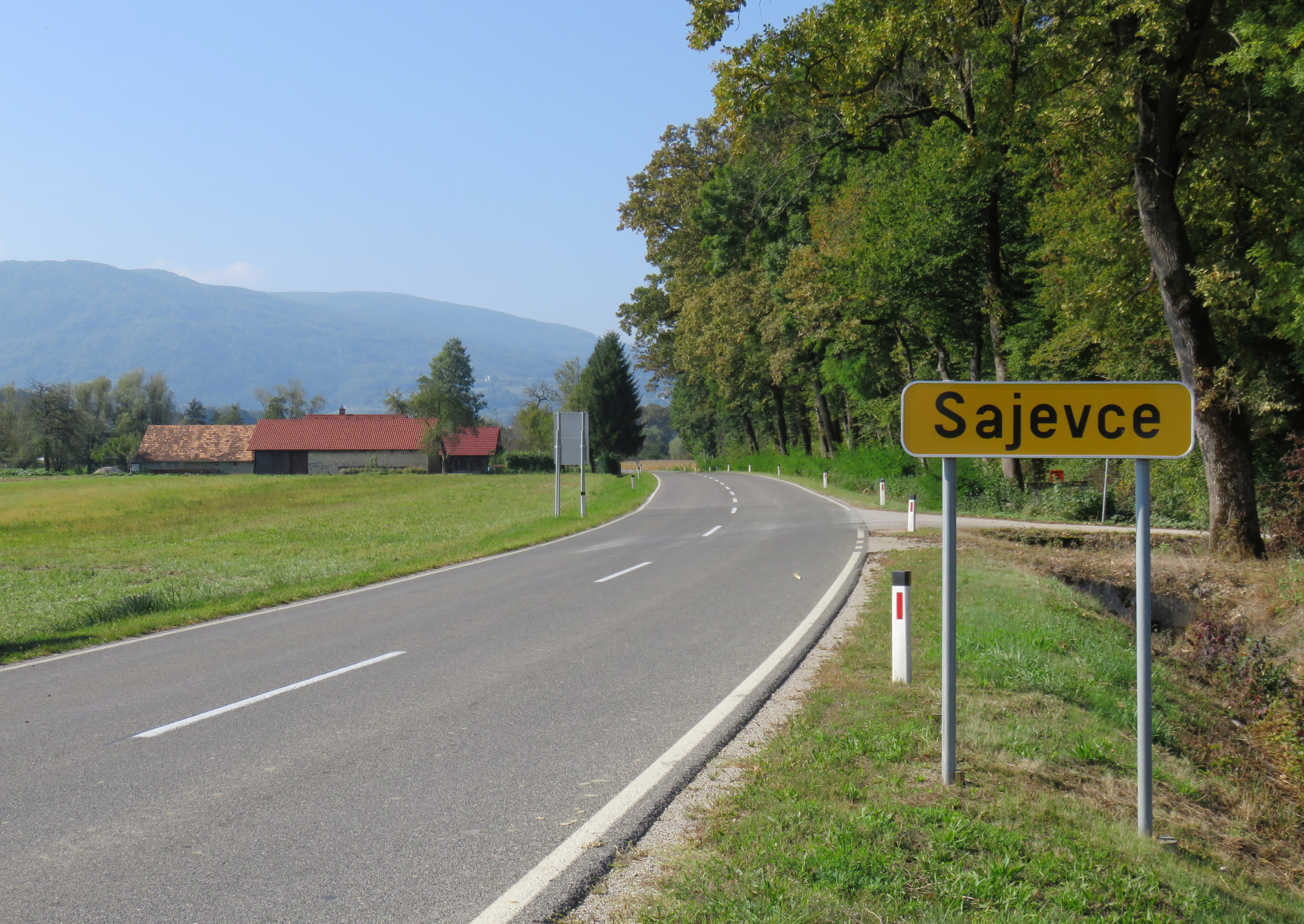

- Location in Slovenia
- Coordinates: 45°51′28.74″N 15°26′8.79″E
- Country: Slovenia
- Traditional region: Lower Carniola
- Statistical region: Lower Sava
- Municipality: Kostanjevica na Krki

Area
  - Total: 3.71 km^{2} (1.43 sq mi)
- Elevation: 151.6 m (497 ft)

Population (2002)
  - Total: 29
- Postal code: 8311

Sajevce (pronounced [ˈsaːjɛu̯tsɛ]) is a small settlement in the Municipality of Kostanjevica na Krki in eastern Slovenia. The area is part of the traditional region of Lower Carniola and is now included in the Lower Sava Statistical Region.

== Geography ==
Sajevce lies on the left bank of the Krka River, at the southeastern edge of the Krakovo Forest. The village consists of three hamlets: Male Sajevce (literally, 'little Sajevce') is mostly fields and meadows and lies to the southwest, between the road and the Krka River; Velike Sajevce (literally, 'big Sajevce') is the village's population center to the northeast; and Poljane, with only one house, lies to the north surrounded by forest. Sajevec Creek, a tributary of the Krka, flows out of the forest and past the southwestern edge of the village. The soil is loamy.

== Name ==
Sajevce was attested in historical sources between 1295 and 1307 as Ruspach. The medieval German name is a compound of the Middle High German element ruoʒ 'soot(y), black' + bach 'creek', probably referring to the dark soil that the creek runs through or its turbid water (cf. also Sajevec, attested as Růzpach). The Slovene name Sajevce contains the root saje 'soot', semantically corresponding to the medieval German name.

== History ==
A prehistoric burial ground has been found near the settlement, attesting to early settlement in the area. It dates to the Early Iron Age and numbers 22 clearly defined and still visible tumuli between 15 and 20 m in diameter and 2 m high.

During the Second World War, German forces evicted the population from the village. The farms remained vacant for the remainder of the war and fell into disrepair.

=== Mass grave ===
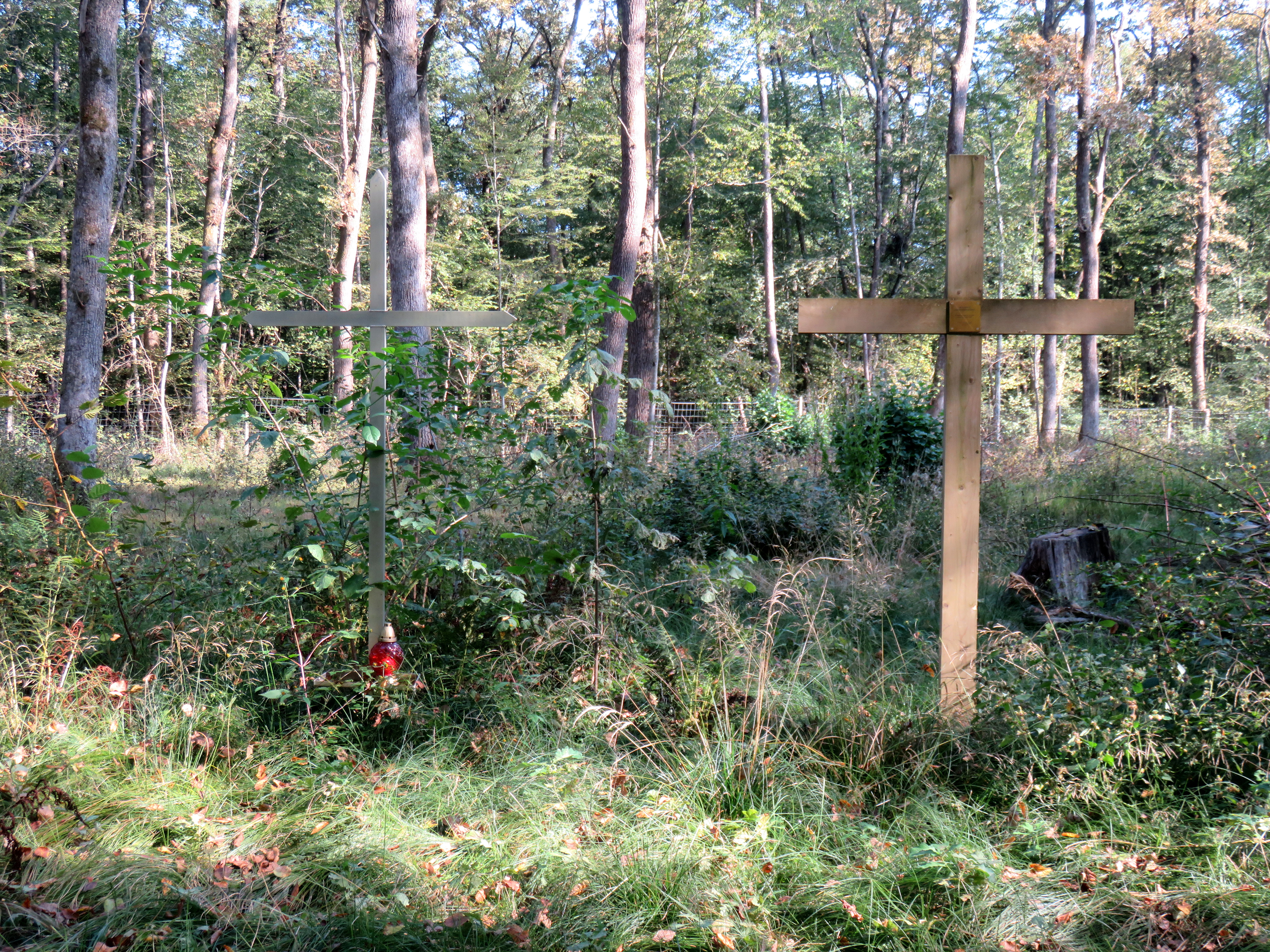
Krakovo Forest 1 Mass Grave

Sajevce is the location of one of two known mass graves in the Krakovo Forest associated with the Second World War. The sites consist of 10 large mounds and contain the remains of an undetermined number of Croatian prisoners of war, civilians, and possibly German soldiers as well. The Krakovo Forest 1 Mass Grave (Slovene: Grobišče Krakovski gozd 1) is located in the woods about 250 meters (820 ft) northeast of the Ponikvar farm. The grave site was created simultaneously with the Krakovo Forest 2 Mass Grave (Slovene: Grobišče Krakovski gozd 2) in neighboring Kostanjevica na Krki. The two sites were created around May 15, 1945, when Partisan forces captured about 4,000 Croatian soldiers and civilians at Dobruška Vas fleeing toward Austria. They were held on the left bank of the Krka River and killed in the forest over the course of a few days; eyewitnesses stated that the victims included children, women, and elderly persons.
