= Slinovce =

- Location in Slovenia
- Coordinates: 45°51′1.49″N 15°26′16.92″E
- Country: Slovenia
- Traditional region: Lower Carniola
- Statistical region: Lower Sava
- Municipality: Kostanjevica na Krki

Area
  - Total: 1.22 km^{2} (0.47 sq mi)
- Elevation: 198.5 m (651 ft)

Population (2002)
  - Total: 42
- Postal code: 8311

Slinovce (pronounced [ˈsliːnɔu̯tsɛ]) is a dispersed settlement in the low hills on the right bank of the Krka River in the Municipality of Kostanjevica na Krki in eastern Slovenia. The area is part of the traditional region of Lower Carniola and is now included in the Lower Sava Statistical Region.

There is a small chapel-shrine at the crossroads west of the settlement. It is dedicated to the Virgin Mary and was built in the early 20th century.
