= Ivanjše =

- Location in Slovenia
- Coordinates: 45°49′44.81″N 15°24′26.04″E
- Country: Slovenia
- Traditional region: Lower Carniola
- Statistical region: Lower Sava
- Municipality: Kostanjevica na Krki

Area
  - Total: 0.24 km^{2} (0.093 sq mi)
- Elevation: 227 m (745 ft)

Population (2002)
  - Total: 17
- Postal code: 8311

Ivanjše (pronounced [iˈʋaːnʃɛ]) is a small settlement in the foothills of the Gorjanci Hills in the Municipality of Kostanjevica na Krki in eastern Slovenia. The area is part of the traditional region of Lower Carniola. It is now included in the Lower Sava Statistical Region.

There is a small chapel-shrine in the southern part of the settlement. It is dedicated to the Virgin Mary and was built in the early 20th century.
