= Dobrava pri Kostanjevici =

- Location in Slovenia
- Coordinates: 45°51′17.35″N 15°23′23.67″E
- Country: Slovenia
- Traditional region: Lower Carniola
- Statistical region: Lower Sava
- Municipality: Kostanjevica na Krki

Area
  - Total: 0.72 km^{2} (0.28 sq mi)
- Elevation: 158.1 m (519 ft)

Population (2002)
  - Total: 36
- Postal code: 8311

Dobrava pri Kostanjevici (pronounced [dɔˈbɾaːʋa pɾi kɔˈstaːnjɛʋitsa]) is a settlement on the right bank of the Krka River in the Municipality of Kostanjevica na Krki in eastern Slovenia. The area is part of the traditional region of Lower Carniola. It is now included in the Lower Sava Statistical Region.

== Name ==
The name of the settlement was changed from Dobrava to Dobrava pri Kostanjevici in 1953.

== Gutenhof Manor ==
Gutenhof Manor is an Early Baroque mansion with a surrounding park in the settlement. It used to belong to the monastery in Kostanjevica. The manor was first mentioned in written sources in 1536. Over the following centuries, it changed hands many times and was frequently renovated. It came under the ownership of Ivan Globočnik, the mayor of Kostanjevica, at the end of the 19th century and thus acquired the local name Globočnik Castle (Slovene: Globočnikov grad). The building was burned by the Partisans in 1942, but the damage was relatively minor and the private owner was able to live there until the end of the Second World War. The last private owner was Pavel Majcen. After this, the property was taken over by the Agrokombinat collective farm, which radically altered the building's structure and also cut down its grove of trees, known as the Castle Woods (Grajski boršč).

== Other cultural heritage ==
There is also a small chapel-shrine in the village. It is dedicated to the Virgin Mary and was built in the early 20th century.
