= Velike Vodenice =

- Location in Slovenia
- Coordinates: 45°49′39.26″N 15°23′15.15″E
- Country: Slovenia
- Traditional region: Lower Carniola
- Statistical region: Lower Sava
- Municipality: Kostanjevica na Krki

Area
  - Total: 0.82 km^{2} (0.32 sq mi)
- Elevation: 380.6 m (1,249 ft)

Population (2002)
  - Total: 51
- Postal code: 8311

Velike Vodenice (pronounced [ˈʋeːlikɛ ʋɔdɛˈniːtsɛ]; German: Großwodenitz) is a settlement in the foothills of the Gorjanci range in the Municipality of Kostanjevica na Krki in eastern Slovenia. The area is part of the traditional region of Lower Carniola and is now included in the Lower Sava Statistical Region.

There is a small chapel-shrine with a bell tower above its entrance at the crossroads in the centre of the village. It is dedicated to the Virgin Mary and was built in the early 20th century.
