= Male Vodenice =

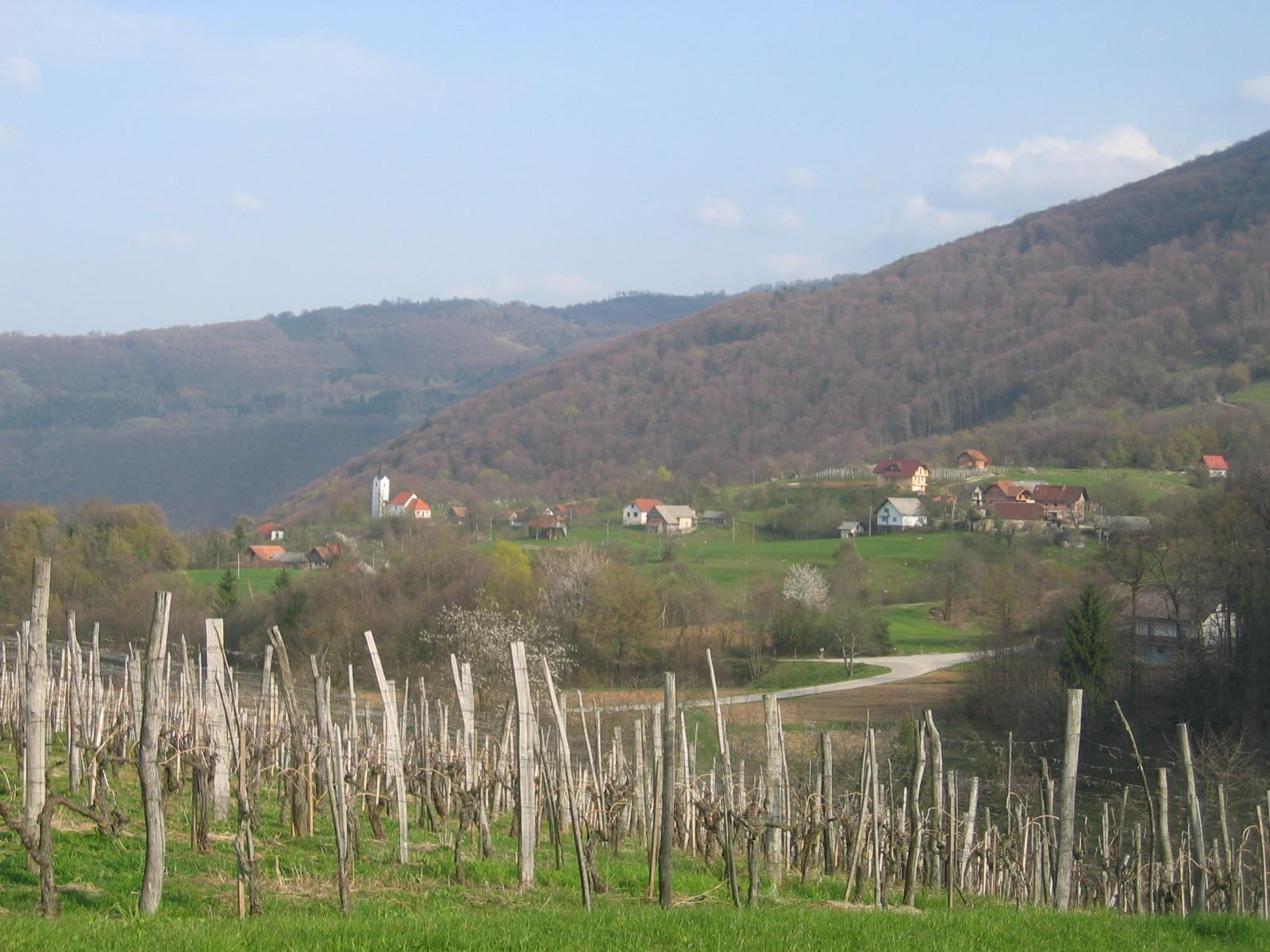

- Location in Slovenia
- Coordinates: 45°49′27.47″N 15°23′43.29″E
- Country: Slovenia
- Traditional region: Lower Carniola
- Statistical region: Lower Sava
- Municipality: Kostanjevica na Krki

Area
  - Total: 5.6 km^{2} (2.2 sq mi)
- Elevation: 387.4 m (1,271 ft)

Population (2002)
  - Total: 33
- Postal code: 8311

Male Vodenice (pronounced [ˈmaːlɛ ʋɔdɛˈniːtsɛ]; German: Kleinwodenitz) is a settlement in the Gorjanci Hills in the Municipality of Kostanjevica na Krki in eastern Slovenia. Its territory extends right to the border with Croatia. The area is part of the traditional region of Lower Carniola. It is now included in the Lower Sava Statistical Region.

The local church, built on a hill east of the main settlement, is dedicated to the Virgin Mary and belongs to the Parish of Kostanjevica na Krki. It is a 14th-century Gothic building with a belfry. Its main and side altars date to the 18th century.
