= Koprivnik, Kostanjevica na Krki =

Koprivnik
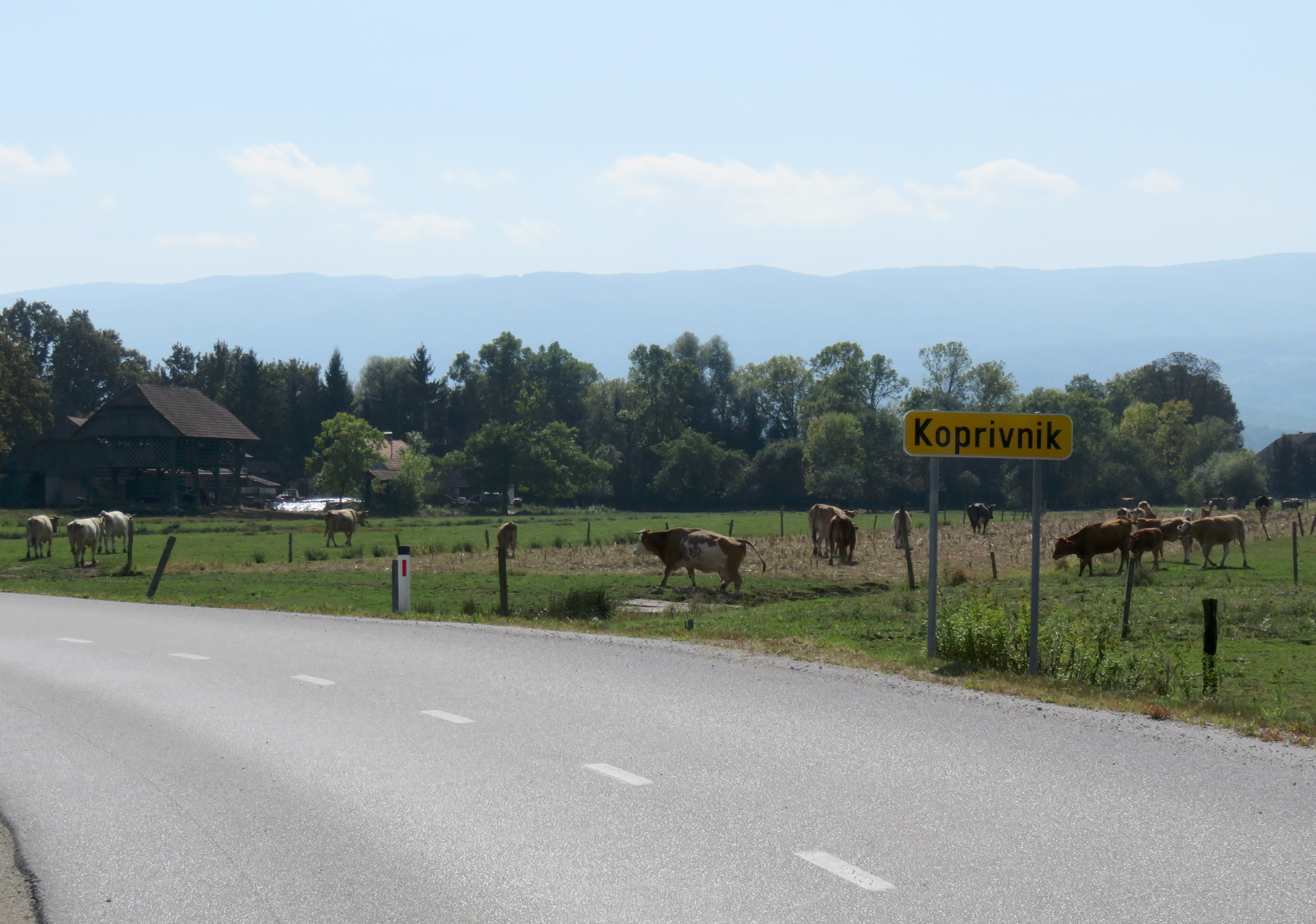

- Location in Slovenia
- Coordinates: 45°52′40.05″N 15°22′54.57″E
- Country: Slovenia
- Traditional region: Lower Carniola
- Statistical region: Lower Sava
- Municipality: Kostanjevica na Krki

Area
  - Total: 7.39 km^{2} (2.85 sq mi)
- Elevation: 152.1 m (499 ft)

Population (2002)
  - Total: 13
- Postal code: 8311

Koprivnik (pronounced [kɔˈpɾíːwnik]) is a settlement on the left bank of the Krka River in the Municipality of Kostanjevica na Krki in eastern Slovenia. The area is part of the traditional region of Lower Carniola. It is now included in the Lower Sava Statistical Region.

Roman graves and remains of a bridge over the Krka have been excavated in the vicinity of the settlement.
