= Gusto =

Gusto, El Gusto or GUSTO may refer to:

== Arts and entertainment ==
- Gusto!, an album by the American punk rock group Guttermouth
- Gusto (producer), an American house music DJ/producer
- El Gusto, a 2012 Franco-Irish-Algerian documentary film
- Gusto, a gangster in the American comedy film CB4
- Augustus "Gusto" Gummi, a character in the animated TV series Adventures of the Gummi Bears
- Gusto (TV channel), a Canadian TV channel
- Gusto (TV program), a Russian culinary entertainment program that has aired since 1993
- Gusto Records, an American record label
- Gusto Records (UK label), an imprint of defunct British record label Gut Records
- Gusto (song), a single by Filipino singer-songwriter Zack Tabudlo with Al James

== Other uses ==
- Gusto (company), a payroll and healthcare software provider
- Gusto Shipyard, Schiedam, Netherlands, closed in 1978
- Malo Gusto (born 2003), French footballer
- Ryan Gusto (born 1999), American baseball player
- GUSTO, short for Galactic / Extragalactic ULDB Spectroscopic Terahertz Observatory, a high-altitude balloon mission that carried an infrared telescope
- Project Gusto, a committee formed in 1957 to consider replacement candidates for the U2 reconnaissance airplane

== See also ==
- Gusta (disambiguation)
- Auguste Gusteau, a character in the Pixar animated film Ratatouille
