= Ržišče, Kostanjevica na Krki =

Ržišče
- Location in Slovenia
- Coordinates: 45°49′33.14″N 15°22′54.68″E
- Country: Slovenia
- Traditional region: Lower Carniola
- Statistical region: Lower Sava
- Municipality: Kostanjevica na Krki

Area
  - Total: 1.36 km^{2} (0.53 sq mi)
- Elevation: 409.9 m (1,345 ft)

Population (2002)
  - Total: 22
- Postal code: 8311

Ržišče (pronounced [əɾˈʒiːʃtʃɛ]; German: Arschische) is a settlement in the foothills of the Gorjanci Hills in the Municipality of Kostanjevica na Krki in eastern Slovenia. The area is part of the traditional region of Lower Carniola and is now included in the Lower Sava Statistical Region.

The local church is dedicated to the Mary Magdalene and belongs to the Parish of Kostanjevica na Krki. It is a 13th-century Late Romanesque building with a rectangular nave with a flat ceiling and a barrel-vaulted sanctuary.
