= Municipality of Kostanjevica na Krki =

Municipality of Slovenia

Municipality of Kostanjevica na Krki Občina Kostanjevica na Krki
- Municipality
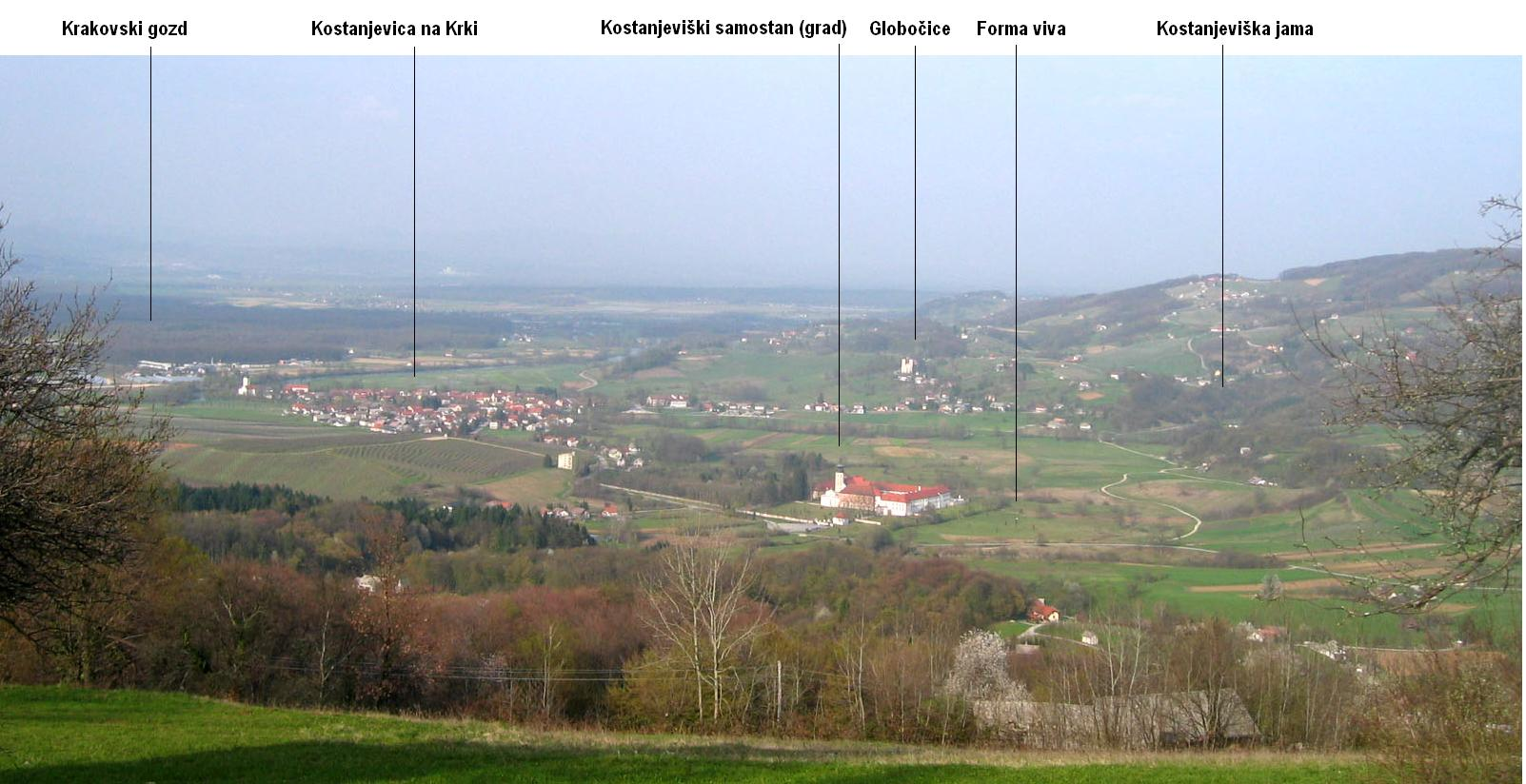
- View of the Municipality of Kostanjevica na Krki from the village of Male Vodenice

- Location of the Municipality of Kostanjevica na Krki in Slovenia
- Coordinates: 45°51′N 15°25′E
- Country: Slovenia

Government
  - Mayor: Robert Zagorc (Independent)
- Elevation: 150.4 m (493 ft)

Population (2002)
  - Total: 751
- Time zone: UTC+01 (CET)
  - Summer (DST): UTC+02 (CEST)
- Postal code: 8311
- Website: www.kostanjevica.si
- Source: Statistical Office of the Republic of Slovenia, census of 2002.

The Municipality of Kostanjevica na Krki (pronounced [kɔˈstaːnjɛʋitsa na ˈkəɾki]; Slovene: Občina Kostanjevica na Krki) is a municipality in the traditional Lower Carniola region of southern Slovenia. The seat of the municipality is the town of Kostanjevica na Krki. It is part of the Lower Sava Statistical Region. It is located in the northern foothills of the Gorjanci Mountains and extends to the border with Croatia. It borders Croatia.

== Settlements ==
In addition to the municipal seat of Kostanjevica na Krki, the municipality also includes the following settlements:

- Avguštine
- Črešnjevec pri Oštrcu
- Črneča Vas
- Dobe
- Dobrava pri Kostanjevici
- Dolnja Prekopa
- Dolšce
- Globočice pri Kostanjevici
- Gornja Prekopa
- Grič
- Ivanjše
- Jablance
- Karlče
- Kočarija
- Koprivnik
- Male Vodenice
- Malence
- Orehovec
- Oštrc
- Podstrm
- Ržišče
- Sajevce
- Slinovce
- Velike Vodenice
- Vrbje
- Vrtača
- Zaboršt
