= Črešnjevec pri Oštrcu =

- Location in Slovenia
- Coordinates: 45°49′21.55″N 15°27′2″E
- Country: Slovenia
- Traditional region: Lower Carniola
- Statistical region: Lower Sava
- Municipality: Kostanjevica na Krki

Area
  - Total: 7.07 km^{2} (2.73 sq mi)
- Elevation: 417 m (1,368 ft)

Population (2002)
  - Total: 24
- Postal code: 8311

Črešnjevec pri Oštrcu (pronounced [ˈtʃɾeːʃnjɛʋəts pɾi ɔˈʃtəɾtsu]; German: Kerschdorf) is a settlement in the Gorjanci Hills in the Municipality of Kostanjevica na Krki in eastern Slovenia. Its territory extends right to the border with Croatia. The area is part of the traditional region of Lower Carniola. It is now included in the Lower Sava Statistical Region.

== Name ==
The name of the settlement was changed from Črešnjevec to Črešnjevec pri Oštrcu in 1953. In the past the German name was Kerschdorf.
