= Črneča Vas =

- Location in Slovenia
- Coordinates: 45°49′41.84″N 15°27′31.82″E
- Country: Slovenia
- Traditional region: Lower Carniola
- Statistical region: Lower Sava
- Municipality: Kostanjevica na Krki

Area
  - Total: 5.84 km^{2} (2.25 sq mi)
- Elevation: 375.7 m (1,233 ft)

Population (2002)
  - Total: 141
- Postal code: 8311

Črneča Vas (pronounced [tʃəɾˈneːtʃa ˈʋaːs]; German: Scheerendorf) is a settlement in the Municipality of Kostanjevica na Krki in eastern Slovenia. It lies in the Gorjanci hills close to the border with Croatia. The area is part of the traditional region of Lower Carniola. It is now included in the Lower Sava Statistical Region.

The local church, built on a hill northwest of the main settlement, is dedicated to Saints Hermagoras and Fortunatus and belongs to the Parish of Kostanjevica na Krki. It has a rectangular barrel vaulted nave with a three-sided apse and dates to the late 16th century.
