= Globočica, Moravče =

Globočica
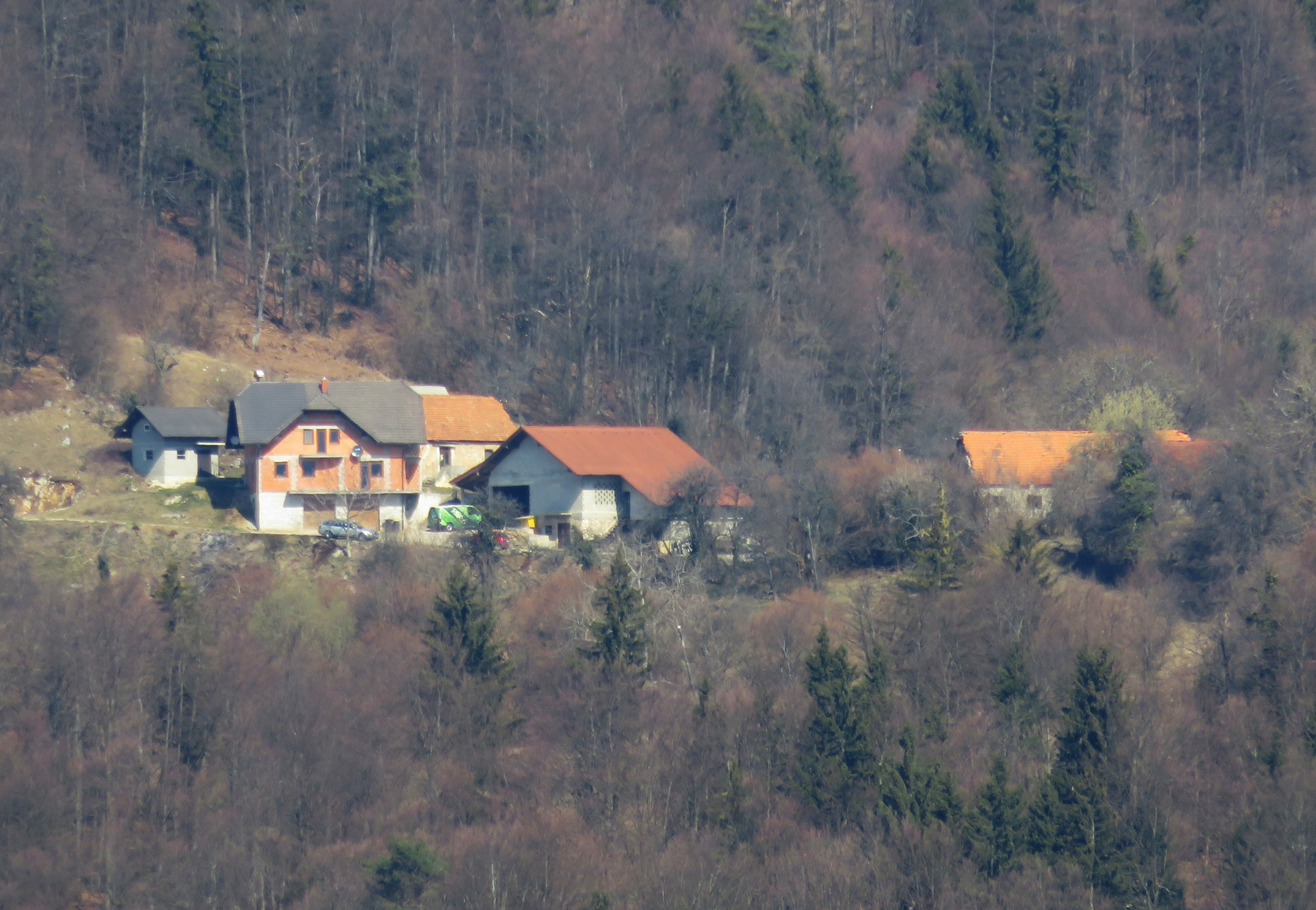

- Location in Slovenia
- Coordinates: 46°9′15″N 14°46′41″E
- Country: Slovenia
- Traditional region: Upper Carniola
- Statistical region: Central Slovenia
- Municipality: Moravče
- Elevation: 380 m (1,250 ft)

Globočica (Slovene pronunciation: [ɡlɔbɔˈtʃiːtsa], sometimes Globočice) is a former settlement in the Municipality of Moravče in central Slovenia. It is now part of the village of Limbarska Gora. The area is part of the traditional region of Upper Carniola. The municipality is now included in the Central Slovenia Statistical Region.

== Geography ==
Globočica lies in the southeastern part of the village of Limbarska Gora, on the southeast slope of the hill ascending to the main settlement.

== History ==
Globočica had a population of 14 living in three houses in 1900. Globočica was annexed by Limbarska Gora (at that time still called Sveti Valentin) in 1952, ending its existence as an independent settlement.
