= Vrbje, Kostanjevica na Krki =

Vrbje
- Location in Slovenia
- Coordinates: 45°49′28.7″N 15°28′15.73″E
- Country: Slovenia
- Traditional region: Lower Carniola
- Statistical region: Lower Sava
- Municipality: Kostanjevica na Krki

Area
  - Total: 0.71 km^{2} (0.27 sq mi)
- Elevation: 449.9 m (1,476 ft)

Population (2002)
  - Total: 13
- Postal code: 8311

Vrbje (pronounced [ˈʋəɾbjɛ]) is a small settlement in the Gorjanci Hills in the Municipality of Kostanjevica na Krki in eastern Slovenia, next to the border with Croatia. The area is part of the traditional region of Lower Carniola. It is now included in the Lower Sava Statistical Region.
