= Vrtača, Kostanjevica na Krki =

Vrtača
- Location in Slovenia
- Coordinates: 45°49′20.66″N 15°28′2.23″E
- Country: Slovenia
- Traditional region: Lower Carniola
- Statistical region: Lower Sava
- Municipality: Kostanjevica na Krki

Area
  - Total: 0.5 km^{2} (0.19 sq mi)
- Elevation: 400.7 m (1,315 ft)

Population (2002)
  - Total: 9
- Postal code: 8311

Vrtača (pronounced [ʋəɾˈtaːtʃa]) is a small remote settlement in the Gorjanci Mountains in the Municipality of Kostanjevica na Krki in eastern Slovenia, right on the border with Croatia. The area is part of the traditional region of Lower Carniola. It is now included in the Lower Sava Statistical Region.
