= Avgust =

Russian masculine given name

In Russian, Avgust (Russian: А́вгуст or Авгу́ст) is a male given name. Its feminine versions are Avgusta and Avgustina. The name is derived from the Latin word augustus, which means majestic, but originally meant devoted to an augur (a priest who practiced augury, interpreting the will of the gods by studying the flight of birds).

The name was included into various, often handwritten, church calendars throughout the 17th–19th centuries, but was omitted from the official Synodal Menologium at the end of the 19th century. From 1924 to 1930, the name was included into various Soviet calendars, which included the new and often artificially created names promoting the new Soviet realities and encouraging the break with the tradition of using the names in the Synodal Menologia.

Its diminutives include Ava (А́ва), Gutya (Гу́тя), Gusta (Гу́ста), Gustya (Гу́стя), and Gustey (Густе́й).

The patronymics derived from "Avgust" are "А́вгустович" (Avgustovich; masculine) and "А́вгустовна" (Avgustovna; feminine).

"Avgust" is also a colloquial form of the given name Avgustin.

== People with the name ==
- Avgust Černigoj (1898–1985), Slovenian/Yugoslavian painter, avant-garde experimenter in Constructivism
- Avgust Demšar, (born 1962), Slovenian detective fiction writer
- Avgust Ipavec (born 1940), Slovenian composer and priest
- Avgust Pavel, Slovenian spelling of the name of Ágoston Pável (born 1886), Hungarian Slovene writer, poet, ethnologist, linguist, and historian
- Avgust Pirjevec (1887–1944), Slovene literary scholar, lexicographer, and librarian
- Avgust Tsivolko (1810–1839), Russian navigator and Arctic explorer

== See also ==
- August (disambiguation)
- Avguštine
- Sebastian (name)
