= Malence =

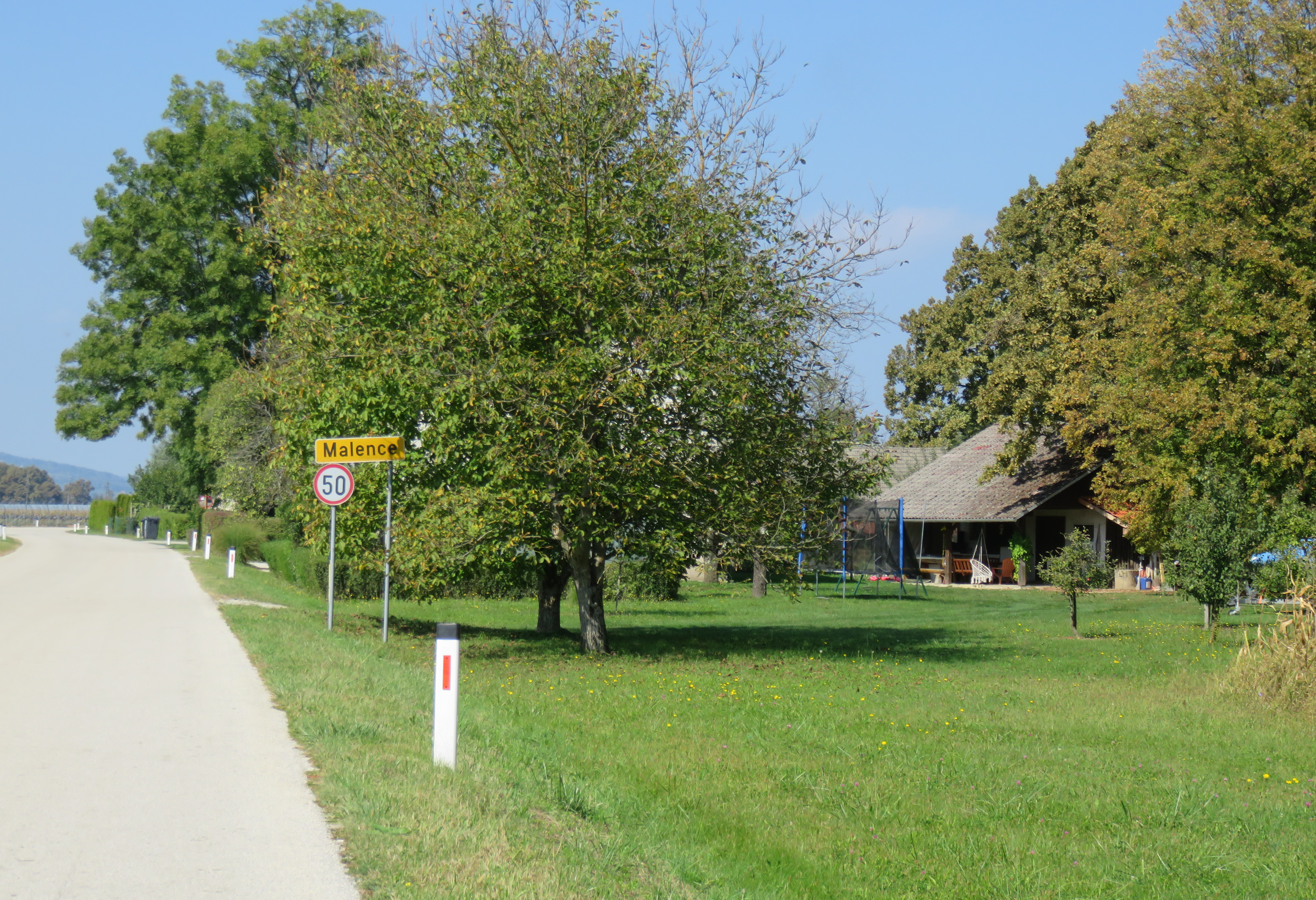

- Location in Slovenia
- Coordinates: 45°51′29.85″N 15°24′0.85″E
- Country: Slovenia
- Traditional region: Lower Carniola
- Statistical region: Lower Sava
- Municipality: Kostanjevica na Krki

Area
  - Total: 3.64 km^{2} (1.41 sq mi)
- Elevation: 151.7 m (498 ft)

Population (2002)
  - Total: 59
- Postal code: 8311

Malence (pronounced [ˈmaːlɛntsɛ]) is a settlement on the left bank of the Krka River in the Municipality of Kostanjevica na Krki in eastern Slovenia. The area is part of the traditional region of Lower Carniola. It is now included in the Lower Sava Statistical Region.

There is a memorial to 25 locals from Kostanjevica that were executed on the spot on 21 October 1943 by German forces during World War II.
