= Avguštin Stegenšek =

Slovene theologian and historian (1875–1920)

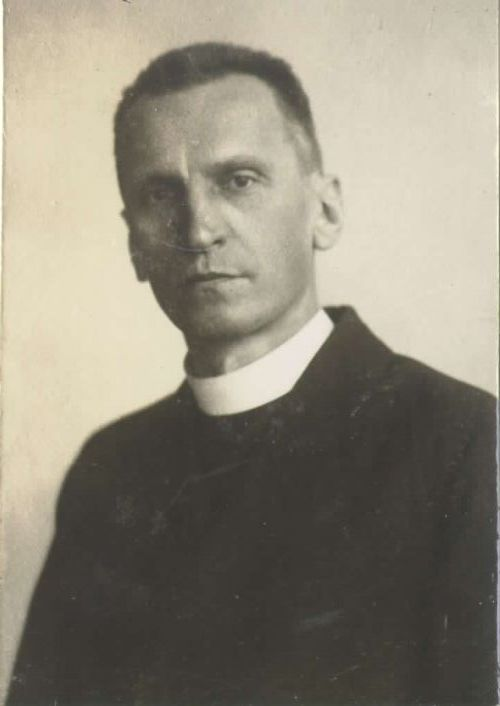
Avguštin Stegenšek

Avguštin Stegenšek (7 July 1875 in Tevče, Laško – 16 March 1920) was a Slovene theologian, philosopher and art historian.

After earning a bachelor's degree in theology, he left for Rome to study archaeology and art history, under the supervision of Joseph Wilpert. Later, he was awarded a doctor's degree of philosophy sciences at the university of Graz in 1906. He took part in the Historic Society for Slovene Styria, founded 1906, and was appointed honorary conservator in Styria by Committee for the Protection of Monuments in Vienna. Stegenšek was the pioneer of the monumental topography on the territory of Slovenia. He framed the monumental work Cerkveni spomeniki lavantinske škofije (Church Monuments of the Lavantine Diocese), which included two volumes: Dekanija Gornji Grad (The Deanery of Gornji Grad) and Konjiška Dekanija (The Deanery of Slovenske Konjice), illustrated with his own photographs and drawings and also edited and published by him.

Stegenšek died in Maribor in 1920.

== Works ==
- Dekanija Gornjegrajska COBISS 17588737 (1905)
- Konjiška dekanija COBISS 17588993 (1909).

In 2010, on the 101st anniversary of first publication and on the 90th anniversary of Stegešek's death, the volume Konjiška dekanija was reedited as a facsimile COBISS 250818048 by the Municipality of Slovenske Konjice, and Parish and Deanery Slovenske Konjice, with support from the Roman Catholic Archdiocese of Maribor.

== Additional reading ==
- Rebič, Adalbert, Splošni religijski leksikon, Ljubljana 2007, Modrijan ISBN 978-961-2411-83-1 COBISS 235261696
- Boldin Aleksandra, Dr. Avguštin Stegenšek in Konjiška dekanija, Slovenj Gradec 2010, Cerdonis (edited together with a facsimile of Konjiška dekanija) COBISS 250900480
