= Zaboršt pri Šentvidu =

Zaboršt pri Šentvidu Zaboršt (until 1953)
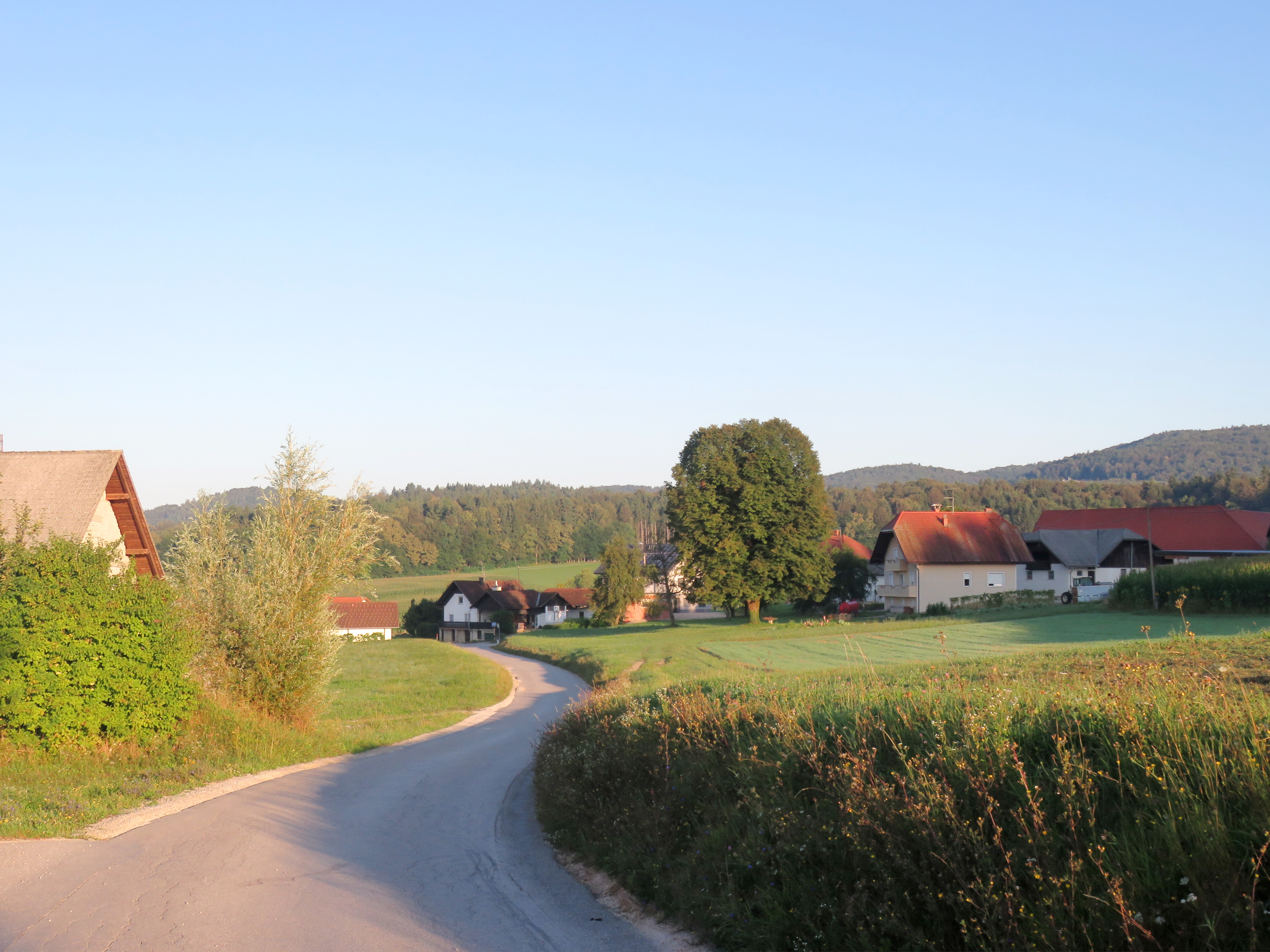

- Location in Slovenia
- Coordinates: 45°57′42.7″N 14°52′6.22″E
- Country: Slovenia
- Traditional region: Lower Carniola
- Statistical region: Central Slovenia
- Municipality: Ivančna Gorica

Area
  - Total: 1.31 km^{2} (0.51 sq mi)
- Elevation: 329.5 m (1,081 ft)

Population (2002)
  - Total: 92

Zaboršt pri Šentvidu (pronounced [zaˈbɔɾʃt pɾi ʃɛnˈtʋiːdu]; German: Saworst) is a settlement northeast of Šentvid pri Stični in the Municipality of Ivančna Gorica in central Slovenia. The area is part of the historical region of Lower Carniola. The municipality is now included in the Central Slovenia Statistical Region.

== Name ==
The name of the settlement was changed from Zaboršt to Zaboršt pri Šentvidu in 1953. In the past the German name was Saworst.

== Cultural heritage ==
A small roadside chapel-shrine west of the settlement is dedicated to the Sacred Heart of Jesus and was built in the early 20th century.
