= Avgust Demšar =

Slovenian writer (born 1962)

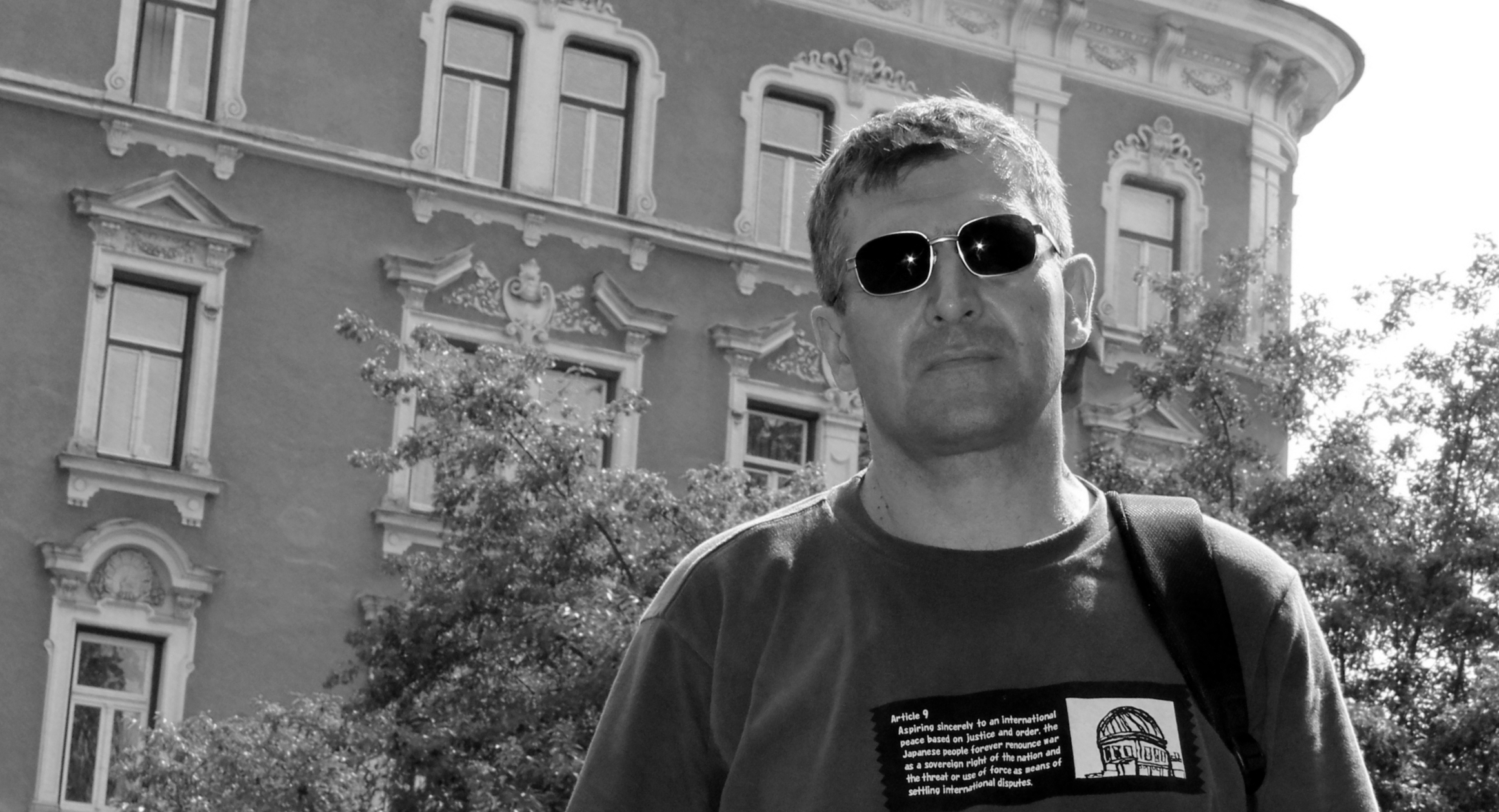
Avgust Demsar

Tomaž Zupančič (born 1962 in Maribor), better known under his pen name Avgust Demšar, is a Slovenian writer who specialises in detective fiction.
