= Avgusta =

Avgusta (Russian: А́вгуста or Авгу́ста) is a Russian Christian first name, the female form of the male first name Avgust. It is derived from the Latin word Augusta, meaning sacred, and was used as an honorific in ancient Rome. Its colloquial forms and diminutives include Ava (А́ва), Gusta (Гу́ста), Gustya (Гу́стя), Ustya (У́стя), Gusya (Гу́ся), Gutya (Гу́тя), and Aga (А́га).

"Avgusta" is also a colloquial form of the female first name Avgustina and a diminutive of the male first name Avgustin.
