= Avgustin =

Russian masculine given name

Avgustin (Russian: Августи́н) is a Russian male first name. Its feminine version is Avgustina. The name is derived from the Latin word augustus, which means majestic, sacred. Its colloquial form is Avgust (А́вгуст) (which can also be a separate, albeit related, name).

The patronymics derived from this first name are "Августи́нович" (Avgustinovich; masculine) and its colloquial form "Августи́ныч" (Avgustinych), and Августи́новна" (Avgustinovna; feminine).

Its diminutives include Avgustinka (Августи́нка), Avgusta (Авгу́ста), Gusta (Гу́ста),Gustya (Гу́стя), Ustya (У́стя), Gusya (Гу́ся), and Tina (Ти́на). Notable individuals with the surname include:

- Avguštin Stegenšek (1875–1920), Slovene theologian and historian
- Augustin Ujević, full name of Tin Ujević (1891–1955), Croatian poet

== See also ==
- Avguštine
- Augustin (name)
- Augustine (given name)
