= Avguštine =

- Location in Slovenia
- Coordinates: 45°50′15.14″N 15°26′25.36″E
- Country: Slovenia
- Traditional region: Lower Carniola
- Statistical region: Lower Sava
- Municipality: Kostanjevica na Krki

Area
  - Total: 0.43 km^{2} (0.17 sq mi)
- Elevation: 300.2 m (985 ft)

Population (2002)
  - Total: 26
- Postal code: 8311

Avguštine (pronounced [au̯ɡuˈʃtiːnɛ]; in older sources also Avgustine) is a settlement in the Municipality of Kostanjevica na Krki in eastern Slovenia. The area is part of the traditional region of Lower Carniola. It is now included in the Lower Sava Statistical Region.

There is a small chapel-shrine in the settlement. It was built in the early 20th century.
