= Avgustina =

Avgustina (Russian: Августи́на) is an uncommon Russian female first name. Its masculine versions are Avgustin and Avgust. The name is derived from the Latin word augustus, which means majestic, sacred, and was borrowed by Russians from Byzantine Christianity. Its colloquial forms are Avgusta (А́вгуста) (which can also be a separate, albeit related, name) and Gusta (Гу́ста).

The name was included into various, often handwritten, church calendars throughout the 17th–19th centuries, but was omitted from the official Synodal Menologium at the end of the 19th century. In 1924–1930, the name was included into various Soviet calendars, which included the new and often artificially created names promoting the new Soviet realities and encouraging the break with the tradition of using the names in the Synodal Menologia.

Its diminutives include Ava (А́ва), Avgustinka (Августи́нка), Avgusta (Авгу́ста), Gusta (Гу́ста), Gustya (Гу́стя), Ustya (У́стя), Gusya (Гу́ся), Gutya (Гу́тя), and Tina (Ти́на).

== See also ==
- Avguštine
