= Kostanjevica na Krki =

- Town
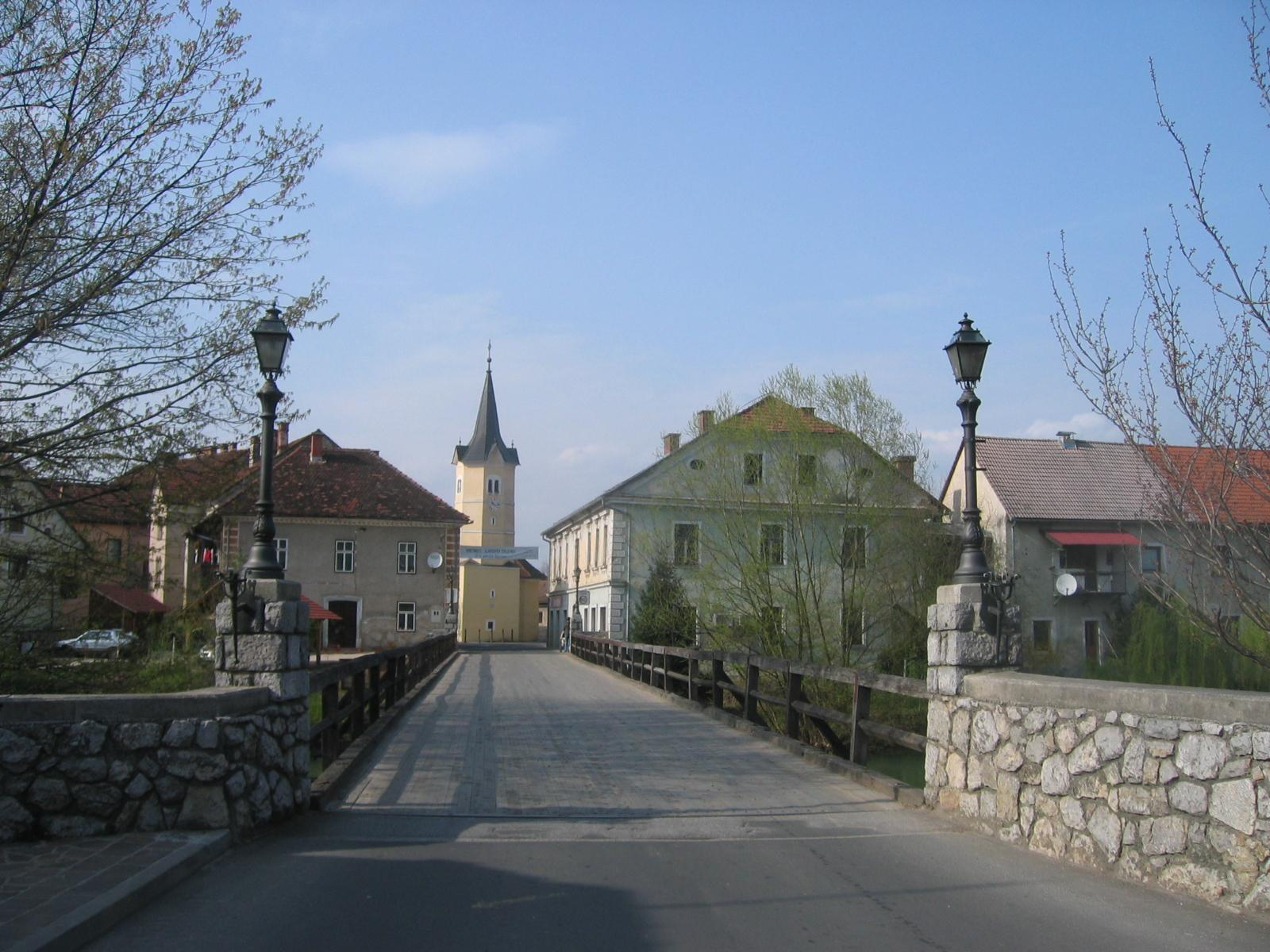
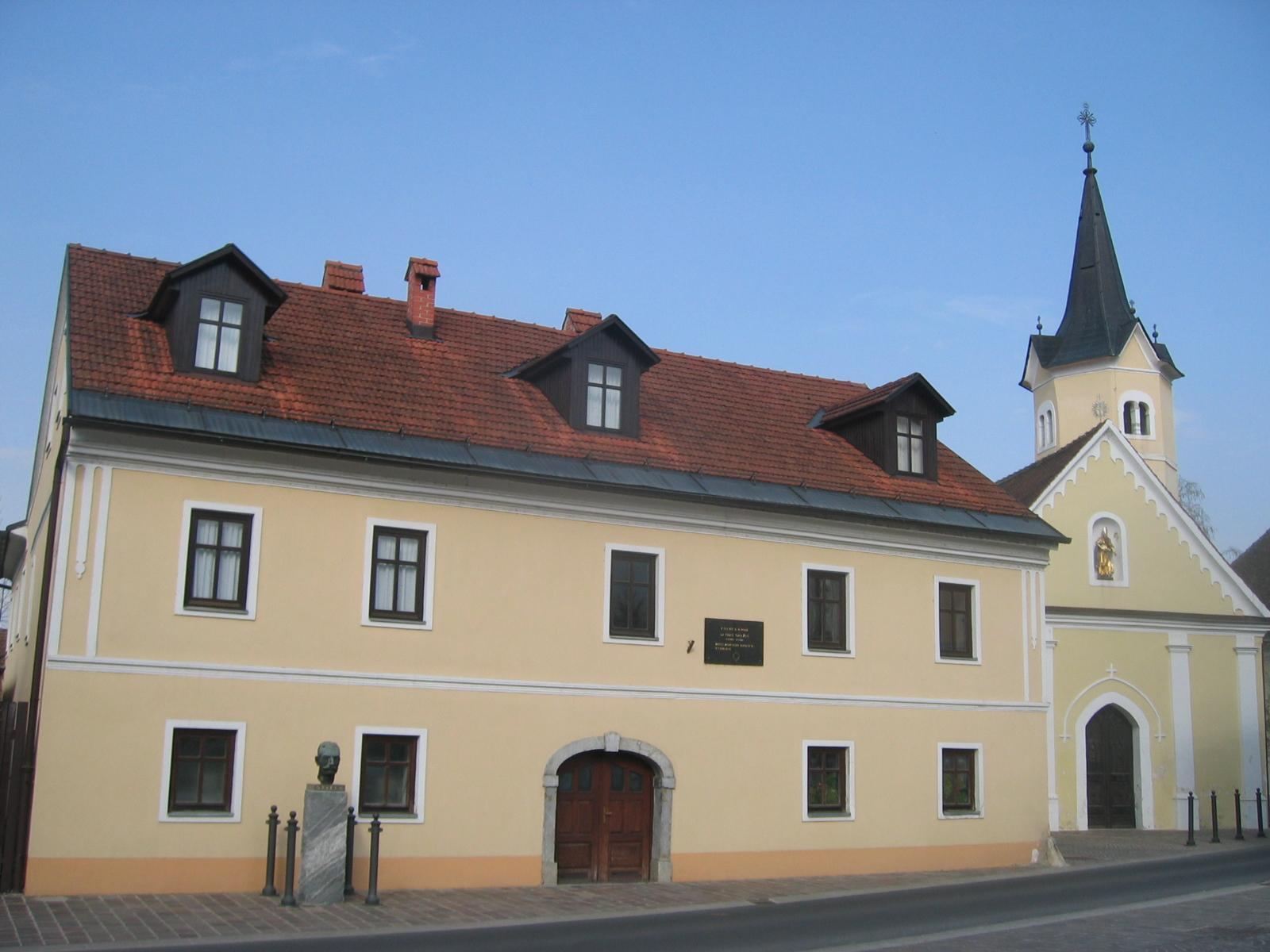
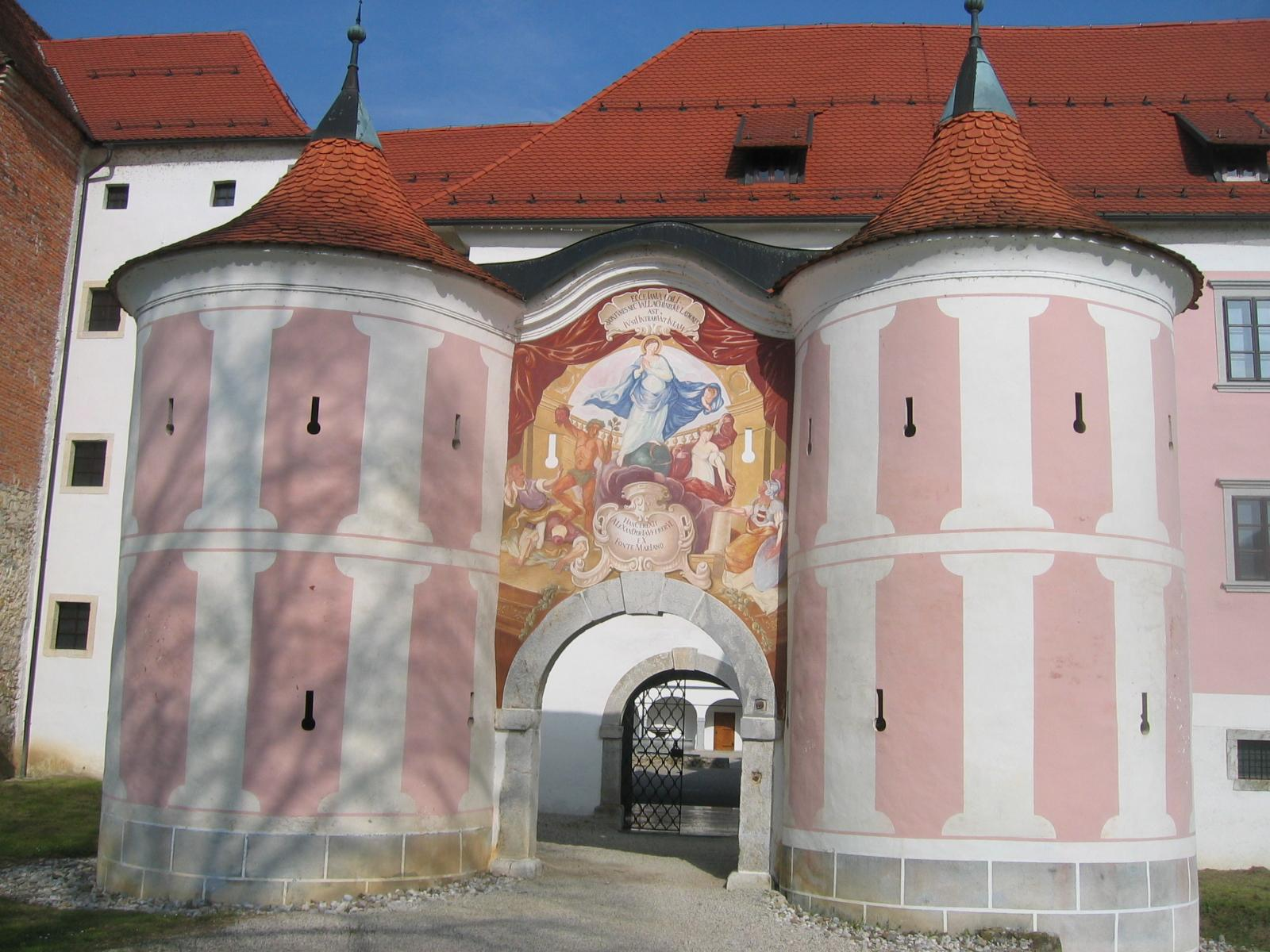
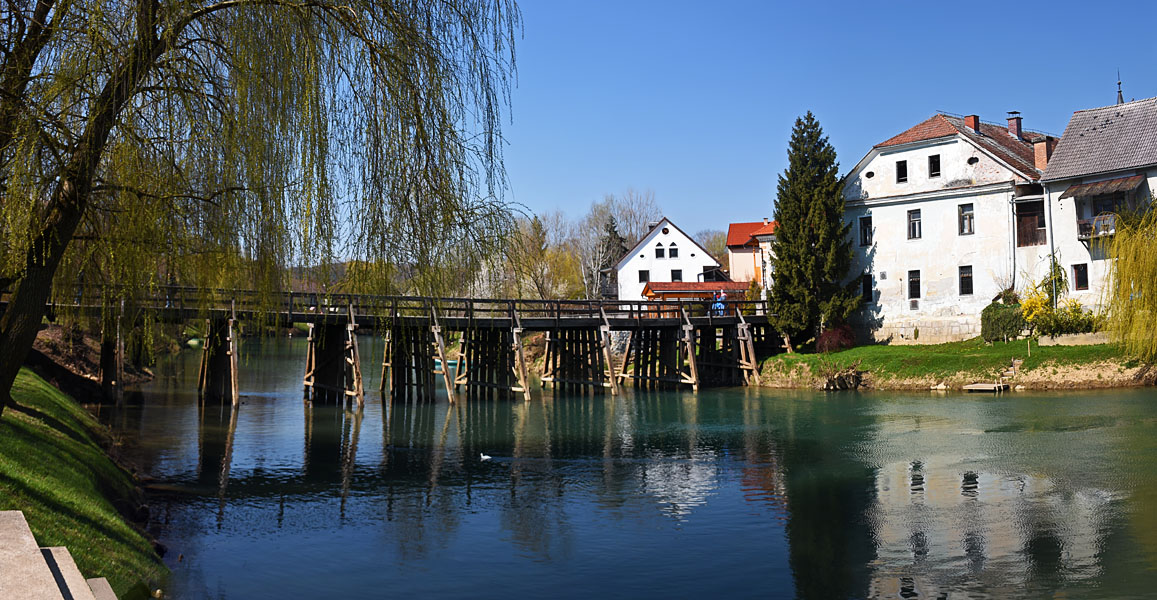
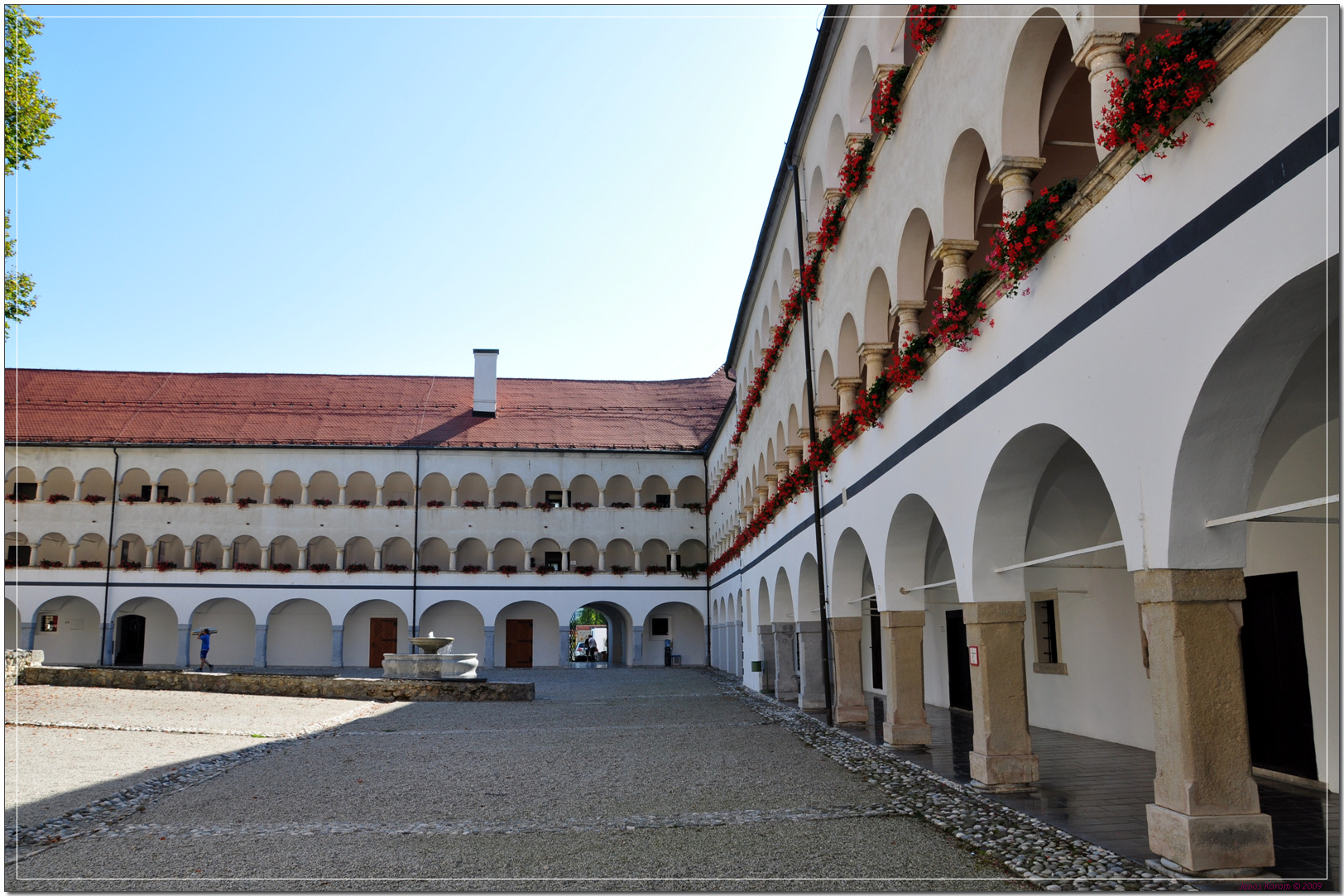
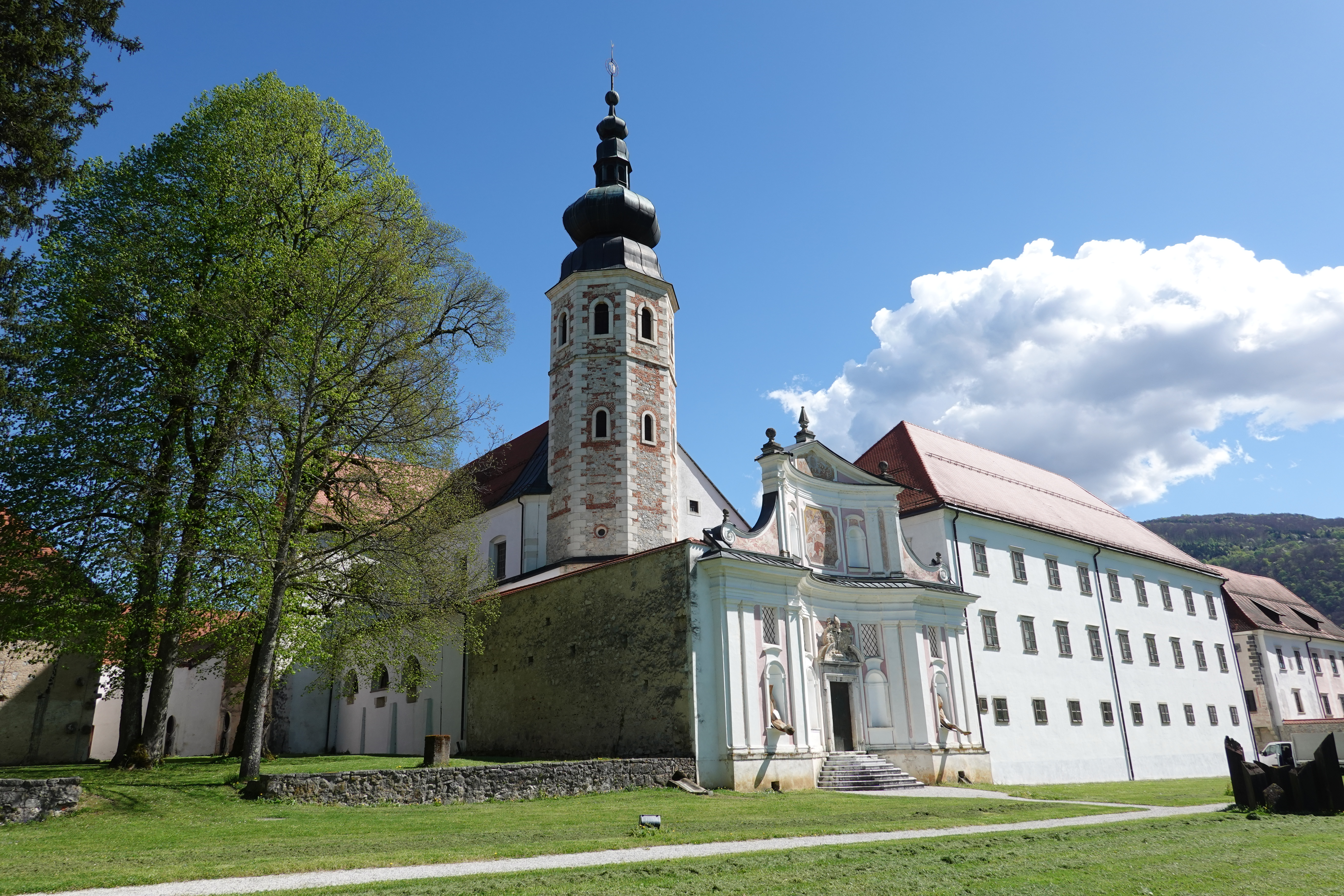
- From top, left to right: Kostanjevica across the bridge, Oražen House and St. Nicholas' Church, Monastery Gate, Bridge over Krka river, Monastery Courtyard, Kostanjevica Monastery

- Coat of arms

- Location in Slovenia
- Coordinates: 45°50′46.77″N 15°25′29.53″E
- Country: Slovenia
- Traditional region: Lower Carniola
- Statistical region: Lower Sava
- Municipality: Kostanjevica na Krki

Area
  - Total: 2.4 km^{2} (0.93 sq mi)
- Elevation: 150.4 m (493 ft)

Population (2012)
  - Total: 703
- Postal code: 8311 Kostanjevica na Krki

Kostanjevica na Krki (pronounced [kɔˈstàːnjɛʋitsa na ˈkə̀ɾki]; also Kostanjevica ob Krki, German: Landstraß) is a small town in the historic Lower Carniola region of southern Slovenia. It is the seat of the Municipality of Kostanjevica na Krki. Today it is part of the Lower Sava Statistical Region. It is located in the northern foothills of the Gorjanci Hills near the border with Croatia. The center of the settlement is on an island in the Krka River, and it is also promoted as the "Venice of Lower Carniola" in Slovenian (Slovene: Dolenjske Benetke).

== Name ==
The name of the settlement was changed from Kostanjevica to Kostanjevica na Krki in 1955. In the past the German name was Landstraß.

== History ==
The town is protected as a cultural and historical monument. Kostanjevica is the oldest town of the region. In the early 13th century, the Carinthian duke Bernhard von Spanheim established the Fons Sanctae Mariae Cistercian Abbey on the southern frontier of the March of Carniola, which he claimed against the resistance of the Patriarchs of Aquileia and the Dukes of Merania.

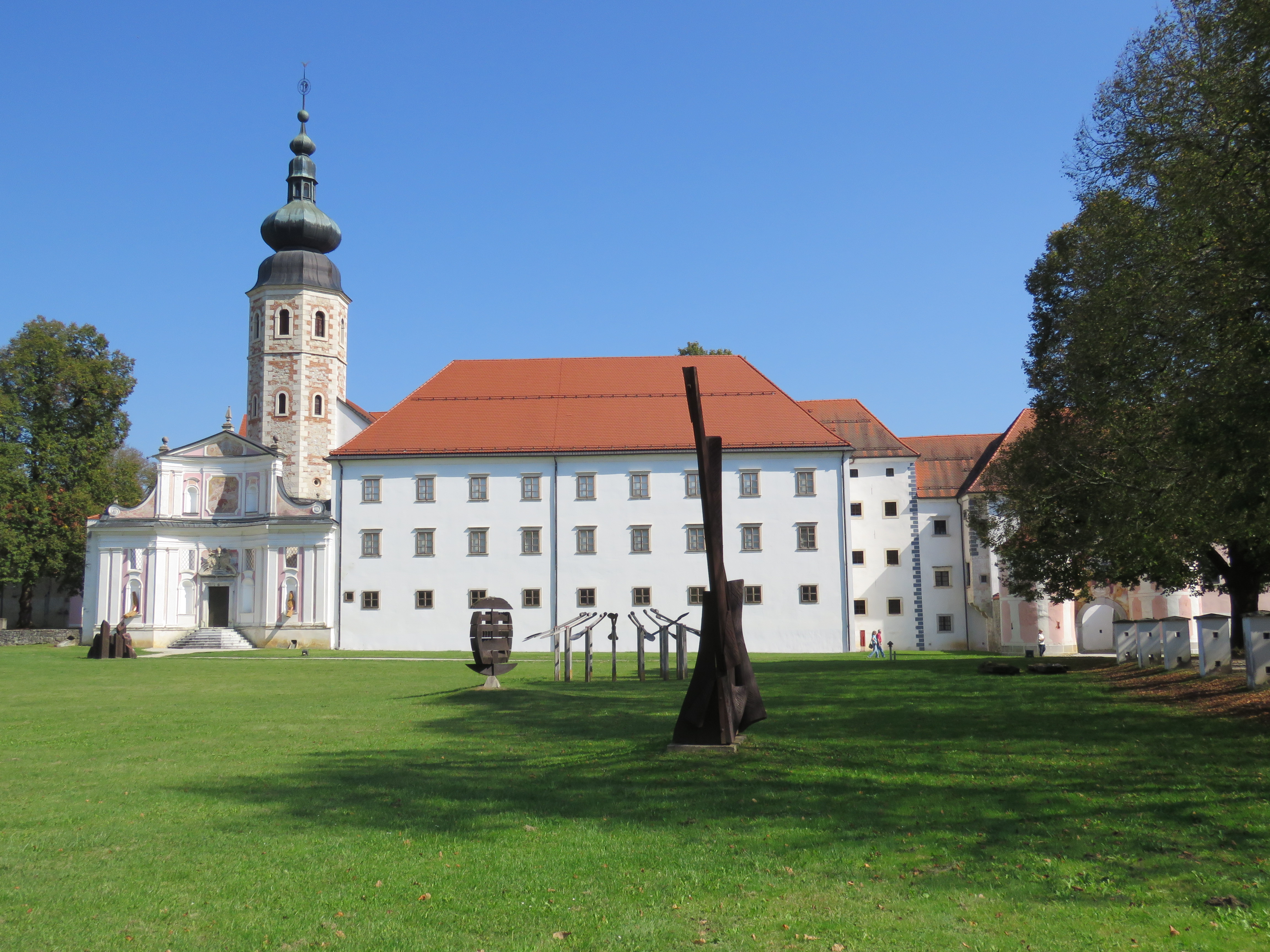
Kostanjevica Abbey

The monastery, a filial of Viktring Abbey near Klagenfurt, was enlarged in a Baroque style in the early 18th century. It was nevertheless finally disbanded in 1785 by the Habsburg emperor Joseph II.

The settlement of Kostanjevica was first mentioned as a town in 1210 and received market rights in 1249. During the Late Middle Ages it was an important commercial centre in the Duchy of Carniola held by the Habsburg archdukes of Austria. After several devastations by Ottoman military raids in the 15th and 16th centuries, it lost its importance. After the 17th century, it turned into a mostly rural settlement, which however retained its town status. In 2000, it was recognised by the National Assembly as a town.

Historical population
Year	Pop.	±%
1948	395	—
1953	503	+27.3%
1961	548	+8.9%
1971	559	+2.0%
1981	680	+21.6%
1991	751	+10.4%
2002	701	−6.7%
2011	695	−0.9%
2021	702	+1.0%
Population size may be affected by changes in administrative divisions.

=== Mass grave ===
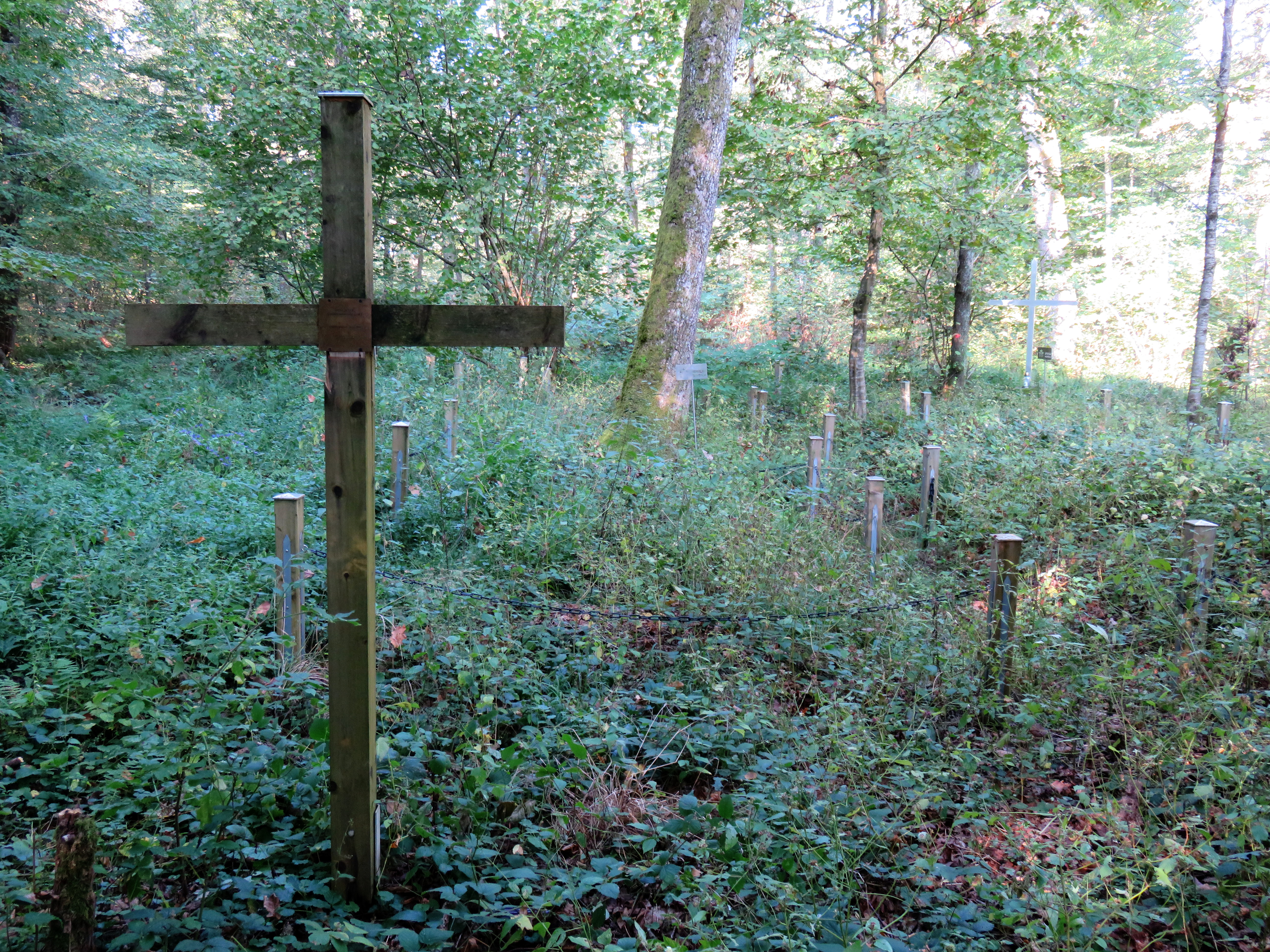
Krakovo Forest 2 Mass Grave

Kostanjevica na Krki is the location of one of two known mass graves associated with the Second World War in the Krakovo Forest. The sites consist of 10 large mounds and contain the remains of an undetermined number of Croatian prisoners of war, civilians, and possibly German soldiers as well. The Krakovo Forest 2 Mass Grave (Grobišče Krakovski gozd 2) lies about 800 meters (2,600 ft) northeast of the north bridge across the Krka River in Kostanjevica na Krki and about 200 meters (660 ft) from the bridge across Sajevec Creek. The site is marked by a large mound with a cross next to it. The grave site was created simultaneously with the Krakovo Forest 1 Mass Grave (Slovene: Grobišče Krakovski gozd 1) in neighboring Sajevce. The two sites were created around May 15, 1945, when Partisan forces captured about 4,000 Croatian soldiers and civilians at Dobruška Vas fleeing toward Austria. They were held on the left bank of the Krka River and killed in the forest over the course of a few days; eyewitnesses stated that the victims included children, women, and elderly persons.

== Sights ==
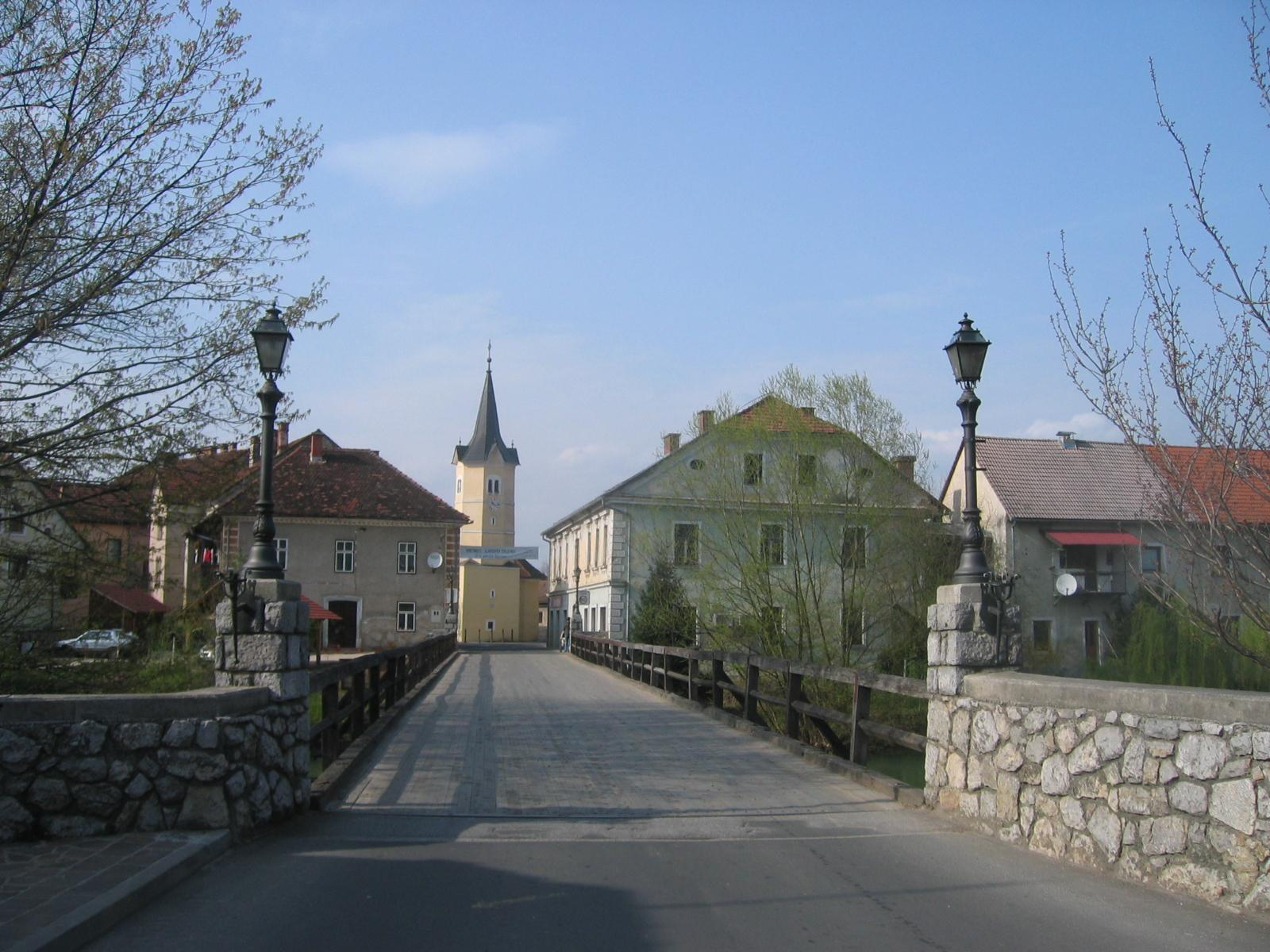
Bridge over the Krka River

A former monastic complex, which was burned by the Partisans in World War II, has been renovated and now houses the Božidar Jakac Gallery, an art gallery with a sculpture park and a permanent exhibition of works by Božidar Jakac. It is dominated by the Early Gothic abbey church built in 1234.

The town's parish church is dedicated to Saint James and belongs to the Roman Catholic Diocese of Novo Mesto. It is an originally 13th century Romanesque building that was largely rebuilt in the Baroque style in the 17th century. Kostanjevica Cave (Slovene: Kostanjeviška jama), a popular tourist destination, is nearby.

== Notable people ==
Notable people that were born or lived in Kostanjevica na Krki include:

- Ivan Belle (1867–1924), viticultural and orchard specialist
- Božo Borstnik (?–1974), journalist and translator
- Franc Bučar (1926–2000), veterinarian and technical writer
- Franc Fabinc (1881–1923), educational writer, journalist, and editor
- Jože Gorjup (1907–1932), painter, sculptor, and graphic artist
- Jože Jankovič (1901–1973), cultural activist
- Mirko Kuhelj (1904–1958), writer
- Jože Likar (1895–1986), writer and enologist
- France Lokar (1917–1994), poet
- Anton Makovic (1750–1803), surgeon, member of the national awakening movement and founder of formal education for midwives
- Franc Marešič (1750–1801), translator and religious writer
- Ivan Oražen (1869–1921), physician
- Lenart Pachenecker (?–1581), Cistercian monk and author of the first Catholic Slovenian book
- Josef Ressel (1793–1857), Bohemian-Austrian inventor of the screw propeller
- Franc Rueh (1887–1968), technical writer and electrical engineer
- Niko Sever (1889–?), education specialist
- Ilka Vašte (1891–1967), writer
- Avgust Žabkar (1854–1930), metalworking industrialist
- Radoslav Žargi (1918–1993), physician and specialist in infectious diseases

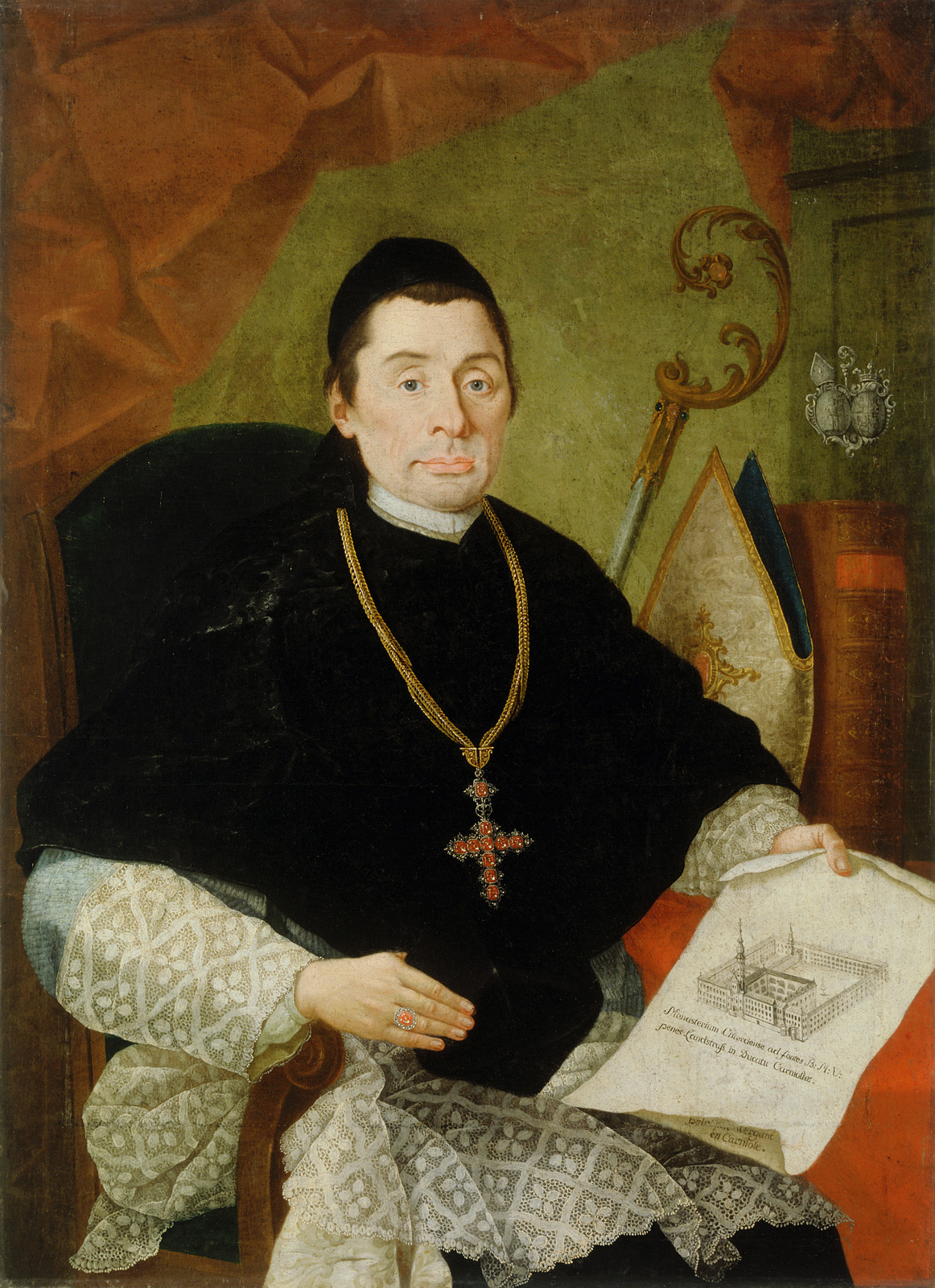
Fortunat Bergant - Leopold Busset
