= Battle of Isonzo =

Battle of Isonzo may refer to:

- Battle of Isonzo (489)
- Battle of Isonzo (1477)
- Battles of the Isonzo, a series of offensives in World War I
  - First Battle of the Isonzo
  - Second Battle of the Isonzo
  - Third Battle of the Isonzo
  - Fourth Battle of the Isonzo
  - Fifth Battle of the Isonzo
  - Sixth Battle of the Isonzo
  - Seventh Battle of the Isonzo
  - Eighth Battle of the Isonzo
  - Ninth Battle of the Isonzo
  - Tenth Battle of the Isonzo
  - Eleventh Battle of the Isonzo
  - Twelfth Battle of the Isonzo
