= Seventh Battle of the Isonzo =

1916 battle in Gorizia, Italy

Coordinates: 45.9330°N 13.6160°E

- Part of the Italian Front (First World War)
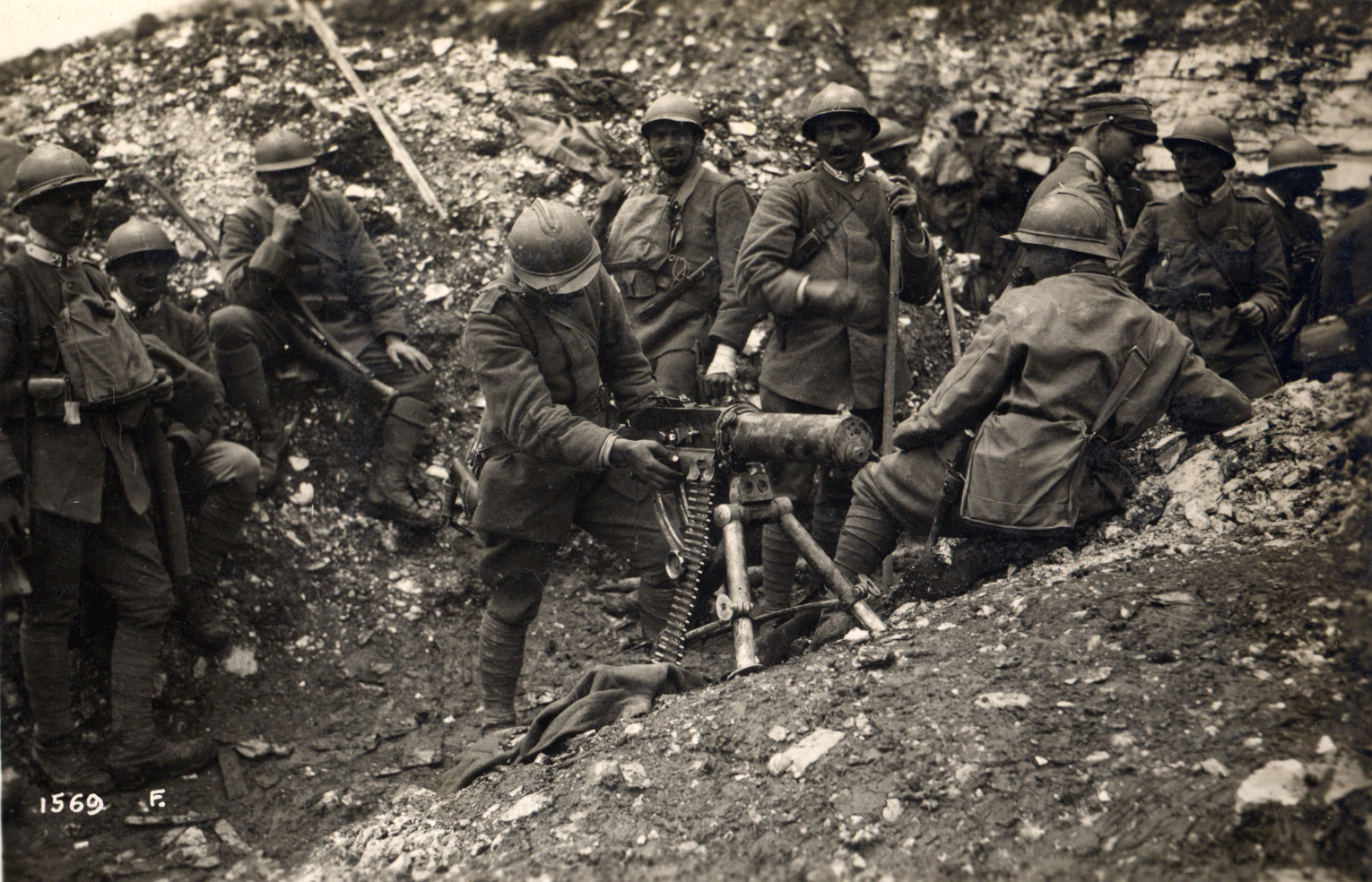
- Italian troops with a captured Austrian machine gun
Date	14–17 September 1916
Location	Gorizia, Italy
Result	Italian tactical victory
Territorial changes	Soča River Valley, Slovenia

Belligerents
Italy	Austria-Hungary

Commanders and leaders
(Kingdom of Italy) Luigi Cadorna; (Kingdom of Italy) Prince Emanuele Filiberto	(Austria-Hungary) Conrad von Hötzendorf; (Austria-Hungary) Svetozar Boroević

Strength
240 battalions; 1,150 artillery pieces	150 battalions; 770 artillery pieces

Casualties and losses
17,000–21,000	20,000

The Seventh Battle of the Isonzo was fought from 14 to 17 September 1916 between the armies of the Kingdom of Italy and those of Austria-Hungary. It followed the Italian successes during the Trentino Offensive and the Sixth Battle of the Isonzo in the spring of 1916.

== Battle ==
A short, sharp encounter fought from 14 to 17 September 1916, the Seventh Battle of the Isonzo saw Italian Chief of Staff Luigi Cadorna shift his focus from broad-based diversionary attacks to tightly focused initiatives directed at single targets. This latest Isonzo battle saw the Italian Third Army, with a large amount of artillery, attack on the Carso toward Nova Vas. Following a successful first day, Nova Vas was assaulted on the second day with substantial artillery bombardments on German bunkers. Within minutes of the Italians ceasing fire, the Austro-Hungarian forces surrendered.

Nevertheless, Cadorna's continued offensives along the Soča (Isonzo) did succeed in wearing away at Austro-Hungarian resources, both in terms of manpower and in crucial artillery availability. As each battle proceeded the Italians' war of attrition seemed ever more likely to wear the Austro-Hungarians into defeat, short of assistance from their German allies.

The Eighth Battle of the Isonzo followed on 10 October 1916.

== See also ==
- Battles of the Isonzo – overview
  - Sixth Battle of the Isonzo – 6–17 August 1916, also known as the Battle of Gorizia
  - Eighth Battle of the Isonzo – 10–12 October 1916
