= Third Battle of the Isonzo =

Battle in 1915 on the Italian Front during the First World War

Coordinates: 45°51′24″N 13°24′01″E

- Part of the Italian Front (First World War)
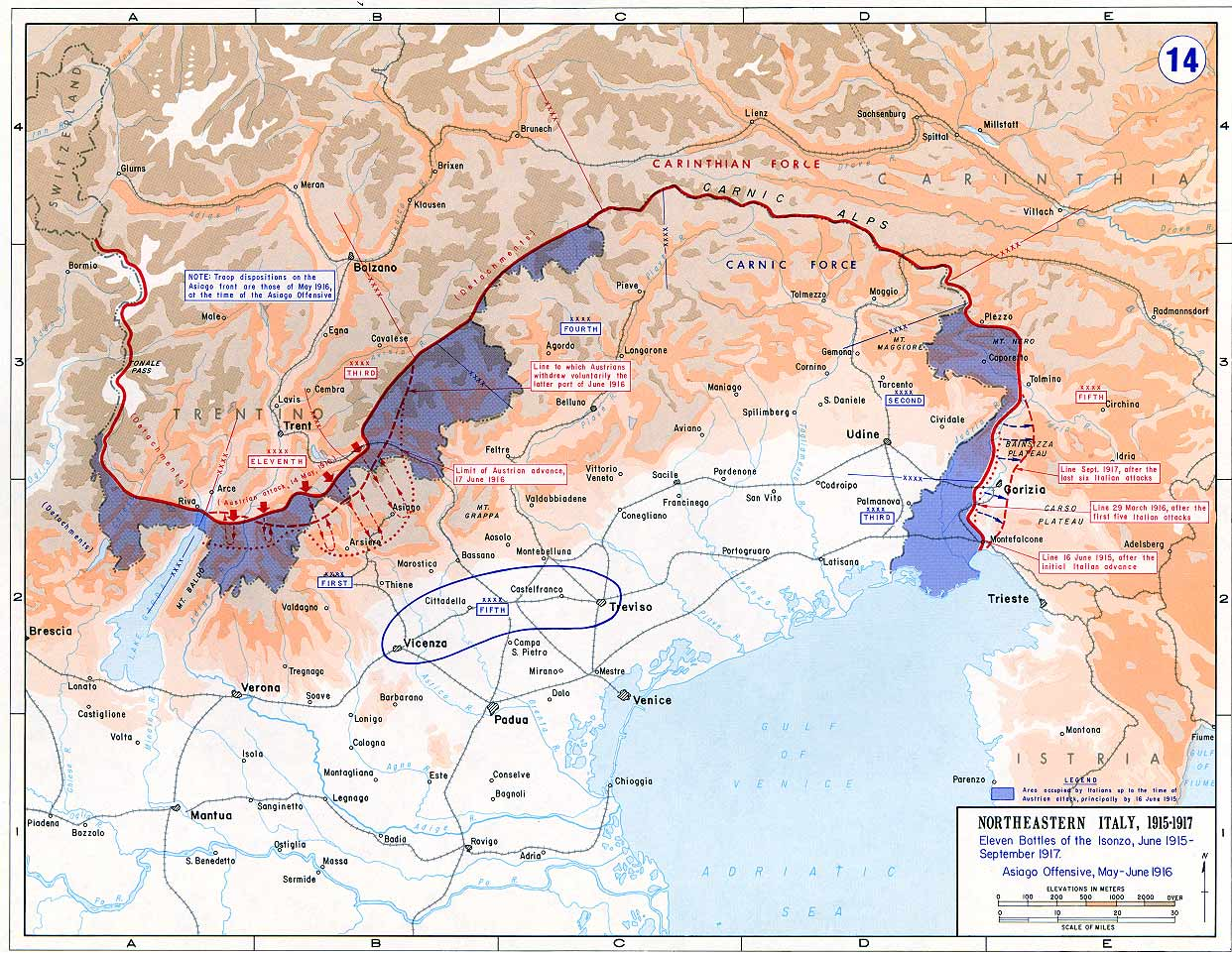
- Eleven Battles of the Isonzo; June 1915 – September 1917
Date	18 October – 4 November 1915
Location	Soča river, western Slovenia
Result	Austro-Hungarian victory

Belligerents
Italy	Austria-Hungary

Commanders and leaders
(Kingdom of Italy) Luigi Cadorna; (Kingdom of Italy) Pietro Frugoni; (Kingdom of Italy) Prince Emanuele Filiberto	(Austria-Hungary) Conrad von Hötzendorf; (Austria-Hungary) Archduke Eugen; (Austria-Hungary) Svetozar Boroević

Strength
338 battalions; 130 cavalry squadrons; 1,250 artillery pieces	137 + 47 battalions; 604 guns

Casualties and losses
67,008–80,000: 10,733–20,000 killed; 44,290–60,000 wounded; 11,985 missing or captured	41,847: 8,228 killed; 26,418 wounded; 7,201 missing or captured

The Third Battle of the Isonzo was fought from 18 October to 4 November 1915 between the armies of Italy and Austria-Hungary.

== Background ==
The first move was made in Italy, on the eastern sector; because this was their third attack that year, it was named as the Third Battle of the Isonzo (as the previous two were named the First and Second Battles of the Isonzo).

After roughly two and a half months of reprieve to recuperate from the casualties incurred from frontal assaults from the First Battle of the Isonzo and the Second Battle of the Isonzo, Luigi Cadorna, Italian commander-in-chief, understood that artillery played a fundamental role on the front and brought the total number to 1,250 pieces. As well as improving artillery, the Italian Army was also issued Adrian helmets, which proved useful in some situations but overall ineffective.

The main objectives were to take the Austro-Hungarian bridgeheads at Bovec (Plezzo), Tolmin, and (if possible) the town of Gorizia. Cadorna's tactic, of deploying his forces evenly along the entire Soča (Isonzo), proved indecisive, and the Austro-Hungarians took advantage of this by concentrating their firepower in certain areas. Specifically, the two objectives of the attack were Sabotin (Monte Sabotino) and Mount San Michele (Debela griža).

== Location ==
This took place on the Austro-Hungarian side of the border between Austria-Hungary and Italy. The battle is named after the Soča River that it was fought around, as well as the previous battles and the many that would eventually follow. Soča River flows through mountainous region and made large scale military operations hard. It also had frequently flooded banks. However, it was chosen because the Austro-Hungarian side had control of most of the other surrounding areas.

== Battle ==
Due to extensive artillery barrages, the Italians were able to advance to Plave (Plava) near Kanal ob Soči, beneath the southern end of the Banjšice Plateau (Bainsizza), and on Mount San Michele on the Karst Plateau in an attempt to outflank forces defending Gorizia. The plateau near San Michele was the scene of heavy attacks and counterattacks involving the Italian Third Army and Austro-Hungarian reinforcements from the Eastern and Balkan fronts under the command of Svetozar Boroević; both sides suffered heavy casualties. Thanks to the low profile held by Boroević's forces, the Austro-Hungarians were able to hold their positions despite heavy casualties, which were dwarfed by those of the Italian Army. The lull in action lasted barely two weeks at which time the Italian offensive started anew. The Italians made some progress before they were eventually forced back by the Austro-Hungarians. Although the second Italian army had possession of Sabotin for a brief period of time, they were countered by the Austro-Hungarians. The Third Army was able to approach Mt. San Michele, but were met with machine gun fire when attempting to sneak around the flank.

== Criticism of Luigi Cadorna ==
Cadorna was a well-known man throughout Italy for his achievements and background; however his wartime leadership is a debated topic in public discourse and historiography. His detractors blame him for heavy casualties and a rigid discipline leading to the harsh treatment of Italian troops (with the alleged introduction of decimation), but others have ascribed merits to Cadorna and argued that high casualties were a consequence of the tactical-strategic realities of the war. His harsh leadership skills led to many desertions. It was not until this Third Battle that he actually considered the sizes of troops and the amount of gunpower they possessed. Due to to terrain features and concentrations of attacks in a very small area, Italian superiority of manpower did not guarantee a breakthrough on the battlefield against the Austro-Hungarian defenders. This led Cadorna to adopt an attrition warfare as his main strategy, leading to further offensive on the Isonzo.

== Aftermath ==
Cadorna decided to attack again a week later, starting the Fourth Battle of the Isonzo and gaining some ground. However, it was not until the Sixth Battle of the Isonzo that the Italians would gain Gorizia.

== See also ==
- Battles of the Isonzo – overview
  - Second Battle of the Isonzo – 18 July – 3 August 1915
  - Fourth Battle of the Isonzo – 10 November – 2 December 1915
