= Battle of Asiago =

Battle on the Italian Front during World War I

Coordinates: 45°54′7″N 11°30′32″E

- Part of the Italian Front (First World War)
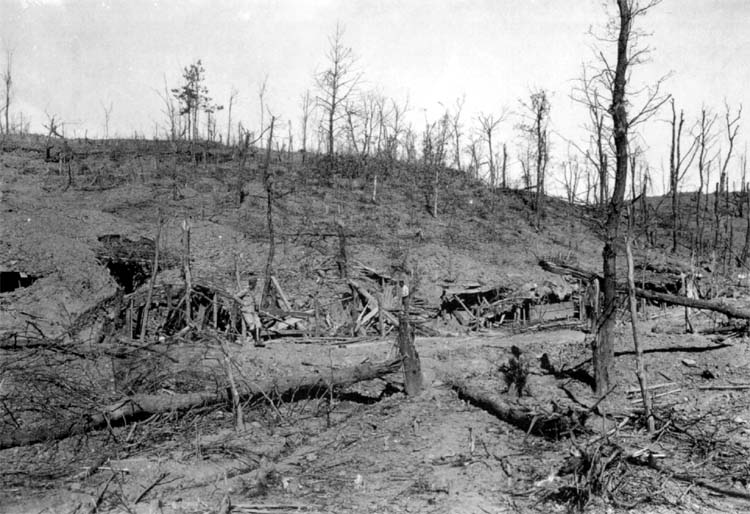
- The remaining alpine vegetation after the attack on Asiago.
| Date | 15 May – 27 July 1916 |
| Location | Asiago plateau, Veneto, Italy |
| Result | Inconclusive |

Belligerents
| Italy | Austria-Hungary |

Commanders and leaders
| (Kingdom of Italy) Luigi Cadorna (Kingdom of Italy) Roberto Brusati (Kingdom of Italy) Guglielmo Pecori Giraldi (Kingdom of Italy) Pietro Frugoni | (Austria-Hungary) Conrad von Hötzendorf (Austria-Hungary) Archduke Eugen of Austria (Austria-Hungary) Viktor Dankl von Krasnik (Austria-Hungary) Hermann Kövess |

Units involved
| (Kingdom of Italy) 1st Army (Kingdom of Italy) 5th Army | (Austria-Hungary) 11th Army (Austria-Hungary) 3rd Army |

Strength
| 172 battalions 850 guns | 300 battalions 2,000 guns |

Casualties and losses
| 15,453 killed 76,642 wounded 55,635 missing or captured | 10,203 killed 45,651 wounded 26,961 missing or captured |

The Battle of Asiago, also known as Südtirol Offensive or Battle of the Plateaux (in Italian: Battaglia degli Altipiani), wrongly nicknamed Strafexpedition (German for "punitive expedition"; this name has no reference in official Austrian documentation of the time and it is considered to be of popular origin), began with a major offensive launched on 15 May 1916 by the Austro-Hungarians on the territory of Vicentine Alps in the Italian Front of World War I. It was an "unexpected" attack that took place in the Asiago plateau (province of Vicenza, in northeast Italy, then at the border between the Kingdom of Italy and Austria-Hungary) after the Fifth Battle of the Isonzo (March 1916). The Austro-Hungarian offensive, initially successful, was followed by an Italian counter-offensive reconquering much of the lost ground and Asiago.

Commemorating this battle and the soldiers killed in World War I is the Asiago War Memorial (province of Vicenza, Veneto, northeast Italy).

== Background ==
For some time the Austro-Hungarian commander-in-chief, General Conrad von Hötzendorf, had been proposing the idea of an offensive on the Italian western front that would lethally cripple Italy, Austria-Hungary's ex-ally, claimed to be guilty of betraying the Triple Alliance, and in previous years he had had the frontier studied in order to formulate studies with regard to a possible invasion.

The problem had appeared to be serious, mostly because the frontier ran through high mountains and the limited Italian advances of 1915 had worsened the situation and excluded a great advance beyond the valleys of Valsugana and Val Lagarina (both connected by railway) and the plateaus of Lavarone, Folgaria and Asiago.

The geographic location of the routes of advance was conducive to the original plan which called for an advance from Trent to Venice, isolating the Italian 2nd and 3rd Armies who were fighting on the Isonzo and the Italian 4th Army who was defending the Belluno region and the eastern Trentino.

The preparations for the battle began in December 1915, when Conrad von Hötzendorf proposed to his German counterpart, General Erich von Falkenhayn, shifting divisions from the Eastern Front in Galicia to the Tyrol, substituting them with German divisions. His request was denied because Germany was not yet at war with Italy (which would declare war on Germany eight months later), and because redeploying German units on the Italian Front would have diminished German offensive capability against Russia, as well as against France in the anticipated offensive in Verdun. After having received a negative reply from the Germans, who refused the proposed replacement and actively tried to discourage the Austro-Hungarian proposed attack, Conrad von Hötzendorf decided to operate autonomously. The 11th Austro-Hungarian Army, under the command of Count Viktor Dankl, would carry out the offensive followed by the 3rd Army under Hermann Kövess. It was not so easy, however, because the Italians had deployed in the area about 250,000 well-entrenched troops (General Brusati's First Army and part of the Fourth Army). Italian intelligence had been gathering information about an impending enemy offensive in Trentino — and a big one — for about a month, but Cadorna dismissed those reports, persuaded as he was that nothing could happen in that region.

== Battle ==
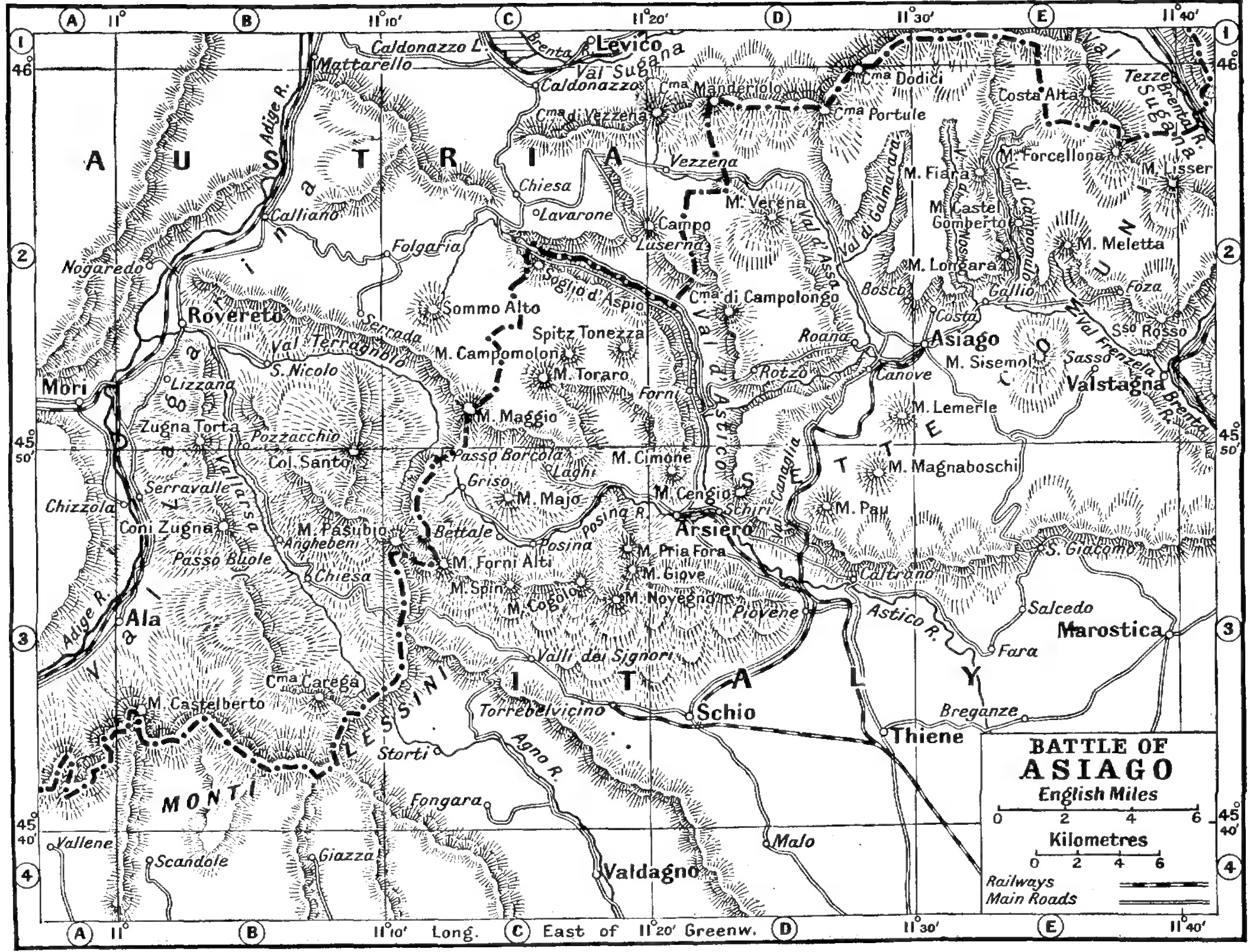
Map of the Battle of Asiago.

On 15 May 1916, 2,000 Austro-Hungarian artillery guns opened a heavy barrage against the Italian lines, setting Trentino afire. The Austro-Hungarian infantry attacked along a 50 kilometres (31 mi) front. The Italian wings stood their ground, but the centre yielded, and the Austro-Hungarians broke through, threatening to reach the beginning of the Venetian plain. The offensive overwhelmed the undermanned and disorganized First Army, and with Vicenza about 30 kilometres (19 mi) away, all the Italian forces on the Isonzo would face outflanking.

Cadorna hastily sent reinforcements to the First Army, and deployed the newly formed Fifth Army under Pietro Frugoni to engage the enemy in case they succeeded in entering the plain. The situation was critical, but the commitment of reserves and the replacement of several Italian commanders who were judged unfit gradually improved the situation.

On 20 May, Austro-Hungarian troops advanced onto the Asiago plateau, and by 28 May Asiago had fallen. The Austrians, however, were exhausted, low on munitions, and had weak supply lines, and by the end of May had failed to break out into the lowlands.

The new Italian defensive line on Mounts Pasubio, Novegno, Zugna, Buole Pass and Astico Valley held and repelled repeated Austro-Hungarian attacks; on 2 June, Italian troops started their counteroffensive, slowly regaining ground.

Furthermore, on 4 June, the Russians unexpectedly took the initiative in Galicia, where they managed to enter Austrian soil. Although they were effectively countered by German and Austro-Hungarian troops, Hötzendorf was forced quickly to withdraw half of his divisions from Trentino. With that, the Strafexpedition could no longer be sustained and the Austro-Hungarians retired from many of their positions. Italian troops in the region were increased to 400,000 to counter the Austro-Hungarian positions.

Although the Strafexpedition had been checked, it had political consequences in Italy: the Salandra Cabinet fell, and Paolo Boselli became the new prime minister.

== Bibliography ==
- Enrico Acerbi, Strafexpedition, Gino Rossato Editore, 1992
- Gerhard Artl: Die "Strafexpedition": Österreich-Ungarns Südtiroloffensive 1916. Verlag A. Weger, Brixen 2015, ISBN 978-88-6563-127-0.
- Fritz Weber: Alpenkrieg. Artur Kollitsch Verlag, Klagenfurt 1939.
- Walter Schaumann: Dall'Ortles all'Adriatico Immagini del fronte italo-austriaco 1915–1918. Wien 1993.
- L'esercito italiano nella grande guerra LEINGG (1915–1918) Volume I – IV /Ministero della Guerra – Ufficio Storico, Roma 1929–1974.
- One Year on the High Plateau, Emilio Lussu
- McClure, William Kidston (1926). "Asiago, Battle of" . In Garvin, James Louis (ed.). Encyclopædia Britannica. Vol. 30 (13th ed.). London & New York: The Encyclopædia Britannica Company. pp. 239–241.
