= Ninth Battle of the Isonzo =

1916 battle during WWI

Coordinates: 45°54′35″N 13°38′17″E

- Part of the Italian Front (World War I)
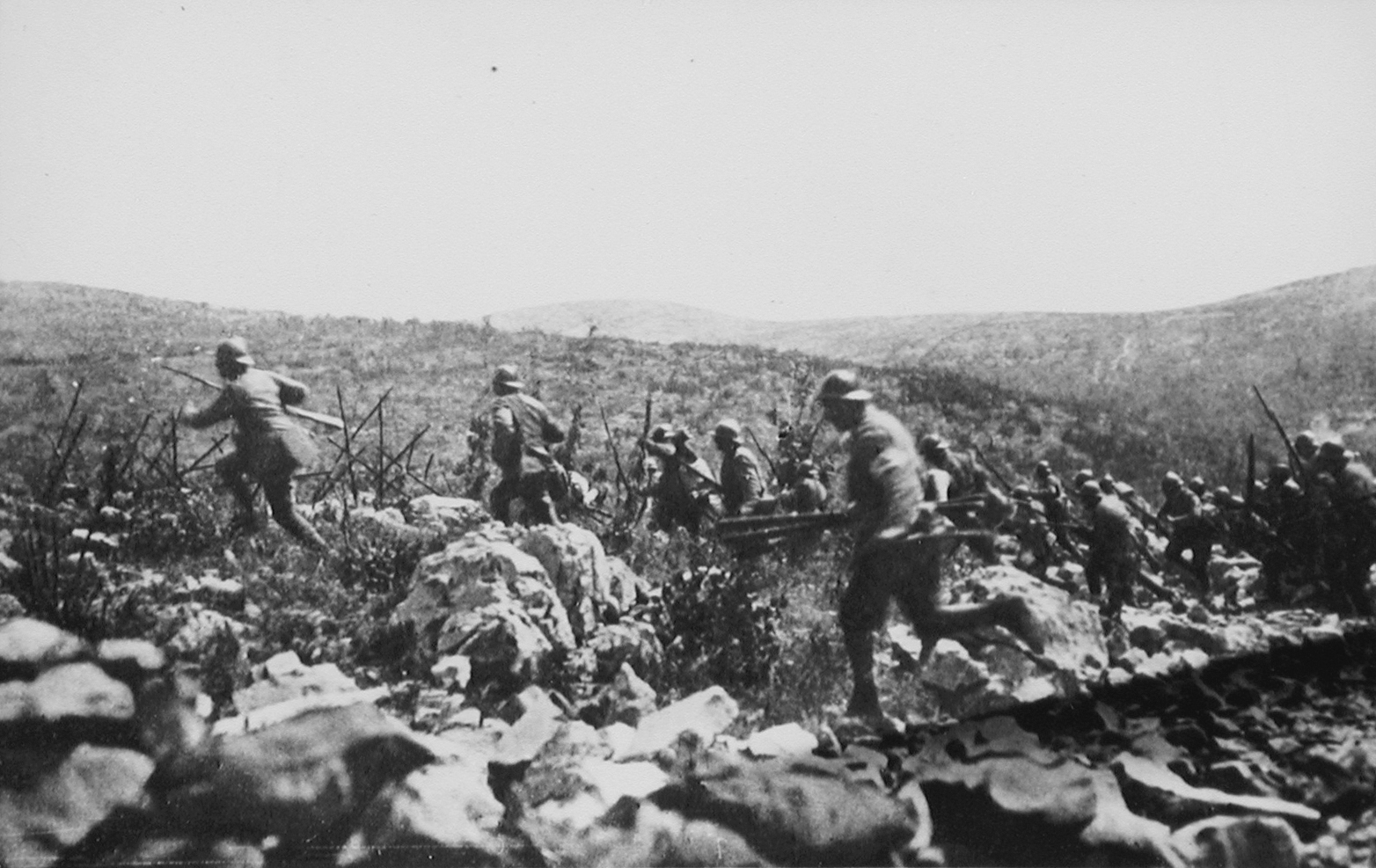
- Italian infantry after leaving the trenches on the eve of the battle
Date	31 October – 4 November 1916
Location	Soča valley, Slovenia
Result	Austro-Hungarian defensive victory

Belligerents
Italy	Austria-Hungary; Germany

Commanders and leaders
(Kingdom of Italy) Luigi Cadorna	(Austria-Hungary) Svetozar Boroević

Strength
225 battalions; 1,400 artillery pieces	150 battalions; 800 artillery pieces

Casualties and losses
4,785 killed; 19,922 wounded; 9,217 missing or captured	2,382 killed 12,028 wounded; 8,119 missing or captured

The Ninth Battle of the Isonzo was an Italian offensive against Austria-Hungary in the course World War I. Including a triumvirate of battles launched after the Italians' successful seizure of Gorizia in August 1916 to extend their bridgehead to the left of the town, it ended in further failure for the Italian Chief of Staff Luigi Cadorna.

The battle started with an attack on Vrtojba and the northern and central areas of the Karst Plateau. With the ninth battle fought from 1 to 4 November 1916 the combined casualty total from the three linked battles proved sufficiently heavy to ensure that each attack was of short duration (each less than a week). The Italians suffered 75,000 casualties and the Austro-Hungarians 63,000.

As always along the Soča (Isonzo), the Austro-Hungarian Army's command of the mountainous terrain provided a formidable natural barrier to the Italians' attempts to achieve a breakthrough. Cadorna had intended to ensure such a breakthrough in the wake of the capture of Gorizia during the Sixth Battle of the Isonzo, but instead the war of attrition gathered pace.

Neither side could particularly afford the casualties suffered but the Austro-Hungarians in particular were finding their defensive lines increasingly stretched. Realising this they continued to call upon their German ally to provide military assistance within the sector. When the Germans finally assented (sensing the potential collapse of the Austro-Hungarian position) and constructed a combined force in time for the Twelfth Battle of Isonzo, the results were dramatic.

However, with the ninth battle called off in failure on 4 November 1916 and the Italians undeniably weakened by continual offensive operations throughout the year – 1916 had seen five Isonzo operations on top of four undertaken the year before - a lengthy break was taken for the winter.

Operations renewed afresh with the Tenth Battle of the Isonzo on 12 May 1917.

== See also ==
- Battles of the Isonzo – overview
  - Eighth Battle of the Isonzo – 10–12 October 1916
  - Tenth Battle of the Isonzo – 12 May – 8 June 1917
