= Fourth Battle of the Isonzo =

Battle in 1915 on the Italian Front during the First World War

Coordinates: 45°58′9″N 13°36′40″E

- Part of the Italian Front (World War I)
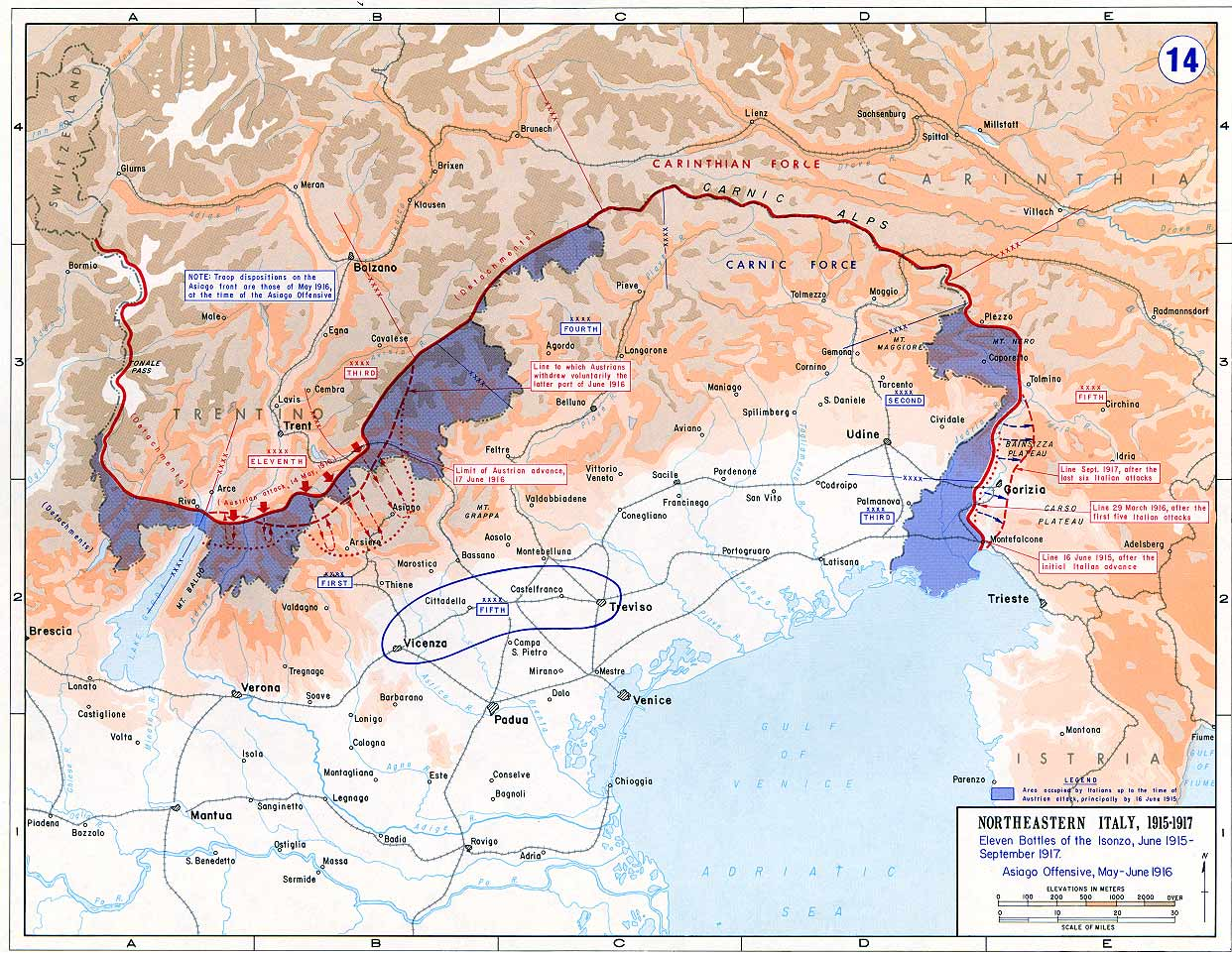
- Eleven Battles of the Isonzo; June 1915 – September 1917
Date	10 November – 2 December 1915
Location	Soča/Isonzo river, western Slovenia
Result	Italian victory: Italian offensive suspended; Conquest of important positions (Mount Calvario, Oslavia)

Belligerents
Italy	Austria-Hungary

Commanders and leaders
(Kingdom of Italy) Luigi Cadorna; (Kingdom of Italy) Pietro Frugoni; (Kingdom of Italy) Prince Emanuele Filiberto	(Austria-Hungary) Conrad von Hötzendorf; (Austria-Hungary) Archduke Eugen; (Austria-Hungary) Svetozar Boroević

Strength
370 battalions; 1,374 guns	155 battalions; 626 guns

Casualties and losses
49,500 (7,500 dead)	32,100 (4,000 dead)

The Fourth Battle of the Isonzo was fought between the armies of Kingdom of Italy and those of Austria-Hungary on the Italian Front in World War I, between 10 November and 2 December 1915.

== Overview ==
In contrast to the previous three battles of the Isonzo (in June, July and October), this offensive was brief, and is considered a continuation of the third battle of the Isonzo.

Most of the clash was concentrated in the direction of Gorizia and on the Karst Plateau, though the push was distributed on the whole Isonzo front. The Italian Second Army, aiming for the town of Gorizia, was able to capture the hilly area around Oslavia (Oslavje) and San Floriano del Collio (Števerjan) overlooking the Soča (Isonzo) and Gorizia itself. The Italian Third Army, covering the rest of the front up to the sea, launched a series of large attacks which brought no significant gain.

Mount Sei Busi was unsuccessfully attacked by Italians five times.

The intensity of the fighting increased until the end of November, when the bridgehead of Tolmin (Tolmino) was heavily shelled and casualties peaked. In the first fifteen days of December, however, the fighting was reduced to small scale skirmishes as opposed to the massive frontal assaults that characterized the previous phases of the battle.

An unsigned truce on the Karst Plateau was made as the temperatures dropped, and operations were ceased due to lack of supplies.

The Austro-Hungarian High Command, worried by huge losses, requested assistance from the German Empire, which was not yet formally in the war against Italy. German Empire intervened on the Italian Front in eleventh battle of the Isonzo.

== See also ==
- Battles of the Isonzo – overview
  - Third Battle of the Isonzo – 18 October – 3 November 1915
  - Fifth Battle of the Isonzo – 9−17 March 1916
- Scipio Slataper
