= Eighth Battle of the Isonzo =

1916 battle on the First World War's Italian Front

Coordinates: 45.9330°N 13.6160°E

- Part of the Italian Front (First World War)
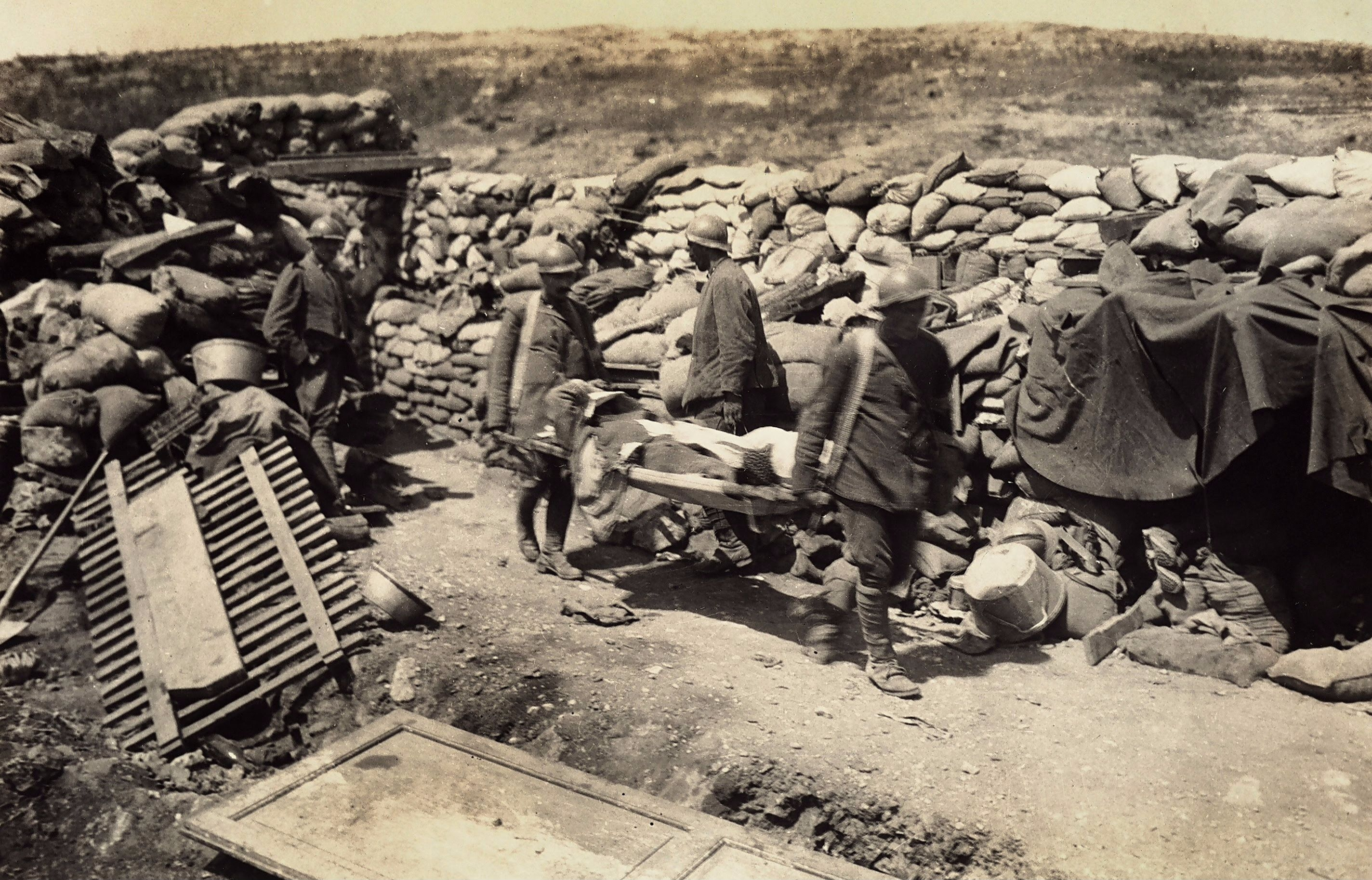
- Transfer of wounded Italian soldiers after the bombing of Monfalcone
Date	10–12 October 1916
Location	Soča valley, Slovenia
Result	Inconclusive

Belligerents
Italy	Austria-Hungary

Commanders and leaders
(Kingdom of Italy) Luigi Cadorna	(Austria-Hungary) Svetozar Boroević

Strength
20 divisions	14 divisions

Casualties and losses
23,802 killed, wounded, missing or captured	38,000 killed, wounded, missing or captured

The Eighth Battle of the Isonzo was fought between 10 and 12 October 1916 between Italy and Austria-Hungary.

== Battle ==
The Eighth Battle of the Isonzo, fought briefly from 10 to 12 October 1916, was essentially a continuation of attempts made during the Seventh Battle of the Isonzo (14–17 September 1916) to extend the bridgehead established at Gorizia during the Sixth Battle of the Isonzo in August 1916. Like the previous battle and the subsequent Ninth Battle of the Isonzo, it was fought on smaller sectors on the front and only for a few days (such attacks were called by the Italian command "spallate", Italian for "shoulder-barges").

Following the initial bombardment, the Italian brigades began to attack. By night, Italian forces on the Karst had surpassed Austrian positions in some areas before being forced to halt under enemy fire; sections of the Austrian first line had been captured by the Italians, though no further progress could be made. The battle resumed on October 11; the Italian and Austrian artilleries began a furious simultaneous bombardment while troops clashed on the battlefield. Italian troops seized additional stretches of enemy trenches. On the 12th, the Austrians attempted a series of counterattacks to reclaim lost ground, but they were repeatedly repelled with significant losses and the capture of hundreds of prisoners. This led to a cessation of the battle. From October 10 to 12, the Italians lost 23,802 soldiers and 782 officers, while the Austrians lost 39,800 soldiers and 813 officers. The front line had moved to within a few kilometers of Trieste. To shorten the front line and concentrate troops on the new positions, the Austrians retreated and abandoned the Gorizia valley. They withdrew to a new line on Mount Santo and supported by the Hermada hills. The seemingly interminable Isonzo onslaught was next renewed with the Ninth Battle of the Isonzo on 1 November 1916, the fifth and final attack of the year.

== See also ==
- Battles of the Isonzo – overview
  - Seventh Battle of the Isonzo – 14–17 September 1916
  - Ninth Battle of the Isonzo – 1–4 November 1916
