= Second Battle of the Isonzo =

Battle in 1915 on the Italian Front during the First World War

Coordinates: 45°51′48″N 13°31′41″E

- Part of the Italian Front (World War I)
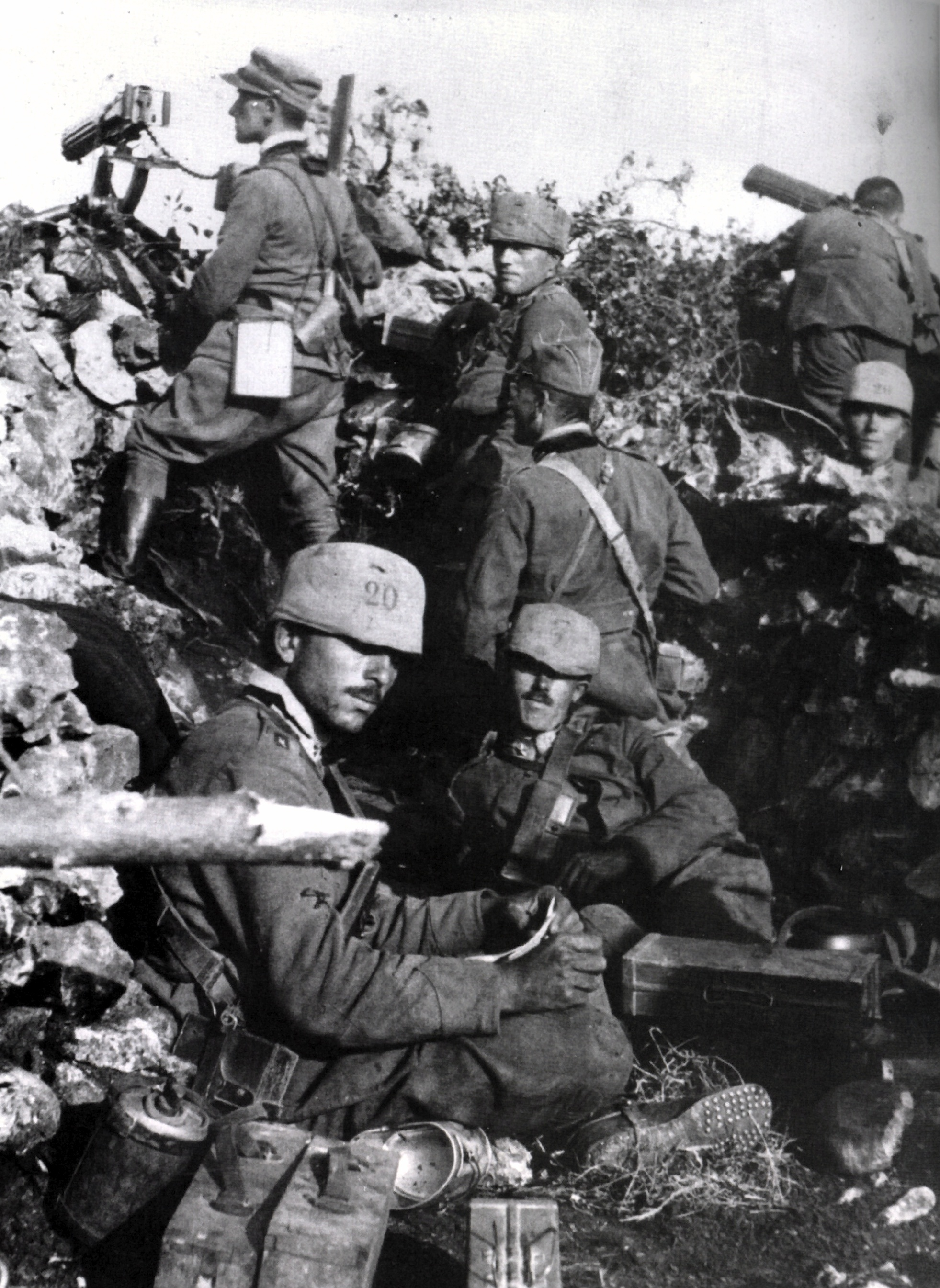
- Cavalry Regiment "Cavalleggeri di Roma" (20th) soldiers during the Second Battle of the Isonzo
| Date | 18 July – 3 August 1915 |
| Location | Soča river, northwest Slovenia |
| Result | Italian tactical victory |

Belligerents
| Italy | Austria-Hungary |

Commanders and leaders
| (Kingdom of Italy) Luigi Cadorna; (Kingdom of Italy) Pietro Frugoni; (Kingdom of Italy) Prince Emanuele Filiberto | (Austria-Hungary) Conrad von Hötzendorf; (Austria-Hungary) Archduke Eugen; (Austria-Hungary) Svetozar Boroević |

Strength
| 240 battalions | 105 battalions |

Casualties and losses
| 41,800 losses | 46,600 losses |

The Second Battle of the Isonzo was fought between the armies of the Kingdom of Italy and those of Austria-Hungary in the Italian Front in World War I, between 18 July and 3 August 1915.

== Overview ==
After the failure of the First Battle of the Isonzo, two weeks earlier, Luigi Cadorna, commander-in-chief of the Italian forces, decided for a new thrust against the Austro-Hungarian lines with heavier artillery support.

The overall plans of the Italian offensive were barely changed by the outcomes of the previous fight, besides the role of general Frugoni's Second Army, which this time had, on paper, to carry out only demonstrative attacks all over his front. The major role, assigned to the Duke of Aosta's Third Army, was to conquer Monte San Michele (Debela griža) and Mount Cosich (Košnik), cutting the enemy line and opening the way to Gorizia.

General Cadorna's tactics were to advance his troops in a frontal assault against the Austro-Hungarian line, overcome the enemy's barbed-wire fences, and take the trenches, after a heavy artillery bombardment. The insufficiency of war materiel – from rifles, to artillery shells, to shears to cut barbed wire – nullified the Italians' numerical superiority.

== The battle ==
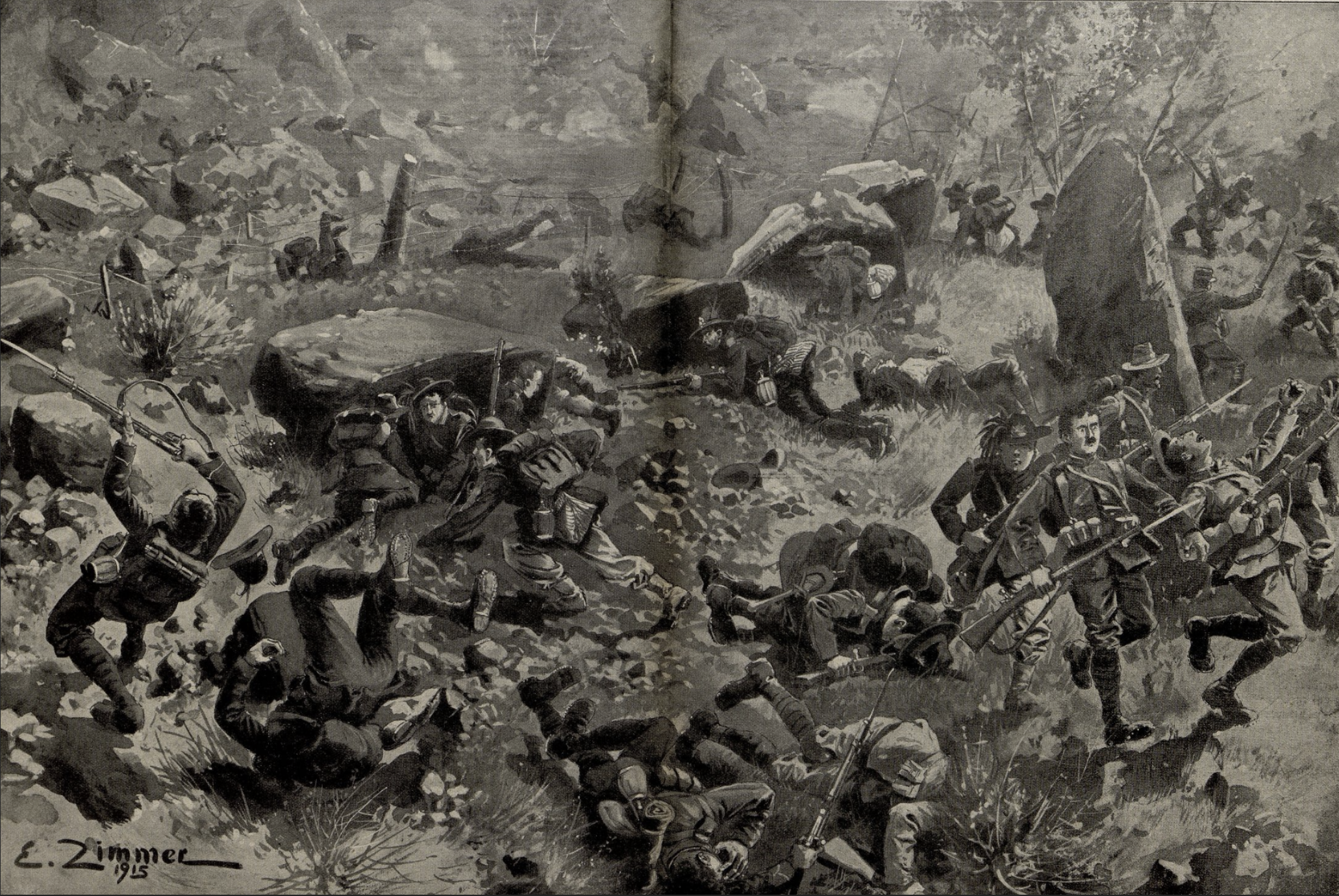
Repulsed Italian attack against the Austro-Hungarian positions on the Doberdo plateau (German illustration)

The Karst Plateau was the site of an exhausting series of hand-to-hand fights involving the Italian Second and Third Armies, with severe casualties on both sides. Bayonets, swords, knives, and various scrap metal and debris were all used in the melee fights. The Austro-Hungarian 20th Honvéd Infantry Division lost two-thirds of its effective strength and was routed due to a combination of the successive Italian Army attacks and the unfavorable terrain.

On 25 July the Italians occupied the Cappuccio Wood, a position west of Mount San Michele, which was not very steep but dominated quite a large area including the Austro-Hungarian bridgehead of Gorizia from the South. Mount San Michele was briefly held by Italian forces, but was recaptured during a desperate counterattack by Colonel Richter, who commanded a group of elite regiments.

In the northern section of the front, the Julian Alps, the Italians managed to overrun Mount Batognica over Kobarid (Caporetto), which would have an important strategic value in future battles.

The battle wore down when both sides ran out of ammunition. The total casualties during the three-week battle were about 91,000 men, of which 43,000 Italians and 48,000 Austro-Hungarians.

== See also ==
- Battles of the Isonzo – overview
  - First Battle of the Isonzo – 23 June – 7 July 1915
  - Third Battle of the Isonzo – 18 October – 3 November 1915
