= Fifth Battle of the Isonzo =

1916 battle by the Soča River, Slovenia

Coordinates: 46°04′41″N 13°38′04″E

- Part of the Italian Front (World War I)
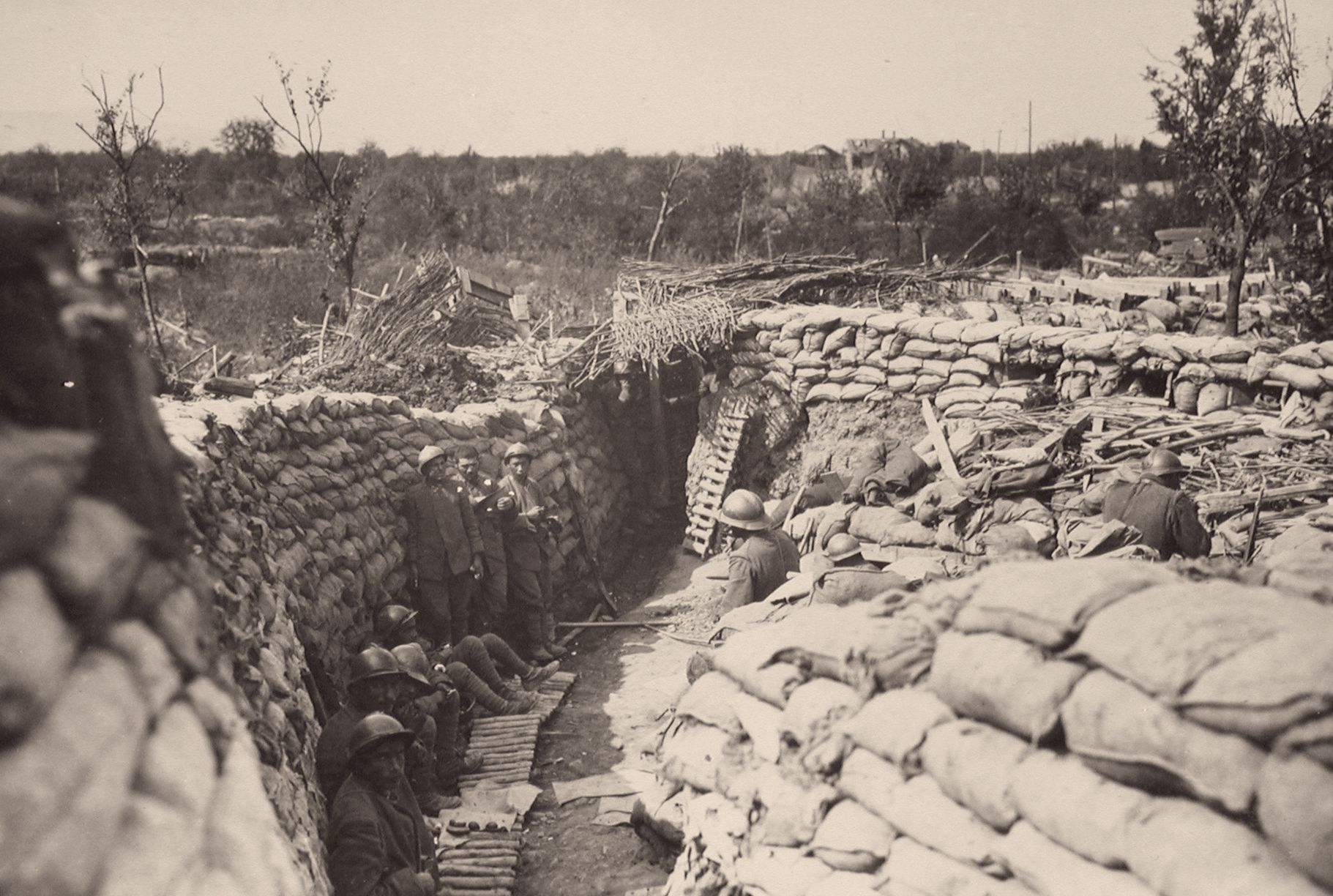
- Italian trenches at the beginning of the Fifth Battle of the Isonzo
Date	9–15 March 1916
Location	Soča river, western Slovenia
Result	Inconclusive

Belligerents
Italy	Austria-Hungary

Commanders and leaders
(Kingdom of Italy) Luigi Cadorna; (Kingdom of Italy) Pietro Frugoni; (Kingdom of Italy) Prince Emanuele Filiberto	(Austria-Hungary) Conrad von Hötzendorf; (Austria-Hungary) Archduke Eugen; (Austria-Hungary) Svetozar Boroević; (Austria-Hungary) Franz Rohr von Denta

Strength
286 battalions (plus 90 in reserve); 1,360 guns	100 battalions (plus 30 in reserve); 470 guns

Casualties and losses
1,882 killed, wounded and missing	1,985 killed and wounded

The Fifth Battle of the Isonzo was fought from 9 to 15 March 1916 between the armies of the Kingdom of Italy and those of Austria-Hungary. The Italians had decided to launch another offensive on the Soča (Isonzo) River.

== Background ==
After four attempts to cross the Soča river and invade Austro-Hungarian territory, Luigi Cadorna, the Italian commander-in-chief, organized a new offensive following the winter decline in fighting which had allowed the Italian High Command to regroup and organize eight new divisions on the front.

The offensive was not launched after detailed strategic planning, but rather as a distraction to shift Central Powers away from the Eastern Front and from Verdun. The attack was a result of the allied Chantilly Conference of December 1915.

== The battle ==
Starting on 11 March with a two-day artillery bombardment, the fifth battle concentrated on the middle reach of the river between Tolmin and Monte San Michele (Debela griža). The Italians unsuccessfully attempted to take Podgora Hill from Dalmatian soldiers.

Several kilometers away, Italians scaled and took Sabotin (Mont Sabotino) from Austrians, which had been well-planned since the previous winter. Sabotin was the only real gain they made during the battle: offensives elsewhere, including at Mount Mrzli, Tolmin, and the hamlet of San Martino, were unsuccessful.

Snow and fog in the south forced Italians to end attacks after a week of offensive that caused 4.000 casualties for both sides. The demonstrational attacks ordered by Cadorna to the 2nd and 3rd Italian Armies proved to be less bloody than previous battles.

Along certain parts of the front, especially around Gorizia, skirmishes continued between enemy platoons until 30 March and beyond, in a protracted struggle that produced no clear winner.

Cadorna had asked their Russian allies to keep Austria-Hungarian units fighting on the Eastern front to give Cadorna the chance to redeploy his forces at Trentino all while abandoning the offensive.

== Aftermath ==
A Croatian newspaper stated that the offensive had "ended in the same kind of success as the first four." Cadorna concluded that he would need more heavy artillery, and planned a sixth offensive after resupply promises from Italy's allies.

== See also ==
- Battles of the Isonzo – overview
  - Fourth Battle of the Isonzo – 10 November – 2 December 1915
  - Sixth Battle of the Isonzo – 6–17 August 1916, also known as the Battle of Gorizia
