= First Battle of the Isonzo =

Battle in 1915 on the Italian Front during the First World War

Coordinates: 45°56′33″N 13°36′09″E

- Part of the Italian Front (World War I)
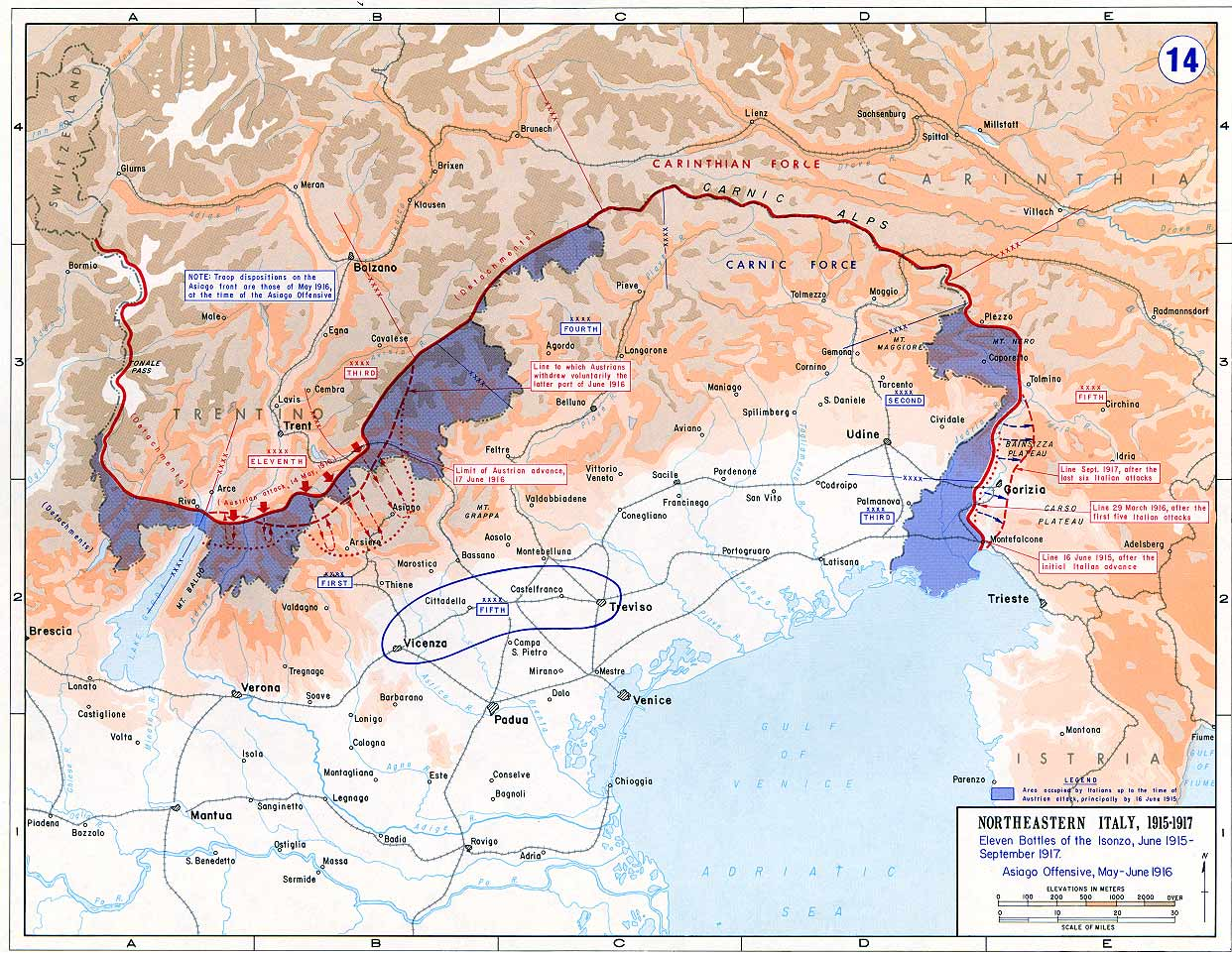
- Eleven Battles of the Isonzo; June 1915 – September 1917
Date	23 June – 7 July 1915
Location	Isonzo river, north-west Slovenia from the mountain Krn to the Gulf of Trieste
Result	Inconclusive

Belligerents
Italy	Austria-Hungary

Commanders and leaders
(Kingdom of Italy) Luigi Cadorna; (Kingdom of Italy) Pietro Frugoni; (Kingdom of Italy) Prince Emanuele Filiberto	(Austria-Hungary) Conrad von Hötzendorf; (Austria-Hungary) Archduke Eugen; (Austria-Hungary) Svetozar Boroević

Strength
225,000: 18 divisions; 252 battalions; 111 cavalry squadrons; 700 guns	115,000: 8 divisions; 84 battalions; 13 cavalry squadrons; 356 guns

Casualties and losses
15,000	10,000

The First Battle of the Isonzo was fought between the armies of Italy and Austria-Hungary on the northeastern Italian Front in World War I, between 23 June and 7 July 1915.

The aim of the Italian Army was to drive the Austrians away from its defensive positions along the Soča (Isonzo) river and surrounding mountains and hopefully capture the port of Trieste.

Although the Italians enjoyed a 2:1 numeric superiority, their offensive failed because the Italian commander, Luigi Cadorna, employed frontal assaults after impressive (but short) artillery barrages. The Austro-Hungarians had the advantage of fighting from uphill positions barricaded with barbed wire which were able to easily resist the Italian assault.

The Italians had some early successes. They partially took Krn (Monte Nero), took Kolovrat Plateau, and captured highlands around Bovec. However, they were unable to dislodge the Austro-Hungarian troops from the high ground between Tolmin and Soča River. The heaviest fighting occurred around Gorizia (Gorica). In addition to the natural defenses of the river and mountains, bastions were created at Oslavia (Oslavje) and Podgora. The fighting at Gorizia consisted of street-by-street urban combat interspersed with artillery fire. Italian troops, such as the Italian Re and Casale Brigades, were able to advance as far as the suburbs but could get no further and were driven back. They made small footholds at Sagrado and Redipuglia on the Karst Plateau southeast of Gorizia but were unable to do much else.

On the Austrian-Hungarian side two commanders distinguished themselves: Major General Géza Lukachich von Somorja, commander of the 5th Mountain Brigade, who retook Redipuglia, and Major General Novak von Arienti who retook Hill 383 (overlooking Plave) with his 1st Mountain Brigade.

Early in July the commander of the Austro-Hungarian Fifth Army, General Svetozar Boroević, received two reinforcement divisions, which put an end to the Italian efforts at breaking through the Austro-Hungarian lines.

The final Italian gains were minimal: in the northern sector, they conquered the heights over Bovec (Mount Kanin); in the southern sector, they conquered the westernmost ridges of the Karst Plateau near Fogliano Redipuglia and Monfalcone. The battle was soon followed by the Second Battle of the Isonzo.

== Involved units ==
Austria-Hungary
5th Army				
VII Corps	XVI Corps	XV Corps		
1st Infantry Division	57th Infantry Division	61st Infantry Division	20th Infantry Division	58th Infantry Division
17th Infantry Division	18th Infantry Division	50th Infantry Division		
187th Infantry Brigade	6th Mountain Brigade	16th Mountain Brigade	14th Mountain Brigade	81st Honvéd Infantry Brigade
39th Honvéd Infantry Brigade	2nd Mountain Brigade	12th Mountain Brigade	5th Mountain Brigade	4th Mountain Brigade
10th Mountain Brigade	1st Mountain Brigade	13th Mountain Brigade	7th Mountain Brigade	15th Mountain Brigade
8th Mountain Brigade	3rd Mountain Brigade			
Reserve				
93rd Infantry Division				
Headquarters				
VII Corps in Kostanjevica	XVI Corps in Dornberg	XV Corps in Kneža		

Italy				
2nd Army	3rd Army			
VII Corps	X Corps	XI Corps	VI Corps	II Corps
IV Corps				
13th Infantry Division	14th Infantry Division	20th Infantry Division	19th Infantry Division	21st Infantry Division
12th Infantry Division	11th Infantry Division	4th Infantry Division	3rd Infantry Division	32nd Infantry Division
7th Infantry Division	8th Infantry Division	Bersaglieri Division	Alpini Group A and B	half 29th Infantry Division
Reserve				
XIV Corps				
half 29th Infantry Division	22nd Infantry Division	28th Infantry Division	30th Infantry Division	23rd Infantry Division
27th Infantry Division	33rd Infantry Division	1st Cavalry Division	2nd Cavalry Division	3rd Cavalry Division
Commanders				
Pietro Frugoni	Emanuele Filiberto			
Headquarters				
2nd Army in Udine	3rd Army in Cervignano			

== See also ==
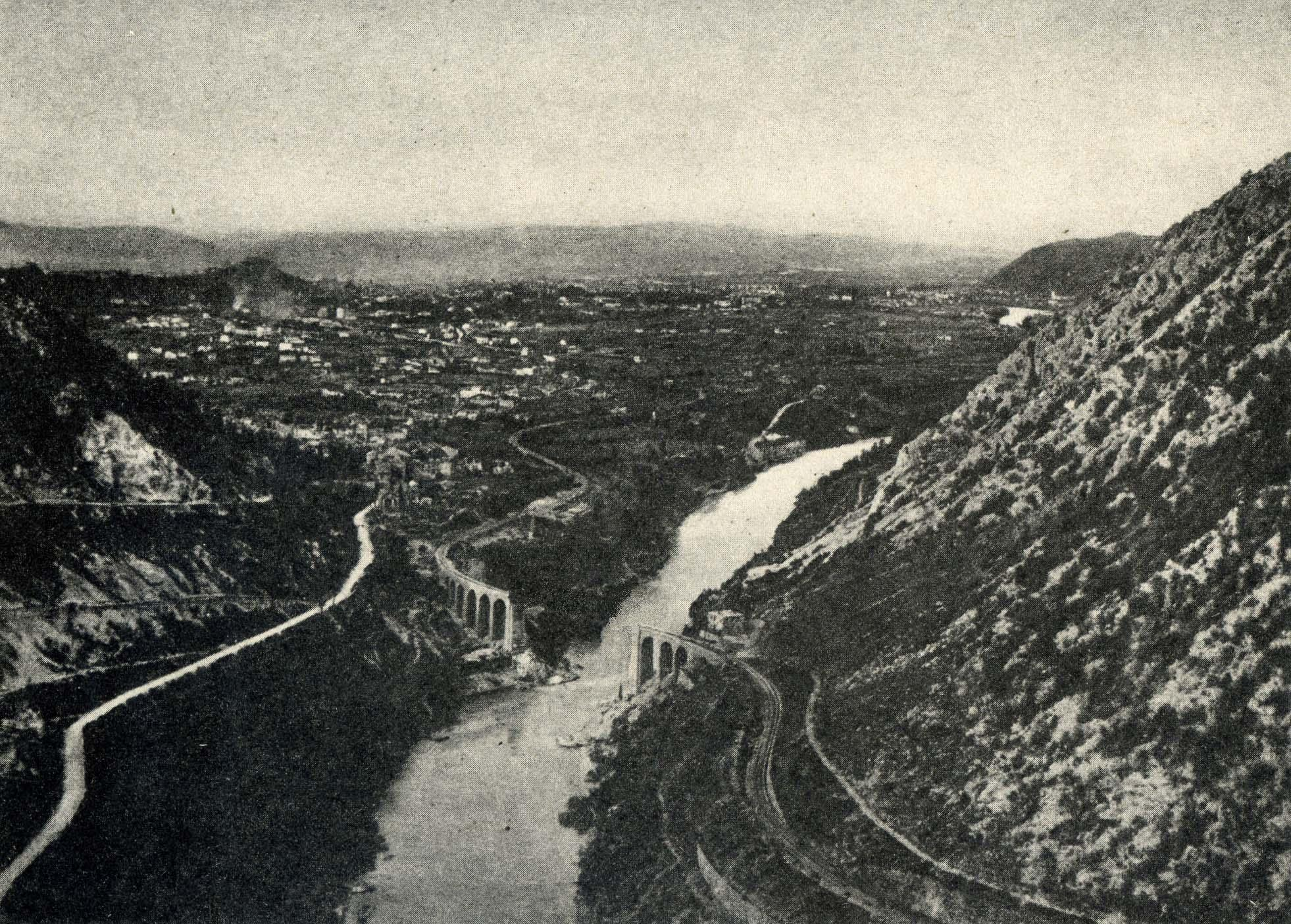
Solkan (left) and the Isonzo

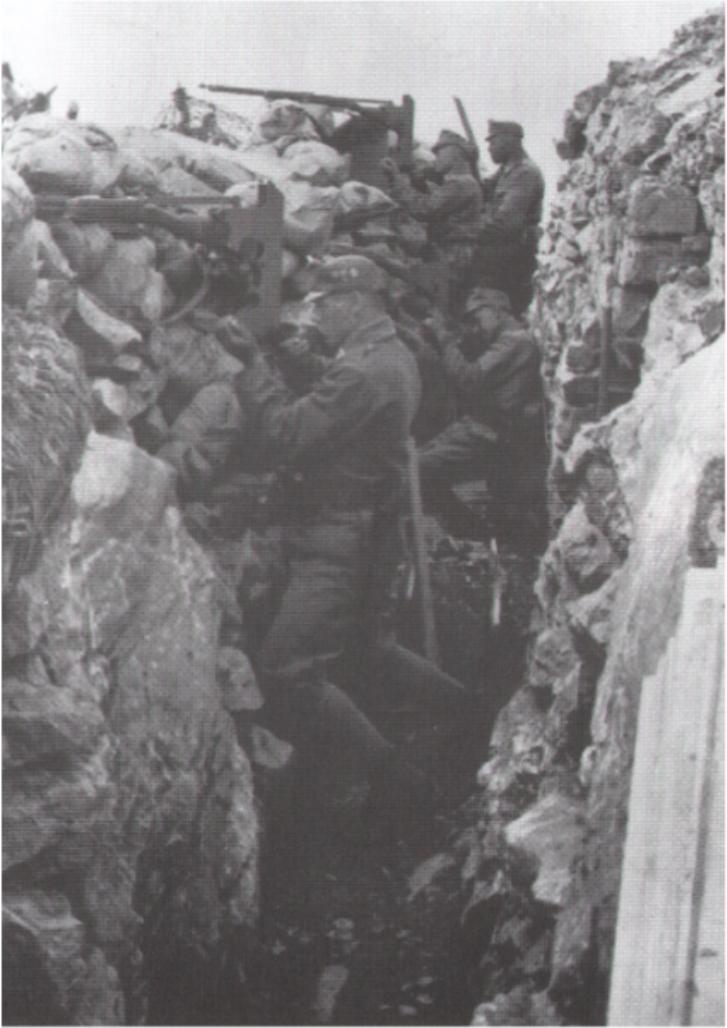
Austro-Hungarian trench at the Soča (Isonzo)

- History of Austria
- Italy in World War I
- Battles of the Isonzo – overview
  - Second Battle of the Isonzo – 18 July – 3 August 1915
