= Battles of the Isonzo =

Series of major battles between Italy and Austria-Hungary during WWI

Isonzo front
- Part of the Italian Front (World War I)
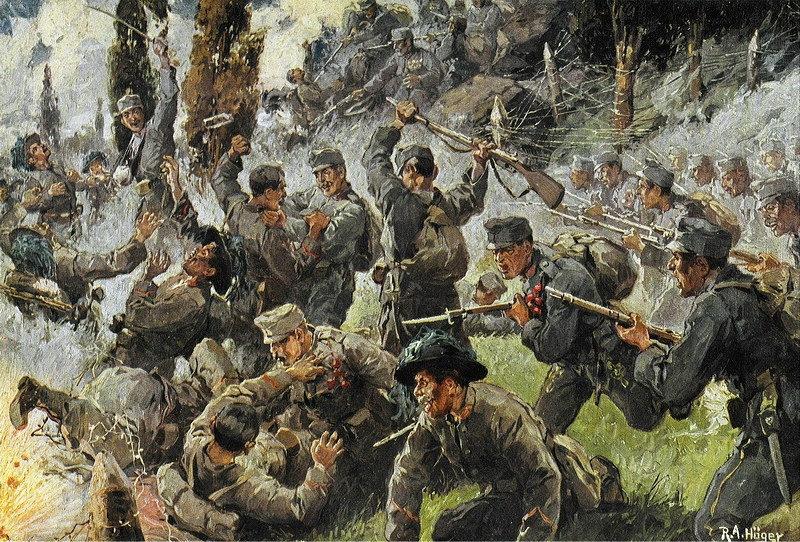
- Depiction of the Battle of Doberdò
Date	24 May 1915 – 27 October 1917 (2 years, 5 months and 4 days)
Location	Isonzo Valley
Result	Five Italian victories; Four inconclusive; Three Austro-Hungarian victories and final Central Powers victory

Belligerents
Italy	Austria-Hungary; Germany (from 1917)

Commanders and leaders
Luigi Cadorna; Pietro Frugoni; Settimio Piacentini; Luigi Capello; Prince Emanuele Filiberto	(Austria-Hungary) Franz von Hötzendorf; (Austria-Hungary) Arthur von Straußenburg; (Austria-Hungary) Archduke Eugen; Svetozar Borojević; Otto von Below

Units involved
2nd Army; 3rd Army	5th Army

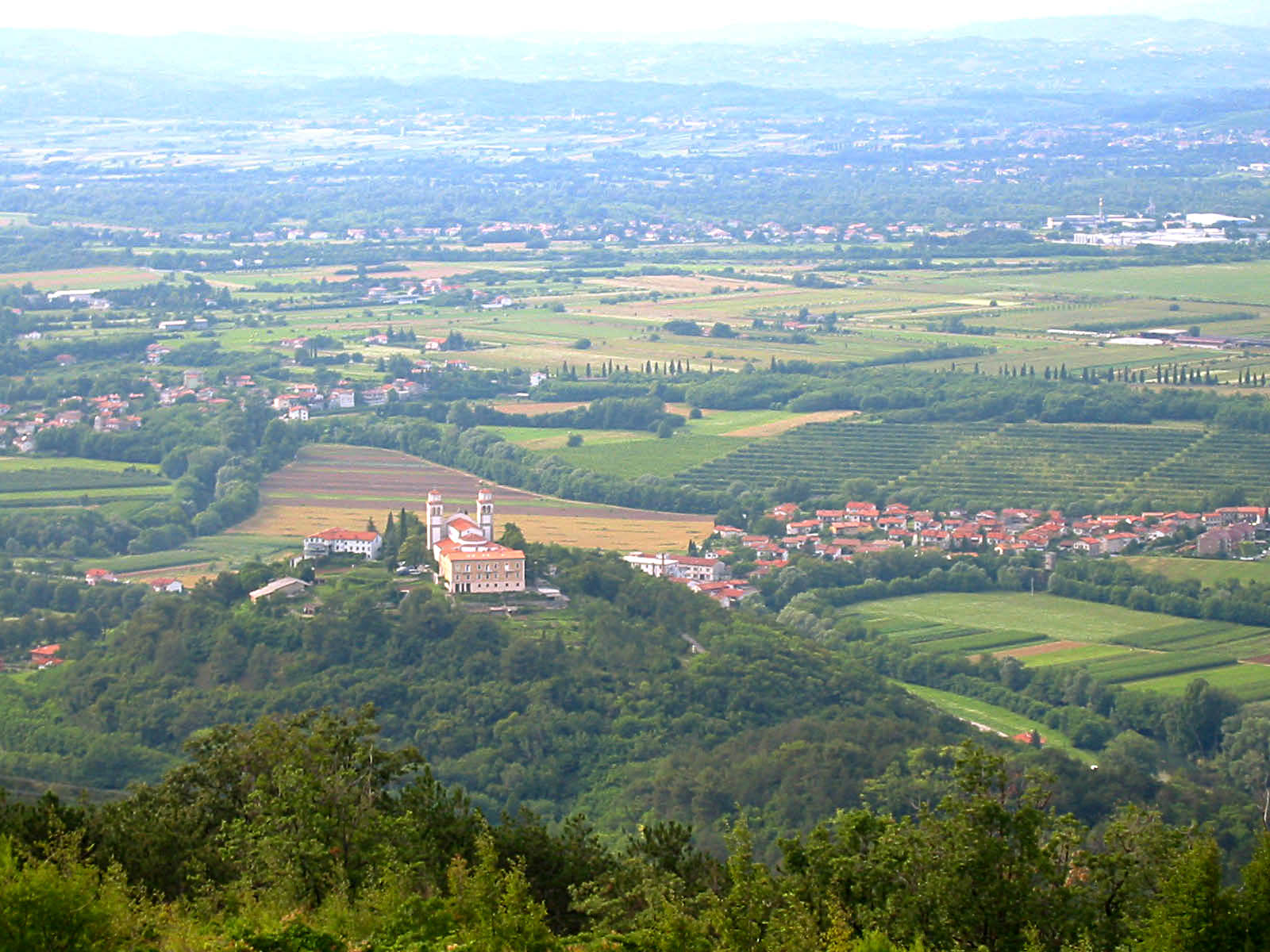
The plain at the confluence of the Isonzo (Slovene: Soča) and Vipava rivers around Gorizia is the main passage from Northern Italy to Central Europe.

The Battles of the Isonzo (also known as the Isonzo Front by historians, or the Soča Front; Slovene: soška fronta) were a series of eleven or twelve battles between the Austro-Hungarian and Italian armies in World War I mostly on the territory of present-day Slovenia, and the remainder in Italy along the Isonzo (Slovene: Soča) River on the eastern sector of the Italian Front between June 1915 and November 1917.

== Overview ==
In April 1915, in the secret Treaty of London, Italy was promised by the Entente some of the territories of Austro-Hungarian Empire, including Trentino and Trieste, in exchange for entering the war on the side of the Entente.

Italian commander Luigi Cadorna, entering the war with the belief that a frontal assault would achieve a breakthrough, opted for an offensive on the Isonzo River. He initially planned to capture the main Italian objectives on the east (Gorizia, Trieste) and break onto the Slovenian plateau, taking Ljubljana and threatening Vienna.

In response, the Austro-Hungarians were forced to move some of their forces from the Eastern Front and a war in the mountains around the Isonzo River began. The conflict evolved into a type of trench warfare similar to the Western Front. The area between the northernmost part of the Adriatic Sea and the sources of the Isonzo River thus became the scene of twelve successive battles between 1915 and 1917. Italian troops did not reach the port of Trieste, the Italian General Luigi Cadorna's initial target, until after the Armistice.

== Geography ==
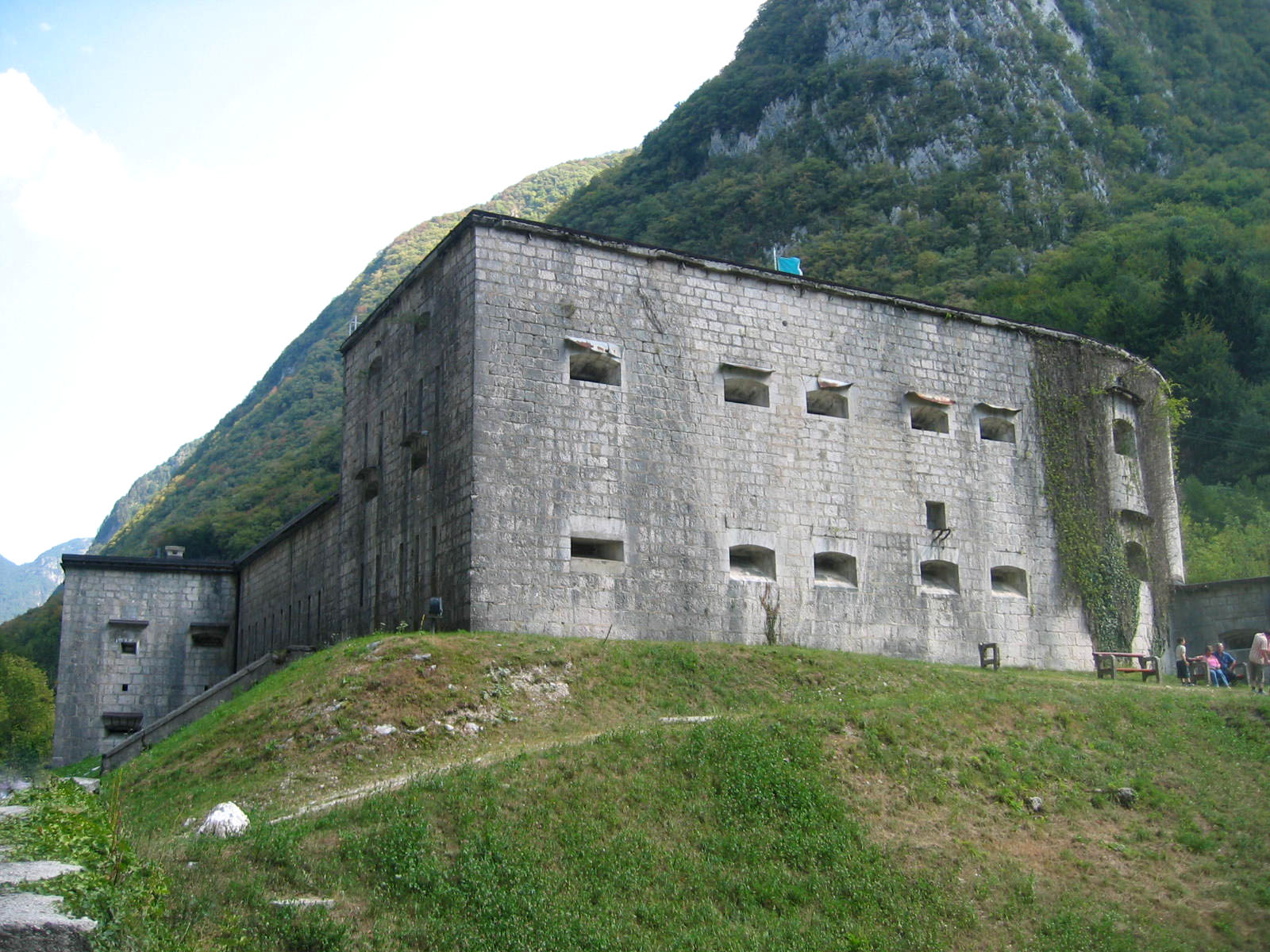
Remains of Kluže, an Austro-Hungarian fortification between Bovec and Log pod Mangrtom

The 138-kilometre (86 mi) long Isonzo River at the time ran entirely inside Austria-Hungary in parallel to the border with Italy, from the Vršič pass in the Julian Alps to the Adriatic Sea, widening dramatically a few kilometers north of Gorizia, thus opening a narrow corridor between Northern Italy and Central Europe, which goes through the Vipava Valley and the relatively low north-eastern edge of the Postojna Gate to Inner Carniola and Ljubljana.

Much of the 640-kilometre (400 mi) front was highly mountainous, and dominated by Austro-Hungarian forces. This left the Isonzo as the only practical area for Italian military operations during the war. The Austro-Hungarian defensive structures are mostly concentrated around Bovec, near the source of the river, including the Kluže Fortress. While troops were stationed all across the border region, the rest of the border remained lightly-fortified.

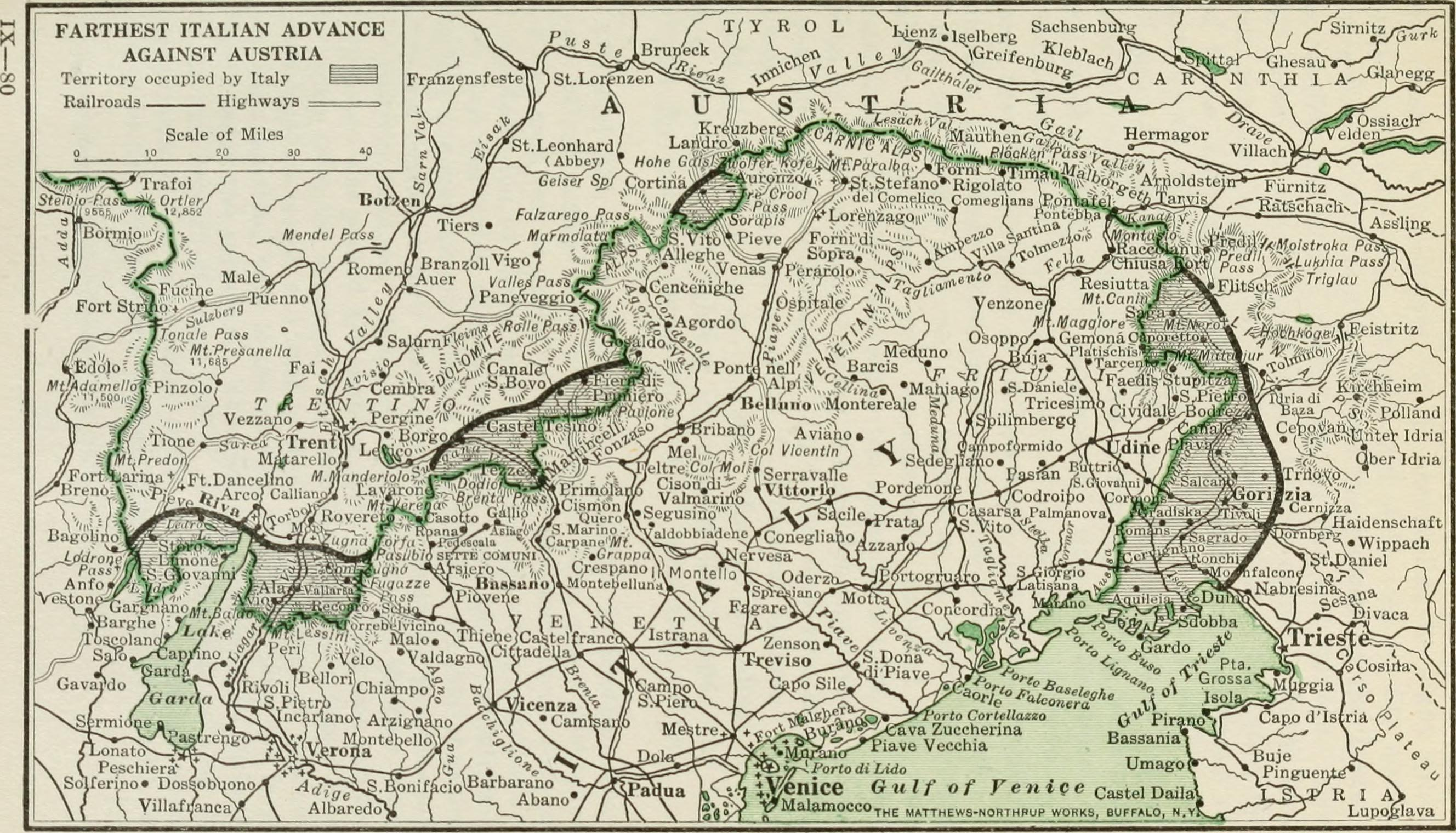
Northeast Italy, farthest Italian advance against Austria-Hungary

== Casualties ==
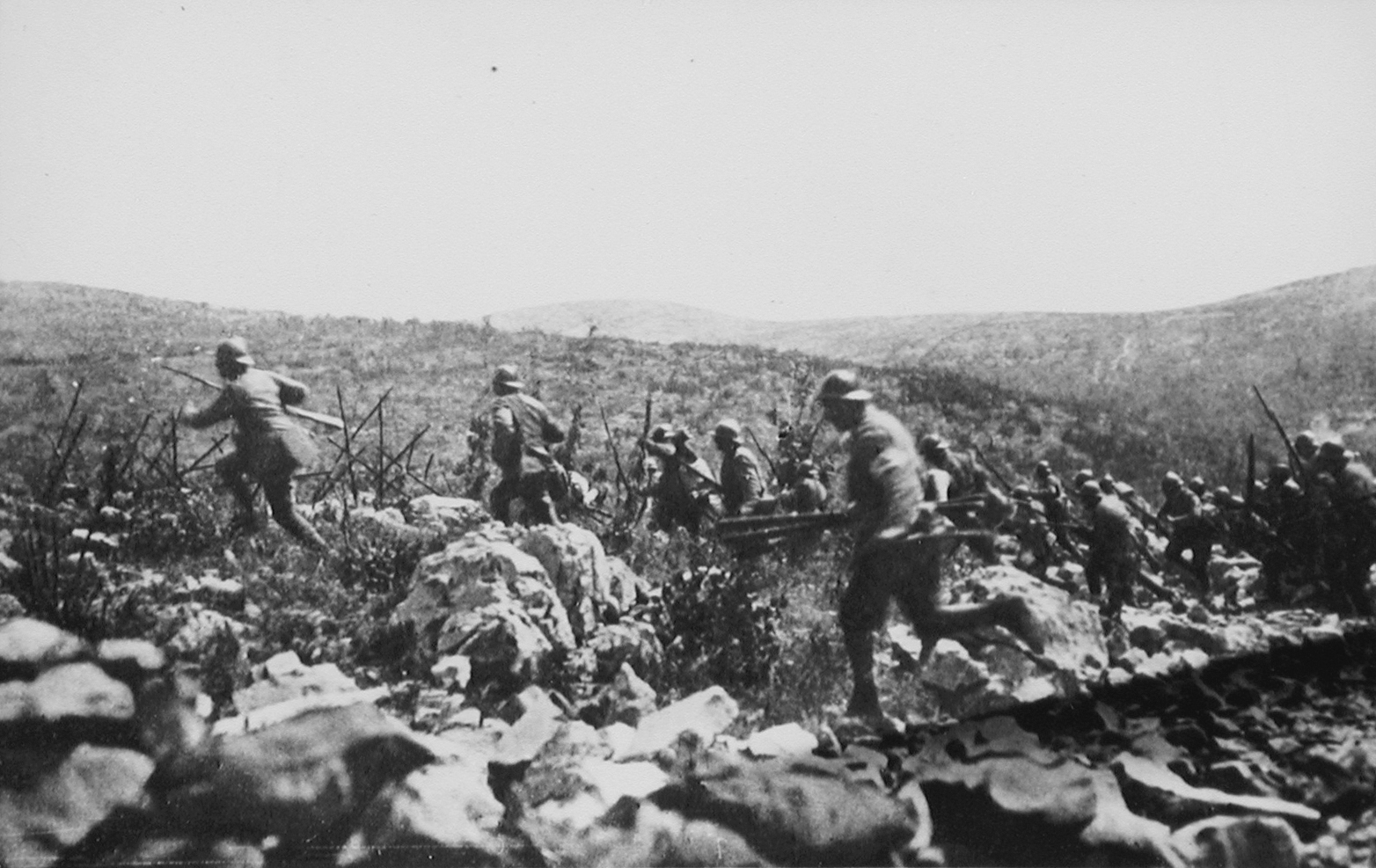
Italian infantry leaving the trenches, 1916

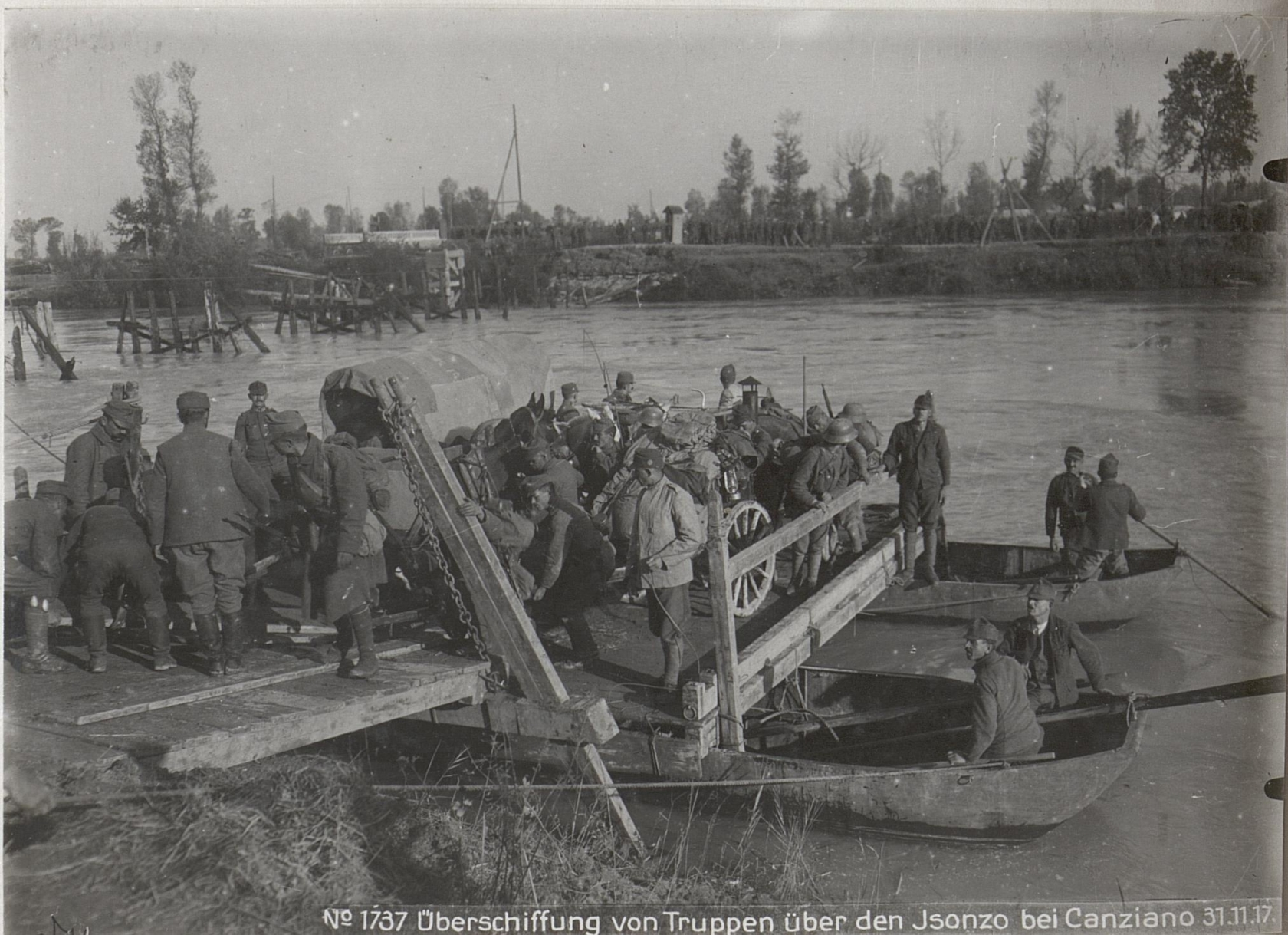
Austrian troops crossing the Isonzo, November 1917

The casualty estimates vary greatly for the battles. Writing for 1914–1918 Online, Pierluigi Scolè estimated the Italian losses at least 800,000 casulties for the first eleven battles of Isonzo with 191,000 deaths, and 460,000 casulties for the twelfth battle including 37,000 deaths, while Alessandro Salvador writing for the same project calculated the total deaths from both sides at 728,754 for the first eleven battles. The Austro-Hungarian casualties have been estimated at 395,000 for the first eleven battles.

More than 30,000 casualties were ethnic Slovenes, who at the time were citizens of Austria and thus, the majority of them served in the Austro-Hungarian Army, while Slovene civilian inhabitants from the Gorizia and Gradisca region also suffered in many thousands because they were resettled in refugee camps. These Slovene refugees were treated as state enemies in Italian refugee camps, where thousands died of malnutrition.

== Number of battles ==
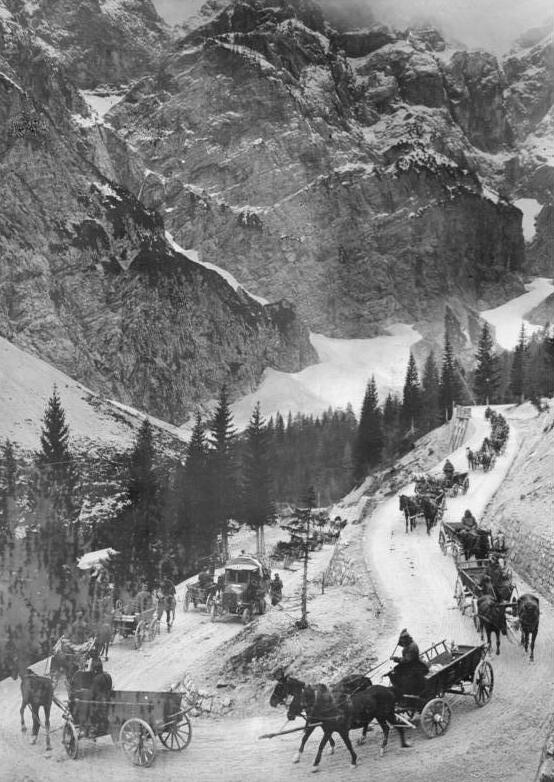
Austro-Hungarian supply line over the Vršič Pass. October 1917

With almost continuous combat in the area, the precise number of battles forming the Isonzo campaign is debated. Some battles are known by a distinct name rather than just one of the battles of Isonzo, most notably the Battle of Caporetto in October 1917, which is also referred to as the Twelfth Battle of the Isonzo.

The fact that the battles were always named after the Isonzo River, even in Italy, was considered by some a propaganda success for Austria-Hungary: it highlighted the repeated Italian failure to breach this landmark frontier of the Empire.

The Isonzo campaign comprised the following battles:

- First Battle of the Isonzo – 23 June – 7 July 1915
- Second Battle of the Isonzo – 18 July – 3 August 1915
- Third Battle of the Isonzo – 18 October – 3 November 1915
- Fourth Battle of the Isonzo – 10 November – 2 December 1915
- Fifth Battle of the Isonzo – 9–17 March 1916
- Sixth Battle of the Isonzo – 6–17 August 1916, also known as the Battle of Gorizia
- Seventh Battle of the Isonzo – 14–17 September 1916
- Eighth Battle of the Isonzo – 10–12 October 1916
- Ninth Battle of the Isonzo – 1–4 November 1916
- Tenth Battle of the Isonzo – 12 May – 8 June 1917
- Eleventh Battle of the Isonzo – 19 August – 12 September 1917
- Twelfth Battle of the Isonzo – 24 October – 7 November 1917, also known as the Battle of Caporetto

Brief summary of Isonzo battles
Battle	Dates	Italian casualties	Austro-Hungarian casualties	Outcome
First Battle of the Isonzo	23 June – 7 July 1915	15,000	10,000	Inconclusive
Second Battle of the Isonzo	18 July – 3 August 1915	41,800	46,600	Italian victory
Third Battle of the Isonzo	18 October – 3 November 1915	66,998	41,847	Austro-Hungarian victory
Fourth Battle of the Isonzo	10 November – 2 December 1915	49,500	32,100	Italian victory
Fifth Battle of the Isonzo	9–15 March 1916	1,882	1,985	Inconclusive
Sixth Battle of the Isonzo	6–17 August 1916	51,000	42,000	Italian victory
Seventh Battle of the Isonzo	14–18 September 1916	17,000	15,000	Italian victory
Eighth Battle of the Isonzo	10 October 1916 – 12 October 1916	55,000	38,000	Inconclusive
Ninth Battle of the Isonzo	31 October – 4 November 1916	39,000	33,000	Austro-Hungarian victory, Italian advance halted
Tenth Battle of the Isonzo	10 May – 8 June 1917	150,000	125,000	Limited Italian advance
Eleventh Battle of the Isonzo	18 August – 12 September 1917	158,000	115,000	Italian victory
Twelfth Battle of the Isonzo	24 October – 19 November 1917	305,000	70,000	Austro-Hungarian-German victory; end of the Isonzo Campaign
Total casualties	June 1915 – November 1917	950,180	570,532	Central Powers victory, counteroffensives on the Piave river (First and Second battle)

== In media ==
- Ernest Hemingway's A Farewell to Arms is partly during the events along this front.
- Italian poet Giuseppe Ungaretti's autobiographical poem I Fiumi was written about the Isonzo whilst he was stationed on the front.
- Mark Helprin's A Soldier of the Great War refers to parts of the Isonzo campaign.
- The twelfth battle is the subject of the novel Caporetto by the Swedish author F. J. Nordstedt, Stockholm 1972.
- The Isonzo Front is the theme for the video game Isonzo by Blackmill Games.
- A fictional battle at Štanjel is featured in the video game Battlefield 1 as one of the playable maps.

== Sources ==
- Thompson, Mark (2009). The White War: Life and Death on the Italian Front, 1915-1919. Faber & Faber. ISBN 978-0571223336.
