= Soča =

Slovenian-Italian river

Coordinates: 45°59′40″N 13°38′29″E

Soča/Isonzo
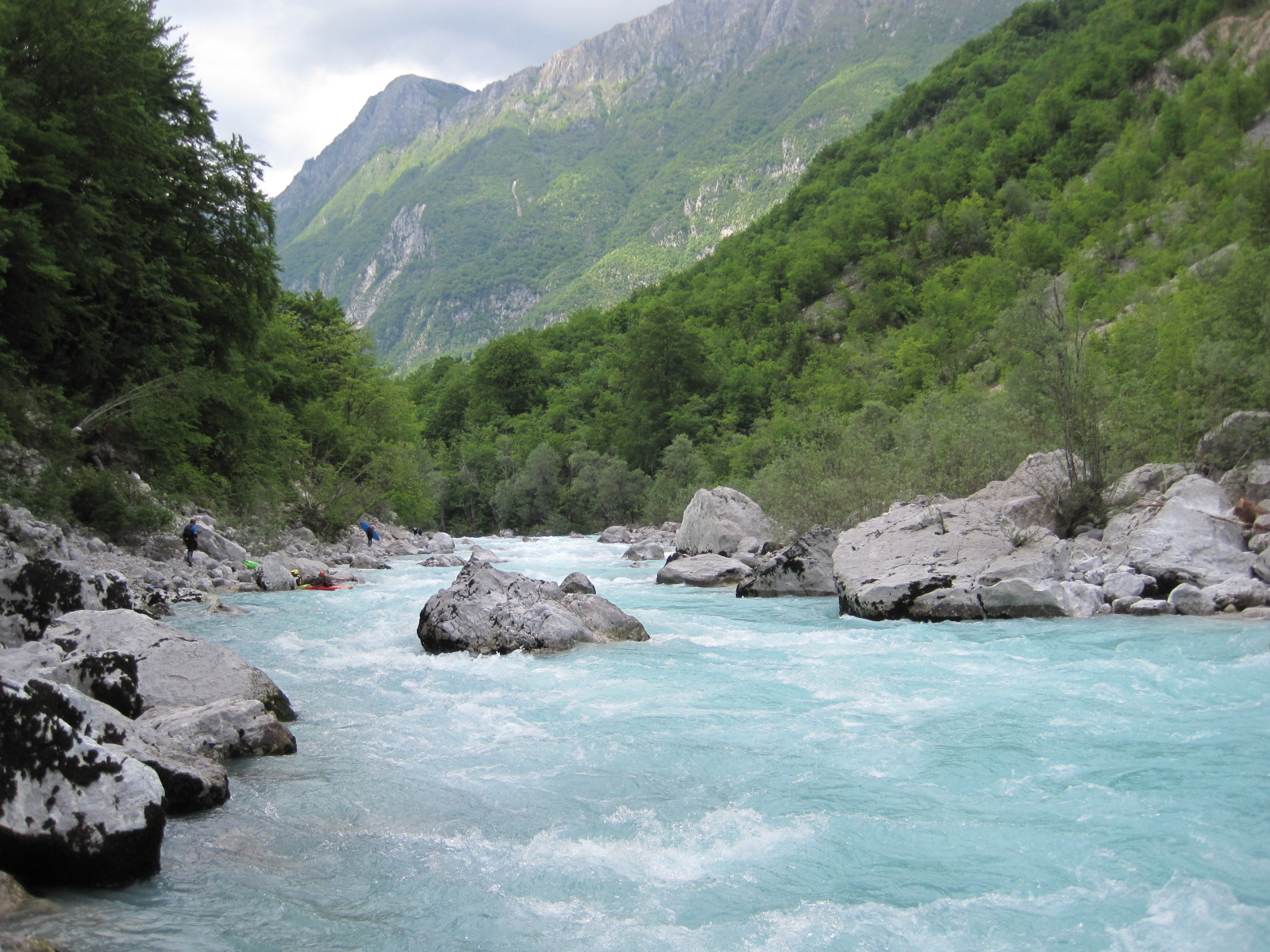
- The Soča near Bovec

Location
- Country: Slovenia, Italy

Physical characteristics
- Source
  - location: Julian Alps, west of Triglav
  - elevation: 876 m (2,874 ft)
- Mouth
  - location: Adriatic Sea, near Monfalcone
- Length: 138 km (86 mi)
- Basin size: 3,400 km^{2} (1,300 mi^{2})
- Discharge
  - average: 172 m^{3}/s (6,100 cu ft/s)

The Soča (Slovene: [ˈsòːtʃa], in Slovene) or Isonzo (Italian: [iˈzontso], in Italian; other names: Friulian: Lusinç; German: Sontig; Latin: Aesontius or Isontius) is a 138-kilometre (86 mi) long river that flows through western Slovenia (96 kilometres or 60 miles) and northeastern Italy (43 kilometres or 27 miles).

An Alpine river in character, its source lies in the Trenta Valley in the Julian Alps in northwestern Slovenia, at an elevation of 876 metres (2,874 ft). The river runs past the towns of Bovec, Kobarid, Tolmin, Kanal ob Soči, Nova Gorica (where it is crossed by the Solkan Bridge), and Gorizia, entering the Adriatic Sea close to the town of Monfalcone. It has a nival-pluvial regime in its upper course and pluvial-nival in its lower course.

Prior to the First World War, the river ran parallel to the border between the Kingdom of Italy and the Austro-Hungarian Empire. During World War I, it was the scene of bitter fighting between the two countries, culminating in the Battle of Caporetto in October and November 1917.

== Name ==
The river was recorded in antiquity as Aesontius, Sontius, and Isontius. Later attestations include super Sontium (in 507–11), a flumine Isontio (1028), in Lisonçum (1261), an die Ysnicz (1401), and an der Snicz (ca. 1440). The Slovene name Soča is derived from the form *Sǫťa, which was borrowed from Latin (and Romance) Sontius. In turn, this is probably based on the substrate name *Aisontia, presumably derived from the PIE root *Hei̯s- 'swift, rushing', referring to a quickly moving river. Another possible origin is the pre-Romance root *ai̯s- 'water, river'.

== Major changes in the watershed ==
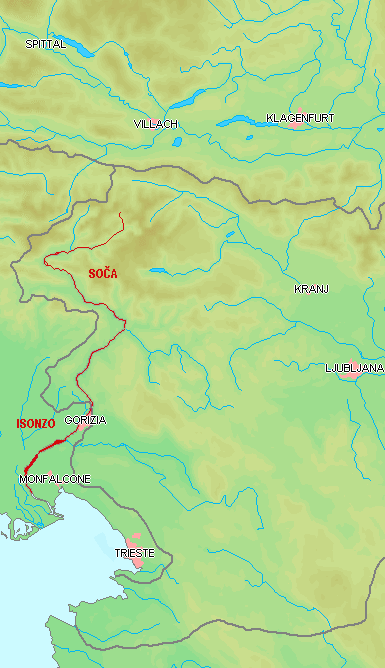
Course of the Soča/Isonzo

The present course of the river is the result of several dramatic changes that occurred during the past 2,000 years. According to the Roman historian Strabo, the river named Aesontius, which in Roman times flowed past Aquileia to the Adriatic Sea, was essentially the Natisone and Torre River system.

In 585, a landslide cut off the upper part of the Natisone riverbed, causing its avulsion and subsequent stream capture by the Bontius River. The original subterranean discharge of the Bontius into the Timavo River became obstructed, and another avulsion returned the new watercourse into the bed of the lower Natisone.

During the next centuries the estuary of this new river—the Soča—moved eastward until it captured the short coastal Sdobba River, through which the Isonzo now discharges into the Adriatic Sea. The former estuary (of the Aesontius, and the early Isonzo) in the newly formed lagoon of Grado became an independent coastal rivulet.

== Attractions ==
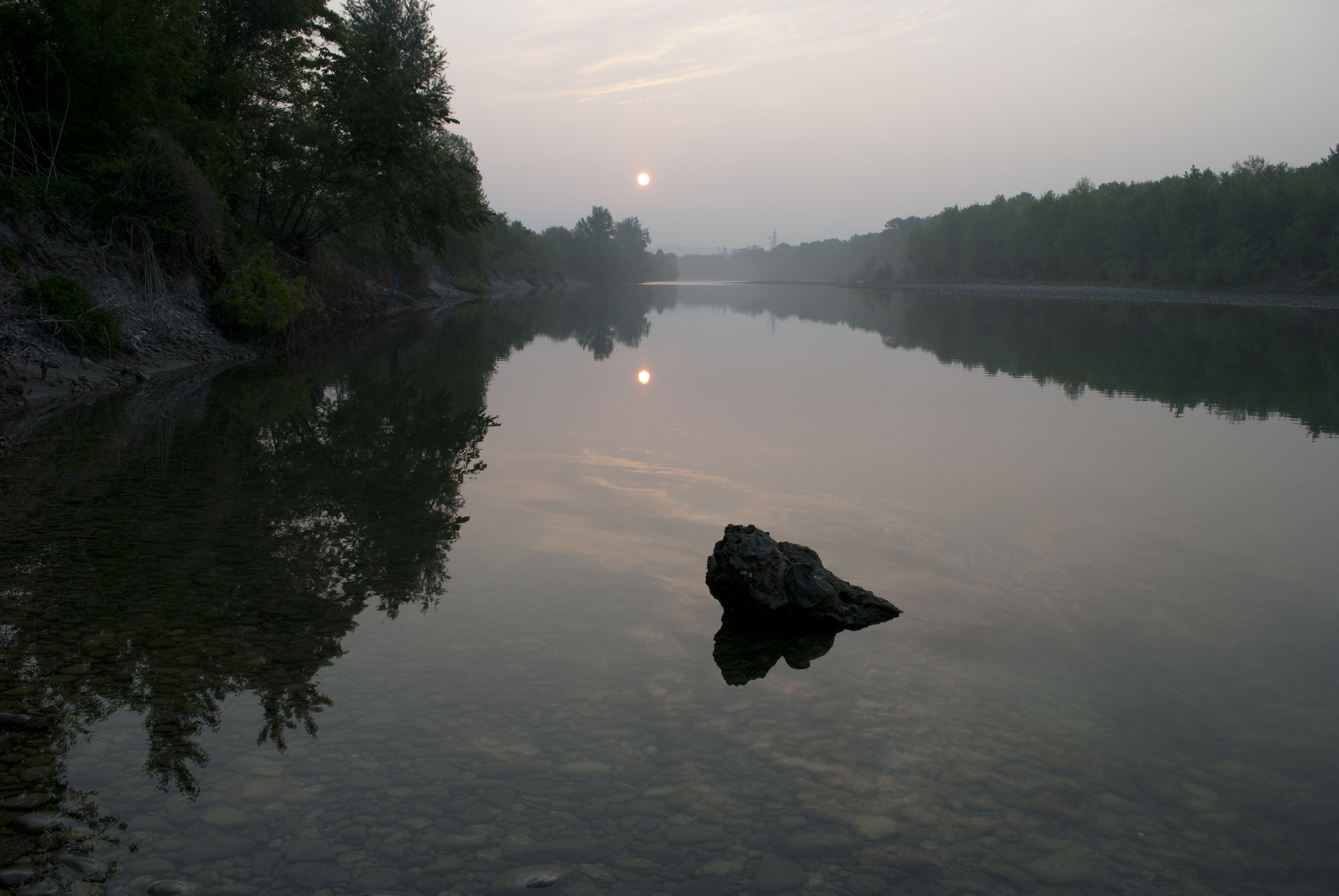
The Isonzo River in Italy

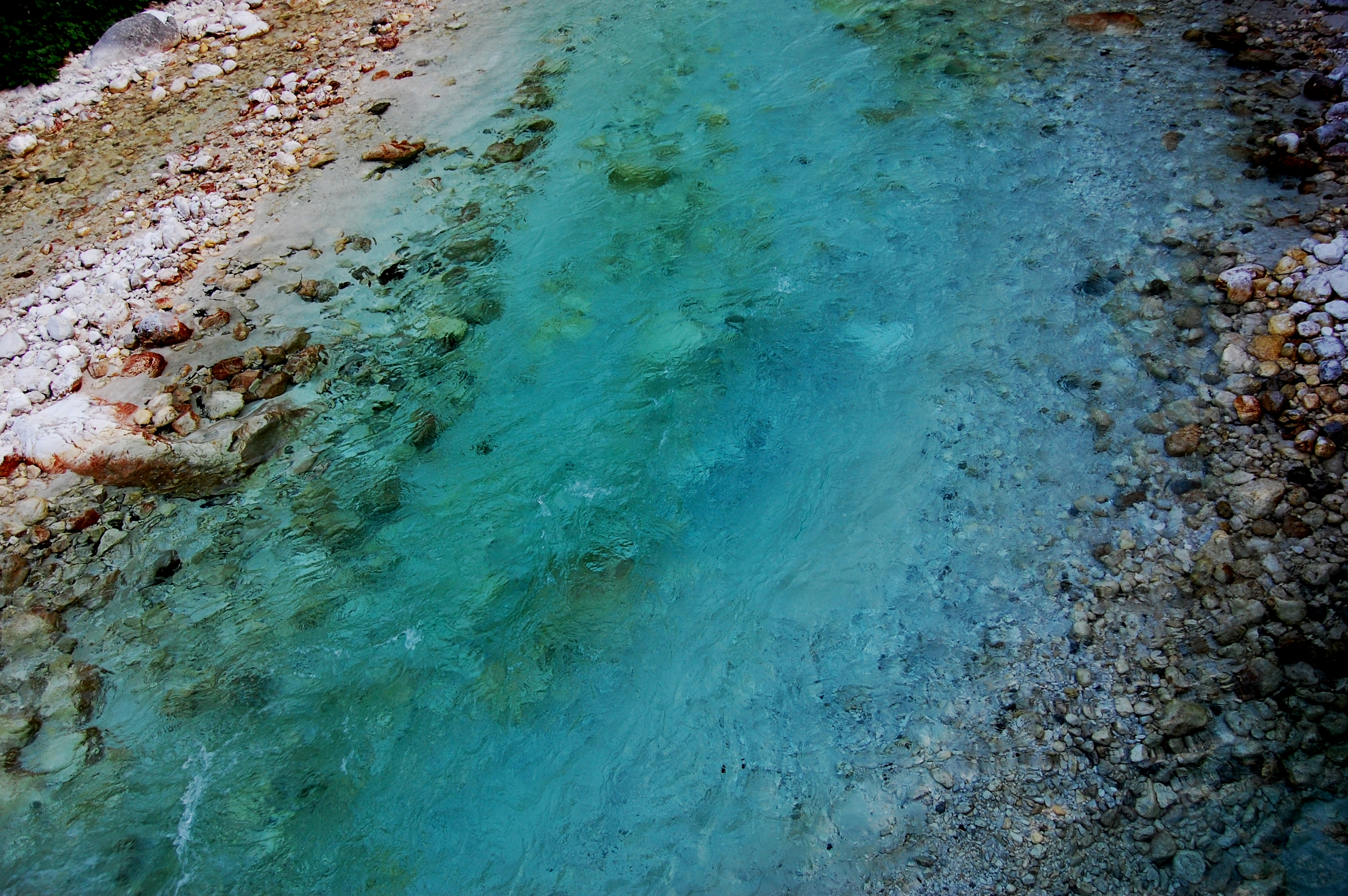
The Soča River

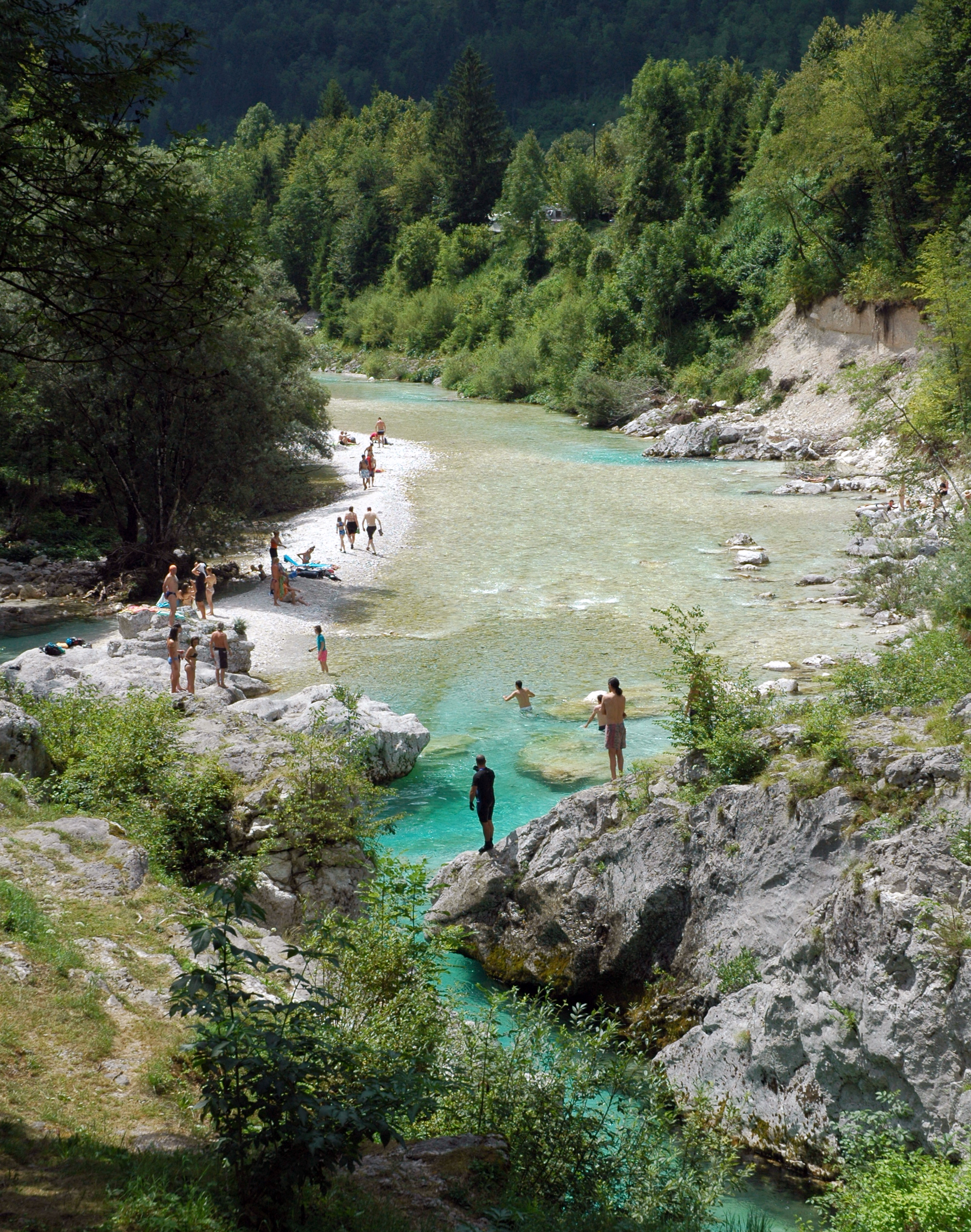
Recreation on the Soča River near Trenta, Slovenia

Due to its emerald-green water, the river is marketed as "The Emerald Beauty." It is said to be one of the rare rivers in the world that retain such a colour throughout their length. Giuseppe Ungaretti, one of the greatest Italian poets, describes the Isonzo in the poem "I fiumi" (The Rivers; 1916).

The river inspired the poet Simon Gregorčič to write his best-known poem Soči (To the Soča), one of the masterpieces of Slovene poetry. This region served as a location for the 2008 Disney film Chronicles of Narnia: Prince Caspian.

The river is also well known for the marble trout (Salmo marmoratus); this species is native to rivers of the northern Adriatic basin, and it lives in the upper course of the river. This species is endangered due to the introduction of other non-indigenous trout species sometime between World War I and World War II.

The Soča Valley is a popular tourist destination due to its numerous natural attractions, including the Big Soča Gorge (Velika korita Soče), the Little Soča Gorge (Mala korita Soče), Kozjak Falls, Virje Falls, and the Tolmin Gorges (Tolminska korita).

== Significance in World War I ==
The valley was the stage of major military operations including the twelve battles of the Isonzo on the Italian front in World War I between May 1915 and November 1917, in which over half a million Austro-Hungarian and Italian soldiers were killed.

The Isonzo campaign comprised the following battles:

- First Battle of the Isonzo: 23 June – 7 July 1915
- Second Battle of the Isonzo: 18 July – 3 August 1915
- Third Battle of the Isonzo: 18 October – 3 November 1915
- Fourth Battle of the Isonzo: 10 November – 2 December 1915
- Fifth Battle of the Isonzo: 9–17 March 1916
- Sixth Battle of the Isonzo: 6–17 August 1916
- Seventh Battle of the Isonzo: 14–17 September 1916
- Eighth Battle of the Isonzo: 10–12 October 1916
- Ninth Battle of the Isonzo: 1–4 November 1916
- Tenth Battle of the Isonzo: 12 May – 8 June 1917
- Eleventh Battle of the Isonzo: 19 August – 12 September 1917
- Twelfth Battle of the Isonzo: 24 October – 7 November 1917, also known as the Battle of Caporetto

== See also ==
- Karst topography
- Battles of the Isonzo
- Gorizia
- Goriška
