= Luigi Cadorna =

Italian general and count (1850–1928)

Maresciallo d'Italia Luigi Cadorna OSML OMS OCI
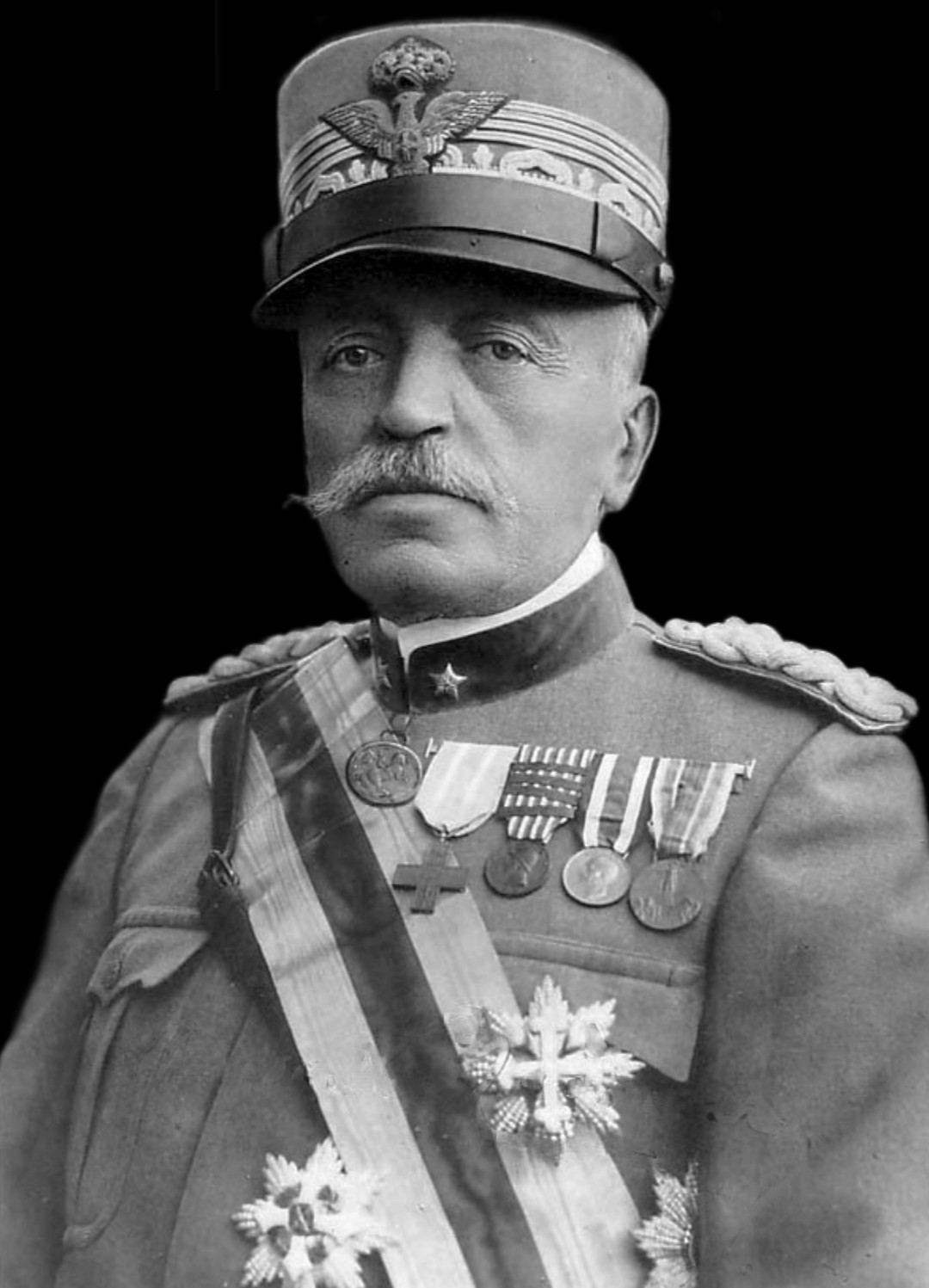
- Cadorna in 1917

Chief of Staff of the Royal Italian Army
- In office 27 July 1914 – 9 November 1917
- Preceded by: Alberto Pollio
- Succeeded by: Armando Diaz

Personal details
- Born: 4 September 1850 Verbania, Kingdom of Sardinia
- Died: 21 December 1928 (aged 78) Bordighera, Kingdom of Italy
- Profession: Military officer
- Awards: Order of the Bath, Grand Cross

Military service
- Allegiance: Kingdom of Italy
- Branch/service: Royal Italian Army
- Years of service: 1865–1917
- Rank: Marshal of Italy; General
- Battles/wars: World War I: Italian Front; Battles of the Isonzo; Strafexpedition; Battle of Caporetto

Luigi Cadorna, OSML, OMS, OCI (4 September 1850 – 21 December 1928) was an Italian general, Marshal of Italy and Count, most famous for being the Chief of Staff of the Italian Army from 1914 until late 1917 during World War I. He commanded the Italian army on the Italian front, a theatre marked by trench warfare and attrition on the Eastern Alps and Isonzo river. Cadorna launched multiple offensives across the Isonzo front during which the Italian army made gains, most notably capturing Gorizia (after counterattacking during the Strafexpedition) and Bainsizza, but it ultimately suffered a major defeat when German-Austrian forces attacked the Italian troops at Caporetto and forced them to retreat to the Piave river. He was relieved as Chief of Staff and replaced by Armando Diaz.

Cadorna's wartime leadership is a debated topic in public discourse and historiography. His detractors blame him for heavy casualties and a rigid discipline leading to the harsh treatment of Italian troops (with the alleged introduction of decimation), but others have ascribed merits to Cadorna and argued that high casualties were a consequence of the tactical-strategic realities of the war.

== Early career ==
Luigi Cadorna was born to General Raffaele Cadorna in Verbania Pallanza, Piedmont in 1850. In 1860, Cadorna became a student at the "Teuliè" Military School in Milan. At fifteen he entered the Turin Military Academy. Upon graduation, he was commissioned as a second lieutenant of artillery in 1868. In 1870, as an officer in the 2nd Regiment of Artillery, Cadorna participated in the occupation of Rome as part of a force commanded by his father. As major he was appointed to the staff of General Pianell, afterwards taking the post of Chief of Staff of the Verona Divisional Command. As Colonel commanding the 10th Regiment of Bersaglieri from 1892 Cadorna acquired a reputation for strict discipline and harsh punishment. He wrote a manual of infantry tactics, which laid stress on the doctrine of the offensive. Promoted to lieutenant general in 1898 Cadorna subsequently held a number of senior staff and divisional/corps command positions. On the eve of Italy's entry into World War (1915), he was close to peace-time retirement age and had a history of differences with his political and military superiors.

Cadorna had been offered the post of Chief of Staff for the first time in 1908, which he had rejected over the issue of political control during wartime. He was again offered the position in July 1914, as the Triple Entente and Central Powers girded for war. When Italy entered the war in May 1915 on the side of the Entente, Cadorna fielded thirty-six infantry divisions composed of 875,000 men, but with only 120 modern artillery pieces.

== First World War ==
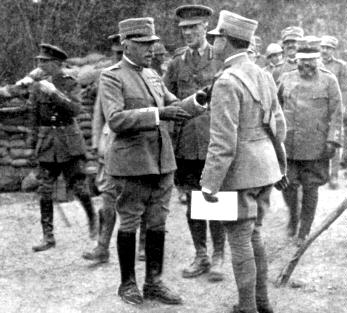
General Cadorna visiting British batteries during World War I.

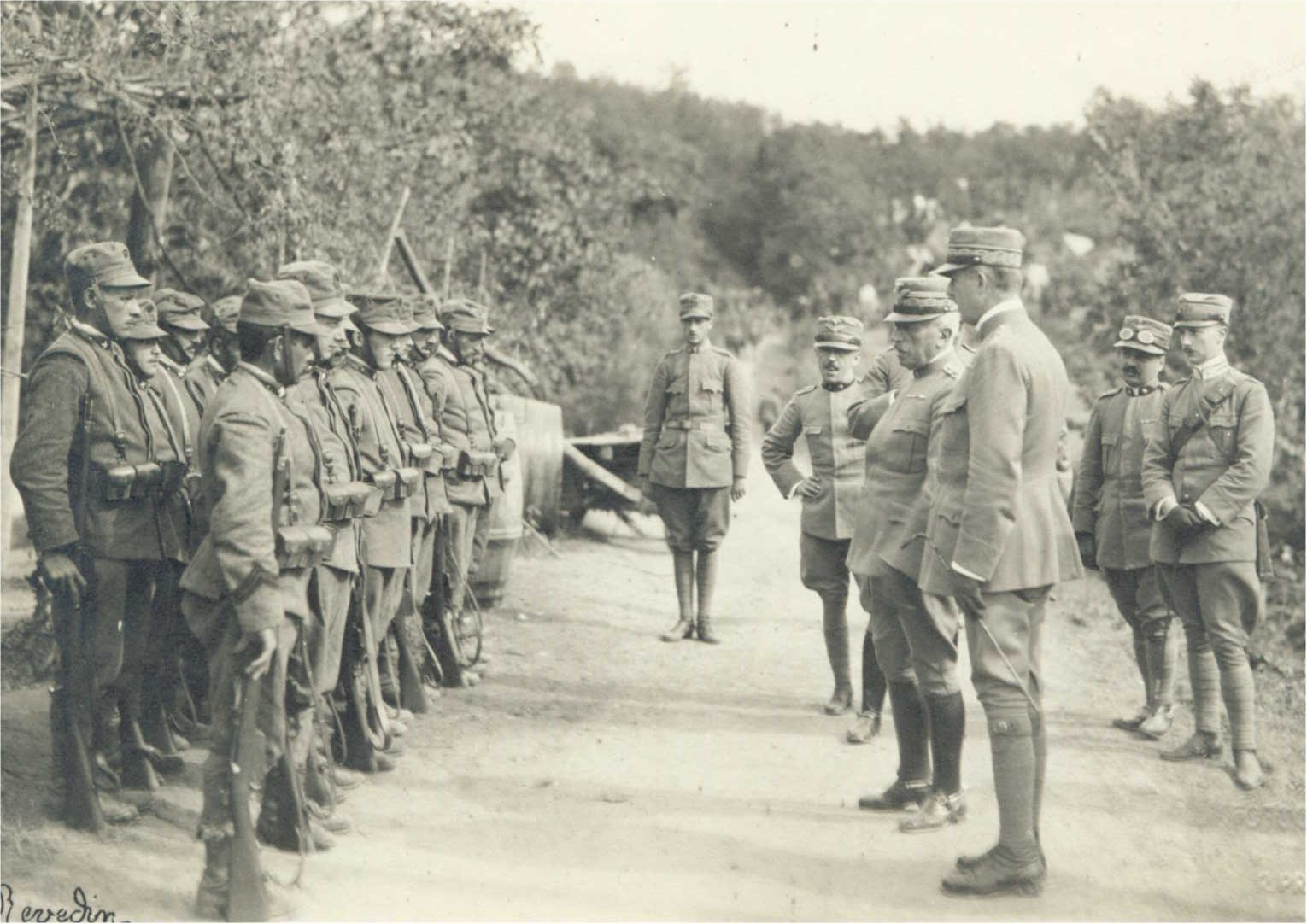
General Cadorna visiting Italian troops before the Second Battle of the Isonzo.

Cadorna inherited a difficult political and military situation. The government of Prime Minister Antonio Salandra favoured initial neutrality over Italy's treaty commitments under the Triple Alliance. Cadorna was accordingly obliged to reverse long-established strategic plans and discovered that the army was ill-prepared for war against Austria-Hungary and Germany. In particular, large numbers of men and quantities of equipment had been deployed to Tripolitania and so caused the home army to be disorganized.

The Italian government declared war on May 24, 1915. Hostilities began along the entire front. Cadorna's plan included an offensive on the Julian front (main action), defense in Trentino (secondary action), and other limited actions in the area of Cadore and Carnia. The advance began from Cadore to the sea with offensive intent and in Trentino to improve the border's defensive conditions. The terrain along the Italo-Austrian border (from Trentino to the Isonzo) was unsuited for offensive warfare by being mountainous and broken, with little room for manoeuvring.

In the first phase, from late May to late June, Italian troops occupied the southern part of the Trentino salient, the basins of Fiera di Primiero and Cortina d’Ampezzo, the border passes in Carnia, the Plezzo basin, and much of the right bank of the Isonzo; they also conquered Monte Nero (2245 mts), Monte Maggio, Monfalcone, Grado, Gradisca and created a bridghead at Plava.

Cadorna then ordered a series of operations on the Julian front, where Italy could attack with two armies (the 2nd and 3rd) and Austria defended with one (the 5th). Despite the numerical inferiority of their troops, the Austrians were in a strong defensive position because of the nature of trench warfare, their optimal artillery and machine guns, and the local terrain disadvantaging attackers. Cadorna opted to attack mainly in that direction since the remaining portions of the Italo-Austrian front were judged even more prohibitive. After the Italian occupation of Sagrado and some other minor positions, the First Battle of the Isonzo (from 23 June to 7 July) ended creating a stalemate, with high losses (dead, wounded or missing) on both sides: 14,917 Italians and 10,400 Austro-Hungarians.

Between July 24 and August 3, Italy's second Isonzo offensive took place. On the Karst, the Italian line advanced to the western slopes of Mount San Michele and east of Mount Nero. Italian troops made several tactical conquests and defended them from Austrian counter-attacks. The Italians gained Monte Rosso (2164 mts), Bosco Cappuccio and the nearby area, Castelnuovo, one of the two peaks (Hill 111) of mount Sei Busi, and the edge of the Doberdò plateau. The battle caused the two attacking Italian armies approximately 42,000 men dead, wounded, and missing; the 5th Austrian Army had over 47,000 casualties, losses that were judged "terrifying" by the Austrian generals in the aftermath of the battle. Cadorna ordered an operational pause to fill the ranks of the regiments with new reinforcements and wait for the arrival of field artillery.

The so-called Third and Fourth Battles on the Isonzo formed a single offensive from late October to early December, with a six-day pause between November 4 and 10. The Italians captured tactically relevant positions, such as Oslavia (Hill 188) and Mount Calvario (Hill 184); they expanded their occupation toward Tolmino, made progress on the San Michele, and Italian artilleries were able to begin the bombardment of Gorizia. In the two battles, Italy's two attacking armies (the 2nd and 3rd) suffered more losses than Austria's Isonzo army in absolute terms, but Austrian casualties remained worse in percentage. Cadorna, therefore, persisted in his strategy of attrition and commented "the current war can only end through the exhaustion of men and resources, and Austria is closer to reaching that point than we are. It is terrifying, but it is the way it is."

After a fifth and short-lived Italian attack on the Isonzo, the Austro-Hungarian Army launched the “punitive expedition” on the Asiago plateau, in mid-May 1916, to push the Italians back into the Venetian plain; this attack was followed by an Italian counter-offensive. Cadorna then ordered that forces exceeding defensive needs be transferred to the Isonzo front, planning to take the fortress of Gorizia, the capture of which would permit the Italian armies to pivot south and march on Trieste, or continue on to the Ljubljana Gap. To counter the new threat, the Austrians attacked at dawn on 29 June, on the Karst between San Michele and San Martino, deploying poison gas for the first time on the Italian front. The Sixth Battle of the Isonzo (6–17 August) led to the capture of Gorizia, the most significant success of Cadorna up to that point.

Three more smaller battles were fought on the Isonzo in 1916 (the seventh from 14 to 17 September, the eighth from 10 to 12 October, the ninth from 1 to 4 November). With the arrival of winter, operations ceased along almost the entire front from the Stelvio to the sea. The first months of 1917 were marked by severe weather, particularly in Carnia and Cadore, with heavy snowfall. Operational activity on both sides was limited to artillery duels and small raids to maintain offensive spirit. In spring, Cadorna ordered the resumption of fighting. His tenth offensive was fought from 12 to 28 May, during which the Italian army captured the Kuk-Vodice area. In August, Cadorna ordered the start of the Eleventh Battle, which allowed the Italian army to break through Austrian lines in the Bainsizza plateau and advance for 10-12 kms. About 6 million artillery shells were fired on the infantry of both armies, and more than 38% of Austrian guns were put out of action. Fearing that they would lose Trieste in case of another Italian offensive, the Austrians requested support from their German ally to launch a preemptive attack.

On 24 October 1917, a combined Austro-Hungarian/German army struck across the Isonzo at Kobarid (called Caporetto in Italian), and by 12 November, it had advanced all the way to the Piave River. Cadorna's disposition of most of his troops far forward, with little defence in depth, which contributed greatly to the Italian defeat at the Battle of Caporetto; a responsibility also lying with other officers such as Luigi Capello, commander of the 2nd Army, and Pietro Badoglio, who was the corps commander in a sector overrun by the Austro-German attack. Cadorna himself had been on leave for most of October, and his immediate subordinate was seriously ill.

The Italian Army retreated in disarray and seemed on the verge of total collapse; 275,000 soldiers were captured. On November 7, the Italian king and government dismissed Luigi Cadorna as Chief of Staff the Italian Army; Italy's allies Britain and France had also insisted on the dismissal of Cadorna and sent eleven divisions to reinforce the Italian front. However, those troops played no role in stemming the advancing Germans and Austro-Hungarians because they were deployed on the Mincio River, some 97 kilometres (60 mi) behind the Piave, as the British and French strategists did not believe the Piave line could be held.

The king appointed the respected General Armando Diaz as Chief of General Staff, with Badoglio named as his second-in-command. Cadorna was reassigned as the Italian representative to the Allied Supreme War Council set up in Versailles. The restored Italian defensive line was held during the first and second battles of the Piave, and later served as a springboard for the Battle of Vittorio Veneto, where the Austro-Hungarian army was finally defeated, after eleven days of resistance, by 51 Italian divisions, 3 British divisions, 2 French divisions, 1 Czechoslovak Division, and 1 U.S. Infantry Regiment. The Italians and their allies captured 426,000 enemy soldiers.

== Personal reputation ==
=== Post-war ===
After the war, the Italian government held an inquiry to investigate the defeat at Caporetto, published in 1919 and highly critical of Cadorna. Some even accused him of fleeing to Padua during the battle and of abandoning the entire Italian Second Army to its fate. Cadorna wrote his own memoirs in two volumes (La guerra alla fronte italiana) in which he defended his actions and decisions. His reputation improved in subsequent years, and he was made a Field Marshal (Maresciallo d'Italia) in 1924, two years after Benito Mussolini had seized power. Cadorna died in Bordighera in 1928.

=== Historiography ===
Opinions on Cadorna vary significantly. Some historians record Cadorna as an unimaginative martinet who was ruthless with his troops and dismissive of his country's political authorities. David Stevenson, Professor of International History at the London School of Economics, describes him as earning "opprobrium as one of the most callous and incompetent of First World War commanders." Cadorna's detractors criticize him for leading multiple and consecutive attacks, which caused a large number of casualties among his own men, while of being disproportionately bitter and ruthless. In manner, he appeared a reserved and aristocratic officer of the old-fashioned Piedmontese school.

During the course of the war, Cadorna dismissed 217 officers, and during the Battle of Caporetto, he ordered the summary execution of officers whose units retreated; 6% of Italian soldiers under his leadership faced a disciplinary charge during the war and 61% of those charged were found guilty. About 750 were executed, the highest number in any army in World War I. Claims have been made that he also reintroduced the ancient Roman practice of decimation, the killing of every tenth man, for units that failed to perform in battle. Those allegations alienated him from his troops.

However, the military historian John Keegan records that his "judicial savagery" took the form of the summary executions of individual stragglers, rather than the formalized winnowing of entire detachments. (Note: In May 1916, one specific instance of actual decimation occurred in the Italian Army, involving the execution of one in ten soldiers of a 120-strong company of the 141º Catanzaro Infantry Brigade that had mutinied and killed officers, carabinieri and other soldiers. Two days later, Cadorna endorsed the shooting of the 12 mutineers in a telegram sent to senior officers, but it is not clear whether he had been responsible for initiating the draconian measure.)

Other scholars and historians consider Cadorna a competent commander, who obtained several victories during his offensives despite the challenging conditions. Giorgio Rochat, although criticizing Cadorna for having "little concern for his soldiers," compares him to Joseph Joffre and Douglas Haig and writes that "trench warfare had its own terrible logic that was independent of Cadorna, as of other major commanders." He adds, "Cadorna had an unshakeable faith in his own mission and was not without a sense of vision." It is also claimed that Cadorna was effective in the field of military logistics. Several of his offensives were decided together with Allied commanders as part of an overall strategy to wear out Austro-German forces, and simultaneous battles were occurring in the Western and the Eastern Fronts. His reputation reached its height in 1916 after the recapture of Asiago and the occupation of Gorizia, with the rapid conquest of the Sabotino.

The disaster of Caporetto has been explained with the arrival of superior German forces to the Austrian front, which was believed to be about to collapse after the eleventh Isonzo offensive (battle of Bainsizza) in 1917. It was argued that the quasi-absolute power that he assumed over the Italian army and the harsh discipline that he imposed on his soldiers were largely derived from his own strong sense of duty.

== Family ==
He was the father of Raffaele Cadorna Jr., an Italian general who fought during World War I and World War II and was famous as one of the commanders of the Italian resistance against the German forces occupying northern Italy after 1943.

== See also ==
- World War I
- Italian campaign (World War I)
