= Pietro Frugoni =

Italian general (1851–1940)

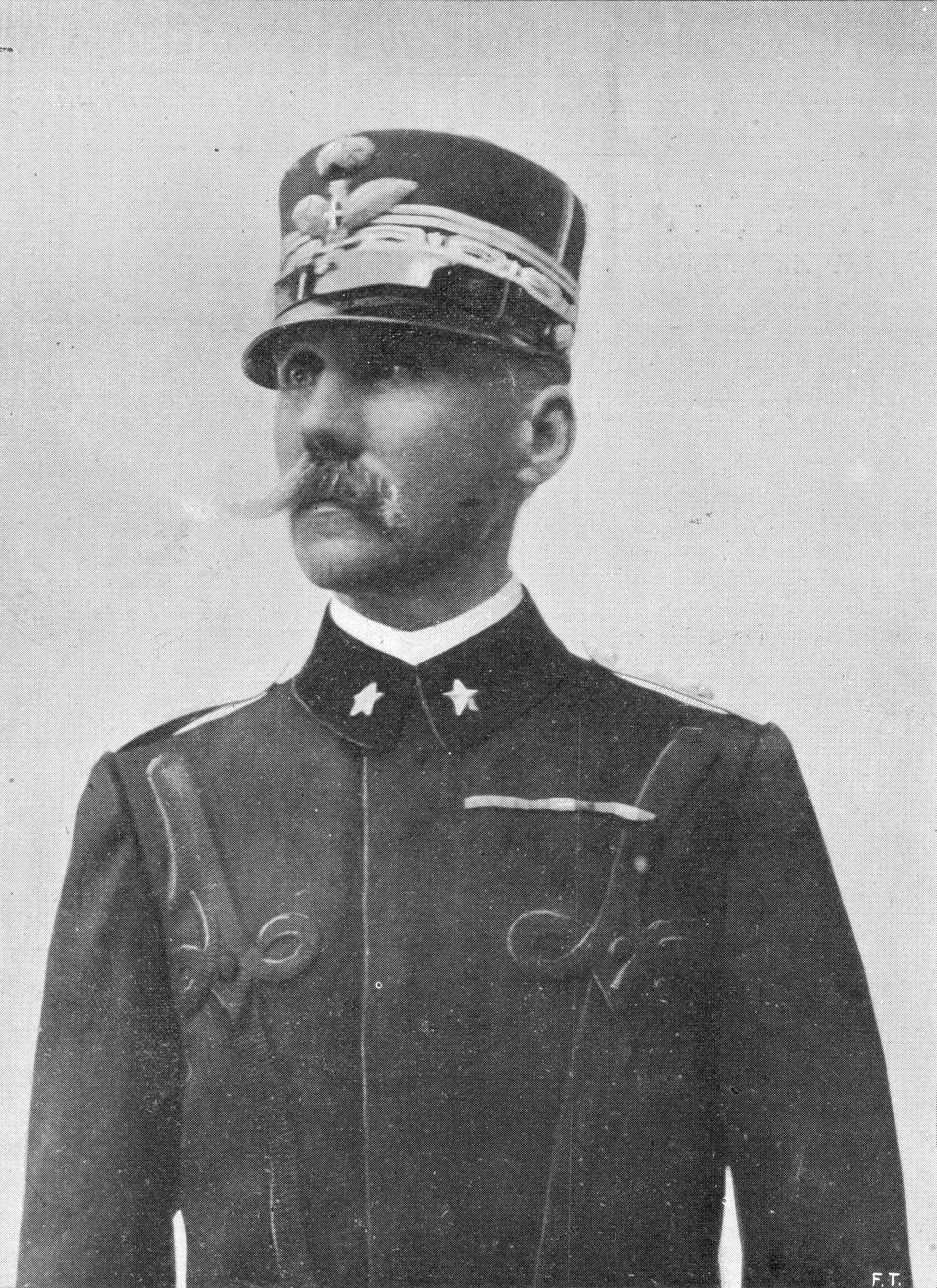
Pietro Frugoni

Pietro Frugoni (Brescia, 21 January 1851 – Brescia, 10 July 1940) was an Italian general of the Kingdom of Italy who actively participated in World War I, especially in the first four Battles of the Isonzo.

Appointed lieutenant general in 1906, he commanded the I Special Corps in Tripoli during the Italian-Turkish War. In September 1912 he won the Battle of Zanzur, but was later recalled to Italy.

When Italy entered World War I in May 1915, he commanded the Second Army during the first four Battles of the Isonzo (June 1915 – December 1915). When the Austro-Hungarian Army launched the surprise Trentino Offensive in May 1916, Frugoni was appointed commander of the newly established Fifth Army to stop their advance. In mid-June 1916, General Luigi Cadorna dismissed him.

He went into the reserve and was not recalled by Cadorna's successor, Armando Diaz. Many of his former subordinates, like General Ezio Reisoli, were critical of him in their memoirs.
