= Military history of Italy during World War I =

Although Italy was a member of the Triple Alliance, it did not join Germany and Austria-Hungary when the conflict started in 1914, arguing that the war had been initiated by the two Central Powers and that the Triple Alliance was a defensive pact. Italians protested against the lack of consultation before Austria issued the ultimatum to Serbia and invoked a clause which recognized that both Italy and Austria-Hungary had interests in the Balkans and required either power to compensate the other if it altered the status quo in the region. As compensation, Italy asked for the prompt transfer of the Italian-speaking lands of Trento and Trieste; Austria-Hungary refused to cede Trieste and promised to transfer Trento only upon the conclusion of the war. In May 1915, after secret parallel negotiations with both sides, the Italians entered the war as one of the Allied Powers, hoping to acquire Trento and Trieste (known in Italian discourse as the "unredeemed lands", with the conflict being described as the "fourth war of independence" against Austria) and other territories (German-speaking South Tyrol, the largely Slavic-speaking regions of Istria and Dalmatia where Italians lived in coastal cities, some colonial compensations) promised them by the allies in the 1915 treaty of London.

Italy opened a front against Austria-Hungary along the Eastern Alps and the Isonzo river. Fighting was marked by trench warfare and attrition. On the Julian sector, the Italian army launched numerous offensives and made several conquests (most significantly Gorizia in 1916 and Bainsizza in 1917), but both sides suffered heavy casualties. On the Asiago plateau, in 1916, an Austrian offensive was followed by an Italian counter-offensive. Italy was forced to retreat in 1917 by a German-Austrian offensive at the Battle of Caporetto, when the Central Powers were able to move reinforcements to the Italian Front from the Eastern Front.

Further offensives by the Central Powers were stopped by Italy at Monte Grappa in November-December 1917 and on the Piave River in June-July 1918. On 24 October 1918, the anniversary of Caporetto, Italy launched the battle of Vittorio Veneto: Italian troops achieved a breakthrough, recovered the territory previously lost, and moved into Trento and Trieste by the time fighting ended on November 4 (a date celebrated as National Unity Day in Italy). The centuries-old Habsburg Empire collapsed. Italian armed forces were also involved in the Western Front (taking part in the Second Battle of the Marne, around Bligny, and in the subsequent Hundred Days Offensive), the African theatre, the Balkan theatre and the Middle Eastern theatre.

At the end of World War I, in the Paris Peace Conference of 1919, Italy was recognized a permanent seat in the League of Nations' executive council and the possession of many promised territories: Trento and Trieste, whose annexation completed national unification, South Tyrol, Istria and some colonial compensations. Territories in Dalmatia (although also included in the 1915 treaty of London) and the town of Fiume (despite a sizeable Italian population) were not assigned to Italy as they were claimed by Yugoslavia; a part of Italian nationalists (the followers of Gabriele D'Annunzio) accused the Allies of "mutilating" the Italian victory and occupied Fiume without royal assent. The quarrel between Italy and Yugoslavia would be solved by the treaty of Rapallo (1920), with Italy annexing the Dalmatian capital of Zara and Fiume becoming a free State. The post-war period saw increasing political violence, eventually leading to the establishment of Mussolini's Fascist government in 1922.

== From neutrality to intervention ==
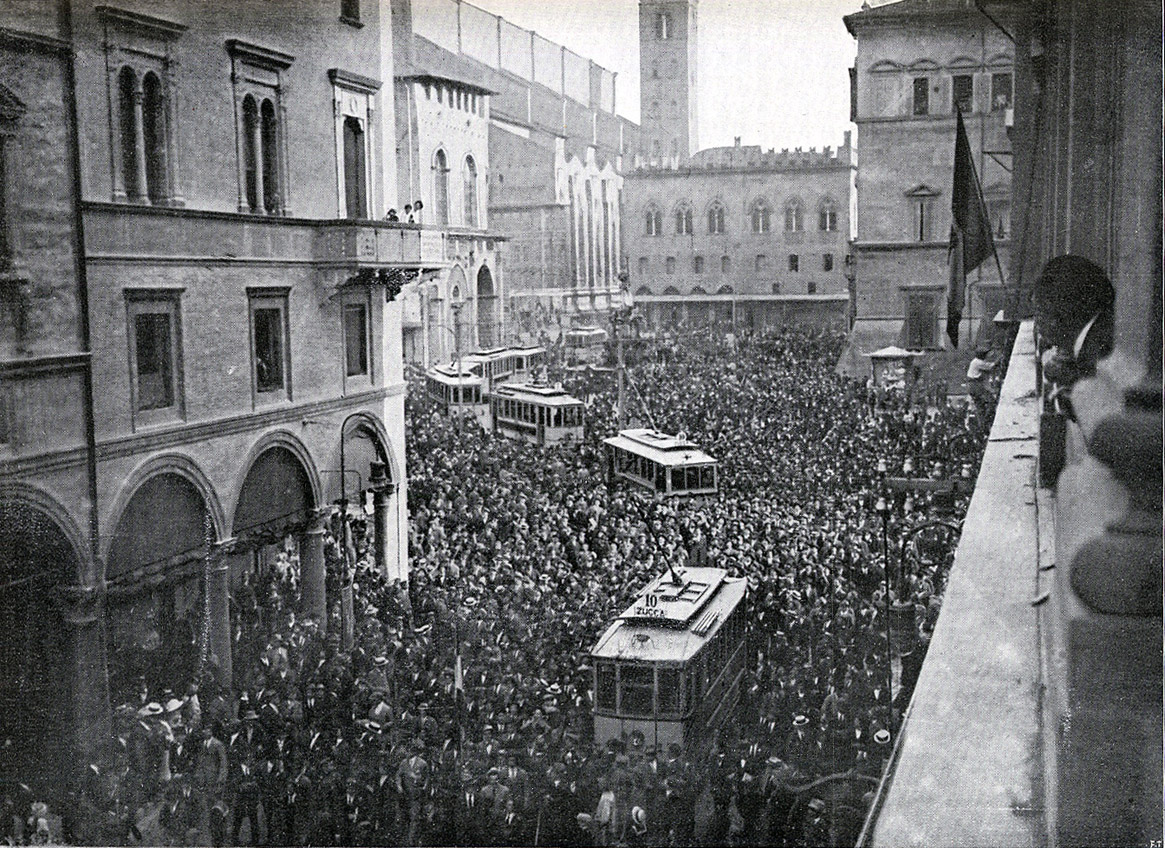
A pro-war demonstration in Bologna, 1914

Italy was a member of the Triple Alliance with Germany and Austria-Hungary. Despite this, in the years before the war, Italy had enhanced its diplomatic relationships with the United Kingdom and France. This was because the Italian government had grown convinced that support of Austria (the traditional enemy of Italy during the 19th century Risorgimento) would not gain Italy the territories it wanted: Trieste, Istria, Zara and Dalmatia, all Austrian possessions. In fact, a secret agreement signed with France in 1902 sharply conflicted with Italy's membership in the Triple Alliance.

A few days after the outbreak of the war, on 3 August 1914, the government, led by the conservative Antonio Salandra, declared that Italy would not commit its troops, maintaining that the Triple Alliance had only a defensive stance and Austria-Hungary had been the aggressor. Thereafter Salandra and the minister of Foreign Affairs, Sidney Sonnino, began to probe which side would grant the best reward for Italy's entrance in the war or its neutrality. Although the majority of the cabinet (including former Prime Minister Giovanni Giolitti) was firmly against intervention, numerous intellectuals, including Socialists such as Ivanoe Bonomi, Leonida Bissolati, and, after 18 October 1914, Benito Mussolini, declared in favour of intervention, which was then mostly supported by the Nationalist and the Liberal parties. Pro-interventionist socialists believed that, once that weapons had been distributed to the people, they could have transformed the war into a revolution. Italy's neutrality also favored Spain's neutrality.

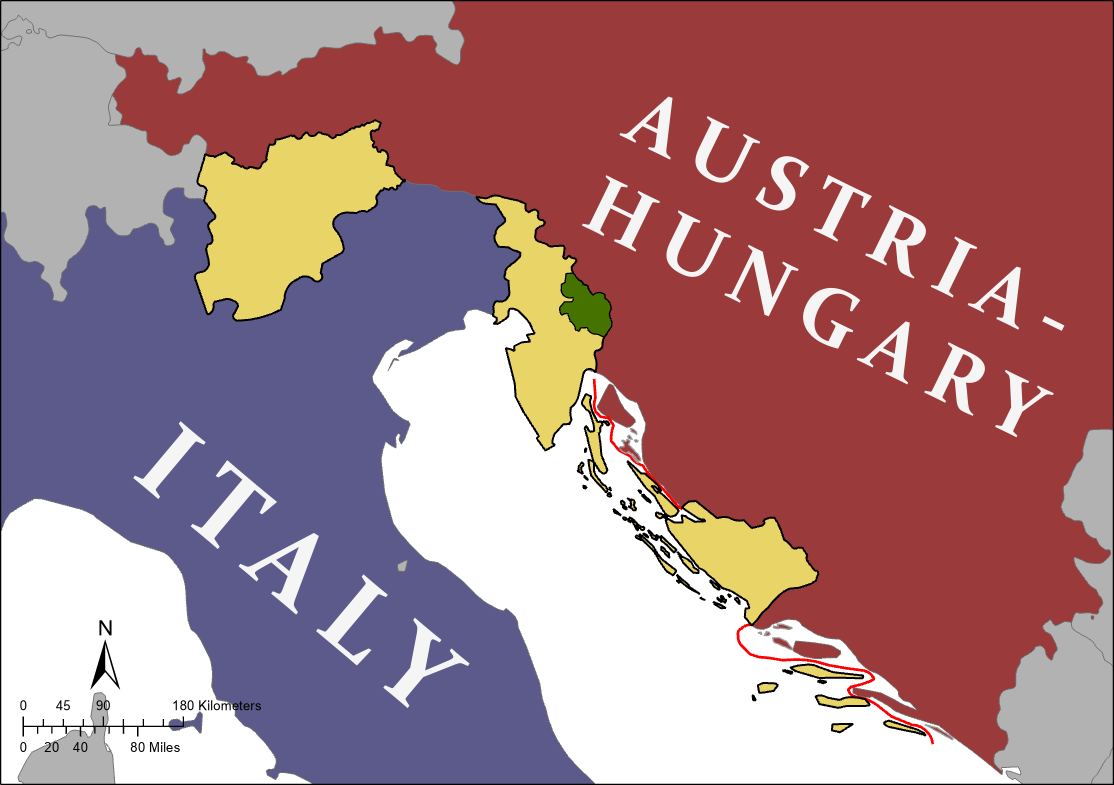
Territories promised to Italy by the Treaty of London (1915), i.e. Trentino-Alto Adige, the Julian March and Dalmatia (tan), and the Snežnik Plateau area (green). Dalmatia, after WWI, however, was not assigned to Italy but to Yugoslavia.

The negotiation with Central Powers to keep Italy neutral failed: after victory Italy was to get Trentino but not South Tyrol, part of the Austrian Littoral but not Trieste, maybe Tunisia but only after the end of the war while Italy wanted them immediately. The negotiation with the Allies led to the London Pact (26 April 1915), signed by Sonnino without the approval of the Italian Parliament. According to the Pact, after victory Italy was to get Trentino and the South Tyrol up to the Brenner Pass, the entire Austrian Littoral (with Trieste), Gorizia and Gradisca (Eastern Friuli) and Istria (but without Fiume), parts of western Carniola (Idrija and Ilirska Bistrica) and north-western Dalmatia with Zara and most of the islands, but without Split. Other agreements concerned the sovereignty of the port of Valona, the province of Antalya in Turkey and part of the German colonies in Africa.

On 3 May 1915 Italy officially revoked the Triple Alliance. In the following days Giolitti and the neutralist majority of the Parliament opposed declaring war, while nationalist crowds demonstrated in public areas for it. (The nationalist poet Gabriele D'Annunzio called this period le radiose giornate di Maggio—"the sunny days of May"; also called the Radiosomaggismo.) Giolitti had the support of the majority of Italian parliament so on 13 May Salandra offered his resignation to King Victor Emmanuel III, but then Giolitti learned that the London Pact was already signed: fearful of a conflict between the Crown and the Parliament and the consequences on both internal stability and foreign relationships, Giolitti accepted the fait accompli, declined to succeed as prime minister and Salandra's resignation was not accepted. On 23 May, Italy declared war on Austria-Hungary. This was followed by declarations of war on the Ottoman Empire (21 August 1915, following an ultimatum of 3 August), Bulgaria (19 October 1915) and the German Empire (28 August 1916).

Italy entered into World War I also with the aim of completing national unity with the annexation of Trentino-Alto Adige and Julian March: for this reason, the Italian intervention in the First World War is also considered the Fourth Italian War of Independence, in a historiographical perspective that identifies in the latter the conclusion of the unification of Italy, whose military actions began during the revolutions of 1848 with the First Italian War of Independence.

== Italian Front ==
=== Topography ===
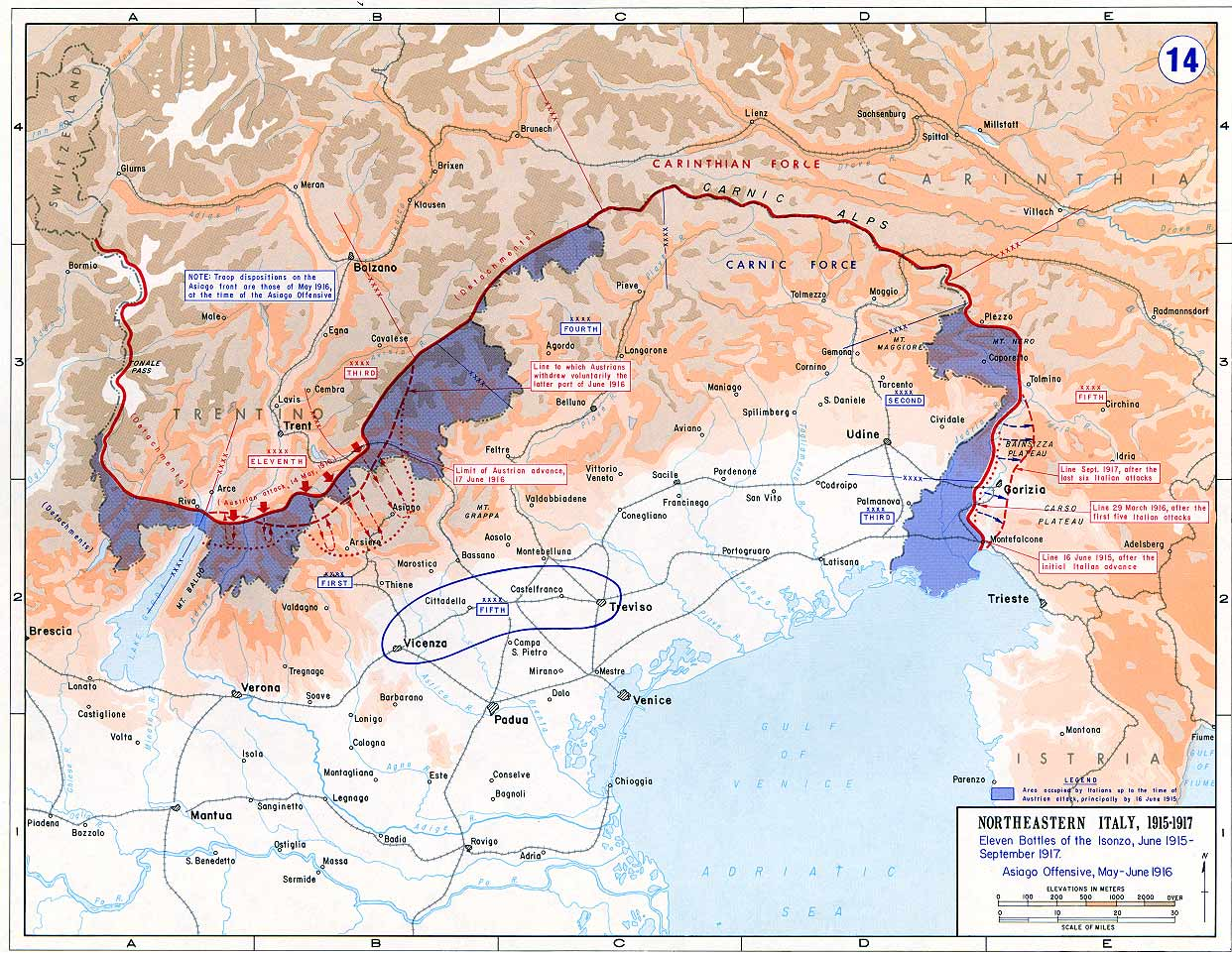
The Italian front in 1915–1917: eleven Battles of the Isonzo and Asiago offensive. In blue, initial Italian conquests.

The Italian Front stretched from the Stelvio Pass (at the border triangle between Italy, Austria-Hungary and Switzerland) along the Tyrolean, Carinthian, and Littoral borders to the Isonzo. Its total length was around 650 km (400 mi), of which 400 km (250 mi) ran in high alpine terrain. This information relates to measurements as the crow flies. Taking into account the natural terrain, the many yokes, peaks and ridges with the resulting differences in height, the effective length was several thousand kilometers.

The front touched very different geographical areas: in the first three sections - from the Stelvio Pass to the Julian Alps in the area of Tarvisio, it ran through mountainous territory, where the average ridge heights reached 2,700 to 3,200 meters. The higher mountainous regions have a highly rugged relief with little vegetation; Elevations over 2,500 meters are also covered by glaciers. The barren landscape and lack of sufficient arable land led to little development of these high elevations; settlement was largely limited to the lower-lying zones. From the Julian Alps to the Adriatic Sea, the mountains are constantly losing on height and only rarely reach 1,000 meters as in the area around Gorizia. This area is also sparsely populated and characterized by a harsh climate with cold winters and very hot and dry summers. A craggy karst landscape spreads out around the Isonzo valley, which adjoins the Italian foothills of the Alps in the southwest.

The topographical characteristics of the front area had a concrete impact on the conduct of the war. The rocky ground, for example, made it difficult to dig trenches and in addition, the karst rock in the Isonzo Valley turned out to be an additional danger for the soldiers. If grenades exploded on the porous surface fragments of the exploding rock acted as additional shrapnel.

=== Mobilization ===
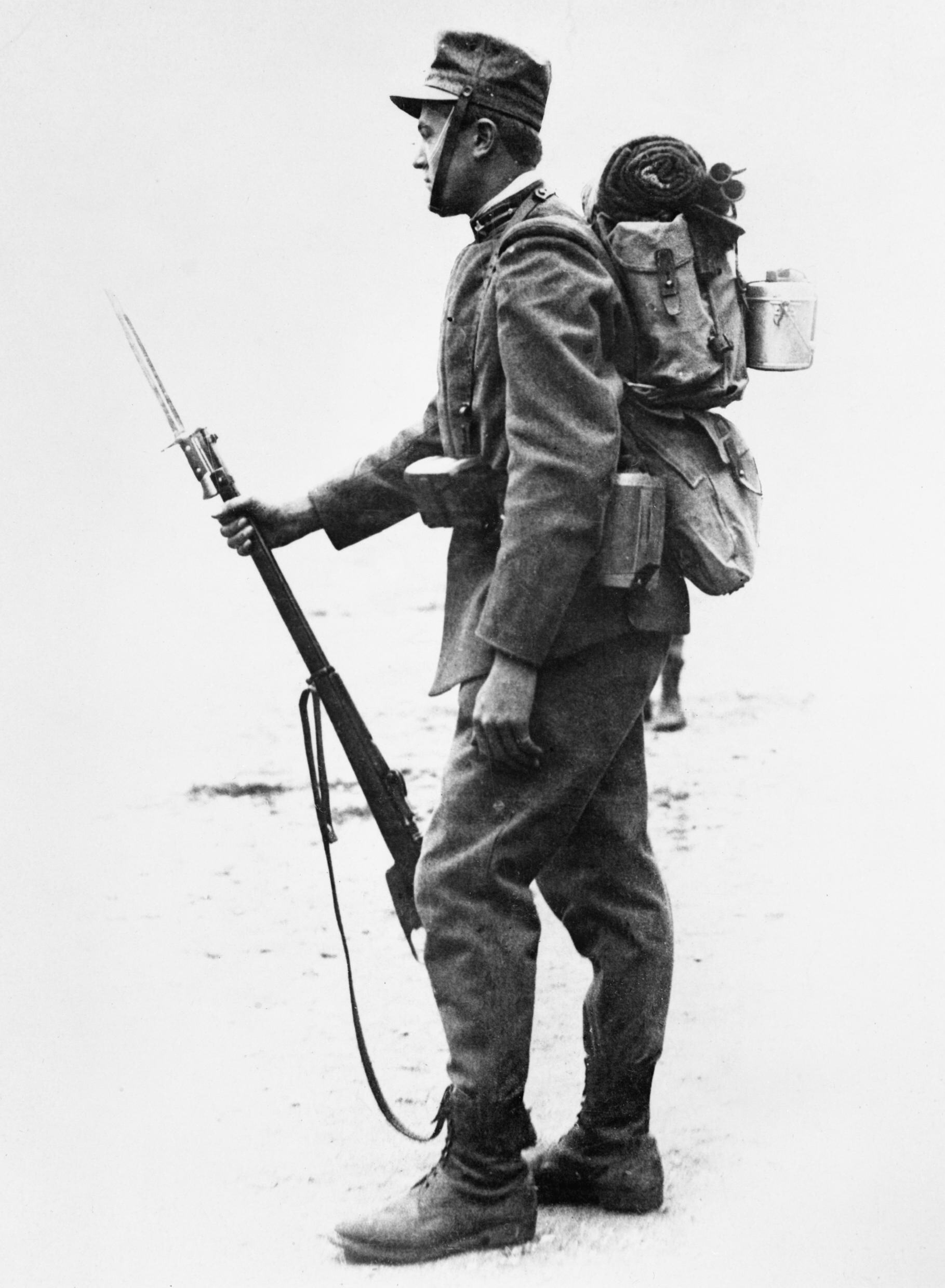
Italian infantry soldier in full marching order

Archduke Eugen, who was already in command of the Balkan forces, was promoted to Generaloberst on May 22, 1915 and was given supreme command of the new southwest front. Together with his chief of staff Alfred Krauß the 5th Army was reorganized and placed under the command of General d. Inf. Svetozar Boroević who on May 27 had arrived from the Eastern Front. The K. u. k. Landesverteidigungskommando in Tyrol (LVK) was handed to GdK Viktor Dankl to protect the Tyrolean borders. It included the German Alpenkorps which was suitable for operations in the high mountains, the first divisions arrived on May 26; a short time later, the Alpenkorps was already taking part in combat operations against Italian units, although the German Empire was not officially at war with Italy until August 28, 1916. The "Armeegruppe Rohr" stood under the command of Franz Rohr von Denta and was to secure the Carinthian front. The transfer of the 5th Army and additional troops from the east went smoothly; within a few weeks, Archduke Eugen had around 225,000 soldiers under his command. In June the 48. Division (FML Theodor Gabriel) and finally, in July, the four Kaiserjäger regiments and three k.k. Landesschützen regiments from Galicia were added. A major advantage of the Austro-Hungarian defense was its entrenchment on higher ground.

Italy ordered general mobilization on May 22, 1915 and by the end of June four armies had marched into the north-east border area. In the deployment plan of the Italian general staff (Commando Supremo) under the direction of FM Luigi Cadorna, three main points were set:

- The 1st Army was to encircle the Tyrolean front from the west and south.
- The 4th Army was to set up position in the Cadore and Carnia
- The 2nd and 3rd Armies, on the other hand, were opposed to the 5th k.u.k. Army, in the Julian Alps and on the Isonzo.

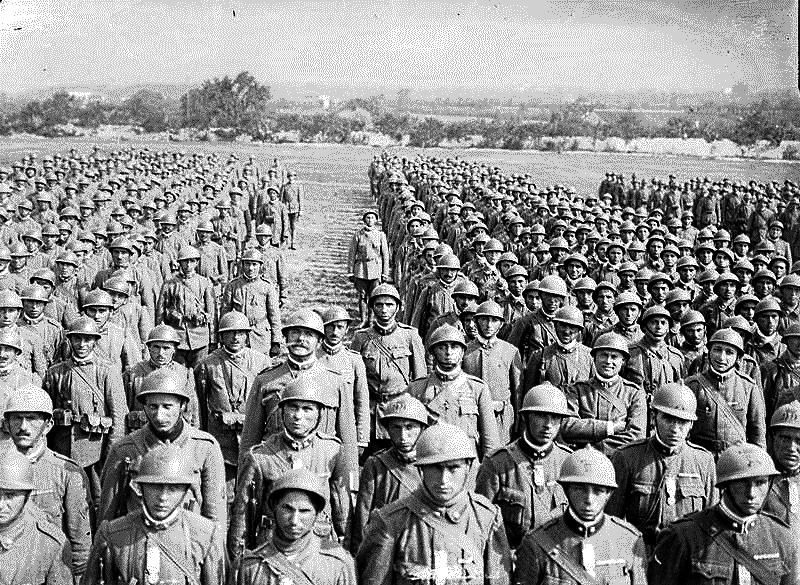
Italian soldiers listening to their general's speech

Although the Italian armed forces were numerically superior, things initially remained surprisingly quiet on the southwestern front. No attempt was made to break through on the Tyrolean front, and there was no major offensive on the Isonzo either. Due to the hesitant implementation of Cadorna's attack plans, the chance to score the decisive blow right at the beginning was lost. FML Cletus Pichler, the chief of staff of the LVK Tirol, wrote:

A general attack on the most important penetration points, such as the Stilfser Joch, Etschtal, Valsugana, Rollepass [sic], [and] Kreuzbergpass, [...] could have led to significant enemy successes in view of the extremely weak defense forces in May.

That the opportunity for a quick breakthrough was not used was partly due to the slow mobilization of the Italian army. Due to the poorly developed transport network, the provision of troops and war material could only be completed in mid-June, i.e. a month later than estimated by the military leadership. The Italian army also suffered from many shortcomings on the structural level. Artillery pieces and munitions were not the only area where shortages were acute. In August 1914 the Italian army had at its disposal only 750,000 rifles of the standard Carcano 1891 model and no hand grenades available at all. This inadequate supply of equipment especially limited the scope and efficiency of training throughout 1914 and 1915. Munitions were also urgently needed: in July 1914 only ca. 700 rounds were available per rifle, despite Cadorna's demand that 2,000 rounds each be found in preparation for war, by May 1915 the army had only succeeded in procuring 900 rounds per rifle. Meanwhile, Emilio De Bono records that "throughout 1915 hand-grenades remained unheard of in the trenches".

Italy's first machine guns were prototypes, as the Perino Model 1908, or Maxim guns acquired in 1913 from the British manufacturer Vickers. In line with the 1911 plan for creating 602 machine gun sections. By August 1914 only 150 of these had been created, meaning there was only one machine gun section per regiment, as opposed to one per battalion, as envisaged in the plans. By May 1915 the Fiat-Revelli Mod. 1914 became the standard machine gun of the Italian army and a total of 309 sections had been created, with 618 guns in total; though this was an improvement it was still only half the planned number, leaving many battalions to do without. In contrast a standard k.u.k regiment had four machine gun sections, MG 07/12 "Schwarzlose", one for each battalion, whilst a standard British regiment had by February 1915 four machine gun sections per battalion.

During the Italo-Turkish War in Libya (1911–1912), the Italian military suffered equipment and munition shortages not yet repaired before Italian entry into the Great War. The main Italian effort was to be concentrated in the Isonzo and Vipava valleys and on the Karst Plateau, in the direction of Ljubljana. The Italian troops had some initial successes, but as in the Western Front, the campaign soon evolved into trench warfare. Trenches had to be dug also in the Alpine rocks and glaciers instead of in the mud, and often up to 3,000 m (9,800 ft) of altitude.

=== Operations of 1915 ===
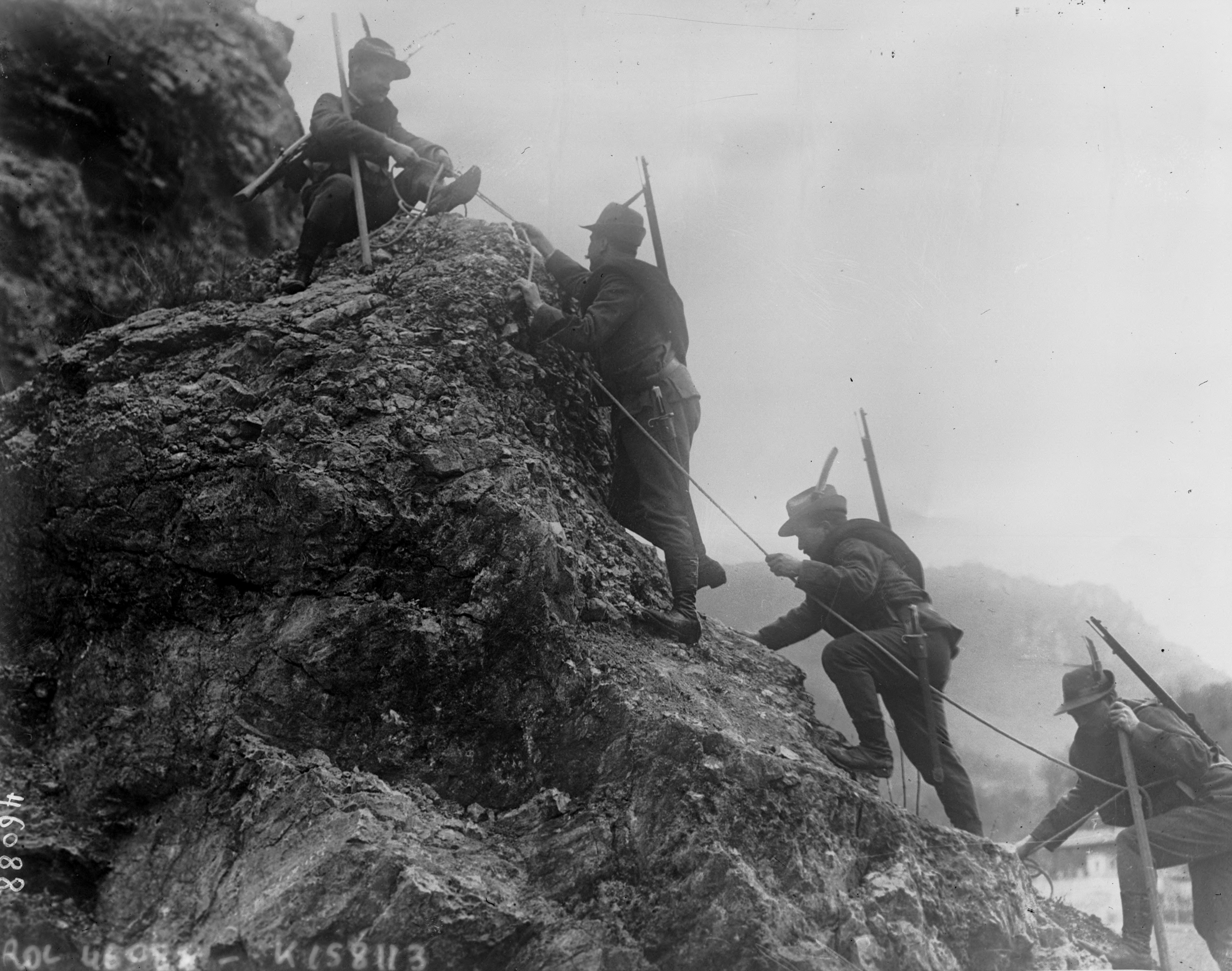
Italian Alpini troops, 1915

The Italian government declared war on May 24, 1915. Hostilities began along the entire front. The first shells were fired in the dawn of 24 May 1915 against the enemy positions of Cervignano del Friuli, which was captured a few hours later. On the same day the Austro-Hungarian fleet bombarded the railway stations of Manfredonia and Ancona. The first Italian casualty was Riccardo Di Giusto. Cadorna's plan included an offensive on the Julian front (main action), defense in Trentino (secondary action), and other limited actions in the area of Cadore and Carnia. The advance began from Cadore to the sea with offensive intent and in Trentino to improve the border's defensive conditions. The terrain along the Italo-Austrian border (from Trentino to the Isonzo) was unsuited for offensive warfare by being mountainous and broken, with little room for manoeuvring.

In the first phase, from late May to late June, Italian troops occupied the southern part of the Trentino salient, the basins of Fiera di Primiero and Cortina d'Ampezzo, the border passes in Carnia, the Plezzo basin, and much of the right bank of the Isonzo; they also conquered Monte Nero (2245 mts), Monte Maggio, Monfalcone, Grado, Gradisca and created a bridghead at Plava.

Cadorna then ordered a series of operations on the Julian front, where Italy could attack with two armies (the 2nd and 3rd) and Austria defended with one (the 5th). Despite the numerical inferiority of their troops, the Austrians were in a strong defensive position because of the nature of trench warfare, their optimal artillery and machine guns, and the local terrain disadvantaging attackers. Cadorna opted to attack mainly in that direction since the remaining portions of the Italo-Austrian front were judged even more prohibitive. After the Italian occupation of Sagrado and some other minor positions, the First Battle of the Isonzo (from 23 June to 7 July) ended creating a stalemate, with high losses (dead, wounded or missing) on both sides: 14,917 Italians and 10,400 Austro-Hungarians.

Between July 24 and August 3, Italy's second Isonzo offensive took place. On the Karst, the Italian line advanced to the western slopes of Mount San Michele and east of Mount Nero. Italian troops made several tactical conquests and defended them from Austrian counter-attacks. The Italians gained Monte Rosso (2164 mts), Bosco Cappuccio and the nearby area, Castelnuovo, one of the two peaks (Hill 111) of mount Sei Busi, and the edge of the Doberdò plateau. The battle caused the two attacking Italian armies approximately 42,000 men dead, wounded, and missing; the 5th Austrian Army had over 47,000 casualties, losses that were judged "terrifying" by the Austrian generals in the aftermath of the battle. Cadorna ordered an operational pause to fill the ranks of the regiments with new reinforcements and wait for the arrival of field artillery.

The so-called Third and Fourth Battles on the Isonzo formed a single offensive from late October to early December, with a six-day pause between November 4 and 10. The Italians captured tactically relevant positions, such as Oslavia (Hill 188) and Mount Calvario (Hill 184); they expanded their occupation toward Tolmino, made progress on the San Michele, and Italian artilleries were able to begin the bombardment of Gorizia. In the two battles, Italy's two attacking armies (the 2nd and 3rd) suffered more losses than Austria's Isonzo army in absolute terms, but Austrian casualties remained worse in percentage of the forces employed. Cadorna, therefore, persisted in his strategy of attrition and commented "the current war can only end through the exhaustion of men and resources, and Austria is closer to reaching that point than we are. It is terrifying, but it is the way it is."

=== Italian offensives of 1916–1917 ===
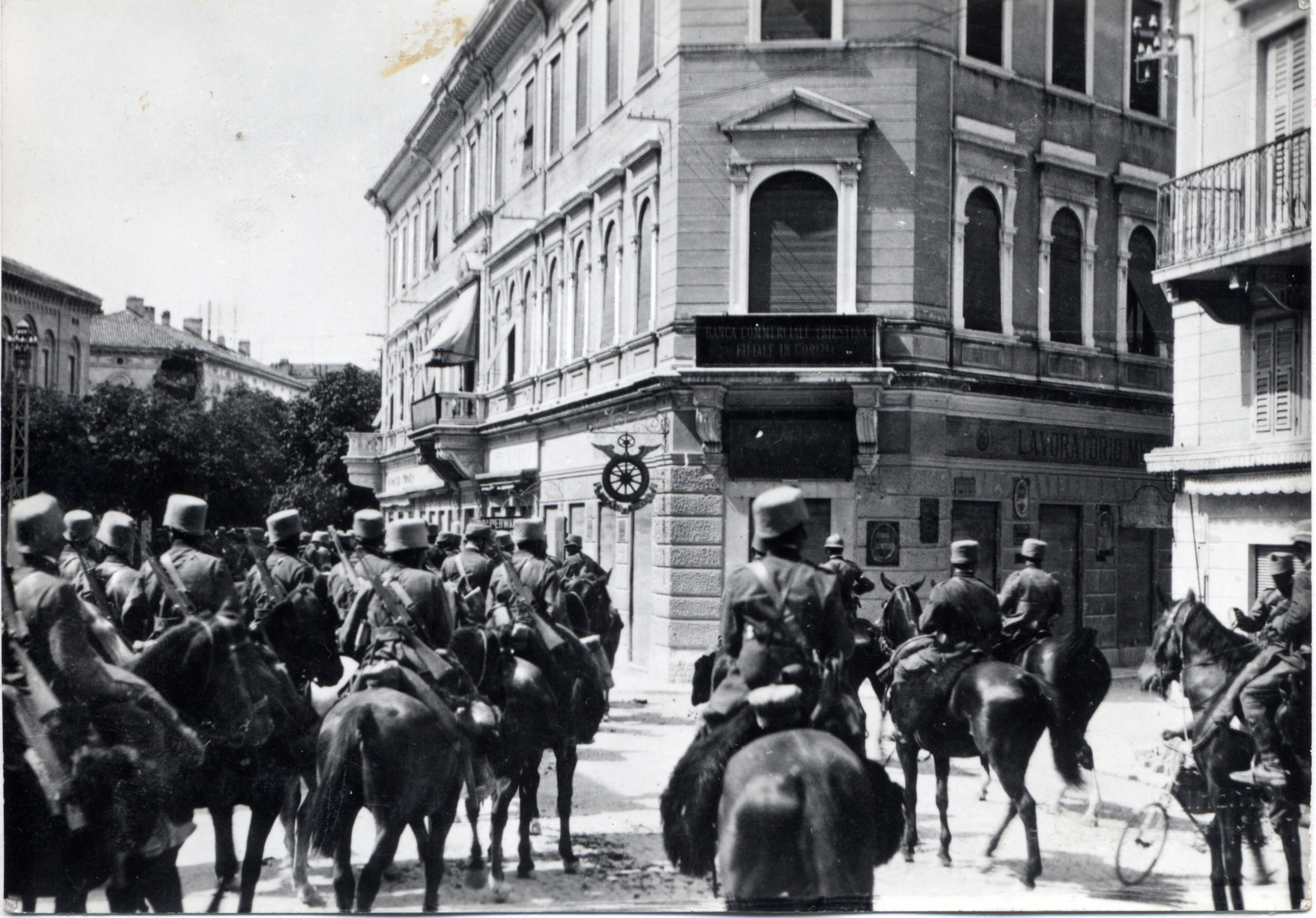
Italian cavalry entering Gorizia after the Sixth Battle of the Isonzo

After a fifth and short-lived Italian attack on the Isonzo, the Austro-Hungarian forces began planning a counteroffensive (Battle of Asiago) in Trentino and directed over the plateau of Altopiano di Asiago, with the aim to break through to the Po River plain and thus cutting off the 2nd, 3rd, and 4th Italian Armies in the North East of the country. The offensive began on 15 May 1916 with 15 divisions, and resulted in initial gains, but then the Italians counterattacked and pushed the Austro-Hungarians back to the Tyrol. Cadorna then ordered that forces exceeding defensive needs be transferred to the Isonzo front, planning to take the fortress of Gorizia, the capture of which would permit the Italian armies to pivot south and march on Trieste, or continue on to the Ljubljana Gap. To counter the new threat, the Austrians attacked at dawn on 29 June, on the Karst between San Michele and San Martino, deploying poison gas for the first time on the Italian front. The Sixth Battle of the Isonzo (6–17 August) led to the capture of Gorizia, the most significant Italian success up to that point. Three more smaller battles were fought on the Isonzo in 1916 (the seventh from 14 to 17 September, the eighth from 10 to 12 October, the ninth from 1 to 4 November). With the arrival of winter, operations ceased along almost the entire front from the Stelvio to the sea.

In late 1916, the Italian army advanced for some kilometers in Trentino, while, for the whole winter of 1916–1917, the situation in the Isonzo front remained stationary.

The first months of 1917 were marked by severe weather, particularly in Carnia and Cadore, with heavy snowfall. Operational activity on both sides was limited to artillery duels and small raids to maintain offensive spirit. In spring, Cadorna ordered the resumption of fighting. The Tenth Battle of the Isonzo was fought from 12 to 28 May, during which the Italian army captured the Kuk-Vodice area. In August, Cadorna ordered the start of the Eleventh Battle, which allowed the Italian army to break through Austrian lines in the Bainsizza plateau and advance for 10-12 kms. About 6 million artillery shells were fired on the infantry of both armies, and more than 38% of Austrian guns were put out of action. Fearing that they would lose Trieste in case of another Italian offensive, the Austrians requested support from their German ally to launch a preemptive attack. On 25 August, the Emperor Charles wrote to the Kaiser the following: "The experience we have acquired in the eleventh battle has led me to believe that we should fare far worse in the twelfth. My commanders and brave troops have decided that such an unfortunate situation might be anticipated by an offensive. We have not the necessary means as regards troops."

=== Tunnel warfare in the mountains ===
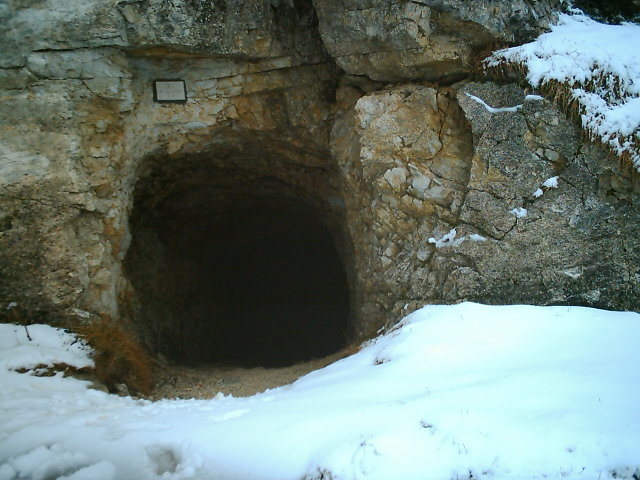
A mine gallery in the ice at Pasubio

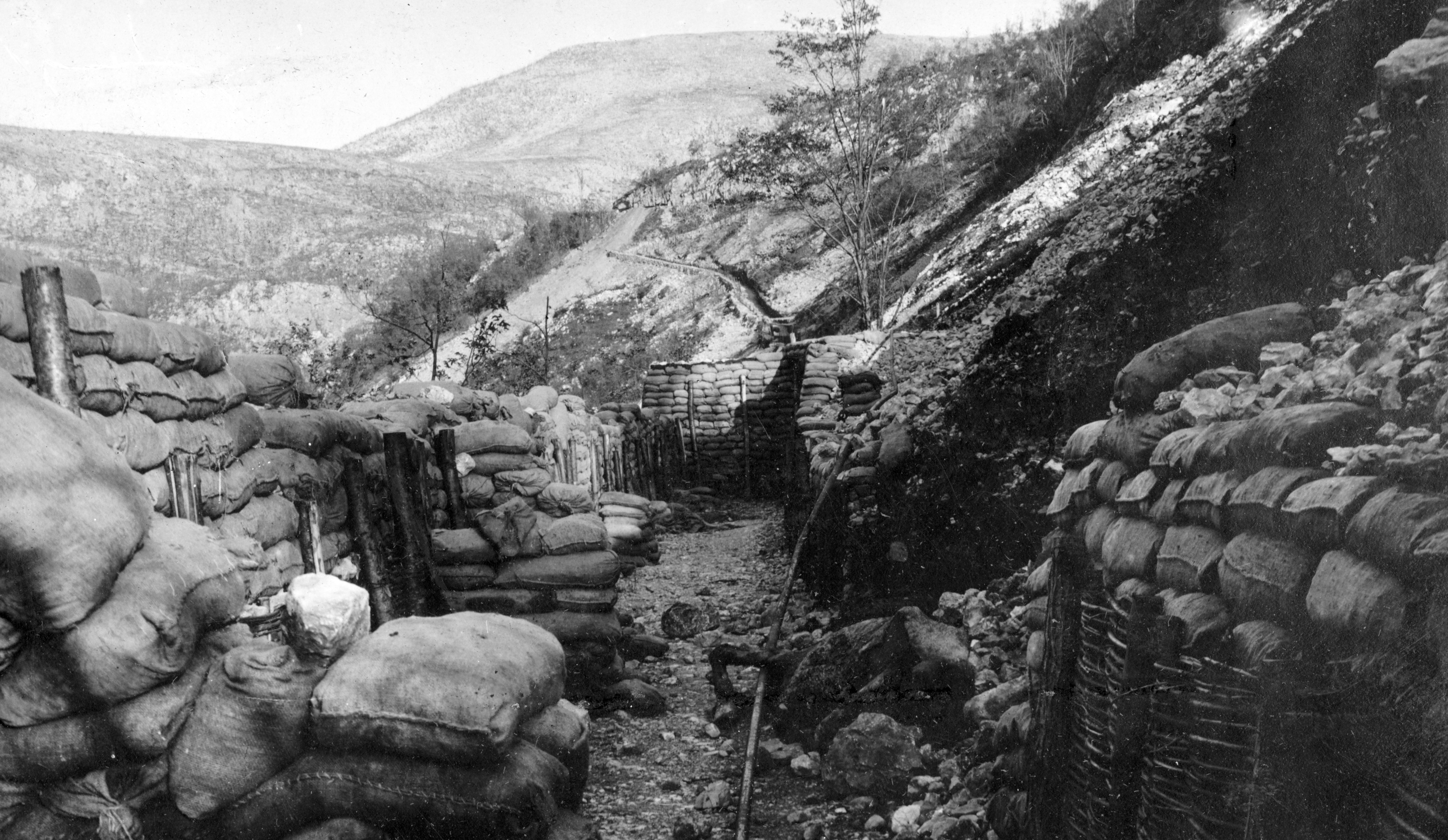
Trenches at the mountain Škabrijel in 1917

From 1915, the high peaks of the Dolomites range were an area of fierce mountain warfare. In order to protect their soldiers from enemy fire and the hostile alpine environment, both Austro-Hungarian and Italian military engineers constructed fighting tunnels which offered a degree of cover and allowed better logistics support. Working at high altitudes in the hard carbonate rock of the Dolomites, often in exposed areas near mountain peaks and even in glacial ice, required extreme skill of both Austro-Hungarian and Italian miners.

Beginning on the 13th, later referred to as White Friday, December 1916 would see 10,000 soldiers on both sides killed by avalanches in the Dolomites. Numerous avalanches were caused by the Italians and Austro-Hungarians purposefully firing artillery shells on the mountainside, while others were naturally caused.

In addition to building underground shelters and covered supply routes for their soldiers like the Italian Strada delle 52 Gallerie, both sides also attempted to break the stalemate of trench warfare by tunneling under no man's land and placing explosive charges beneath the enemy's positions. Between 1 January 1916 and 13 March 1918, Austro-Hungarian and Italian units fired a total of 34 mines in this theatre of the war. Focal points of the underground fighting were Pasubio with 10 mines, Lagazuoi with 5, Col di Lana/Monte Sief also with 5, and Marmolada with 4 mines. The explosive charges ranged from 110 to 50,000 kilograms (240–110,230 pounds) of blasting gelatin. In April 1916, the Italians detonated explosives under the peaks of Col Di Lana, killing numerous Austro-Hungarians.

=== Late 1917 ===
==== German intervention on the Isonzo; the Battle of Caporetto ====
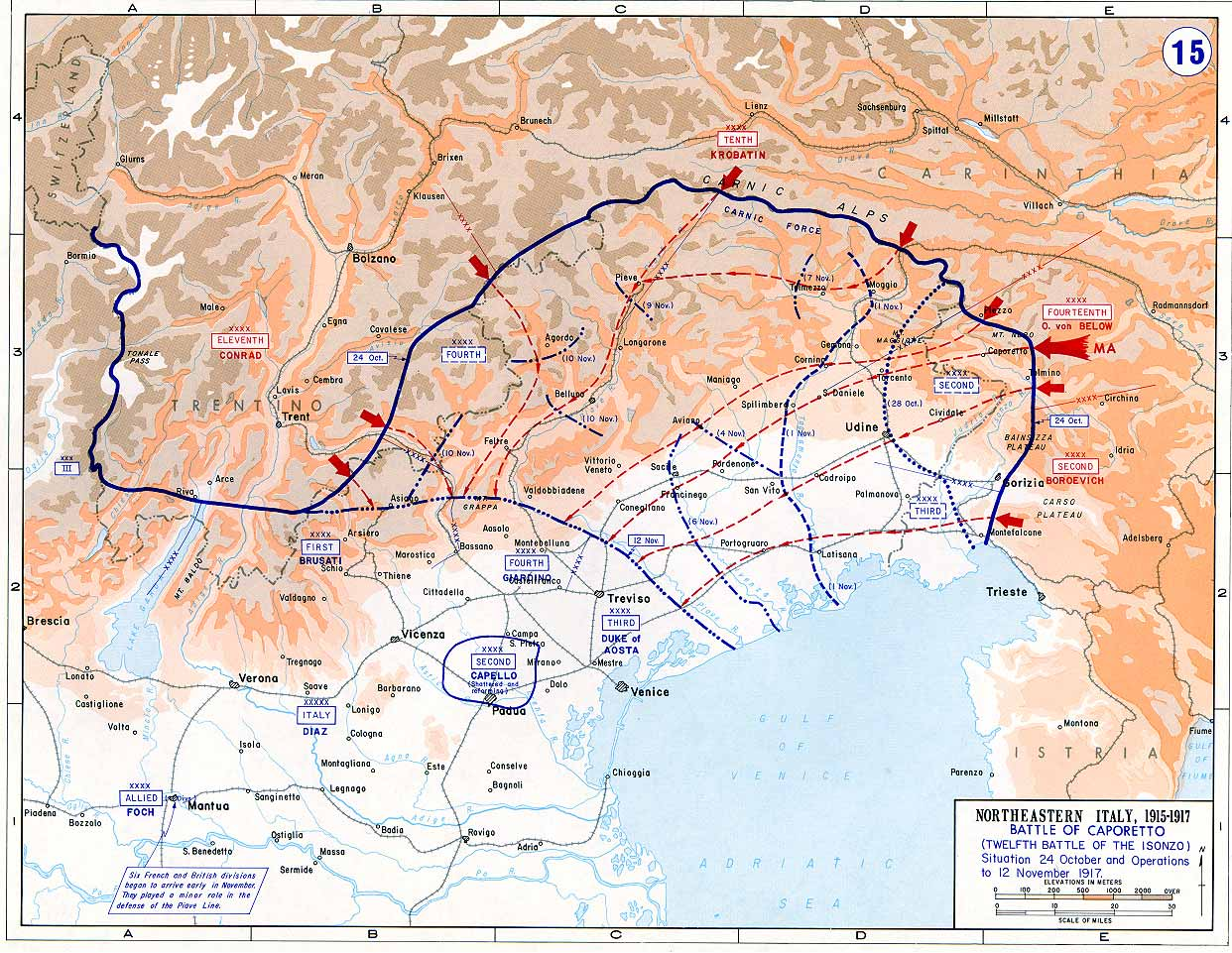
The Battle of Caporetto

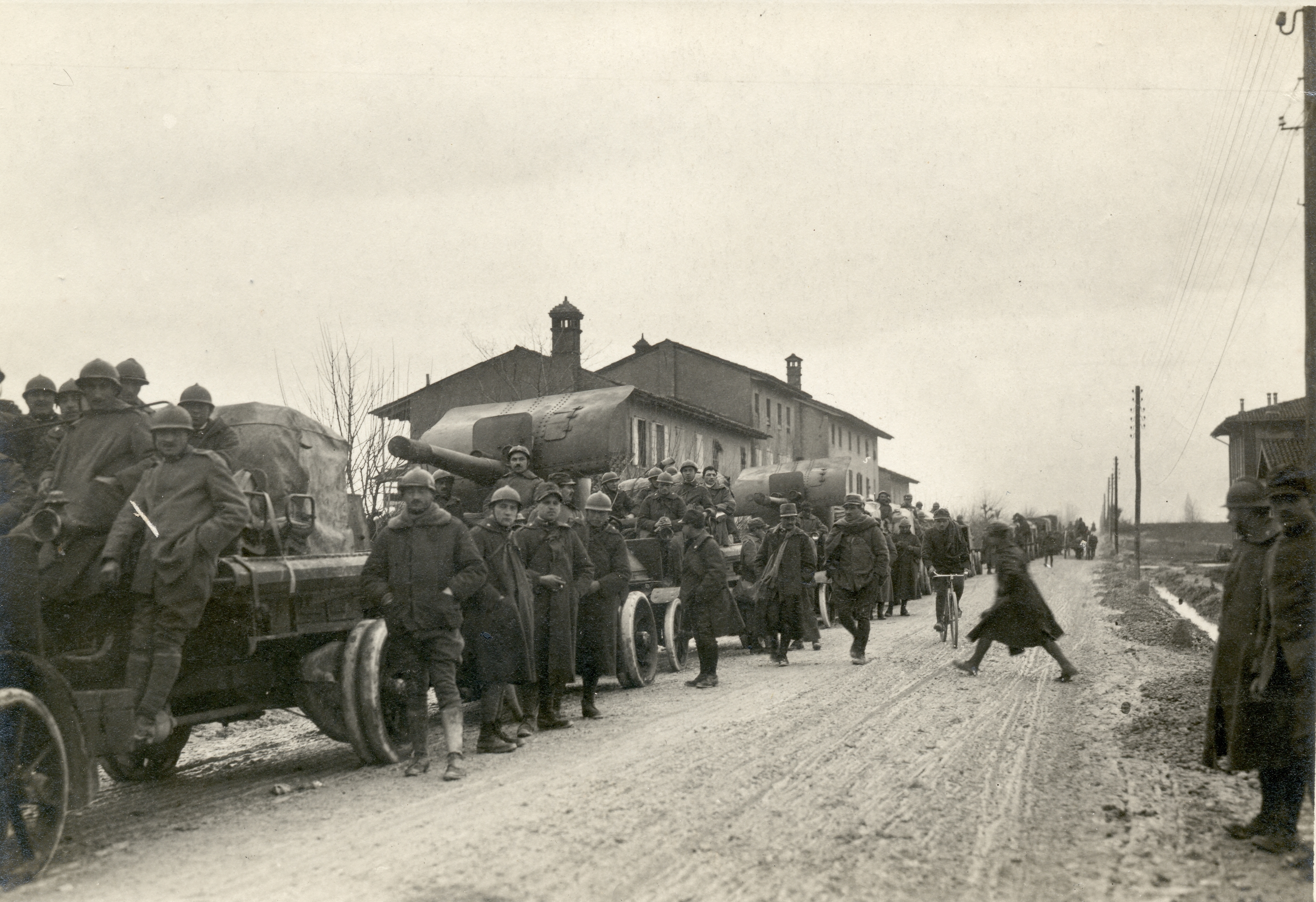
Italian 102/35 anti-air guns mounted on SPA 9000C trucks during the retreat

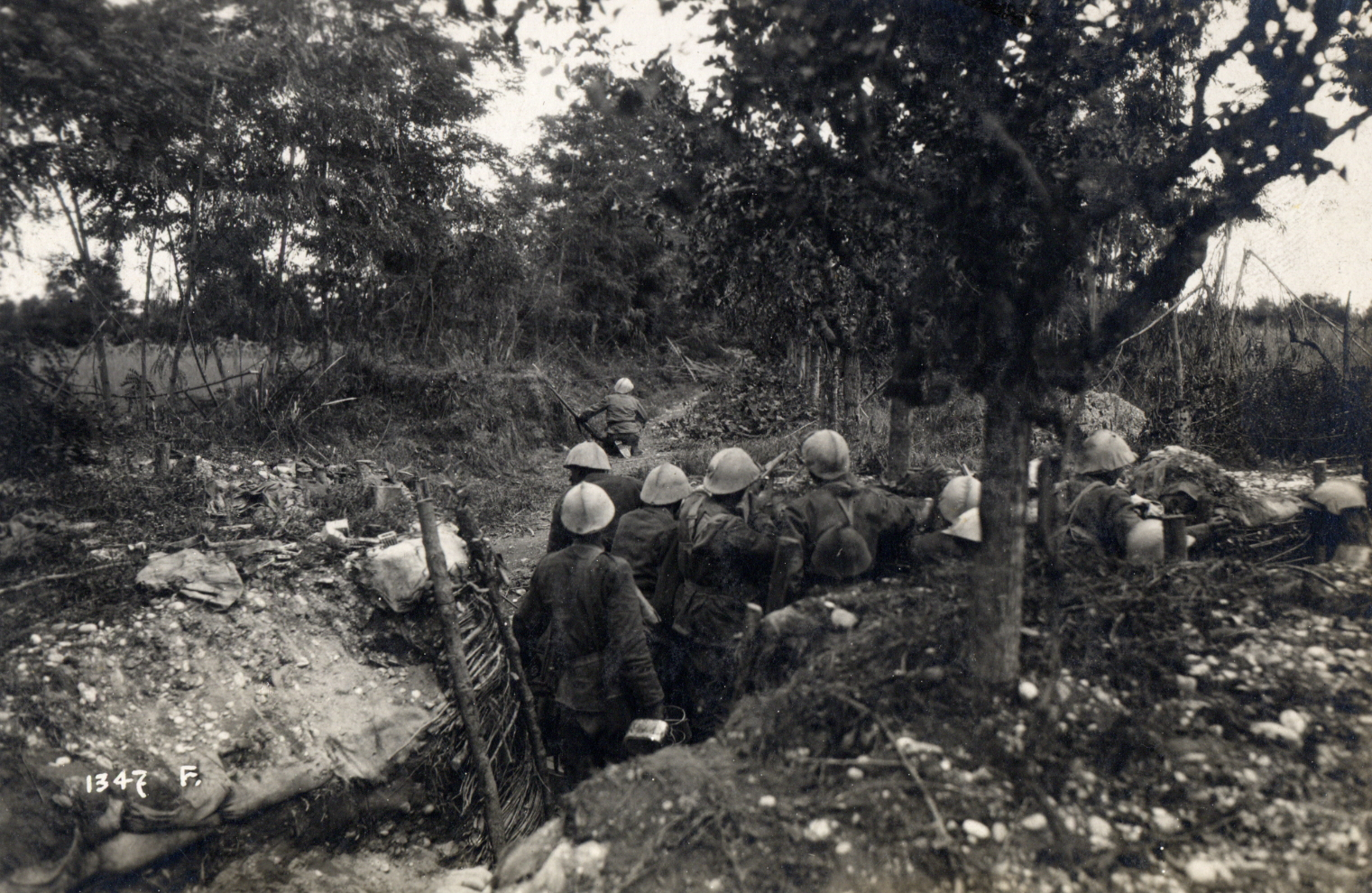
Provisional Italian trenches along the Piave River

The Austro-Hungarians received the desperately needed reinforcements after the Eleventh Battle of the Isonzo from German Army soldiers rushed in after the Russian offensive ordered by Kerensky of July 1917 failed. German troops from Romanian front also arrived, after the Battle of Mărășești. The Germans introduced infiltration tactics to the Austro-Hungarian front and helped work on a new offensive. On 24 October 1917 the Germans and Austro-Hungarians launched the Battle of Caporetto (Italian name for Kobarid or Karfreit in German). Chlorine-arsenic agent and diphosgene gas shells were fired as part of a huge artillery barrage, followed by infantry using infiltration tactics, bypassing enemy strong points and attacking on the Italian rear. At the end of the first day. From Caporetto the Austro-Hungarians advanced for 150 km (93 mi) south-west, reaching Udine after only four days. The defeat of Caporetto caused the disintegration of the whole Italian front of the Isonzo. The situation was re-established by forming a stop line on the Tagliamento and then on the Piave rivers, but at the price of 10,000 dead, 30,000 wounded, 265,000 prisoners, 300,000 stragglers, 50,000 deserters, over 3,000 artillery pieces, 3,000 machine guns and 1,700 mortars. The Austro-Hungarian and German losses totaled 70,000. Cadorna, who attributed the causes of the disaster to unproven treason of some unspecified units, was relieved of duty. On 8 November 1917 he was replaced by Armando Diaz.

==== Battle of Monte Grappa (First Battle of the Piave river) ====
In November 1917, the new Italian chief of staff, Armando Diaz ordered Italian troops to stop the retreat and defend the fortified defenses around the Monte Grappa summit between the Roncone and the Tomatico mountains; although numerically inferior (51,000 against 120,000) the Italian Army managed to halt the German and Austro-Hungarian armies in the First Battle of Monte Grappa (also known as first battle of the Piaver river). The Central Powers's general offensive on the Piave, the Altopiano di Asiago, and the Monte Grappa failed and the Italian front reverted to attritional trench warfare. The Italian army was forced to call the 1899 levy, while that of 1900 was left for a hypothetical final effort for the year of 1919.

=== 1918: The war ends ===
==== Second Battle of the Piave River (June 1918) ====
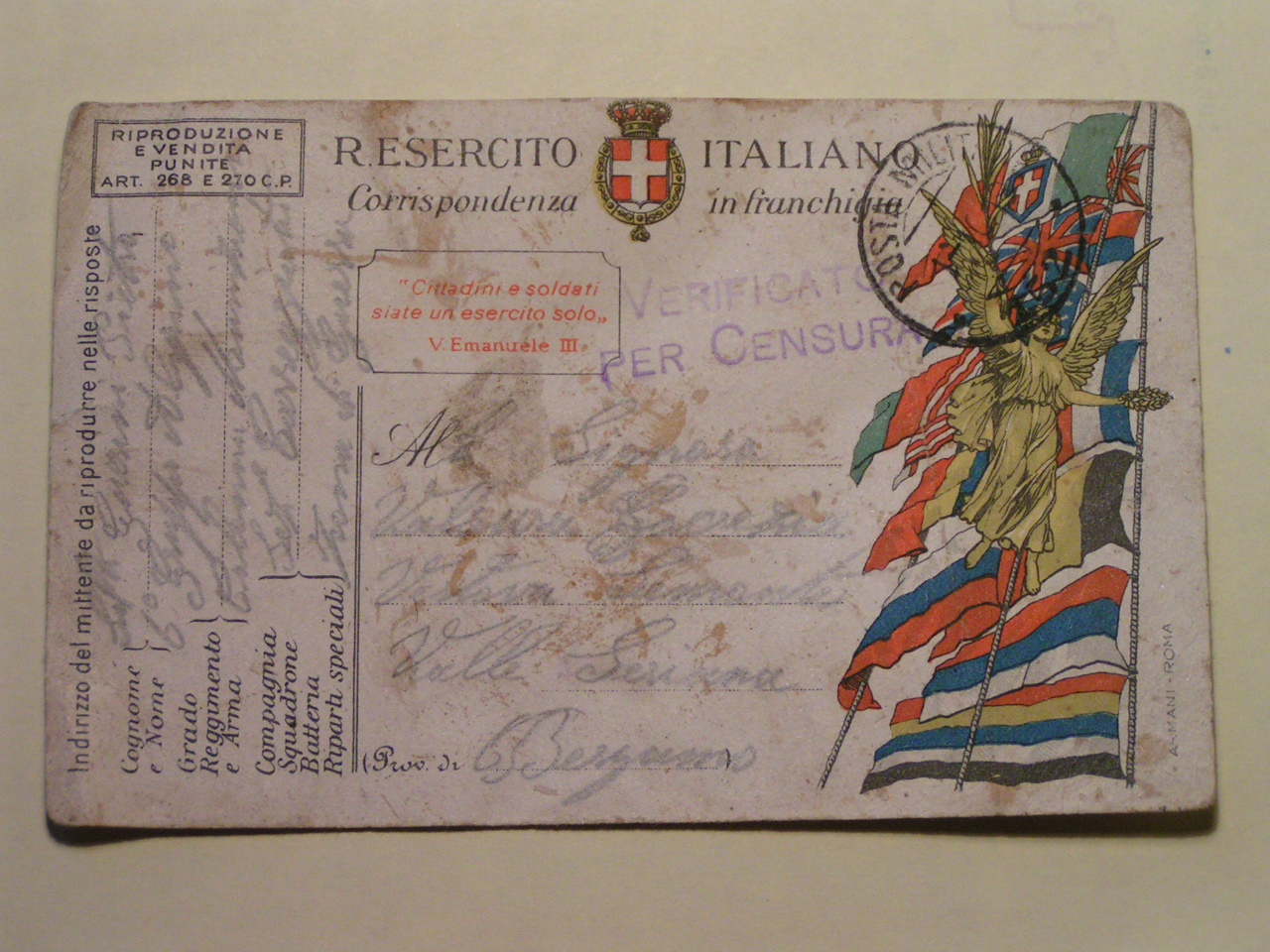
Postcard sent from an Italian soldier to his family, c. 1917

The Italians, who had retreated to defensive lines near Venice on the Piave River, had suffered 600,000 casualties to this point in the war. Because of these losses, the Italian Government called to arms the so-called 99 Boys (Ragazzi del '99); the new class of conscripts born in 1899 who were turning 18 in 1917. After the Italian had stopped the German-Austrian offensive at Monte Grappa, the British and French troops had started to bolster the front line, from the 5 and 6 divisions respectively provided. (Note: The French units were (i) 12th Army Corps (France) (ii) 10th Army (France) and (iii) 31st Army Corps (France) comprising (1) 23rd Division, 24th Division, (2) 46th Division, 47th Division and (3) 64th Division, 65th Division respectively.) Far more decisive to the war effort than their troops was the Allies economic assistance by providing strategic materials (steel, coal and crops – provided by the British but imported from Argentina – etc.), which Italy always lacked sorely. In the spring of 1918, Germany pulled out its troops for use in its upcoming Spring Offensive on the Western Front. As a result of the Spring Offensive, Britain and France also pulled half of their divisions back to the Western Front.

The Austro-Hungarians now began debating how to finish the war in Italy. The Austro-Hungarian generals disagreed on how to administer the final offensive. Archduke Joseph August of Austria decided for a two-pronged offensive, where it would prove impossible for the two forces to communicate in the mountains.

The offensive was renewed on 15 June 1918 with Austro-Hungarian troops launching the Second Battle of the Piave River. The battle began with a diversionary attack near the Tonale Pass named Lawine, which the Italians repulsed after two days of fighting. Austrian deserters betrayed the objectives of the upcoming offensive, which allowed the Italians to move two armies directly in the path of the Austrian prongs. The other prong, led by general Svetozar Boroević von Bojna initially experienced success until aircraft bombed their supply lines and Italian reinforcements arrived.

Italy's resistance to the assault and the failure of the offensive marked the swan song of Austria-Hungary on the Italian front. The Central Powers proved finally unable to sustain further the war effort, while the multi-ethnic entities of the Austro-Hungarian Empire were on the verge of rebellion. The Italians rescheduled earlier their planned 1919 counter-offensive to October 1918, in order to take advantage of the Austro-Hungarian crisis.

==== The decisive Battle of Vittorio Veneto (October–November 1918) ====
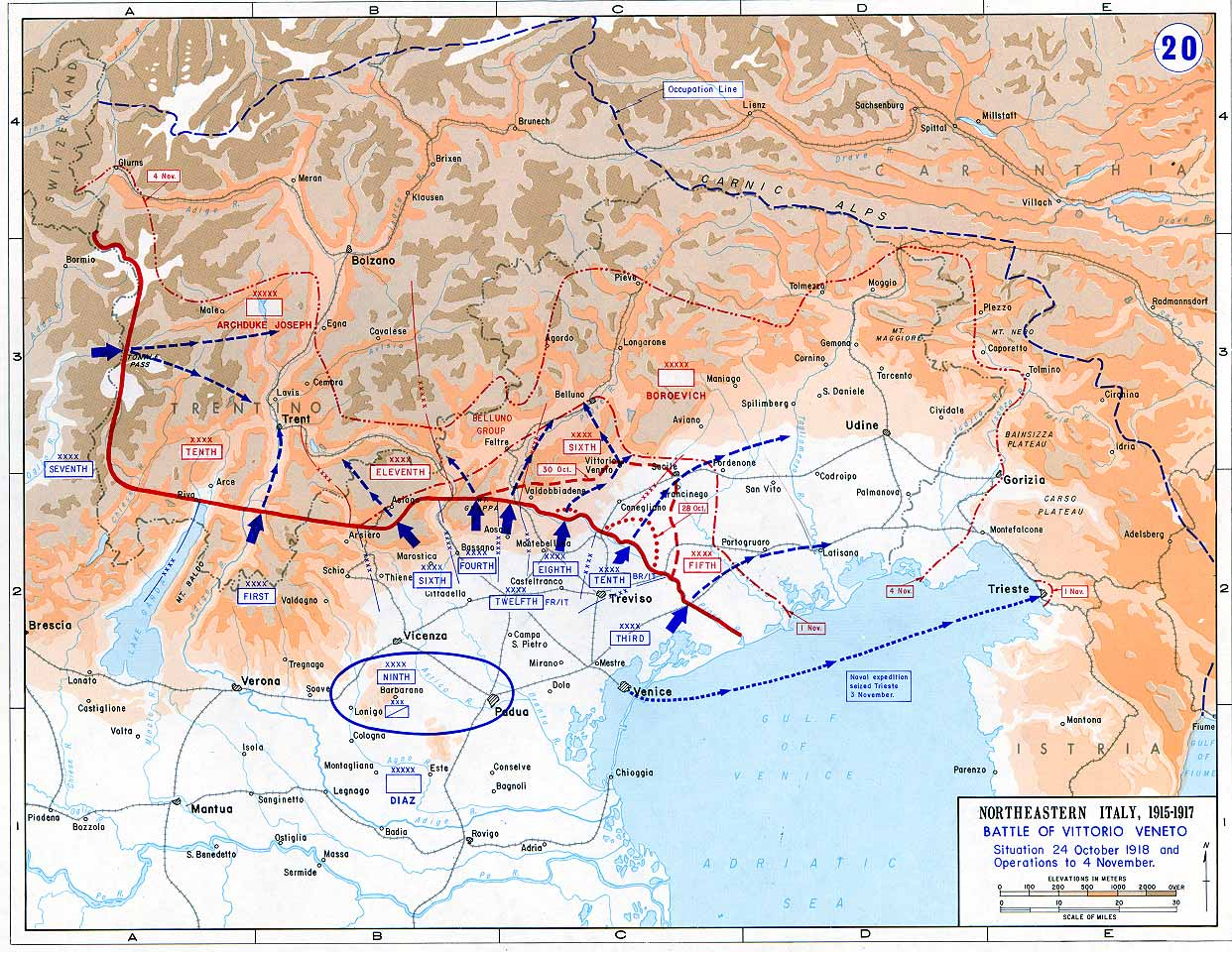
The Italian front in 1918 and the Battle of Vittorio Veneto

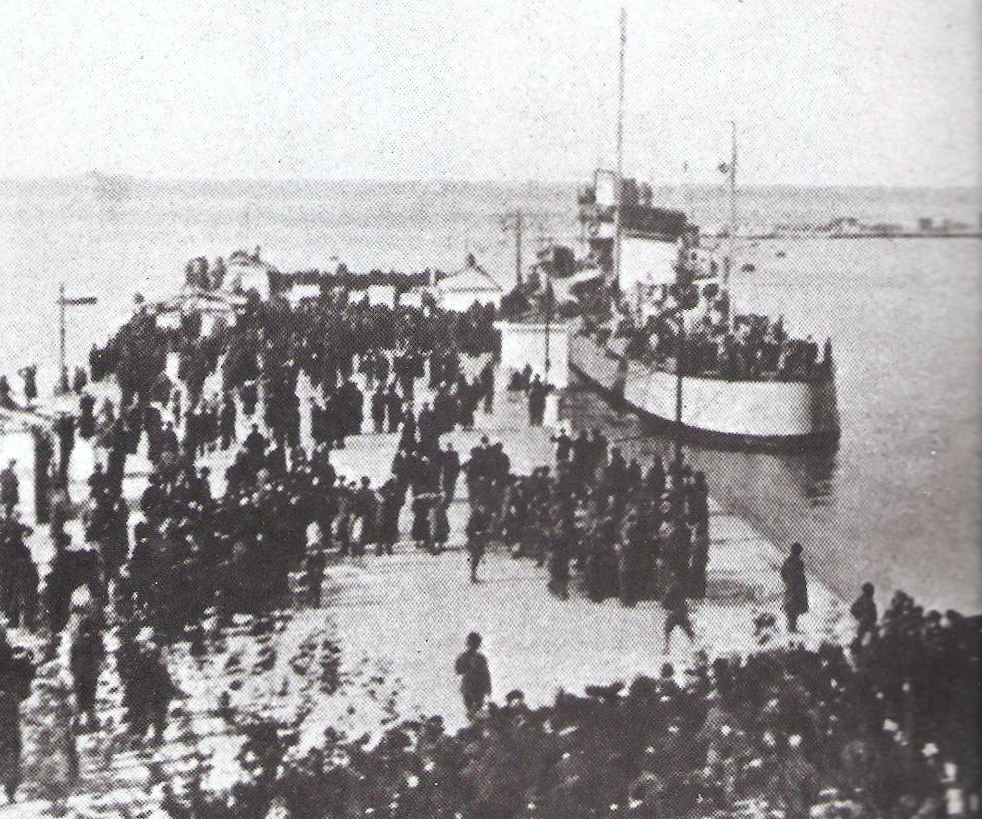
Italian troops landing in Trieste, 3 November 1918, after the victorious Battle of Vittorio Veneto. The Italian victory in this battle marked the end of the war on the Italian Front, secured the dissolution of the Austro-Hungarian Empire and contributed to the end of World War I just one week later.

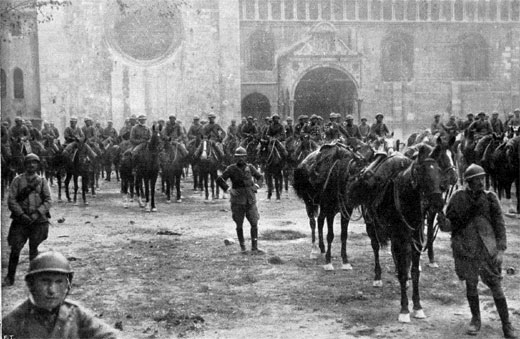
Italian cavalry in Trento on 3 November 1918, after the victorious Battle of Vittorio Veneto

Following the second battle of the Piave, Austro-Hungary was in a dire situation. Furthermore, the blockade of the Adriatic by the Italian and Allied navies caused a severe economic crisis in Austria-Hungary. Parts of the Habsburg empire aimed at independence and some troops started disobeying orders and deserting. Many Czechoslovak troops, in fact, started working for the Allied Cause, and in September 1918, five Czechoslovak Regiments were formed in the Italian Army. To the disappointment of Italy's allies, the Italian counter-offensive was delayed. The Italian Army had a slight numerical advantage, and considered an offensive dangerous. General Armando Diaz waited for more reinforcements to arrive.

The Italian attack of 52 Italian divisions, aided by 3 British 2 French divisions and 1 American regiment, 65,000 total and Czechoslovaks (see British and French forces in Italy during World War I), was started on 24 October. It came to be known as the Vittorio Veneto or the Third Battle of the Piave river. The Austro-Hungarians fought tenaciously for four days, but then the Italians managed to cross the Piave and establish a bridgehead; in a few days, the Austro-Hungarians were routed and the whole front began to collapse. Furthermore, troops heard of revolutions and independence proclamations in the lands of the Dual Monarchy. Austria-Hungary asked for an armistice on 29 October. By 3 November, 300,000 Austro-Hungarian soldiers surrendered, at the same day the Italians entered Trento and Trieste. The armistice was signed on 3 November at Villa Giusti, near Padua. The Italian victory was announced by the Bollettino della Vittoria and the Bollettino della Vittoria Navale.

Italian soldiers entered Trento while Bersaglieri landed from the sea in Trieste, greeted by the population. The following day the Istrian cities of Rovigno and Parenzo, the Dalmatian island of Lissa, and the cities of Zara and Fiume were occupied: the latter was not included in the territories originally promised secretly by the Allies to Italy in case of victory, but the Italians decided to intervene in reply to a local National Council, formed after the flight of the Hungarians, and which had announced the union to the Kingdom of Italy. The Regia Marina occupied Pola, Sebenico and Zara, which became the capital of the Governorate of Dalmatia.The Governorate of Dalmatia had the provisional aim of ferrying the territory towards full integration into the Kingdom of Italy, progressively importing national legislation in place of the previous one. The Governorate of Dalmatia was evacuated following the Italo-Yugoslav agreements which resulted in the Treaty of Rapallo (1920). Italy also occupied Innsbruck and all Tyrol by the III Corps of the First Army with 20–22,000 soldiers.

== Other theaters ==
=== Balkans ===
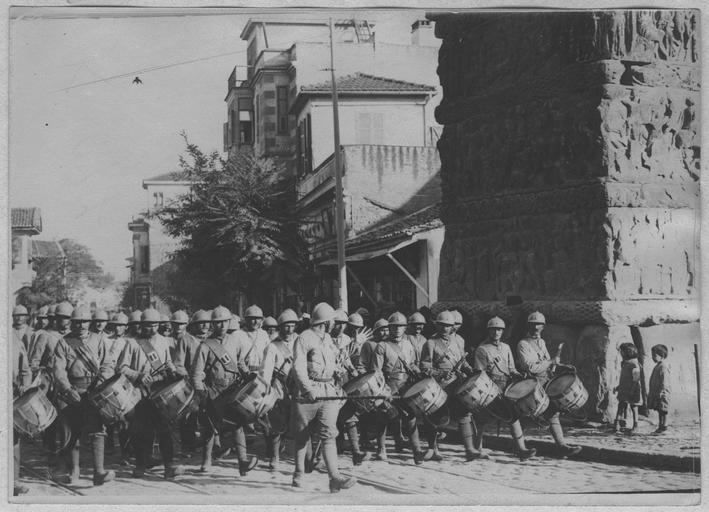
Italian troops in Thessaloniki, 1916

Italian troops played a major role in the defence of Albania against Austria-Hungary. From 1916 the Italian 35th Division fought on the Salonika front as part of the Allied Army of the Orient. The Italian XVI Corps (a separate entity independent from the Army of the Orient) took part in actions against Austro-Hungarian forces in Albania.

=== Western Front ===
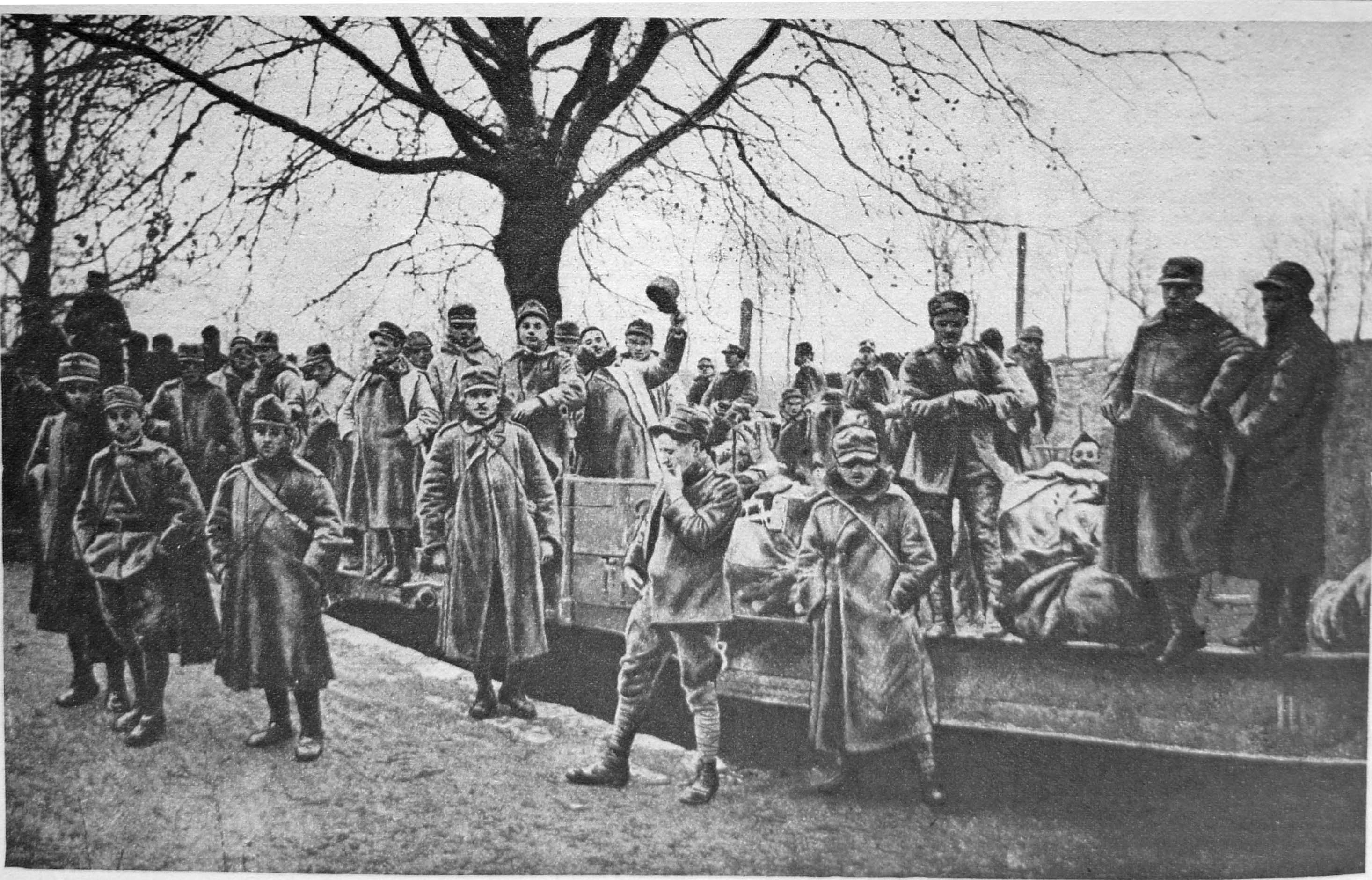
Arrival of Italian troops at the Western front

Some Italian divisions were also sent to support the entente on the Western Front. In 1918 Italian troops saw intense combat during the German spring offensive. Their most prominent engagement on this front was their role in the Second Battle of the Marne and in the 100 days offensive.

=== Middle East ===
Italy played a token role in the Sinai and Palestine Campaign, sending a detachment of five hundred soldiers to assist the British there in 1917.

=== Africa ===
In Africa, Italy faced local movements supported by the Ottomans and Germans, fighting defensive campaigns to retain her colonial presence in Libya and Somalia.

==== Libya ====
As a result of the 1911-1912 Italo-Turkish War, Italians acquired Tripolitania and Cyrenaica from the Ottoman Empire, with their forces controlling the main centres of Libya, on the coast. Italy then began to expand into the interior but, preparing to enter World War I, cut its occupation force and was forced to retreat back to the coast after some reverses (near Mizda and Gasr Bu Hadi) and uprisings.

After Italy entered the war, the Ottoman sultan tasked Sayed Ahmed to recover Libya and supported (together with the Germans) the Senussi and other groups against the Italians. Ottoman–German operations were based at Misratah, where a submarine visited every couple of weeks to deliver arms and ammunition. The Italians retained their coastal strongholds and, in 1916, re-occupied Zuwarah in Tripolitania (followed in 1917 by Agilat, Sidi Bilal, Saiad and Janzur) and Bardia in Cyrenaica. In April 1917, the Accords of Acroma were signed between the Italians and the Senussi. The latter stopped conducting attacks on the Italians and ended their allegiance to the Ottomans. The armistice with the Ottoman empire and the Paris Peace conference, resulting in the treaty of Sevrès (1920), confirmed the Italian possession of Libya and deprived the Sultan of the religious role and rights (as caliph) he had retained in the area per the 1912 peace.

==== Somalia ====
During World War I, the Dervishes (supported by the Ottomans) conducted raids into Italian-controlled territories, but were stopped by the garrisons of Bulo Burti and Tiyeglow; on 27 March 1916, thanks to the betrayal of some Somali irregulars hired into the service of the Italians, the dervishes sacked the fort of Bulo Burti. Italian officer Battistella was killed in this attack. After the recapture of Bulo Burti, an Italian column under captain Silvestri defeated and dispersed the Dervishes in the battle of Beledweyne (16 January 1917), which was the main base of operations against Italian Somaliland. The Italian column had light casualties (6 dead and 4 wounded), while the Dervishes suffered 50 dead and numerous wounded; furthermore, the Italians captured 200 camels, depriving Dervishes of their mobility. The Dervishes stopped conducting significant attacks on Italian Somaliland for the rest of World War I.

== Aftermath ==
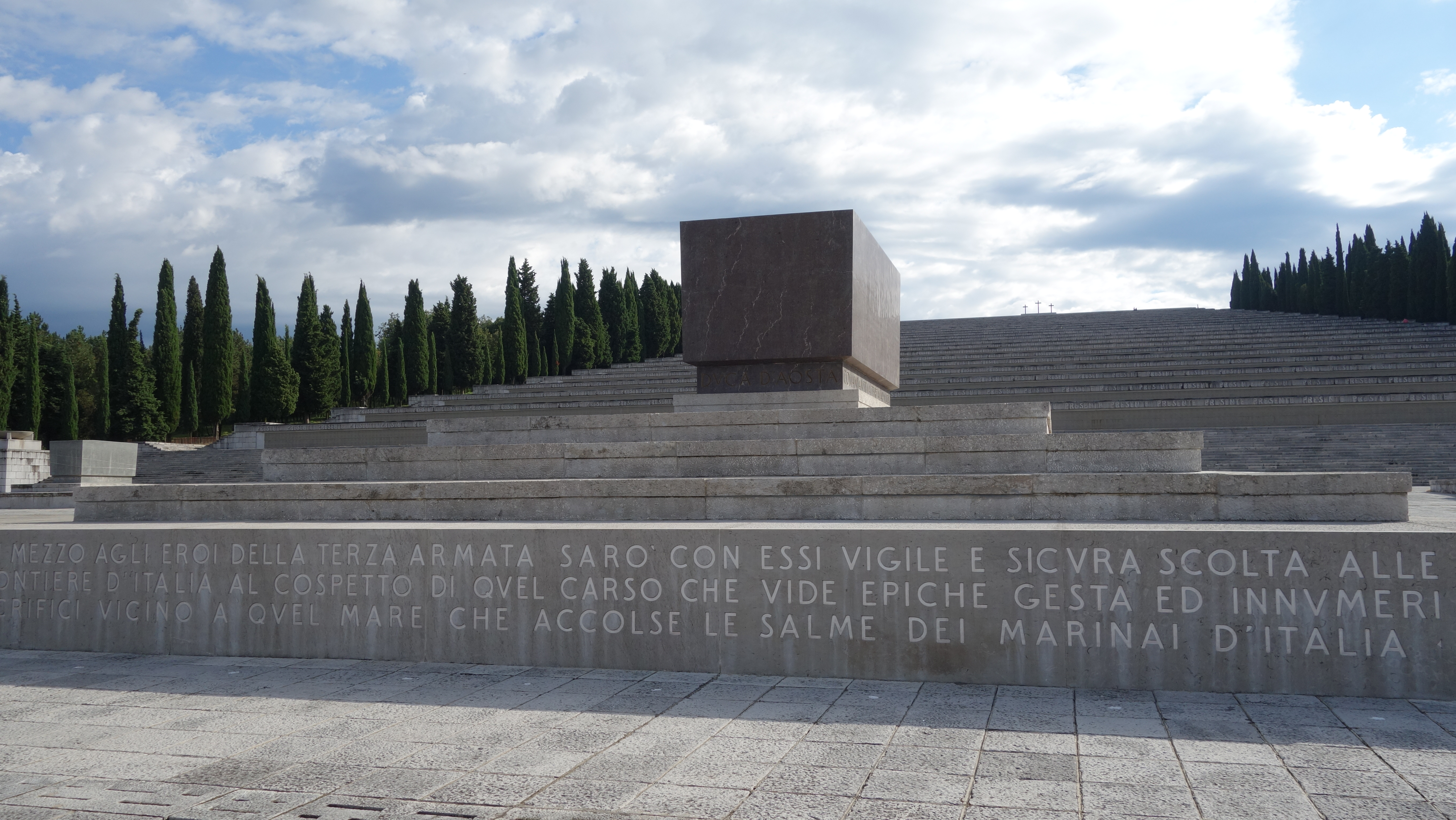
The Redipuglia War Memorial of Redipuglia, with the tomb of Prince Emanuele Filiberto, Duke of Aosta in the foreground, nicknamed the Undefeated Duke for having reported numerous victories in the First World War without ever being defeated on the battlefield.

As the war came to an end, Italian Prime Minister Vittorio Emanuele Orlando met with British Prime Minister David Lloyd George, Prime Minister of France Georges Clemenceau and United States President Woodrow Wilson in Versailles to discuss how the borders of Europe should be redefined to help avoid a future European war. The talks provided territorial gains to Italy, including the main "irredent lands" of Trento and Trieste, as well as German-speaking South Tyrol and Istria, but not all the promises in the London pact were kept, as Wilson promised freedom to all European nationalities to form their nation-states. As a result, the Treaty of Versailles did not assign Dalmatia to Italy as had been promised. Furthermore, the British and French decided to divide the German and Ottoman overseas possessions into their mandates; Italy received some minor colonial compensations per the treaty of London. The Italian population in Fiume requested annexation by Italy, but Wilson opposed this. Despite this, Orlando agreed to sign the Treaty of Versailles, which caused uproar by a part of the nationalists against his government. The Treaty of Saint-Germain-en-Laye (1919) and the Treaty of Rapallo (1920) allowed the annexation of Trentino Alto-Adige, Julian March, Istria, Kvarner as well as the Dalmatian city of Zara.

Furious over the Fiume issue, the Italian nationalist poet Gabriele D'Annunzio (also famous for the August 9th 1918 Flight over Vienna) led disaffected war veterans and nationalists to form the Free State of Fiume in September 1919. His popularity among nationalists led him to be called Il Duce ("The Leader"), and he used black-shirted paramilitary in his assault on Fiume. The leadership title of Duce and the blackshirt paramilitary uniform would later be adopted by the fascist movement of Benito Mussolini. The demand for the Italian annexation of Fiume spread to all sides of the political spectrum.

The subsequent Treaty of Rome (1924) led to the annexation of the city of Fiume to Italy. The peace settlement had led D'Annunzion to denounce betrayal by the allies and a mutilated victory. The rhetoric of mutilated victory was adopted by Mussolini and led to the rise of Italian fascism, becoming a key point in the propaganda of Fascist Italy. Historians regard mutilated victory as a "political myth", used by fascists to fuel Italian imperialism and obscure the successes of liberal Italy in the aftermath of World War I. Italy also gained a permanent seat in the League of Nations's executive council.

Roy Pryce summarized the experience as follows:

The government's hope was that the war would be the culmination of Italy's struggle for national independence. Her new allies promised her the "natural frontiers" which she had so long sought-the Trentino and Trieste-and something more. At the end of hostilities she did indeed extend her territory, but she came away from the peace conference dissatisfied with her reward for three and a half years' bitter warfare, having lost half a million of her noblest youth, with her economy impoverished and internal divisions more bitter than ever. That strife could not be resolved within the framework of the old parliamentary regime. The war that was to have been the climax of the Risorgimento produced the Fascist dictatorship. Something, somewhere, had gone wrong.

== See also ==
- Propaganda and censorship in Italy during the First World War
- Italian prisoners of war in the First World War
- Causes of World War I

== Sources ==
- Keegan, John (2001). The first World War; An Illustrated History. London: Hutchinson. ISBN 0-09-179392-0.
- Keegan, John (1998). The first World War. London: Random House (UK). ISBN 0-09-1801788.
- Pompé, Daniel; et al., eds. (1924). Les armées françaises dans la Grande guerre. Tome X. 2e Volume. Ordres de bataille des grandes unités - Divisions d'Infanterie, Divisions de Cavalerie [10,2]. Ministère De la Guerre, Etat-Major de l'Armée - Service Historique (in French) (1st ed.). Paris: Imprimerie Nationale.
- Scala, Edoardo (1959). Storia delle fanterie italiane: le fanterie nella prima guerra mondiale, vol. V,. Biblioteca storica de Il Giornale.
- Geloso, Carlo. Il primo anno di Guerra. Milano: Corbaccio.
- Brignoli, Marziano (2012). Il generale Luigi Cadorna. Udine: Gaspari Editore.
