= Bollettino della Vittoria Navale =

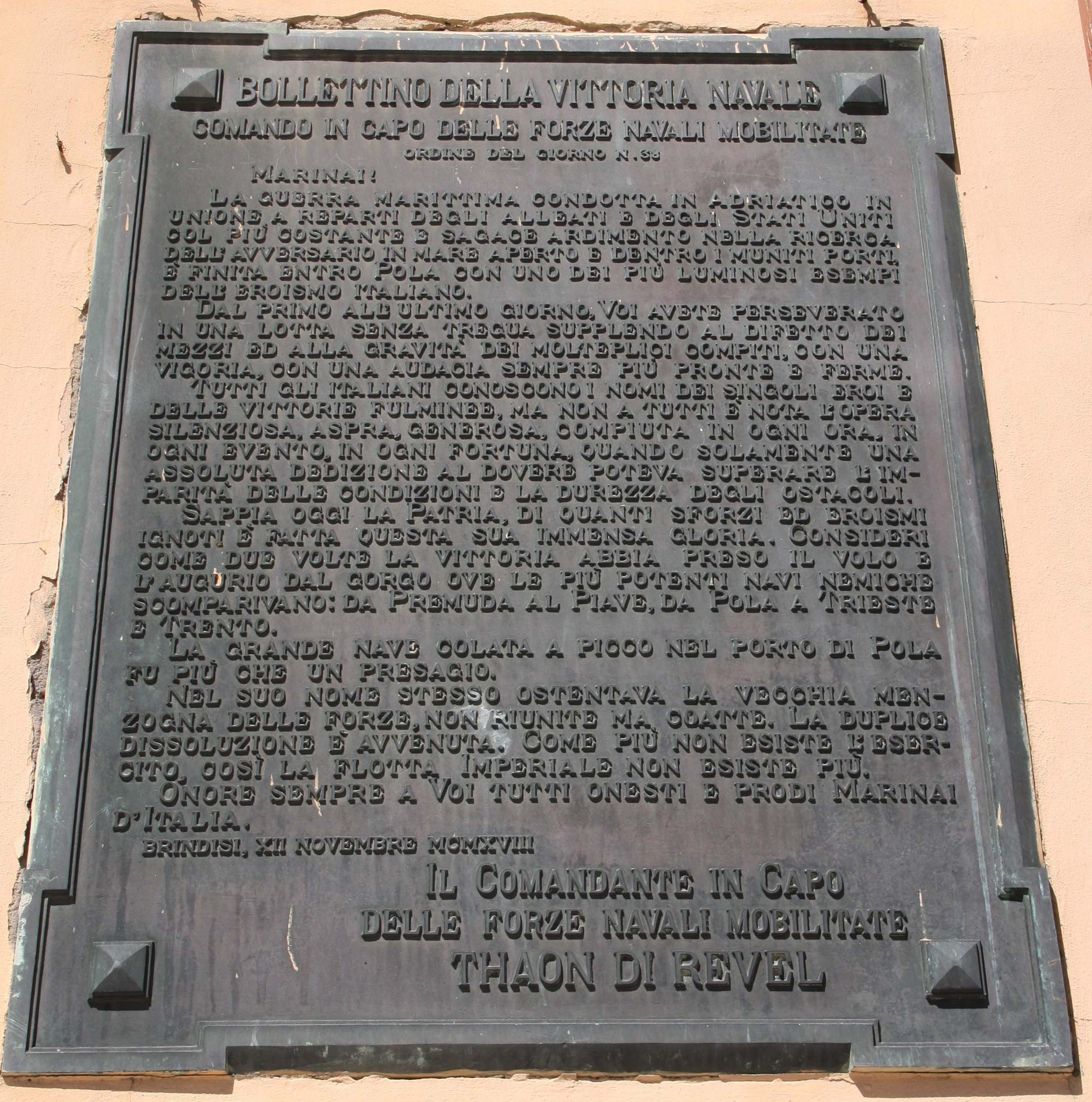
Bronze plaque at the Town Hall building of Livorno

The Bollettino della Vittoria Navale (or simply Bollettino della Vittoria) is the official document written after the Armistice of Villa Giusti with which the admiral Paolo Thaon di Revel, supreme commander of the Royal Italian Navy, announced, on 12 November 1918, the surrender on the seas of the Austro-Hungarian Empire and Italy's victory in the World War I.

== Description ==
The Bollettino della Vittoria Navale was issued on 12 November 1918 by the Etna ship, which was anchored in the port of Brindisi: the latter had in fact been the main operational center of the war in the Adriatic Sea.

== Legacy ==
From the cataloging of the documents of Paolo Emilio Thaon di Revel, kept at the Spadolini Foundation in Florence, it emerged that his material author was actually Gabriele D'Annunzio.

Similarly, the Bollettino della Vittoria was signed by general Armando Diaz, supreme commander of the Royal Italian Army. A similar bulletin was never drafted for the air forces, given that the latter were part of the Aeronautical Service, a department destined to the Royal Italian Army aircraft: the Royal Air Force, the third armed force of the Kingdom of Italy, was in fact established in 1923, after the end of the World War I.

== Text ==
=== Italian ===
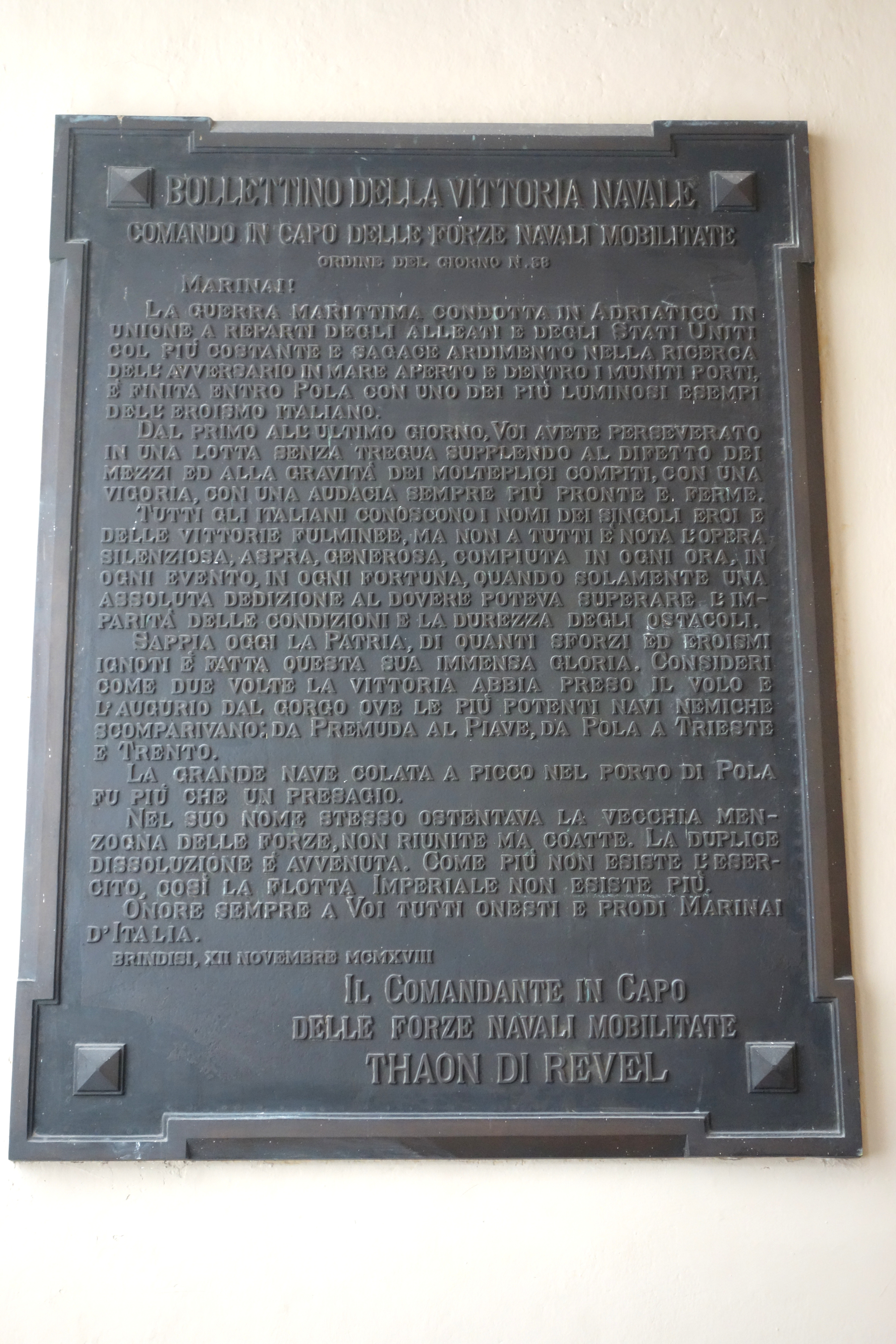
Bronze plaque at Villa Giustiniani Cambiaso of Genoa

Brindisi, 12 novembre 1918

Comando in Capo delle Forze Navali mobilitate, Ordine del giorno n. 38

La guerra marittima condotta in Adriatico in unione a reparti degli Alleati e degli Stati Uniti col più costante e sagace ardimento nella ricerca dell'avversario in mare aperto e dentro i muniti porti è finita entro Pola con uno dei più luminosi esempi dell'eroismo italiano. Dal primo all'ultimo giorno, Voi avete perseverato in una lotta senza tregua supplendo al difetto dei mezzi ed alla gravità dei molteplici compiti, con una vigoria, con una audacia sempre più pronte e ferme. Tutti gli italiani conoscono i nomi dei singoli eroi e delle vittorie fulminee, ma non a tutti è nota l'opera silenziosa, aspra, generosa, compiuta in ogni ora, in ogni evento, in ogni fortuna, quando solamente una assoluta dedizione al dovere poteva superare l'imparità delle condizioni e la durezza degli ostacoli. Sappia oggi la Patria, di quanti sforzi ed eroismi ignoti è fatta questa sua immensa Gloria. Consideri come due volte la Vittoria abbia preso il volo e l'augurio dal gorgo ove le più potenti navi nemiche scomparivano: da Premuda al Piave, da Pola a Trieste e Trento. La grande nave colata a picco nel porto di Pola fu più che un presagio. Nel suo nome stesso ostentava la vecchia menzogna delle forze, non riunite ma coatte. La duplice dissoluzione è avvenuta. Come più non esiste l'esercito, così la flotta Imperiale non esiste più.

Onore sempre a Voi tutti onesti e prodi Marinai d'Italia

Paolo Emilio Thaon di Revel, Comandante in Capo delle Forze Navali Mobilitate

=== English ===
Brindisi, 12 November 1918

Main Command of the Mobilized Naval Forces, Order of the Day no.38

The maritime war conducted in the Adriatic in union with Allied and United States Forces with the most constant and sagacious daring in the search for the adversary in the open sea and in the well-equipped ports ended up in Pula with one of the brightest examples of Italian heroism. From the first to the last day, you have persevered in a struggle without respite to compensate for the defect of the means and the gravity of the multiple tasks, with a vigor, with an audacity ever more ready and firm. All Italians know the names of the individual heroes and lightning victories, but not everybody knows the silent, harsh, generous work done in every hour, in every event, in every fortune, when only an absolute dedication to duty could overcome the impurity of the conditions and the hardness of the obstacles. Today, the Fatherland knows of how many efforts and unknown heroisms this immense glory has been made. Consider how twice the Victory took flight and the wish from the whirlpool where the most powerful enemy ships disappeared: from Premuda to the Piave, from Pula to Trieste and Trento. The large ship which sank in the harbor of Pula was more than an omen. In his own name he flaunted the old lie of forces, unified but coerced. The double dissolution thus has already taken place. As no army exists, so the Imperial fleet no longer exists.

Honor always to all honest and valiant sailors of Italy!

(sgd). Paolo Emilio Thaon di Revel, Commander in Chief of the Mobilized Naval Forces

== See also ==
- Bollettino della Vittoria
