= Italian prisoners of war in World War I =

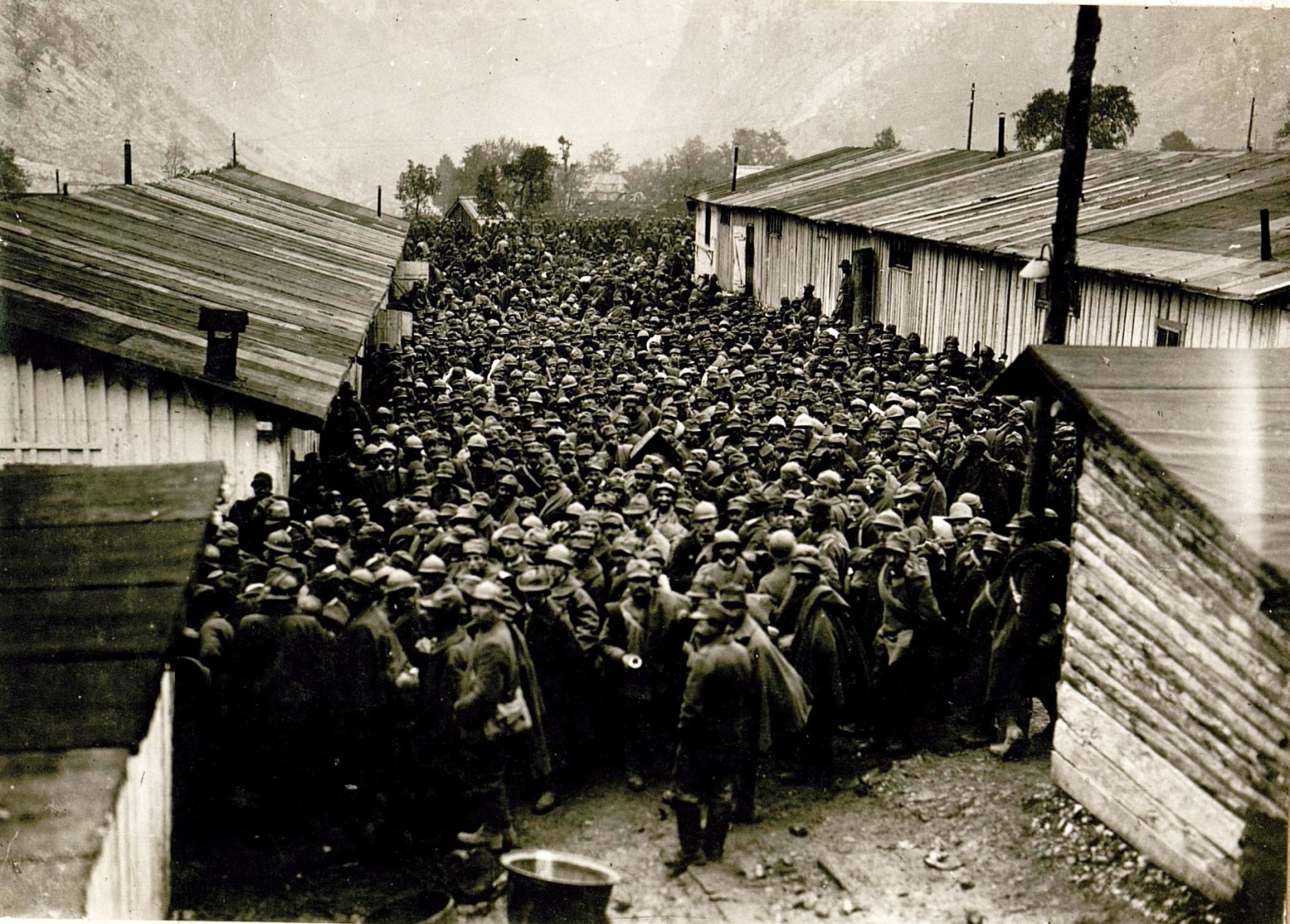
Italian prisoners after the Battle of Caporetto

Around 600,000 Italian soldiers were taken prisoner during the First World War, about half in the aftermath of Caporetto. Roughly one Italian soldier in seven was captured, a significantly higher number than in other armies on the Western Front. About 100,000 Italian prisoners of war never returned home, having succumbed to hardship, hunger, cold and disease (mainly tuberculosis). Uniquely among the Allied powers, Italy refused to assist its prisoners, and even hindered efforts by soldiers’ families to send them food. As a result, the death rate for Italian prisoners was nine times worse than that of Austro-Hungarian prisoners in Italy.

== Living conditions for the prisoners ==
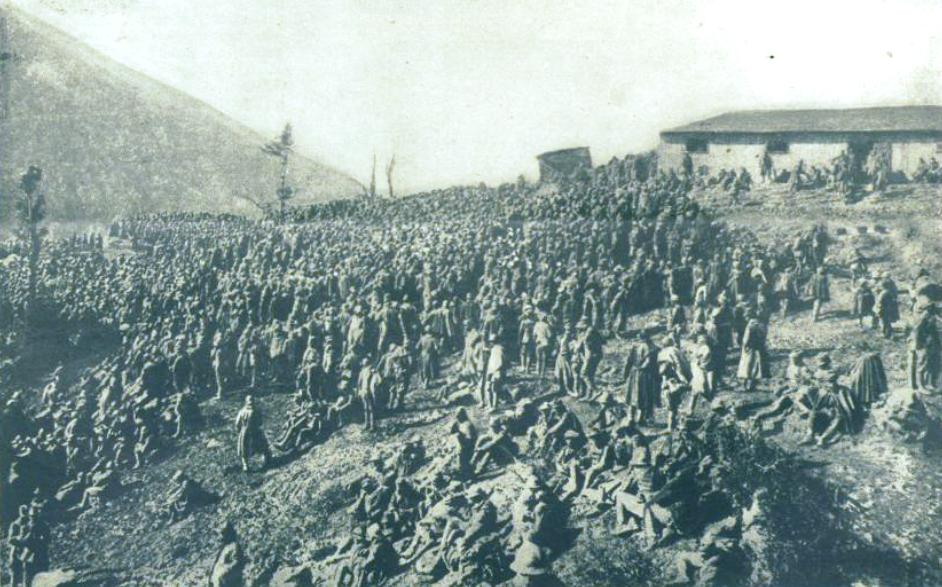
Captured Italian soldiers at the incursion of German and Austro-Hungarian troops into Friuli.

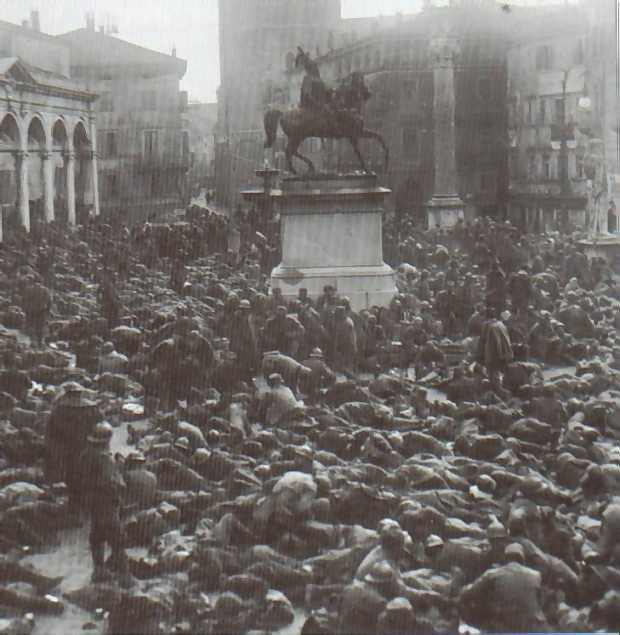
Italian prisoners of war held by the Austrians, Udine 1917

The main camps where Italian prisoners were held were at Mauthausen, Sigmundsherberg and Theresienstadt (Bohemia) in Austria-Hungary and Celle (Hanover) and Rastatt (Baden) in Germany.

Prisoners (except officers) were made to work, but while labour was compulsory, conditions were not unduly harsh. There was no systematic brutality towards Italian prisoners of war, but there was corporal punishment and occasional violence. Prisoners also had to face cold and disease, especially tuberculosis. The main hardship was a lack of food, severely aggravated by the Allied blockade that led to food shortages in Germany and Austria-Hungary.

In order to survive these conditions, aid sent by the prisoners’ families was essential. However the parcels sent to them often did not arrive, or were tampered with or looted. The lack of any organised system for delivery meant many parcels only arrived when their content was no longer edible. At the end of the war there were still 1.5 million parcels awaiting delivery in Sigmundsherberg and 72,000 in storage in Csòt bei Papa, Hungary.

Most prisoner deaths occurred in the first half of 1918 and those who died were mainly captured between October and November 1917. Only 550 out of 19,500 Italian officers in captivity died (less than 3 percent), mainly due to combat injuries. Unlike the officers, almost all private soldiers' deaths were due to deprivation.

== Refusal of public assistance ==
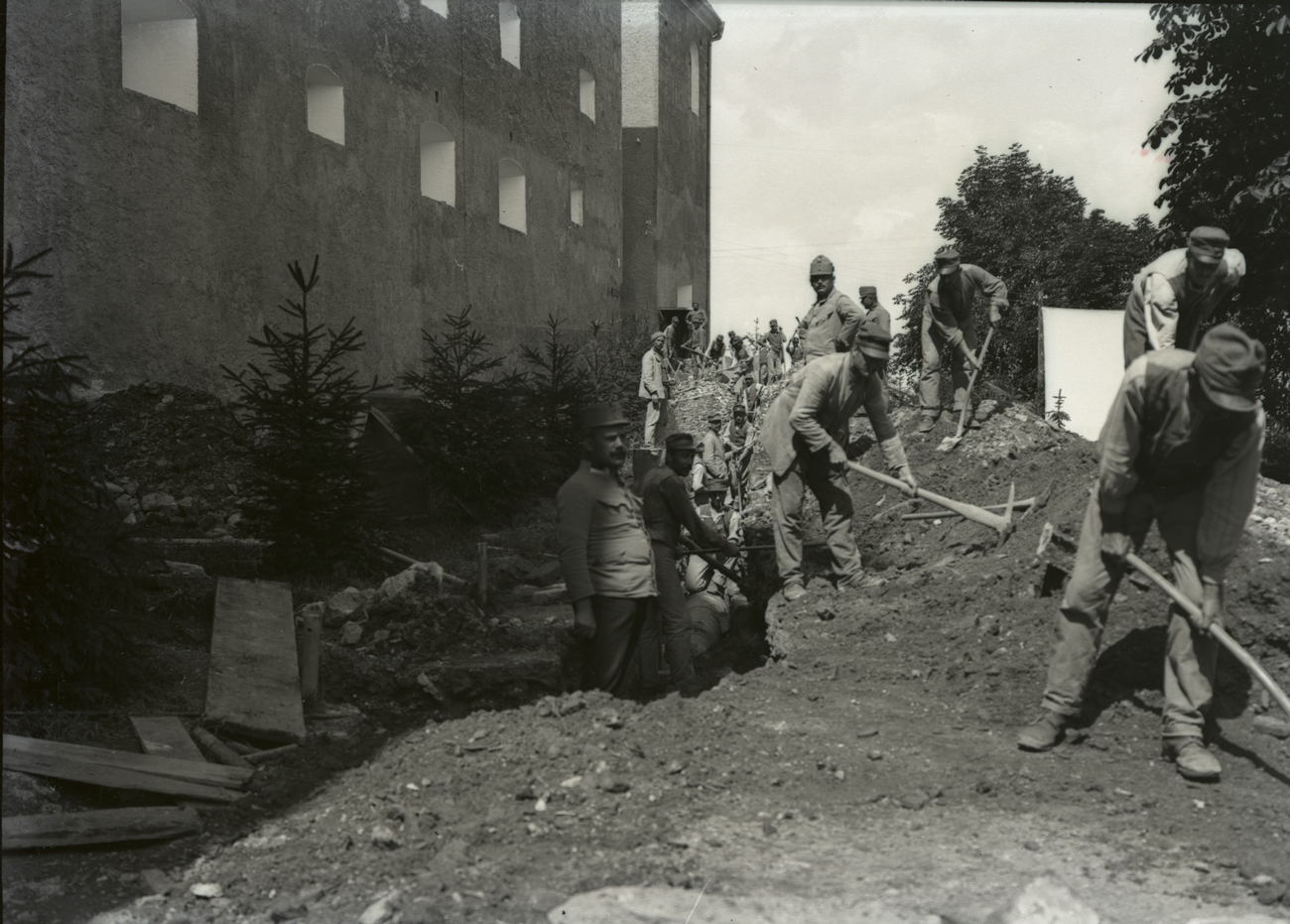
Italian prisoners of war are digging a water supply canal in Ljubljana

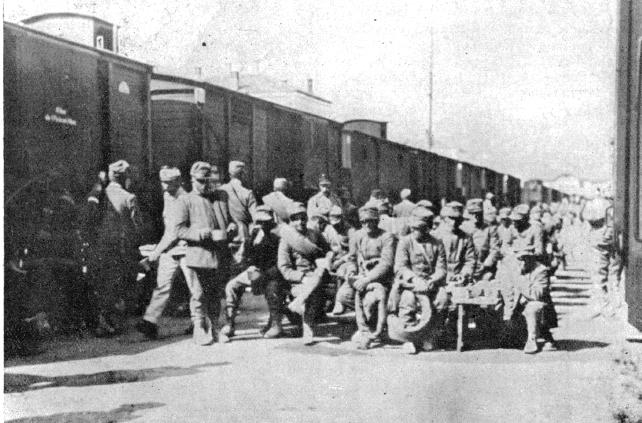
Italian prisoners of war at Ljubljana railway station after lunch, waiting for a train to take them on.

The Hague Conventions of 1899 and 1907 required countries holding prisoners of war to feed them at their own expense. Given the large number of prisoners they held, it became very hard for Germany and Austria-Hungary to meet their obligations, and when the Allied blockade was imposed, they announced that they could no longer do so.

The other Allies therefore made agreements with the Central Powers, by which they could send food securely to their own nationals in captivity. The sole exception was Italy, convinced that the prisoners were cowards, deserters or traitors, and concerned that making conditions in the prison camps easier might encourage desertions. Only at the very end of the conflict did the Italian government make partial and tentative efforts to support its captured troops.

== International comparisons and troop morale ==
The number of prisoners of war for the different combatants gives some indication of troop morale. A total of 1,700,000 Austrian soldiers were taken prisoner, compared with 180,000 British, 500,000 French and 600,000 Italians.

The morale of the Italian army took a marked turn for the worse during the Tenth Battle of the Isonzo. There were cases of the infantry refusing to launch further futile attacks, despite the punitive discipline that Army Chief of Staff Luigi Cadorna and his generals enforced. For the first time, infantrymen laid down their arms and surrendered relatively easily. The Italian casualty figures for the tenth battle included more than 27,000 taken prisoner. Morale was little higher on the other side however, and in the same campaign 24,000 Austrian troops surrendered to the Italians. The disaster of Caporetto (twelfth battle of the Isonzo), saw relatively low Italian casualties—10,000 killed and 30,000 wounded—but around 280,000 Italians were taken prisoner and a further 350,000 simply deserted.

Cadorna had no doubt that there were too many Italian prisoners of war, and that they were guilty of a lack of martial spirit, cowardice, or—worst of all—desertion. The strict discipline imposed on the troops may have been a factor in some cases in their allowing themselves to be taken, but it is not possible to determine how many Italian soldiers were captured in combat and how many simply gave up fighting.

== Official Italian attitudes towards POWs ==
In comparison with their neighbours, Italy's soldiers were treated harshly by their own commanders. Italy mobilised the same number of men as mainland Britain, and executed at least three times as many. No other army routinely punished entire units by ‘decimation’, executing randomly selected men. Only the Italian government treated its captured soldiers as cowards or defectors, blocking the delivery of food.

Official Italian propaganda dealt with the prisoners of war almost entirely by reaffirming the dishonorable character of their condition: the prisoners were "unfortunate and shamed" men who had "sinned against the fatherland", as nationalist writer Gabriele D'Annunzio proclaimed and repeated in the press. The defeat at Caporetto sealed this disapproval. At the same time, the propaganda included a series of pamphlets distributed in 1917–1918, describing in grim detail the living conditions of the prisoners. The intention was to stoke hatred towards the enemy, discourage the soldiers from surrendering, and spread the message that surrender was a dishonorable act that would worsen a soldier's living conditions and increase his suffering.

The unanimous view of the authorities was that looking after the prisoners was a private matter for their families and not the responsibility of the army. Indeed, Cadorna intervened to block any assistance to them, for example by prohibiting the Red Cross from fundraising for assistance to prisoners. In the aftermath of Caporetto, establishment hostility towards the prisoners was evident in the action of Foreign Minister Sidney Sonnino, who ordered a reduction in the food parcels sent to Italian prisoners in Austria and temporarily banned the sending of relief for those in Germany.

The view that prisoners were suspects who probably merited punishment prompted Cadorna’s successor, Armando Diaz, to suggest in March 1918 that on their return home, prisoners should not be allowed to remain in Italy, but be sent on rapidly to fight in Libya and Macedonia.

== Public attitudes towards returning prisoners ==
Upon their return home, the prisoners were met with general disinterest both from the press and from public institutions: imprisonment was regarded as dishonourable, suspicious, and something to be forgotten. Uniquely among the Allies, Italy held no welcoming celebrations for their returning prisoners of war.

The military press did not cover them; they did not figure in post-war debates, in the memoirs of commanders, or in the documentation published by the Army Historical Bureau. Although former prisoners in France had formed a federation to defend their rights, in Italy the expectation was that they were to be forgotten. During the Fascist period with its memorialisation of war heroes, there was no change of attitude towards prisoners of war.
