= Bollettino della Vittoria =

Italian official document about the end of WWI

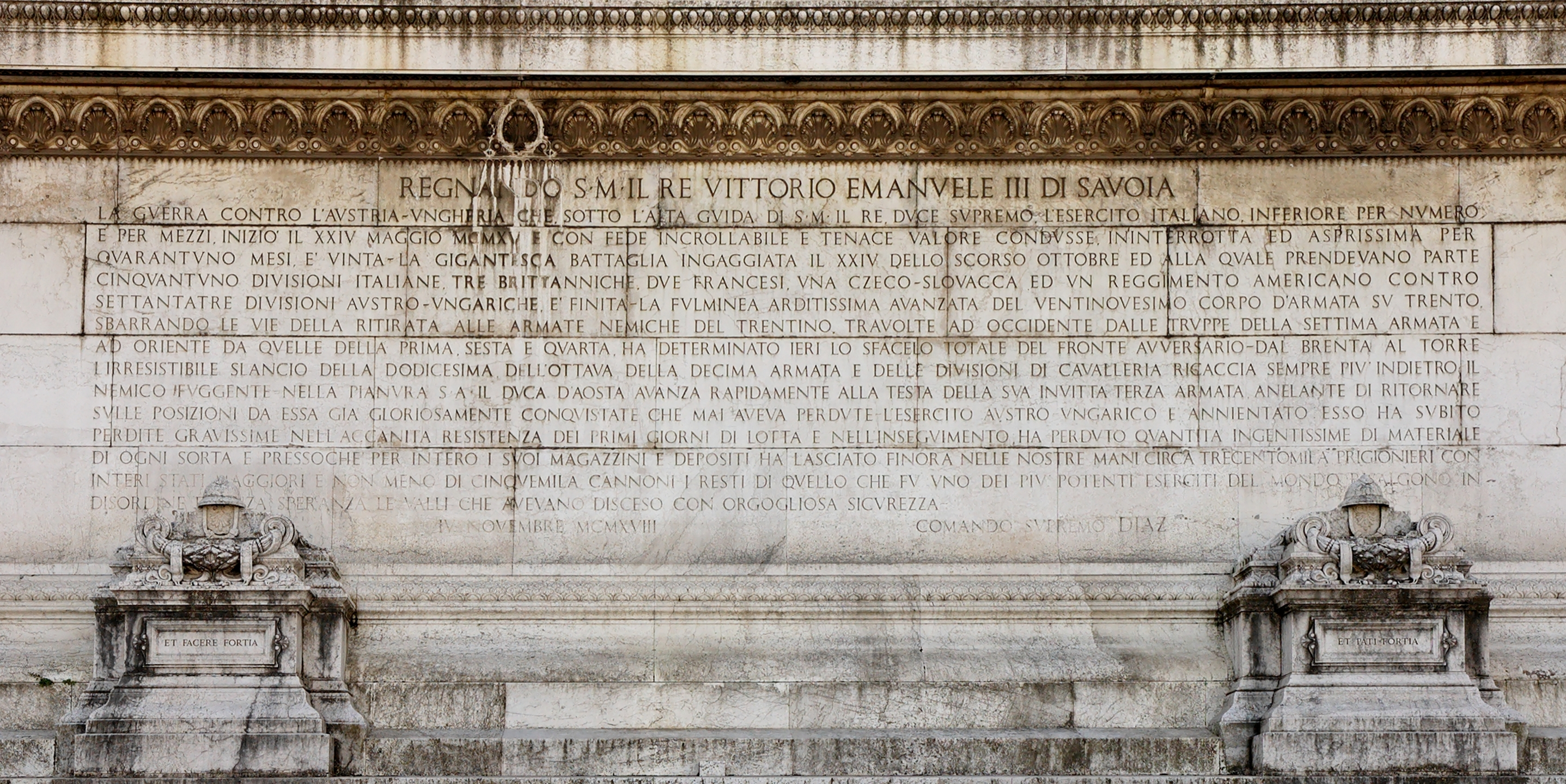
The text of the Bollettino della Vittoria carved on the marble of the Altare della Patria, with the two altars bearing the inscription Et Facere Fortia (left) Et Pati Fortia (right) echoing the Latin phrase et facere et pati fortia Romanum est ('It is the attribute of a Roman to perform as well as to suffer mighty things'.)

The Bollettino della Vittoria is the official document after the Armistice of Villa Giusti with which General Armando Diaz, the supreme commander of the Royal Italian Army, announced, on November 4, 1918, the surrender of the Austro-Hungarian Empire and the victory of the Kingdom of Italy in World War I.

== Legacy ==
Its material author was, in reality, general Domenico Siciliani, head of the press office of the supreme command. Every year, Italian institutions celebrate the event with National Unity and Armed Forces Day on November 4.

The Bollettino della Vittoria, together with the address to the navy by Paolo Thaon di Revel, is a symbol of the Italian victory in World War I. Commemorative plaques with the text are exposed in every town hall and military barracks of Italy that are fused using the bronze of enemy artillery pieces.

A similar bulletin was never drafted for the air forces since they were part of the Aeronautical Service, a department dedicated to Royal Italian Army aircraft: the Royal Italian Air Force, the third armed force of the Kingdom of Italy, was established only in 1923, after the end of the war.

== Text ==
=== Italian ===
Comando Supremo, 4 Novembre 1918, ore 12

La guerra contro l'Austria-Ungheria che, sotto l'alta guida di S.M. il Re, duce supremo, l'Esercito Italiano, inferiore per numero e per mezzi, iniziò il 24 maggio 1915 e con fede incrollabile e tenace valore condusse ininterrotta ed asprissima per 41 mesi, è vinta.

La gigantesca battaglia ingaggiata il 24 dello scorso ottobre ed alla quale prendevano parte cinquantuno divisioni italiane, tre britanniche, due francesi, una cecoslovacca ed un reggimento americano, contro settantatré divisioni austroungariche, è finita.

La fulminea e arditissima avanzata del XXIX Corpo d'Armata su Trento, sbarrando le vie della ritirata alle armate nemiche del Trentino, travolte ad occidente dalle truppe della VII armata e ad oriente da quelle della I, VI e IV, ha determinato ieri lo sfacelo totale del fronte avversario. Dal Brenta al Torre l'irresistibile slancio della XII, della VIII, della X armata e delle divisioni di cavalleria, ricaccia sempre più indietro il nemico fuggente.

Nella pianura, S.A.R. il Duca d'Aosta avanza rapidamente alla testa della sua invitta III armata, anelante di ritornare sulle posizioni da essa già vittoriosamente conquistate, che mai aveva perdute.

L'Esercito Austro-Ungarico è annientato: esso ha subito perdite gravissime nell'accanita resistenza dei primi giorni e nell'inseguimento ha perdute quantità ingentissime di materiale di ogni sorta e pressoché per intero i suoi magazzini e i depositi. Ha lasciato finora nelle nostre mani circa trecentomila prigionieri con interi stati maggiori e non meno di cinquemila cannoni.

I resti di quello che fu uno dei più potenti eserciti del mondo risalgono in disordine e senza speranza le valli che avevano disceso con orgogliosa sicurezza.

Il capo di stato maggiore dell'esercito, il generale Diaz

=== English ===
From the Supreme Headquarters 12:00 hours, November 4, 1918

The war against Austria-Hungary, which the Italian Army, inferior in number and equipment, began on 24 May 1915 under the leadership of His Majesty and supreme leader the King and conducted with unwavering faith and tenacious bravery without rest for 41 months, is won.

The gigantic battle, which opened on the 24th of last October and in which fifty-one Italian divisions, three British, two French, one Czechoslovak and a US regiment joined against seventy-three Austrian divisions, has now been concluded.

The lightning-fast and most audacious advance of the XXIX Army Corps on Trento, blocking the retreat of the enemy armies from Trentino, as they were overwhelmed from the west by the troops of the 8th Army and from the east by those of the I, VI, and the IV Armies, led to the utter collapse of the enemy's front. From the Brenta to the Torre, the fleeing enemy is pushed ever further back by the irresistible onslaught of the XII, VIII, X Armies and of the cavalry divisions.

In the plains, His Royal Highness the Duke of Aosta is advancing at the head of his undefeated III Army, eager to return to the previously successfully conquered positions, which they had never lost.

The Austro-Hungarian Army is now vanquished: it suffered terrible losses in the dogged resistance of the early days, and during the pursuit it lost an enormous quantity of materials of every kind as well as almost all its stockpiles and supply depots. The Austro-Hungarian Army has so far left about 300,000 prisoners of war in our hands along with entire general staffs and at least 5,000 pieces of artillery.

The remnants of what was one of the world's most powerful armies are returning in hopelessness and chaos up the valleys from which they had descended with boastful confidence.

Chief of Staff of the Army, General Diaz

== See also ==
- Bollettino della Vittoria Navale
