= Armando Diaz =

Italian general (1861–1928)

Maresciallo d'Italia Duke of Victory Armando Diaz OSSA OSML OMS OCI
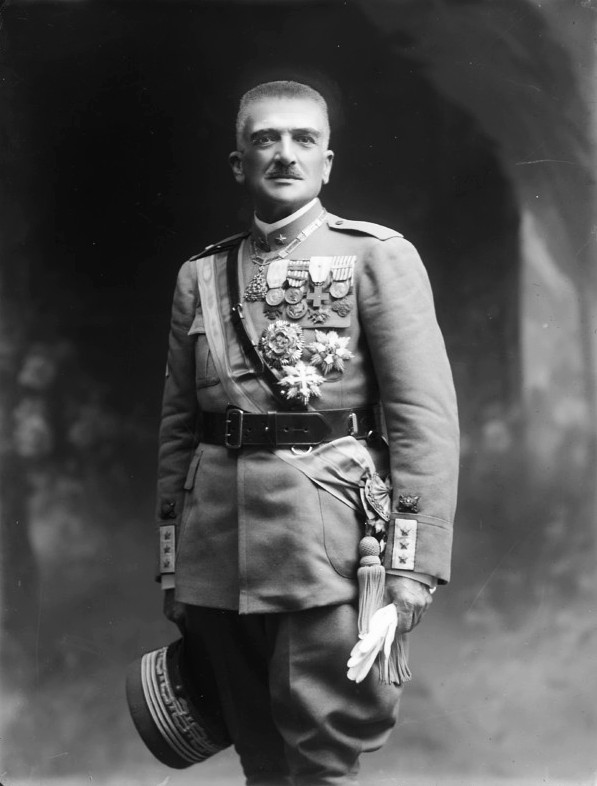

Minister of War
- In office 30 October 1922 – 30 April 1924
- Prime Minister: Benito Mussolini
- Preceded by: Marcello Soleri
- Succeeded by: Antonino Di Giorgio

Chief of Staff of the Royal Italian Army
- In office 9 November 1917 – 13 August 1919
- Preceded by: Luigi Cadorna
- Succeeded by: Pietro Badoglio

Personal details
- Born: 5 December 1861 Naples, Kingdom of Italy
- Died: 28 February 1928 (aged 66) Rome, Kingdom of Italy
- Spouse: Sarah De Rosa-Mirabelli (m. 1895; died 1928)
- Profession: Military officer
- Awards: see below

Military service
- Allegiance: Kingdom of Italy
- Branch/service: Royal Italian Army
- Years of service: 1884–1924
- Rank: Marshal of Italy; General
- Unit: 49th Division of XXIII Corps
- Battles/wars: Italo-Turkish War: Battle of Zanzur; World War I: First Battle of Monte Grappa; First Battle of the Piave River; Second Battle of the Piave River; Battle of Vittorio Veneto; Battle of Monte Corno

Armando Diaz, 1st Duke della Vittoria, OSSA, OSML, OMS, OCI (5 December 1861 – 28 February 1928) was an Italian general and a Marshal of Italy. He is mostly known for his role as Chief of Staff of the Regio Esercito during World War I from November 1917. He managed to stop the Austro-Hungarian advance along the Piave River in the First Battle of Monte Grappa. In June 1918, he led the Italian forces to a major victory at the Second Battle of the Piave River. A few months later, he achieved a decisive victory in the Battle of Vittorio Veneto, which ended the war on the Italian Front. He is celebrated as one of the greatest generals of the war.

== Biography ==
=== Early life ===
Born in Naples to a family of Italian and some distant Spanish heritage (most likely dating back to the years of the Crown of Aragon), he was the son of Lodovico, a navy officer, and Irene Cecconi, the daughter of a minor noble. Diaz began his military career as a cadet at the Military College of Naples. He subsequently moved on to the Military College of Turin, where he graduated as an artillery officer in 1884. Personally, Diaz was described by a contemporary journalist who saw him at 56 as "medium build, of dark complexion, with black hair turning gray and a slight cast in the eye.... His character as a soldier was that of an inflexible disciplinarian who applied to himself the same rules as he enforced on others. In the daily routine of military life, evenly poised, and in the face of danger, characteristically calm".

=== Pre-war ===
He was first assigned to the 10th Field Artillery Regiment. In 1890, with his promotion to captain, he was moved to the 1st Artillery. In 1894, he attended the School of War and ended the courses ranking first in his class. Then, he moved into the Army Staff and worked in the office of General Alberto Pollio for two years.

In 1899, he received a promotion to infantry major and, for a year and a half, commanded a battalion of the 26th Infantry Regiment.

He reached the rank of lieutenant colonel in 1905 and served as Chief of Staff in Florence's Military Division. In 1910, as a colonel, he served in the Italo-Turkish War, commanding the 21st Infantry and, when it lost its commander, the 93rd Infantry. During his Libyan service, he was injured at Zanzur in 1912.

=== First World War ===
On the outbreak of World War I, Diaz was assigned to the high command as head of the unit's operations, under General Luigi Cadorna. Promoted to two-star general in June 1916, he assumed the command of the 49th division and then the 23rd Army Corps.

The Battle of Caporetto, in October 1917, was disastrous to the army, and on 8 November 1917, Diaz was called to succeed the harsh and incompetent Cadorna as chief of general staff by 9 November. Having recovered what remained of the army, he organised the resistance in 1917 on the Monte Grappa massif and along the Piave River, which successfully halted the Austro-Hungarian offensive in the First Battle of Monte Grappa. In the summer of 1918, he oversaw the victory in the Battle of the Piave River, and later that year, he led the 1.4 million Italian troops in the Battle of Vittorio Veneto, which ended the war on the Italian front. With his famous Bollettino della Vittoria (Victory Address), he communicated the rout of the Austro-Hungarian army and the victory of the Italians in the war.

=== Post-war ===
On 1 November 1921, Diaz was in Kansas City to attend the groundbreaking ceremony for the Liberty Memorial, which was being constructed there. Also present that day were Lieutenant General Baron Jacques of Belgium, Admiral David Beatty of Great Britain, Marshal Ferdinand Foch of France, and General John J. Pershing of the United States. One of the main speakers was US Vice President Calvin Coolidge. In 1935, bas-reliefs of Jacques, Foch, Diaz, and Pershing by sculptor Walker Hancock were added to the memorial. Also, during his visit to the United States in 1921, General Diaz toured New Orleans where he planted a ceremonial, live oak tree in Audubon Park and was honoured by the city during that visit which named a street after him. General Diaz St. is located in Lakeview, New Orleans.

After the war, Diaz was appointed as a senator. In 1921, he was ennobled by King Victor Emmanuel III and given the victory title of 1st Duca della Vittoria ("Duke of the Victory"). Benito Mussolini named him Minister of War, and upon retirement in 1924, he was given the honour of Marshal of Italy (Maresciallo d'Italia).

He died in Rome in 1928 and was buried in the church of Santa Maria degli Angeli e dei Martiri. Admiral Paolo Thaon di Revel was interred next to Diaz upon his death in 1948.

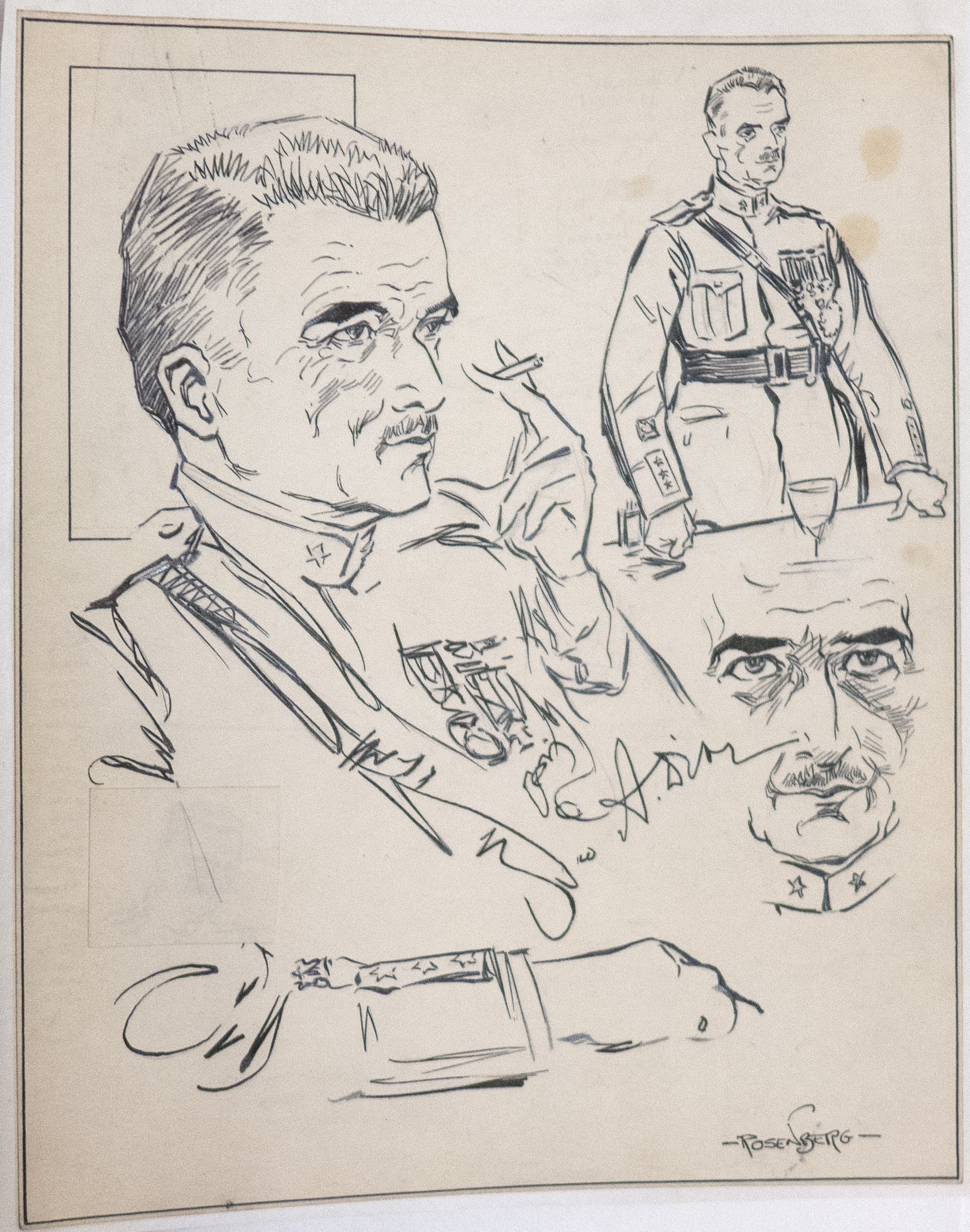
General Armando Diaz 60th birthday – signed drawings by Manuel Rosenberg for the Cincinnati Post, 6 Dec., 1921

== Honours and awards ==
- Knight of the Supreme Order of the Most Holy Annunciation (1919)
- Knight Grand Cross with Grand Cordon of the Order of Saints Maurice and Lazarus
- Knight Grand Cross of the Military Order of Savoy ("Who, having assumed the office of chief of the army in a very difficult war situation, with shrewd work of organization and shrewd effective control line, always highly inspired by the interests of the country, was able to obtain this level of preparation moral and military troops to successfully overcome the ordeal of a great battle engaged by enemy forces and means imposing", 26 June 1918)
- Silver Medal of Military Valor
- War Merit Cross, twice
- Commemorative Medal for the Italo-Turkish War
- Commemorative Medal for the Italo-Austrian War 1915–18 (4 years of campaign)
- Commemorative Medal for the Unification of Italy
- Commemorative Medal for the Italian Victory
- Bailiff Grand Cross of Honour and Devotion of the Sovereign Military Order of Malta
- Médaille militaire (France)
- Distinguished Service Medal (United States)
- Croix de guerre 1914–1918 (France)
- Croix de guerre 1914–1918 (Belgium)
- Commanders Cross of the Order of Virtuti Militari (Poland)
- During a five-hour tour of Providence, Rhode Island on 9 December 1921 Diaz was honoured with a reception by the governor and mayor; received the Key to the City of Providence; and was bestowed Honorary Degrees by Brown University and Providence College

According to the Italian historiographer Aldo Mola, the membership of Diaz to the Freemasonry is reasonably probable, but not demonstrated with certainty.

== See also ==
- Italian cruiser Armando Diaz
