= Martin Engelien =

German guitarist and record producer

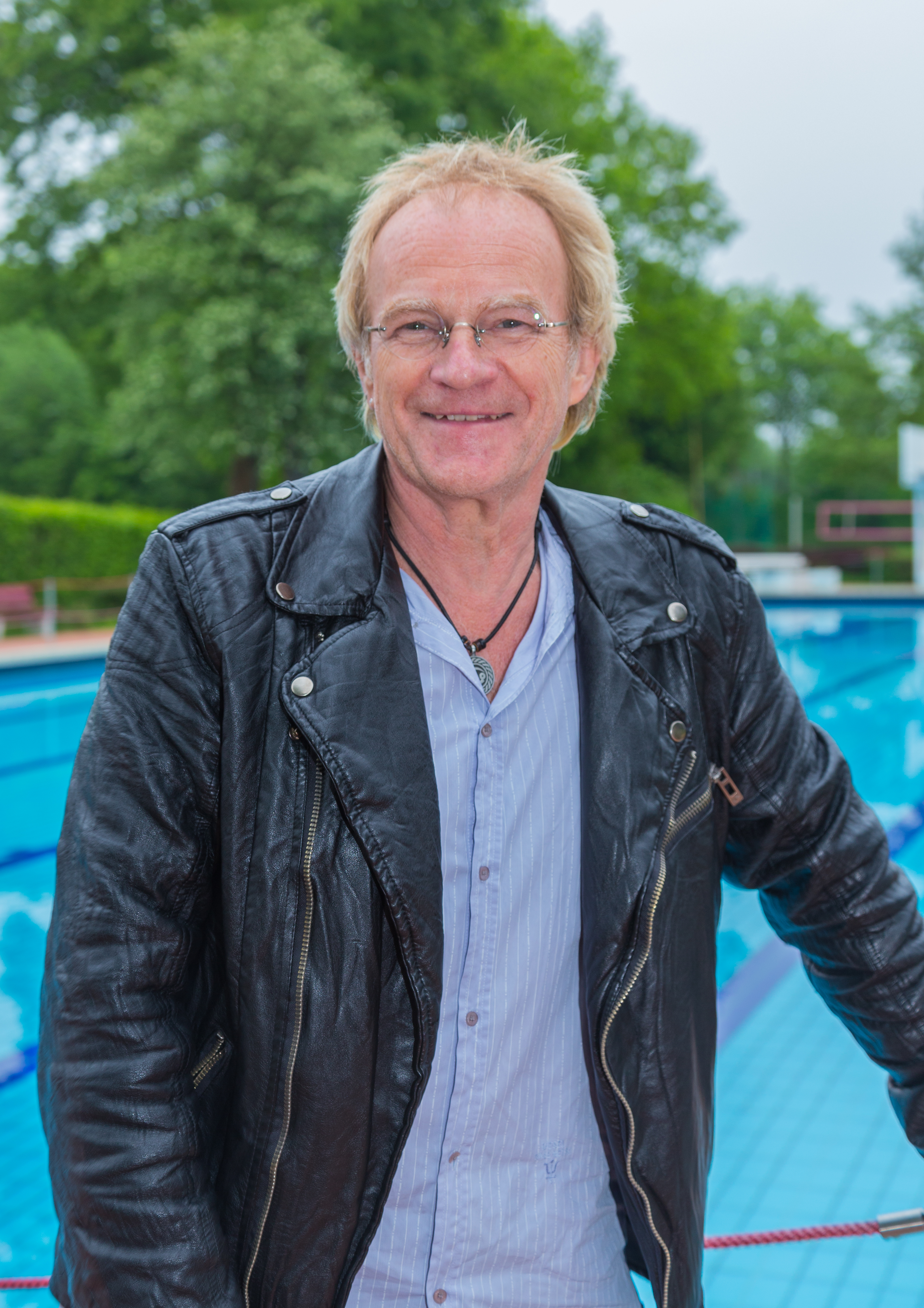
Martin Engelien (2016)

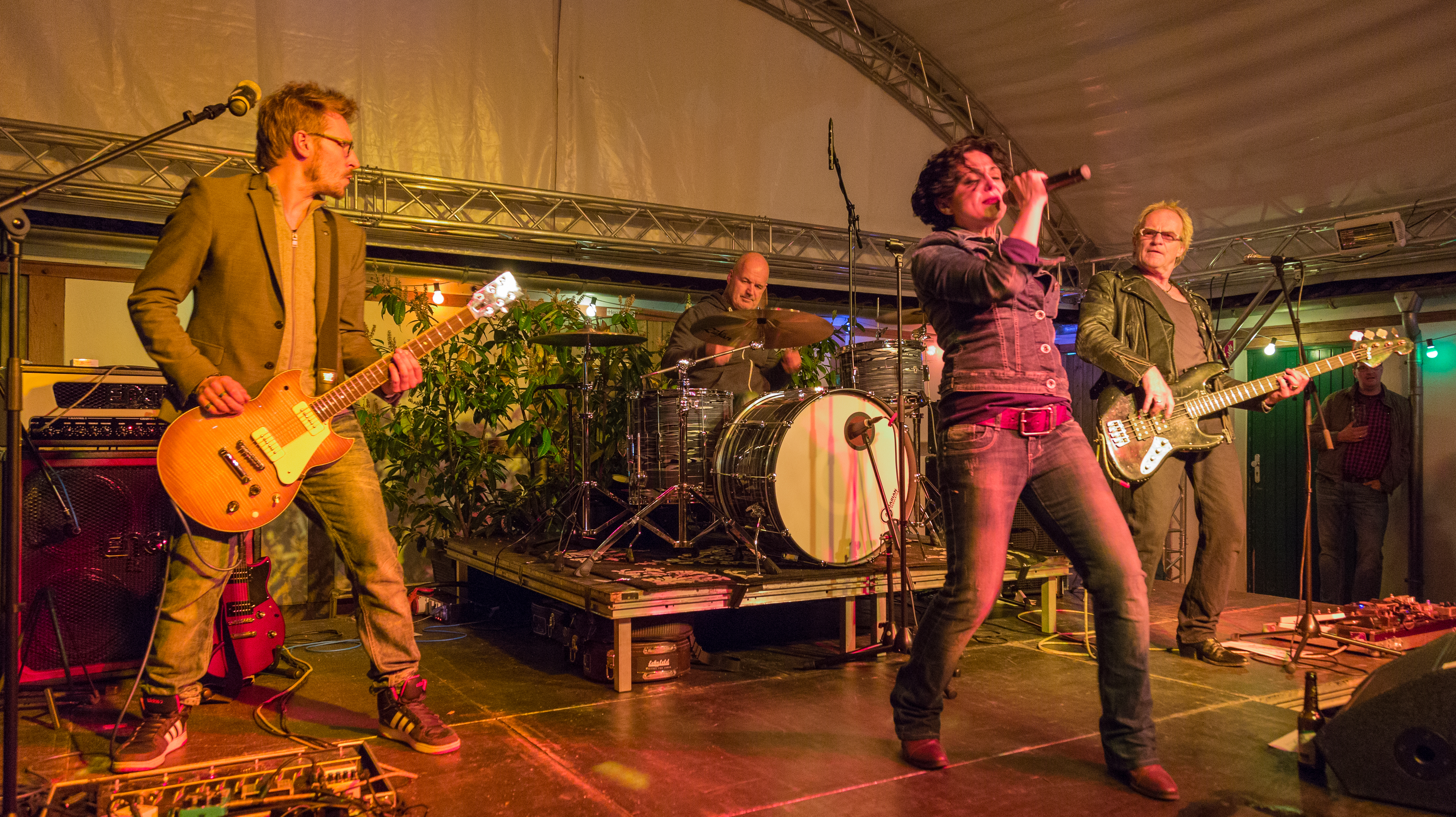
Martin Engelien (right) at a concert of the "Go Music 20th Anniversary Jubilee Tour" 2016 in Laggenbeck on stage with Bühne mit Dennis Hormes (left), Berni Bovens and Sylvia González Bolívar.

Martin Engelien (born in Steele, Essen, Germany) is a German bass guitarist and music producer who became known through recording the song 1000 und 1 Nacht (1984) with Klaus Lage.

== Early life and education ==
Engelien grew up in his birthplace Steele, where his parents ran the Engelien shoe store at Isinger Tor. He attended the high school Carl-Humann-Gymnasium, where he also passed his Abitur. Before co-founding the Klaus Lage Band, Engelien worked with musicians such as Helge Schneider, Thijs van Leer, Toto Blanke, and Peter Bursch Germany's 'National Guitar Teacher'.

== Career ==
In 1983 he was a founding member of the Klaus Lage Band and later became the band's musical director. He also produced some of their albums. The band experienced their musical breakthrough in 1984 with the hit 1000 und 1 Nacht. During his time with Klaus Lage he was awarded a platinum album and three gold records. This was followed by other awards such as "Bassist of the Year", "Band of the Year" or "Song of the Year". Martin Engelien was jointly responsible for the film music of the two "Schimanski" films.

Engelien participated in the entry for Germany in the Eurovision Song Contest 1990 by Kennzeichen D with the song "Wieder zusamm" (Together again) scoring 8th place

Engelien produced CDs, conducted band coaching seminars and played annually at the Musikmesse in Frankfurt the international exhibition for the music industry. He was a permanent lecturer at the Remscheid Summer Academy for ten years. From 1984 to 1995 Martin Engelien was endorser for Warwick basses. From 1991 to 1995 he was product manager and chief developer of the Warwick bass amplifier program. In 2001 he founded the A1 Records label and the Flower Town Music publishing house. From 2002 to 2007 he was a product advisor and bass clinician for audio equipment manufacturer Behringer, and then switched to Marshall. Since March 2008 he has been an endorser for Music-Man basses.

== Discography (selection) ==
- 1979 Pop Nachwuchs Festival '78 Sophisty Various - (Double album) DL 28210
- 1980 Full Score Noctett - Cain CL 5804 1980
- 1980 Sophisty Virgin's Dream - ELM Music ELM 001
- 1984 Schweissperlen Klaus Lage Band - EMI Electrola
- 1984 1000 Und 1 Nacht (Zoom!) Klaus Lage Band - 1000 Und 1 Nacht (Zoom!) (7", Single) 1C 006 1469037
- 1985 Heisse Spuren Klaus Lage Band - EMI
- 1986 Mit Meinen Augen Klaus Lage Band - Mit Meinen Augen • Lage Live, EMI
- 1987 Amtlich! Klaus Lage Band - EMI Electrola CDP 566-7 48224 2
- 1987 C'est La Vie Oder Was with Danny Deutschmark, Emi 066 14 7221 1, 1C 066 14 7221 1
- 1988 Listen And Lay Back with Albert Mangelsdorff & Members Of Klaus Lage Band, BackDino Music
- 1989 Rauhe Bilder Klaus Lage & Members,
- 1990 Rooty Toot with Albert Mangelsdorff & Members Of Klaus Lage Band - Dino Music, Crownhill
- 1993Live - The Very Human Factor Albert Mangelsdorff & Members, Muffin Records CDMR 007
- 1994 Crosstalk Muffin Records
- 1988 Space 'N' Base Men In Space, Cadet Records EFA 15 302-2
- 2000 Boomparty 2000 Operator (Bonus Track) The Boombasstics, Groove Box Records
- 2009 Unterwegs Benedicita and 7 more... Crazy Chris Kramer, Blow Till Midnight Records BM09C302
- 2015 In Phase Gregor Hilden - Acoustic Music Records 319.1534.2
- 2018 Das Grosse Go Music Weihnachtskonzert 2018 Martin Engelien - A1 Records A1-1901
- 2020 Hope A1 Records A1-2005

== Publications ==
- "Electric Bass Basics" (2008) a textbook, Voggenreiter Verlag, Bonn. ISBN 978-3-8024-0644-7
