= Assassination attempts on Benito Mussolini =

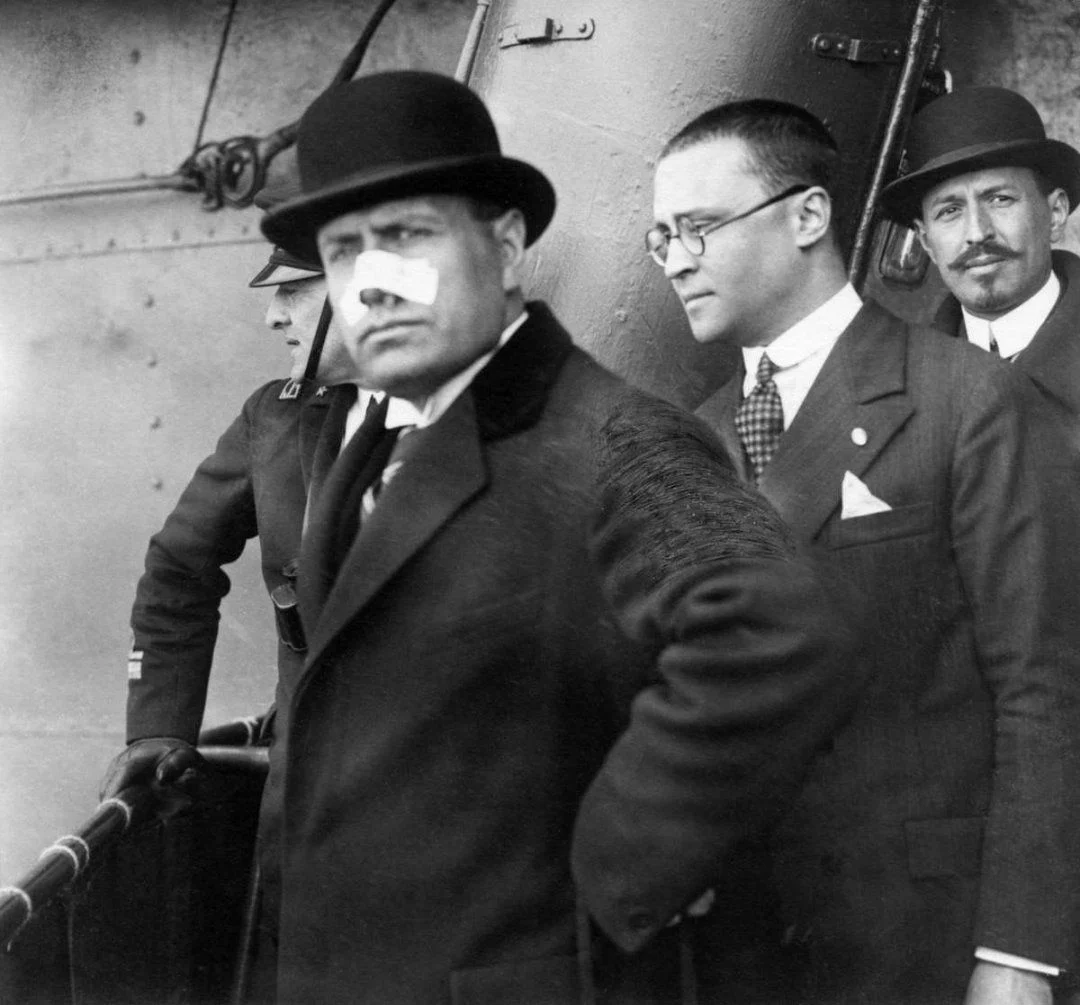
Mussolini in 1926 after the assassination attempt by Violet Gibson.

Italian Fascist leader Benito Mussolini survived several assassination attempts while head of government of Italy in the 1920s and 1930s.

== Tito Zaniboni ==
The former Socialist deputy Tito Zaniboni was arrested for attempting to assassinate Mussolini on November 4, 1925. In a hotel with a view onto Palazzo Chigi, where Mussolini had planned to give a balcony speech, Zaniboni set up a rifle with telescopic sights. Shortly before his target appeared, however, Zaniboni was arrested. A friend and double agent had informed the police. Historians believe that the plot itself was engineered by the Mussolini administration as a pretext to consolidate power, which is what followed. Mussolini's laws enacted in late 1925 enabled the suppression of any oppositional political organization.

The Italian army officer Luigi Capello was arrested in conjunction with the Zaniboni plot and received a 30-year prison sentence. The author and labor organizer Carlo Tresca wrote a play and political satire in late 1925 based on the attempt, L'Attentato a Mussolini ovvero il segreto di Pulcinella (The Attempt on Mussolini or the Secret of Pulcinella).

Zaniboni received a 30-year prison sentence, but was released in 1943 after the King dismissed Mussolini as prime minister, and was later named to government positions.

== Violet Gibson ==
The next year, on April 7, 1926, Violet Gibson shot a pistol at Mussolini, which grazed his nose. He was bandaged and continued on to give his scheduled speech. Gibson, the daughter of the Irish Lord Chancellor, was nearly lynched, later jailed, and spent the remainder of her life in a British asylum.

== Gino Lucetti ==
On September 11, 1926, anarchist marble worker Gino Lucetti threw a bomb at Mussolini's limousine in Porta Pia, Rome, which injured four others.

== Anteo Zamboni ==
The next month, on October 31, 1926, a shot fired at Mussolini, who rode in an open car through Bologna, led to the lynching of a 15-year-old boy, Anteo Zamboni. Terrorism specialist J. Bowyer Bell wrote that the boy was likely innocent and the affair either a put-up job or plot between Fascists. The attempt resulted in laws creating Mussolini's secret police.

The attempt has been adapted into two films: the 1977 film Gli ultimi tre giorni (The Last Three Days) and the fictionalized 1973 film Love and Anarchy. A street in Bologna is named after Zamboni.

== 1930s plots ==
As Italian Fascism became a stable institution, the potential murder of Mussolini became harder to attempt and offered less potential impact to destabilize his regime. In May 1931, American anarchist Michele Schirru was arrested and executed in Italy for plotting to kill Mussolini. The next year, Angelo Sbardellotto was arrested and executed for a similar plot.

== Gallery of would-be assassins ==
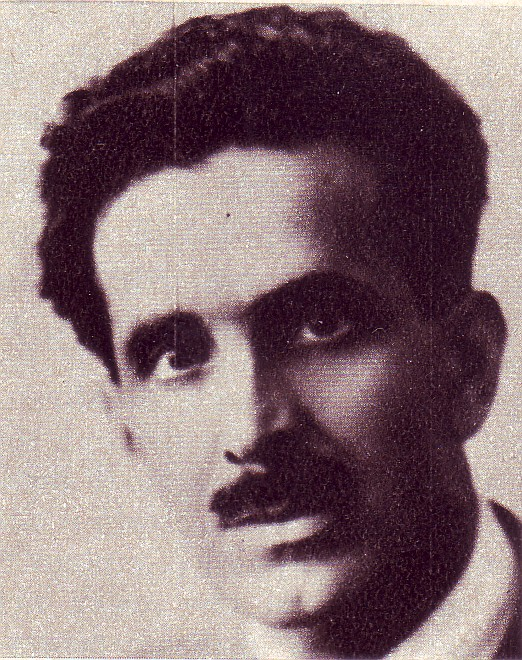
Tito Zaniboni

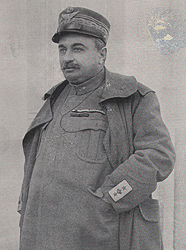
Luigi Capello

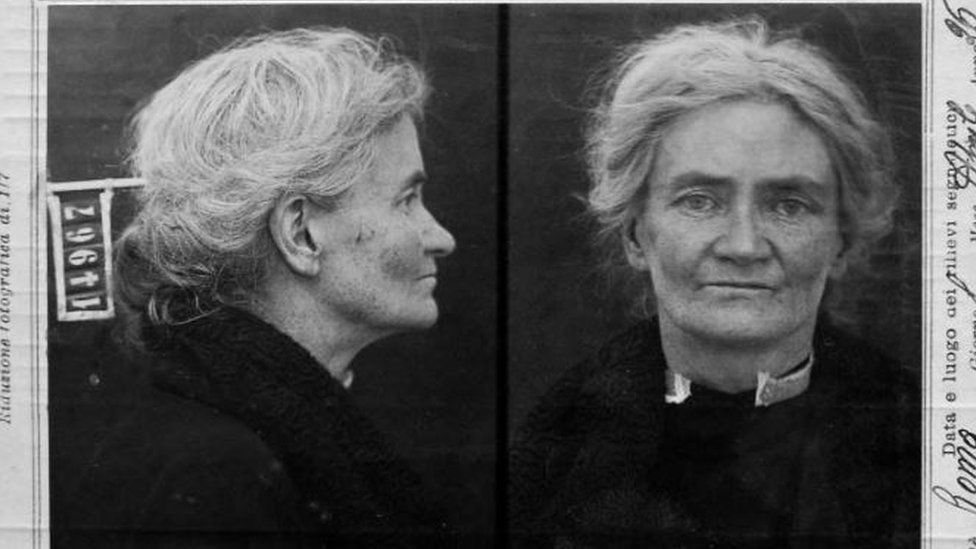
Violet Gibson

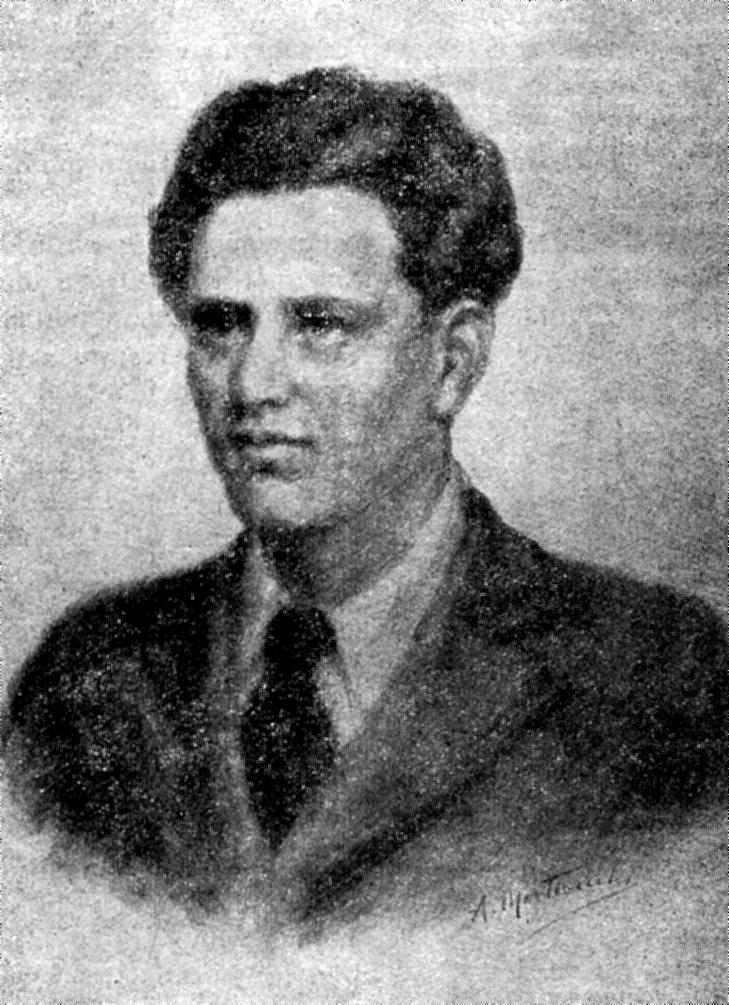
Gino Lucetti

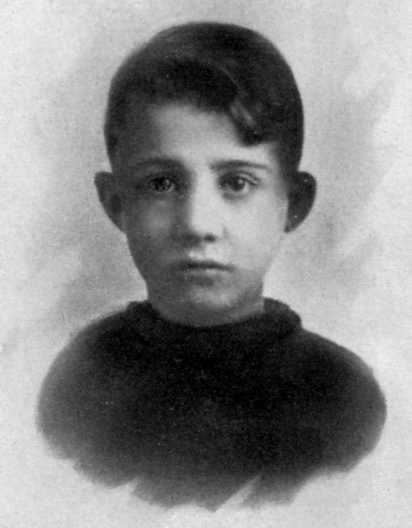
Anteo Zamboni

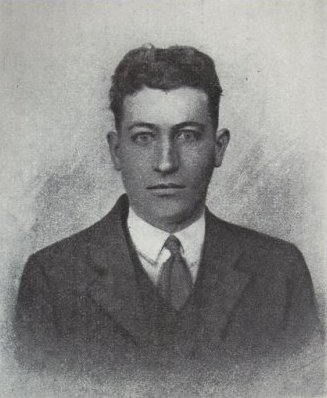
Michele Schirru

Angelo Pellegrino Sbardellotto
