= Battle of Caporetto =

1917 battle on the Italian front of World War I

Coordinates: 46°12′52″N 13°38′33″E

- Part of the Battles of the Isonzo (World War I)
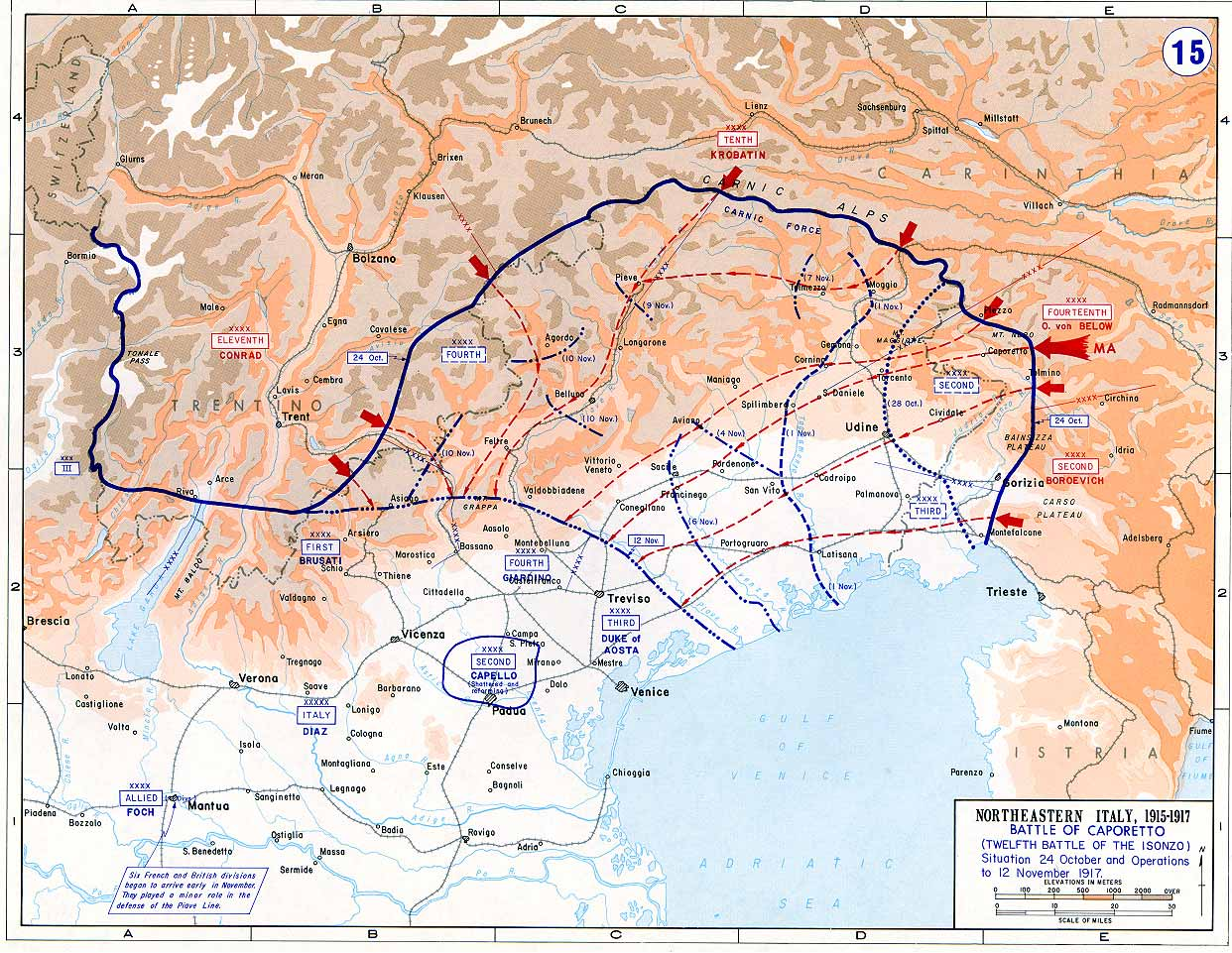
- Battle of Caporetto and Italian retreat
Date	24 October – 19 November 1917
Location	Kobarid, Austria-Hungary (present day Slovenia)
Result	Central Powers victory
Territorial changes	Central Powers advance 150 kilometres (93 mi) to the Piave River

Belligerents
Austria-Hungary; Germany; Bavaria	Italy

Commanders and leaders
(Austria-Hungary) Archduke Eugen; (German Empire) Otto von Below; (Austria-Hungary) Svetozar Boroević	(Kingdom of Italy) Luigi Cadorna; (Kingdom of Italy) Luigi Capello

Units involved
(German Empire) (Austria-Hungary) 14th Army; (Austria-Hungary) 5th Army	(Kingdom of Italy) 2nd Army

Strength
353,000 personnel; 2,518 artillery pieces	257,400 personnel; 1,342 artillery pieces

Casualties and losses
70,000	13,000 dead; 30,000 wounded; 265,000–275,000 captured; 300,000 stragglers; 50,000 deserters; 3,152 artillery pieces; 1,712 mortars; 3,000 machine guns; 300,000 rifles
- 600,000 internally displaced people

The Battle of Caporetto (also known as the Twelfth Battle of the Isonzo, the Battle of Kobarid or the Battle of Karfreit) took place on the Isonzo front of World War I.

The battle was fought between the Kingdom of Italy and the Central Powers and took place from 24 October to 19 November 1917, near the town of Kobarid (now in north-western Slovenia, then part of the Austrian Littoral), and near the river Isonzo. The battle was named after the Italian name of the town (also known as Karfreit in German).

Austro-Hungarian forces, reinforced by German units, were able to break into the Italian front line and rout the Italian forces opposing them. The battle was a demonstration of the effectiveness of the use of stormtroopers and the infiltration tactics developed in part by Oskar von Hutier. The use of poison gas by the Germans also played a key role in the collapse of the Italian Second Army.

The rest of the Italian Army retreated 150 kilometres (93 mi) to the Piave River; its effective strength declined from 1,800,000 troops down to 1,000,000 and the government of Prime Minister Paolo Boselli collapsed.

== Prelude ==
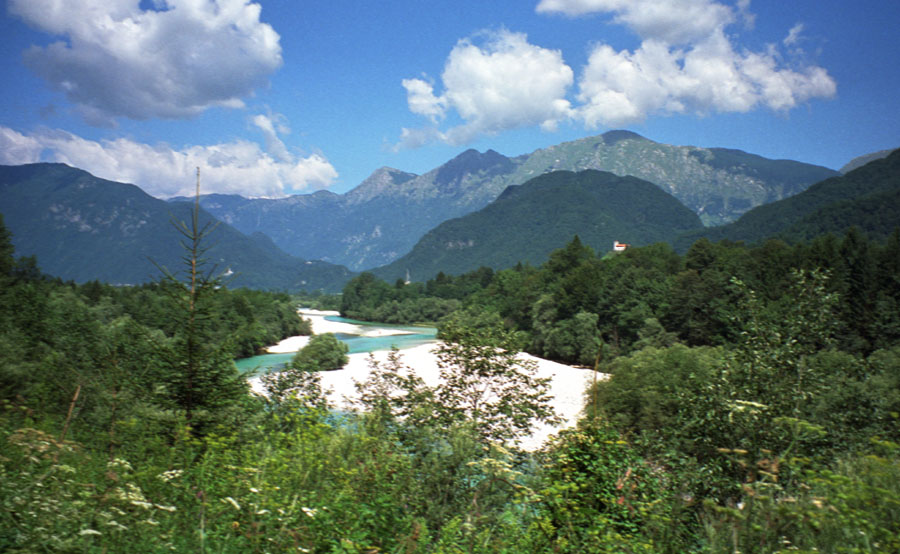
The Soča (Isonzo) River, location of the initial attacks at Kobarid (Caporetto)

Throughout the spring and summer of 1917, the Italians had launched numerous offensives on the Austro-Hungarian Lines in the Isonzo Sector, with the 11th Battle of the Isonzo being the most successful in pushing back the Austro-Hungarians. After the Italian success in the 11th Battle of the Isonzo, Emperor Karl knew a breakthrough was going to happen at any moment, as both the Austro-Hungarians and Italians were exhausted, and running out of men to sustain the war. So, he wrote to Kaiser Wilhelm II and requested that German forces be deployed to Italy.

In August 1917 Paul von Hindenburg and Arthur Arz von Straußenburg decided to send troops from the Eastern Front to the Isonzo Sector. Erich Ludendorff was opposed to this but was overruled. Later, in September three experts from the Imperial General Staff, led by the chemist Otto Hahn, went to the Isonzo front to find a site suitable for a gas attack. They proposed attacking the quiet Caporetto sector, where a good road ran west through a mountain valley to the Venetian Plain. The Germans also sent Lieutenant General Konrad Krafft von Dellmensingen, an expert in mountain warfare, to reconnoitre the ground.

The Austro-Hungarian Army Group Boroević, commanded by Svetozar Boroević, was prepared for the offensive. In addition, a new 14th Army was formed with nine Austrian and six to eight German divisions, which were commanded by the German Otto von Below. The German divisions were Ludendorff's general reserve. Lieutenant Colonel Georg Wetzell, Ludendorff's strategic adviser, advised Ludendorff to use the German divisions to attack a weakpoint in the Italian line. The Italians inadvertently helped by providing weather information over their radio.

The German and Austro-Hungarian battle plan was to use Otto von Below's German divisions, which would be guided by Konrad Krafft to attack a part of the Julian Alps which was near the northeastern corner of the Venetian salient. Meanwhile, Svetozar's Austro-Hungarian army would attack the eastern end of the salient and a stretch of ground near the Adriatic shore.

The buildup of German and Austro-Hungarian military forces in the region was noticed by Italian air reconnaissance.

== Battle ==
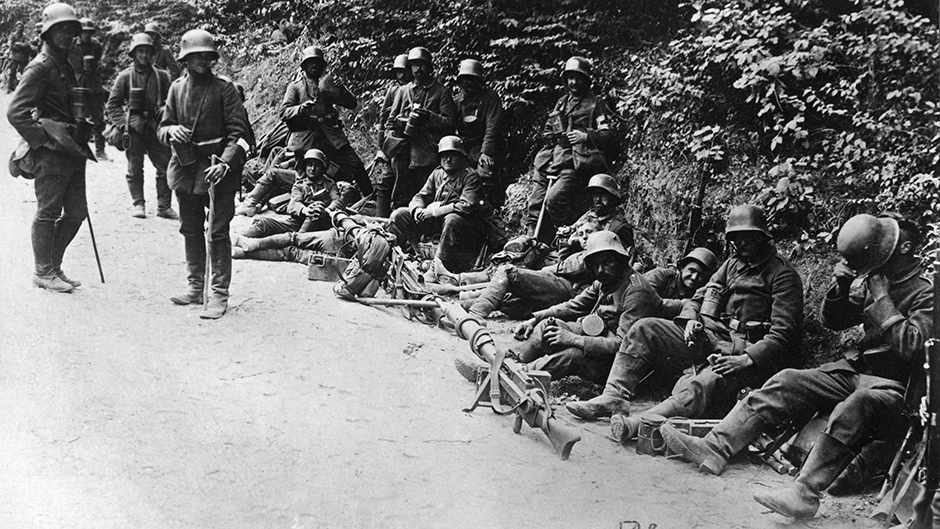
German assault troops at Caporetto

Foul weather, as well as lack of readiness in some of the Austro-Hungarian divisions and in particular of their artillery, delayed the attack for two days but on 24 October there was no wind and the front was misted over. At 02:00, in the northern area of the battle (near Bovec/Plezzo) 894 metal tubes similar to Livens Projectors (Gaswurfminen), dug into a reverse slope, were triggered electrically to simultaneously fire canisters containing 600 ml (21 imp fl oz; 20 US fl oz) of chlorine–arsenic agent and diphosgene, smothering the Italian trenches in a dense cloud of poison gas. Knowing that their gas masks could protect them only for two hours or less, the defenders fled, but 500–600 were killed. Other parts of the valley were bombed with gas from common grenades. Then the front was quiet until 06:00, when all the Italian wire and trenches to be attacked were bombarded by mortars.

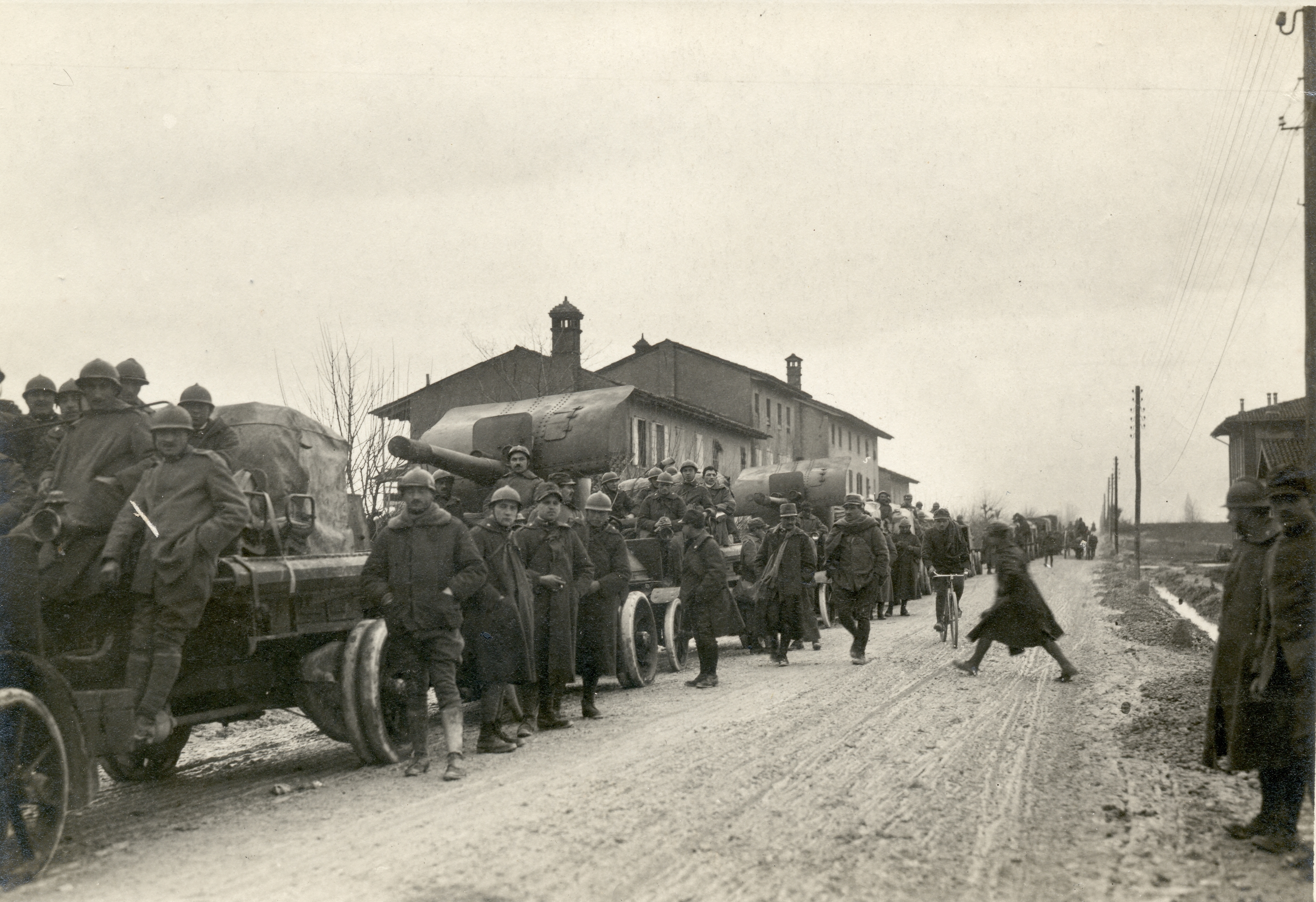
Italian 102/35 anti-air guns mounted on SPA 9000C trucks during the retreat

At 06:41, 2,200 guns opened fire, many targeting the valley road along which reserves were advancing to plug the gap. At 08:00 two large mines were detonated under strong points on the heights bordering the valley and the infantry attacked. Soon they penetrated the almost undefended Italian fortifications in the valley, breaching the defensive line of the Italian Second Army between the IV and XXVII Corps. To protect the attackers' flanks, Alpine Troops infiltrated the strong points and batteries along the crests of the adjoining ridges, Matajur and Kolovrat, laying out their telephone lines as they advanced to maintain contact with their artillery. Specially-trained and equipped stormtrooper units led attacks, making use of the new German model 08/15 Maxim light machine gun, light trench mortars, mountain guns, flamethrowers and hand grenades.

The attackers in the valley marched almost unopposed along the excellent road toward Italy; some advanced 25 kilometres (16 mi) on the first day. The Italian army beat back the attackers on either side of the sector where the central column attacked, but von Below's successful central penetration threw the entire Italian army into disarray. Forces had to be moved along the Italian front in an attempt to stem von Below's breakout, but this only weakened other points along the line and invited further attacks. At this point, the entire Italian position was threatened.

The Italian 2nd Army commander Luigi Capello was bedridden with fever. Recognizing that his forces were ill-prepared for this attack and were being routed, Capello requested permission to withdraw to the Tagliamento River. Cadorna, who believed the Italian force could regroup and hold out, denied the request. Finally, on 30 October 1917, Cadorna ordered the majority of the Italian force to retreat to the other side of the Tagliamento. It took the Italians four full days to cross the river, and by this time the German and Austro-Hungarian armies were on their heels, ambushing the defenders whenever they could. These ambushes would become known as the Battle of Pozzuolo. Eventually, the retreating Italian soldiers were able to break through the Austro-German encirclement and retreat to the Tagliamento. Then, on 2 November, after an attack by Captain Emil Redl's 4th Battalion of the 4th Bosnian Infantry Regiment, the 55th Infantry Division (Austria-Hungary) established a bridgehead across the Tagliamento River. About this time, however, the rapid success of the attack caught up with them. The German and Austro-Hungarian supply lines were stretched to the breaking point and unable to launch another attack to isolate a part of the Italian army against the Adriatic. Cadorna was able to retreat further and by 10 November had established a position on the Piave River and Monte Grappa.

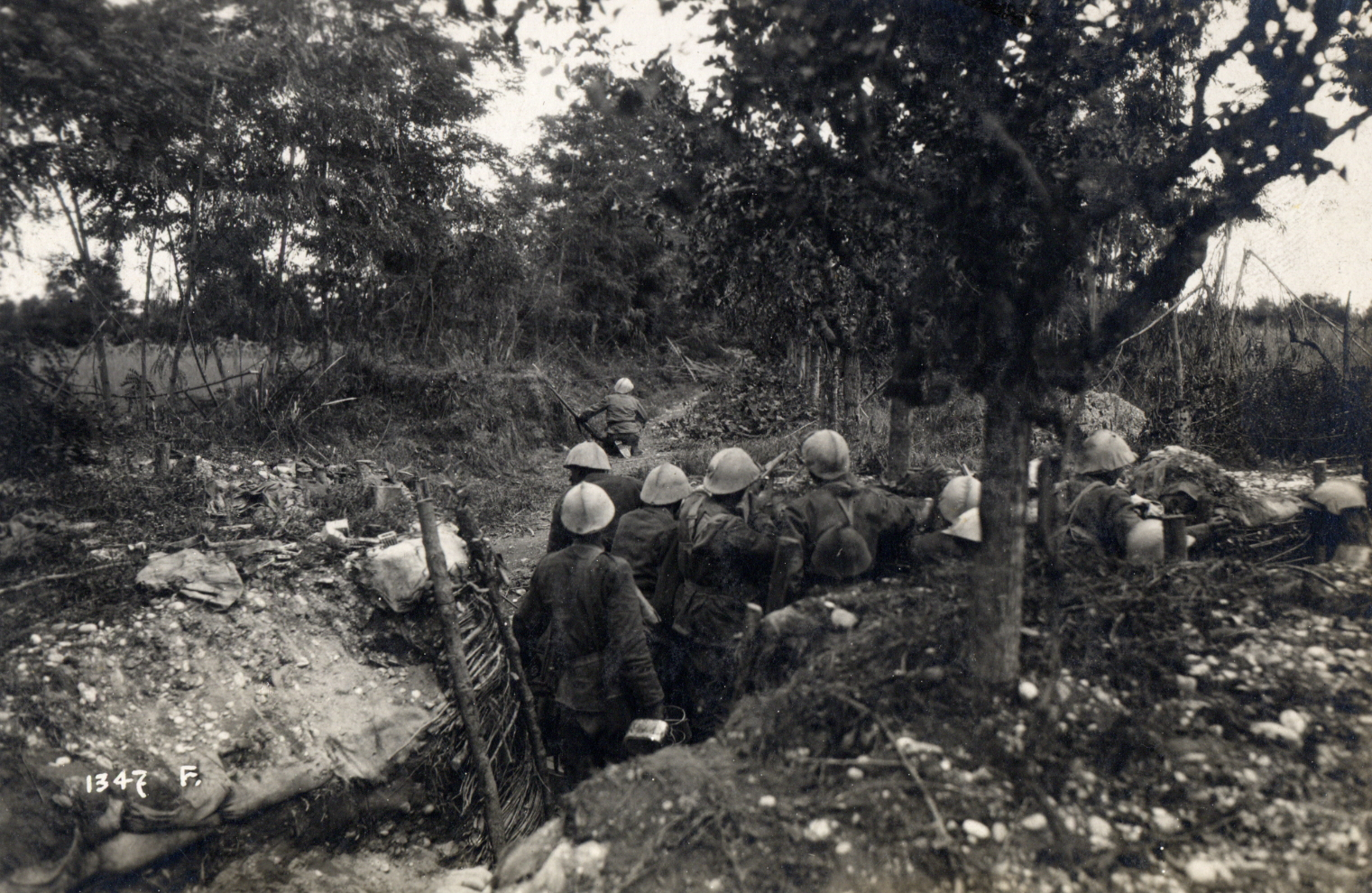
Provisional Italian trenches along the Piave River

Even before the battle, Germany was struggling to feed and supply its armies in the field. Erwin Rommel, who as a junior officer won the Pour le Mérite for his accomplishments in the battle, often bemoaned the demands placed upon his "poorly fed troops". The Allied blockade of the German Empire, which the Kaiserliche Marine had been unable to break, had led to food shortages and widespread malnutrition in Germany and the Central Powers in general. The inadequate provisioning, as well as the grueling night marches preliminary to the Battle of Caporetto, took a toll on the German and Austro-Hungarian forces. Despite these logistical problems, the initial assault was extremely successful. However, as the area controlled by the combined Central Powers forces expanded, an already limited logistical capacity was overstrained. They had advanced more than 100 km (62 mi) in the direction of Venice, but by the time they reached the Piave, the soldiers of the Central Powers were running low on supplies and were feeling the effects of exhaustion. As the Italians began to counter the pressure put on them, the German forces lost momentum and were once again caught up in another round of attrition warfare.

== Aftermath ==
=== Analysis ===
Brian R. Sullivan called Caporetto "the greatest defeat in Italian military history". John R. Schindler wrote: "By any standard, Twelfth Isonzo [Caporetto] and its aftermath represented an unprecedented catastrophe for Italian arms." The disaster "came as a shock" and "triggered a search for scapegoats", culminating in a 1919 Italian military commission that investigated the causes of the debacle.

The collapse of the Isonzo front sparked a hastily called meeting of British, French, and Italian leaders at Rapallo on 5–7 November, to bolster military and political support for the beleaguered Italian government whose forces were still in retreat. Lloyd George saw Caporetto as the latest episode in a year of confusion and cross-purposes in Allied strategy, and used the conference to gain approval of a Supreme War Council to improve military co-operation and develop a common strategy.

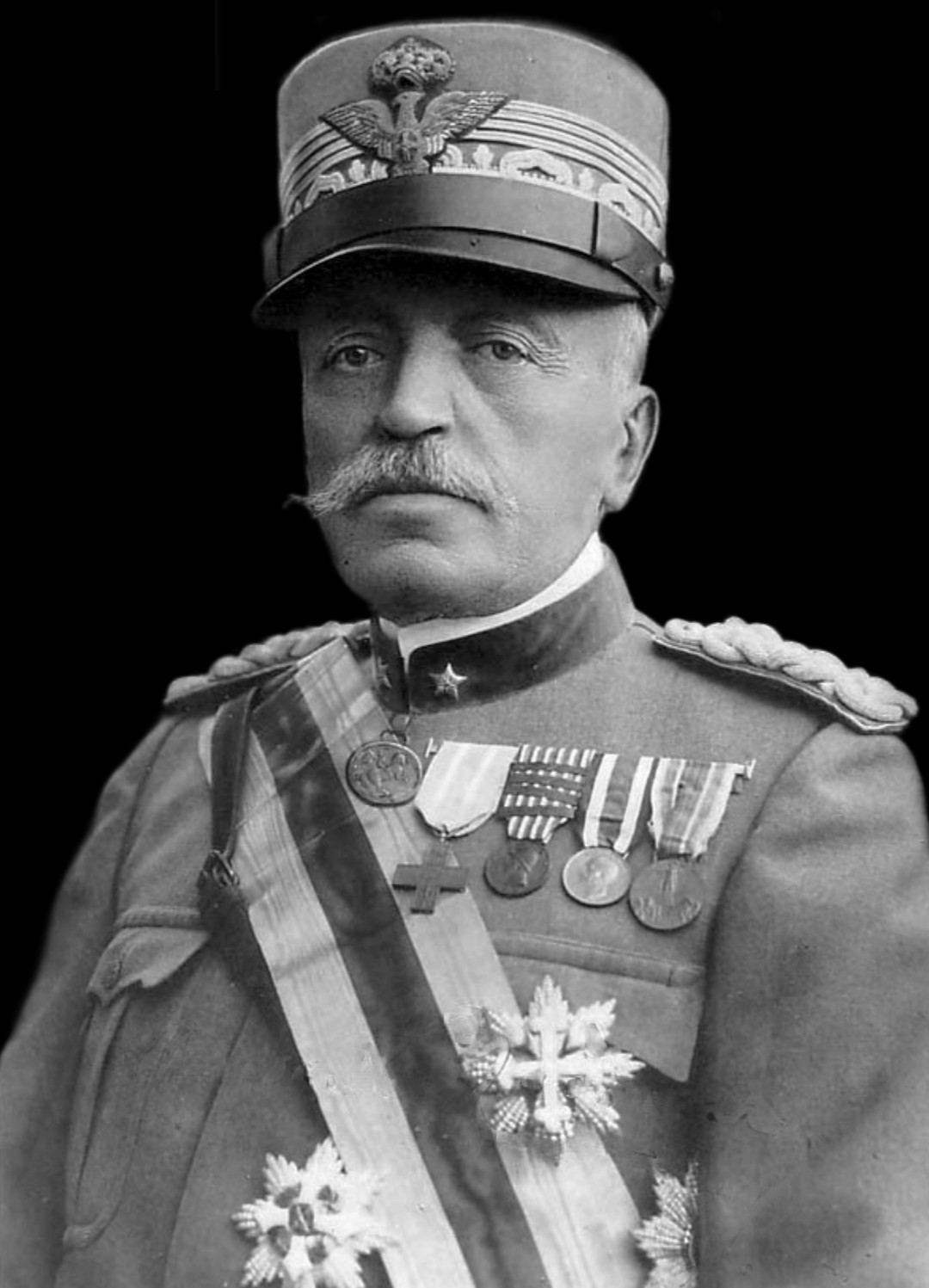
Marshal Luigi Cadorna

Luigi Cadorna was forced to resign after the defeat, a final straw according to the Prime Minister, Vittorio Emanuele Orlando. Cadorna was known to have maintained poor relations with the other generals on his staff and by the start of the battle, had sacked 217 generals, 255 colonels and 355 battalion commanders. In addition, he was detested by his troops as being too harsh. Cadorna had been directing the battle some 30 kilometres (19 mi) behind the front and retreated another 160 km (99 mi) to Padua. Cadorna was replaced by Armando Diaz and Pietro Badoglio, who commanded one of the corps easily overwhelmed by the Germans in the early stages of the battle, but escaped from all charges during the commission hearings. Italian propaganda offices were established, promising land and social justice to soldiers. Italy also accepted a more cautious military strategy from this point on. Diaz concentrated his efforts on rebuilding his shattered forces while taking advantage of the national rejuvenation that had been spurred by invasion and defeat.

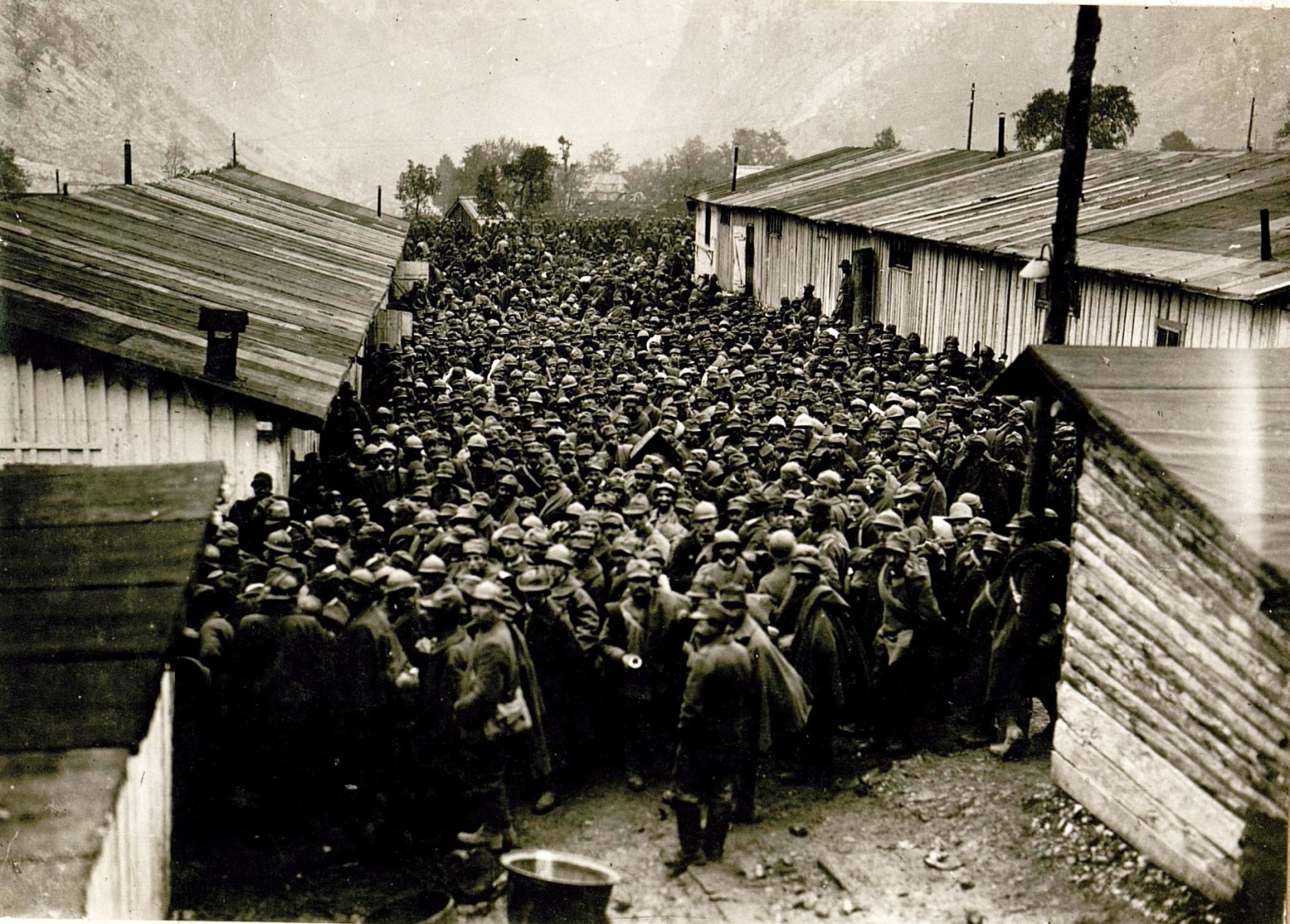
Italian POWs after the battle

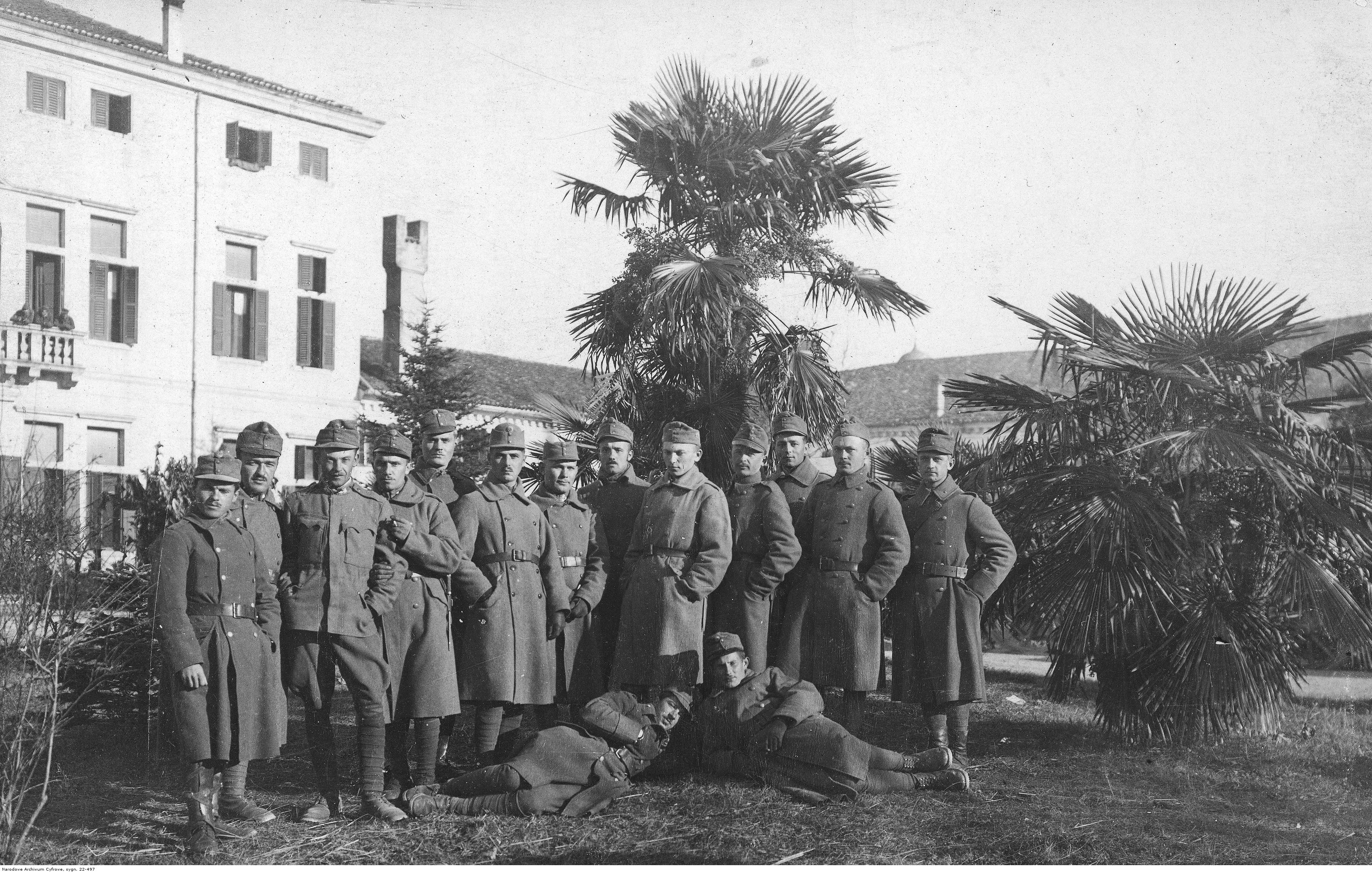
Austro-Hungarian soldiers on the outskirts of Venice, November 29

=== Casualties ===
Italian losses were enormous: 13,000 were killed, 30,000 wounded and 265,000–275,000 were taken prisoner. Morale was so low among the Italian troops, mainly due to Cadorna's harsh disciplinary regime, that most of these surrendered willingly. 3,152 artillery pieces, 3,000 machine guns and 1,712 mortars were lost, along with a vast amount of stores and equipment. (Note: An additional 350,000 troops were temporarily separated from units before rejoining them, mostly at the Piave line.) In contrast, the Austro-Hungarians and Germans sustained around 70,000 casualties. (Note: By 10 November Italian losses were 10,000 dead, 30,000 wounded, and 265,000 prisoners (about 350,000 stragglers from the Second Army did manage to reach the Piave line). The army had also lost 3,152 artillery pieces of a pre-offensive total of 6,918. An additional 1,712 heavy trench mortars and 3,000 machine guns had been captured or abandoned in the retreat, along with vast amounts of other military equipment, especially as the rapid withdrawal had prevented the removal of heavy weapons and equipment across the Isonzo River. In contrast, the attackers had sustained about 70,000 casualties.Tucker, Spencer C.; Roberts, Priscilla Mary (2005). World War I: A Student Encyclopedia. United States: ABC-CLIO. p. 431. ISBN 1851098798.)

=== Subsequent operations ===
Six French and five British infantry divisions as well as sizeable air contingents were quickly dispatched to Italy in the early days of the battle, but played no role in it. British and French strategists deployed them on the Mincio River, some 97 kilometres (60 mi) behind the Piave, which they believed could not be held.

The last push of Austro-Hungarian and German forces from 15 November to 23 December was met and repelled by the Italians at the First Battle of Monte Grappa, which secured the Italian positions south of the Piave. When the Austrians launched an offensive across the entire front in June 1918, their bridgeheads were contained and were ultimately forced back across the river. On the anniversary of Caporetto, the Piave line served as springboard for the final Italian offensive, the Battle of Vittorio Veneto, in which the Austro-Hungarian army was defeated after eleven days and an armistice signed on 3 November.

== Legacy ==
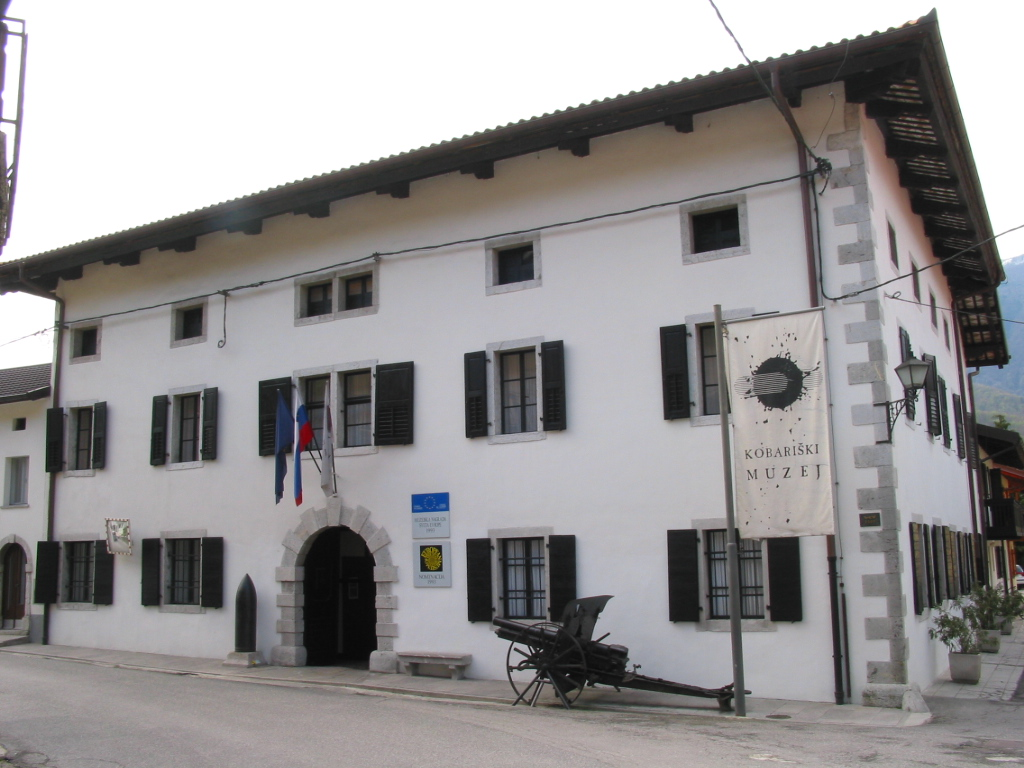
The Museum of the Isonzo Front in Kobarid, Slovenia

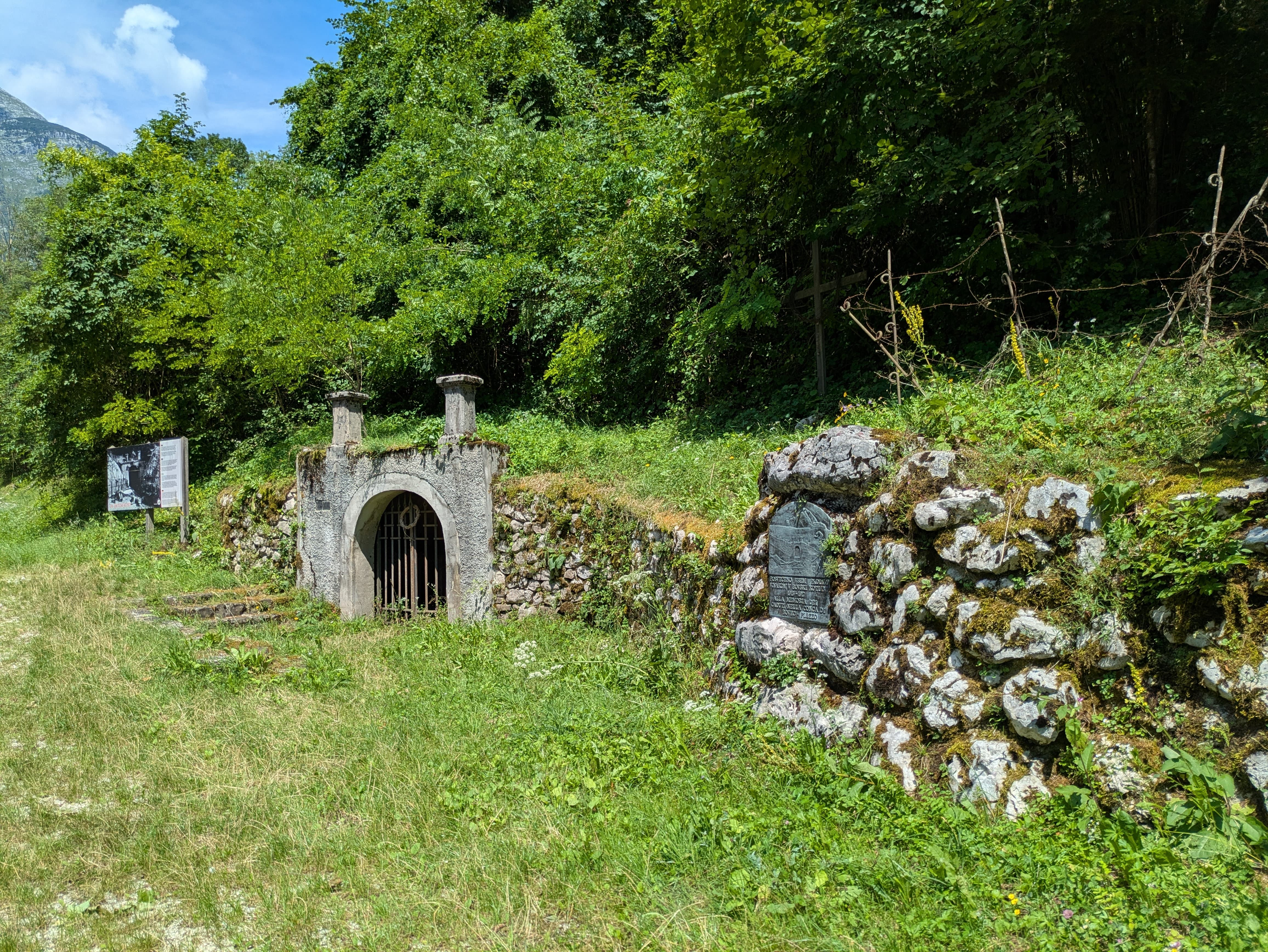
Bovec, memorial site in Naklo Gorge to gas attack of 24 October 1917

Opera Nazionale Combattenti, an Italian charitable organization, was set up in December 1917 in the immediate aftermath of the battle, to provide assistance to veterans of the First World War; it was closed in 1977.

After the battle, the term "Caporetto" gained a particular resonance in Italy. It is used to denote a terrible defeat – the failed General Strike of 1922 by the socialists was referred to by Mussolini as the "Caporetto of Italian Socialism". Many years after the war, Caporetto was still being used to destroy the credibility of the liberal state.

The Battle of Caporetto has been the subject of a number of books. British writer and military historian Cyril Falls's one volume The Battle of Caporetto is an operational and tactical account of the battle as the centerpiece of the larger campaign in northeastern Italy. Infanterie greift an (Infantry Attacks), an interwar memoir and military handbook written by the future German field marshal Erwin Rommel, features the actions of then lieutenant Rommel and units he led during the battle, providing insight into "stormtrooper" tactics. The Swedish author Christian Braw (under the pen name F. J. Nordsted) wrote about the battle in his novel Caporetto. The bloody aftermath of Caporetto was vividly described by Ernest Hemingway in his novel A Farewell to Arms. Curzio Malaparte wrote an excoriation of the battle in his first book, La rivolta dei santi maledetti, published in 1921. It was censored by the state and suppressed; it was finally published in 1980. The battle also features prominently in the novel Questa storia by Alessandro Baricco.

Today, a museum in the town of Kobarid is dedicated to the Isonzo Battles in general, and the Caporetto Battle in particular.

== See also ==
- Italian prisoners of war in World War I
- Battles of the Isonzo – overview
  - Eleventh Battle of the Isonzo – 19 August – 12 September 1917

== Sources ==
- Andreopoulos, George J.; Selesky, Harold E. (1994). The Aftermath of Defeat: Societies, Armed Forces, and the Challenge of Recovery. Yale University Press. ISBN 978-1852851668.
- Cassar, George H. (1998). The Forgotten Front: The British Campaign in Italy 1917–18. A&C Black. ISBN 978-0300058536.
- Clodfelter, Micheal (2017). Warfare and Armed Conflicts: A Statistical Encyclopedia of Casualty and Other Figures, 1492–2015 (4th ed.). Jefferson, North Carolina: McFarland. ISBN 978-0786474707.
- Dupuy, R. E.; Dupuy, T. N. (1970). The Encyclopaedia of Military History: From 3,500 BC to the Present. sbn 356-02998-0 (rev. ed.). London: Jane's.
- Gooch, John (2014). The Italian Army and the First World War. Cambridge: Cambridge University Press. ISBN 978-0521149372.
- Schindler, John R. (2001). Isonzo: The Forgotten Sacrifice of the Great War. Greenwood. ISBN 978-0275972042.
- Seth, Ronald (1965). Caporetto: The Scapegoat Battle. London: Macdonald. OCLC 1407385.
- Tucker, Spencer (2010). Battles That Changed History: An Encyclopedia of World Conflict. ABC-CLIO. ISBN 978-1598844290.
- Stevenson, David (2017). 1917 War, Peace and Revolution. Oxford University Press. ISBN 9780191006760.
