= Tito Zaniboni =

Italian politician and attempted assassin (1883–1960)

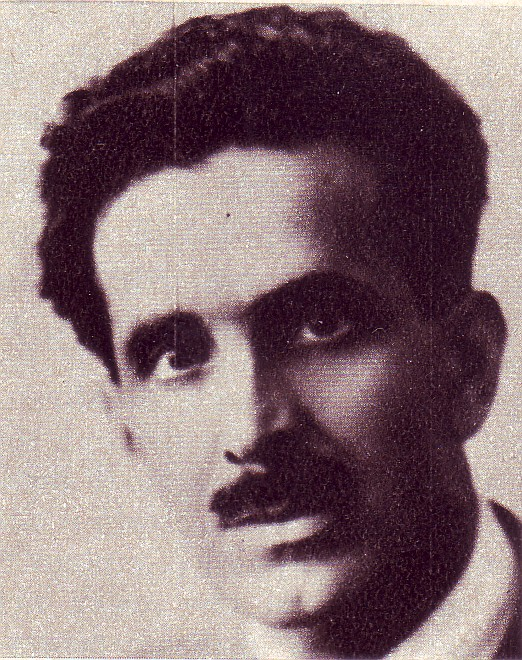
- Zaniboni in 1925

Mayor of Manzambano
- In office 1920–1921

Personal details
- Born: 1 February 1883 Monzambano, Italy
- Died: 9 December 1960 (aged 77) Rome, Italy
- Party: PSI (until 1922); PSU (1922–25)
- Occupation: Politician

Tito Zaniboni (1 February 1883 – 9 December 1960) was an Italian politician. He was best known for carrying out the first assassination attempt on Benito Mussolini on 4 November 1925.

== Life ==
Zaniboni lived in Boston from 1906 to 1908, but decided to do his military service with the 8th Alpine Regiment, which he completed as a second lieutenant in the reserve.

=== Socialist provincial council and military service ===
He was a supporter of the Italian Socialist Party (Partito Socialista Italiano; PSI), or rather its reformist wing. In 1914, he was elected to the provincial council of the Province of Mantua as a representative of the Volta Mantovana constituency. He became secretary of the Italian cooperative association Federazione delle Cooperative in Mantua between 1913 and 1915 and worked for the newspaper Nuova Terra, where he initially wrote against Italy's participation in World War I, but then swung around to support the war effort. During the war, he served again in his old regiment based in Udine, rose to the rank of major and received various awards, eventually becoming a tenente colonnello.

=== Brief sympathy for fascism ===
After the war, he initially sympathized with Gabriele D'Annunzio's plans regarding the territorial claims around Fiume and briefly supported the newspaper Il Popolo d'Italia, a paper published by Mussolini in 1914.

=== Mayor of Manzambano (1920) and member of parliament ===
In 1920, he was re-elected as a member of the provincial council and, in the same year, became mayor of Monzambano. He became a Freemason in 1920 and, in the parliamentary elections of 1921, was elected to the Chamber of Deputies in Rome for the Socialists. As a member of parliament, he advocated reconciliation between socialists and fascists and, together with Pietro Ellero and the fascists Giacomo Acerbo and Giovanni Giuriati, was one of the signatories of the Patto di pacificazione (Pacification Pact) of August 3, 1921, which was, however, emphatically rejected shortly afterwards by representatives of the Fascist Party. In 1922, he joined the Unitary Socialist Party (Partito Socialista Unitario; PSU), led by Giacomo Matteotti after the reformists were forced to leave the PSI.

=== Assassination attempt on Mussolini and arrest ===
Matteotti's murder on 10 June 1924, which is considered the beginning of Mussolini's dictatorship, and the discovery of his body on 16 August, turned Zaniboni into an anti-fascist. He planned an assassination attempt on Mussolini for 4 November 1925, using an Austrian rifle. From a window of the Hotel Dragoni, opposite the Palazzo Chigi, he intended to shoot Mussolini as soon as he stepped onto the palace balcony. However, he had told his lover Marisa Romano about his plans, who in turn informed the spy who had been planted among the group who planned the assassination. When Zaniboni entered the hotel to go to his room, he was arrested. His rifle was found in his room and his Lancia Dilambda, which he had intended to use as a getaway car, was found in Piazza San Claudio. According to some sources, the arrest took place two hours before the planned assassination, according to others three hours, but according to his own confession, it was four hours before. He was arrested together with General Luigi Capello, who had no detailed knowledge of the assassination plans.

The fascist regime benefited from the failed assassination attempt. The PSU was dissolved and its newspaper, La Giustizia, was shut down. The law against associations, which was primarily directed against the Freemasons, was passed by parliament without significant opposition.

=== Trial in 1927 ===
On 11 April 1927, the trial for high treason began, but Zaniboni denied having planned an assassination attempt on Mussolini, claiming that his target was Roberto Farinacci, Mussolini's former “right-hand man” who had since been stripped of his power. But then he suddenly confessed.

Zaniboni was sentenced to 25 years in prison for high treason, which he spent until 1943 in Viterbo, Volterra, and Ponza. General Luigi Capello was sentenced to 30 years in prison for complicity. Zaniboni claimed that he had been financially supported by Czechoslovak President Tomáš Masaryk. However, recent research has shown that the funds were intended to finance socialist propaganda, not to prepare for the assassination.

=== Rapprochement with Mussolini and later release from prison by Badoglio ===
In 1935, Zaniboni wrote several letters thanking Mussolini for helping his daughter finance her studies. From prison, he also supported the fundraising campaign for the Second Italo-Ethiopian War. His daughter Bruna likewise thanked Mussolini and dedicated her thesis at the University of Pavia to him.

On 8 September 1943, he was released and asked by Pietro Badoglio to join the government. Zaniboni, who according to contemporary accounts was too exhausted from his imprisonment, declined. In January 1944, the fascists publicly quoted two of Zaniboni's prison letters to Mussolini on the radio in order to discredit him.

=== Role at the end of the war and in the post-war period ===
In February 1944, Badoglio appointed him as High Commissioner for National Purification from Fascism. Badoglio hoped that Mussolini's assassin would help him win over Italy's anti-fascists, even though a law granting Zaniboni the necessary powers was not passed until six weeks after he took office. However, the PSI rejected any form of collaboration with him on 12 February. Zaniboni was officially appointed as High Commissioner on 23 February, but remained without influence. He resigned in mid-May, especially because he still had no defined legal jurisdiction that would have allowed him to prosecute fascists; four weeks earlier, Benedetto Croce, who was interested in actual prosecution, and Badoglio had agreed on a different role for Zaniboni. In Badoglio's second government, Zaniboni was appointed commissioner for refugees and returnees (1945). Benedetto Croce saw him as a man who was not up to the task of dealing with fascism, while Zaniboni described himself as a “cleaner.”

From 1949 to 1960, Zaniboni served as president of the UNUCI, the Unione Nazionale degli Ufficiali in Congedo d'Italia (National Union of Italian Officers on Leave). He died in Rome in 1960. Monzambano, where he had been mayor, named a town square after Zaniboni.

== Literature ==
- Roberto Festorazzi: "Caro Duce ti scrivo". Il lato servile degli antifascisti durante il Ventennio. Edizioni Ares, Milan 2012.
- Giacomo Perticone: Zaniboni, Tito. In: Enciclopedia Italiana, Appendice II, Rome 1949; Appendice III, Rome 196
- Hans Woller: I conti col fascismo. Il Mulino, Bologna 1997.
- Zaniboni, Tito. In: Dizionario di Storia, Rome 2011.
