= Infantry Attacks =

Book by Erwin Rommel

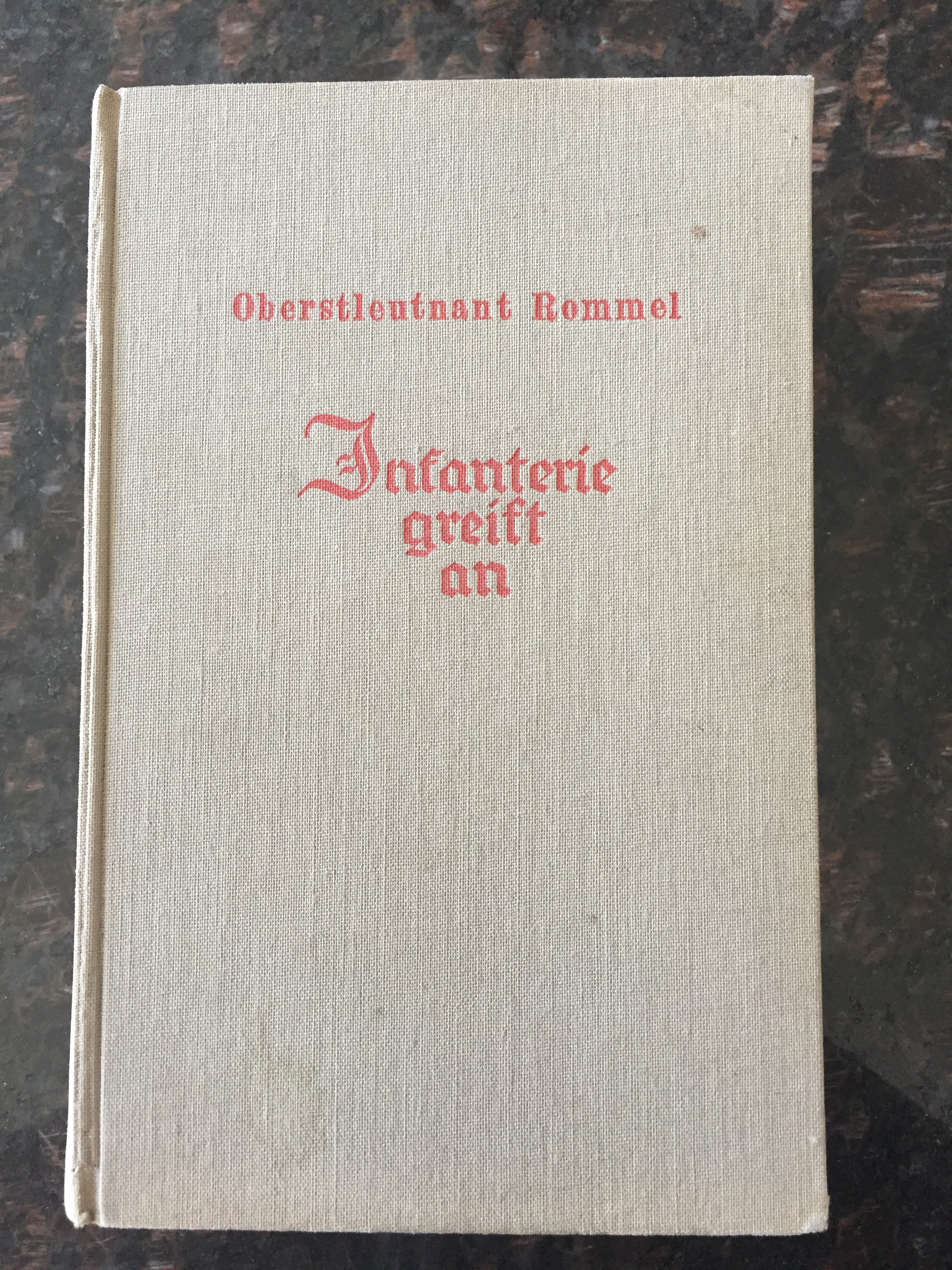
- Author: Erwin Rommel
- Original title: Infanterie greift an
- Language: German
- Publication date: 1937

Infantry Attacks (German: Infanterie greift an) is a classic book on military tactics written by Field Marshal Erwin Rommel. It details his experiences in World War I. It was one of the first books in the series Graue Bücherei (Grey Library). At the time of the book's writing in the mid-1930s, Rommel's rank was lieutenant colonel. Rommel had planned to write a successor called Panzer Greift An (in English: Tank Attacks) about tank warfare, and gathered much material during the North Africa Campaign. However, as a result of his perceived involvement in a failed assassination attempt of Adolf Hitler, he was forced to commit suicide before completing this work.

== Overview ==
Rommel describes his Stoßtruppen (shock troops) tactics, which used speed, deception, and deep penetration into enemy territory to surprise and overwhelm. Throughout the book, Rommel reports assigning small numbers of men to approach enemy lines from the direction in which attack was expected. The men would yell, throw hand grenades and otherwise simulate the anticipated attack from concealment, while attack squads and larger bodies of men sneaked to the flanks and rears of the defenders to take them by surprise. These tactics often intimidated enemies into surrendering, thus avoiding unnecessary exertion, expenditure of ammunition, and risk of injury.

=== Contents ===
The text is divided into six chapters:

- I. Movement War 1914 in Belgium and Northern France
- II. Trench Warfare in the Argonne and High Vosges
- III. Open Warfare in Rumania and the Carpathians, 1917
- IV. Fights in the Southeastern Carpathians, August 1917
- V. Attacking battle at Tolmein 1917
- VI. Pursuit across the Tagliamento and Piave Rivers

== Translations ==
Lieutenant Colonel Gustave E. Kidde published in Infantry Journal(1944) an abridged English translation. This edition was titled Infantry Attacks. ATTACKS published in 1979 and translated by J. R. Driscoll was the first unabridged and complete English language translation published in the United States.

== Impact ==
Infanterie greift an was first published in 1937 and helped persuade Adolf Hitler to give Rommel high command in World War II, although he was not from an old military family or the Prussian aristocracy, which had traditionally dominated the German officer corps. It was printed in Germany until 1945. By then, about 500,000 copies had been published. The book is still in print, and was most recently published in German in 2015.

The book was also used throughout the West as a resource for infantry tactical movements. General George S. Patton was among the many influential military leaders reported to have read Infantry Attacks.

== In popular culture ==
In the 1970 film Patton, when it is clear to Patton that he is defeating forces he believes are commanded by Rommel during a tank battle, Patton says to himself, "Rommel, you magnificent bastard, I read your book!" However, in a previous scene in the film, Patton is awoken by his aides with news that an intercepted German radio message reveals that Rommel will attack Patton near El Guettar, Tunisia. Before this, the camera focuses on a book on Patton's nightstand, The Tank in Attack (Panzer greift an), a book which Rommel had planned to write but never completed.
