= Peter Bursch =

German guitarist and author

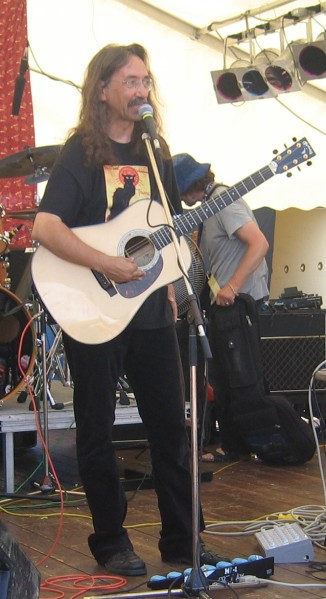
Bursch performing in July 2006

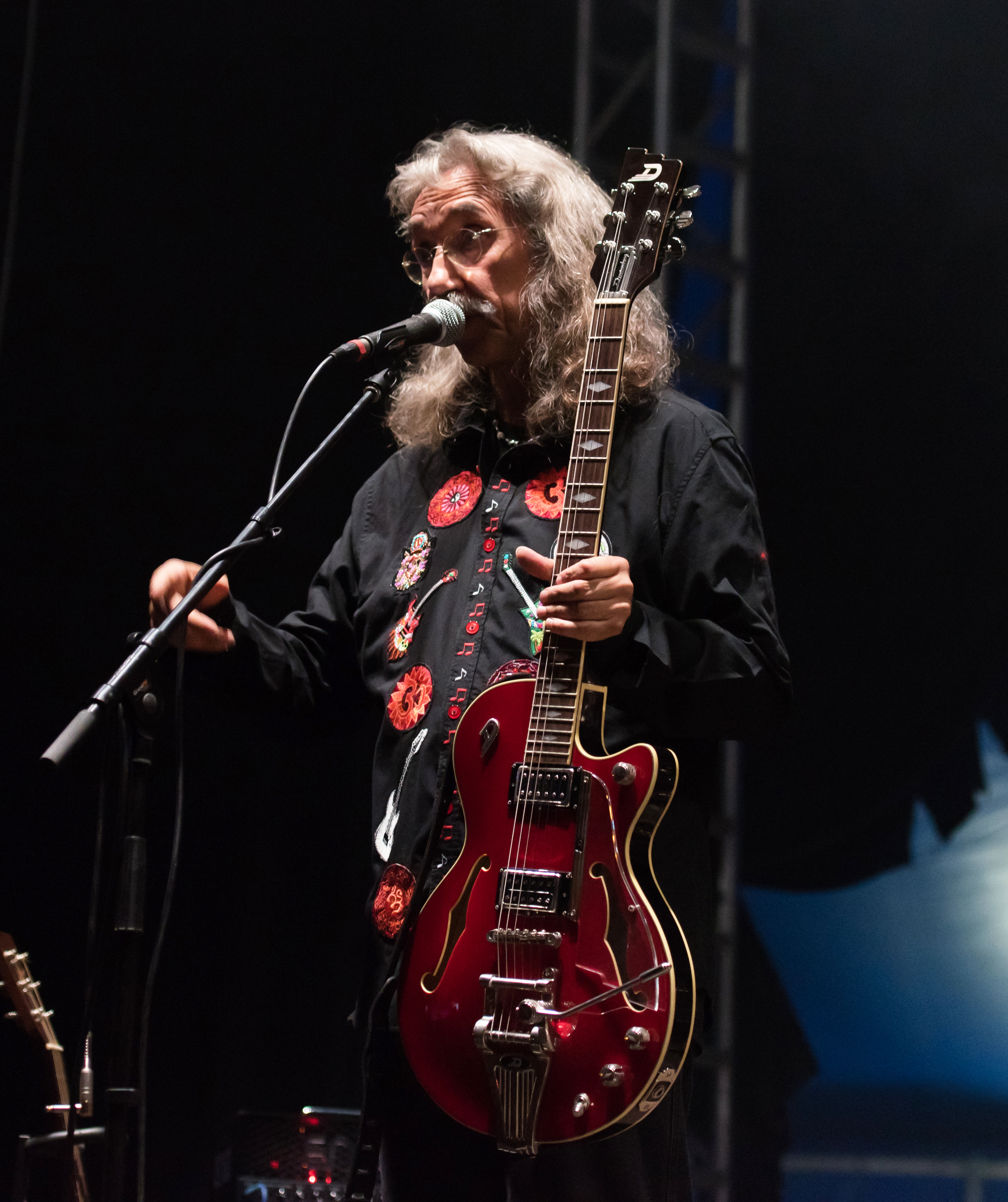
Bursch at Werner Rennen in 2018

Peter Bursch (born 14 April 1949 in Duisburg) is a German guitarist, lecturer, and author of guitar textbooks. Self-taught, he is considered Germany's "guitar teacher of the nation".

Bursch has played and worked together with Jimmy Page, Jeff Beck, and other notable musicians. The guitarists of the band Die Toten Hosen admitted to having acquired their first knowledge of the guitar through books by Bursch and that his arrangements were incorporated into their debut album Opel-Gang.

Bursch plays in his music projects "All Star Band", "Acoustic Nights" and as a studio guitarist with BAP and the Bläck Fööss, among others. His band Bröselmaschine, founded in 1969, dissolved several times and newly formed, has been back on stage with him since 2005. Bursch has been a lecturer at various universities and academies since 1969. In Duisburg he runs a music school in the Duissern district. In addition, he was also active as an author for the political-satirical magazine Der Metzger.

His publishing career began with his 1975 "Guitar Book" which has sold over 2 million copies. His various guitar books and guitar schools offer a low learning curve approach to guitar playing for beginners. With a didactically well thought-out system, learning content is conveyed in sections, mostly on the basis of tablature for self-study.

The US guitar manufacturer C. F. Martin & Company produced a signature model for Bursch, who was the first German to receive this honour.

== Discography (selection) ==
- 1971 Bröselmaschine, OHR/Pilz
- 1976 Peter Bursch und die Bröselmaschine, Xenophone
- 1978 I Feel Fine, Spiegelei
- 1981 Peter Bursch, Plane
- 1985 Graublau, EMI Music Distribution

Bursch has also produced numerous CD and DVD in accompaniment of his guitar tutorials.

== Publications (selection) ==
- Peter Bursch's Gitarrenbuch. Voggenreiter, Bonn 1975, ISBN 3-8024-0208-1.
- Peter Bursch's Gitarrenbuch 2. Voggenreiter, Bonn 1977, ISBN 3-8024-0214-6.
- Das Folk-Buch. Voggenreiter, Bonn 1979, ISBN 3-8024-0085-2.
- Peter Bursch Heavy Metal Guitar. Voggenreiter, Bonn 1988, ISBN 3-8024-0172-7.
- Peter Bursch's Beatles Buch für Gitarre. Teil 1. Voggenreiter, Bonn 1988, ISBN 3-8024-0170-0.
- Peter Bursch's Beatles Buch für Gitarre. Teil 2. Voggenreiter, Bonn 1988, ISBN 3-8024-0179-4.
- Rock Gitarre. Voggenreiter, Bonn 1998, ISBN 3-8024-0228-6.
- Peter Bursch's Kinder-Gitarrenbuch. Voggenreiter, Bonn 1999, ISBN 3-8024-0304-5.
- Zupftechniken für Gitarre. Voggenreiter, Bonn 2000, ISBN 3-8024-0385-1.
- Peter Bursch's Songbuch für Gitarre. Mit Audio-CD. Voggenreiter, Bonn 2002, ISBN 3-8024-0366-5.
- Peter Bursch's Songbuch für Gitarre 2. Mit Audio-CD. Voggenreiter, Bonn 2002, ISBN 3-8024-0454-8.
- Peter Bursch's Gitarren-DVD. Voggenreiter, Bonn 2006, ISBN 3-8024-0553-6.
