= Violet Gibson =

Failed assassin of Mussolini (1876–1956)

The Honourable Violet Gibson
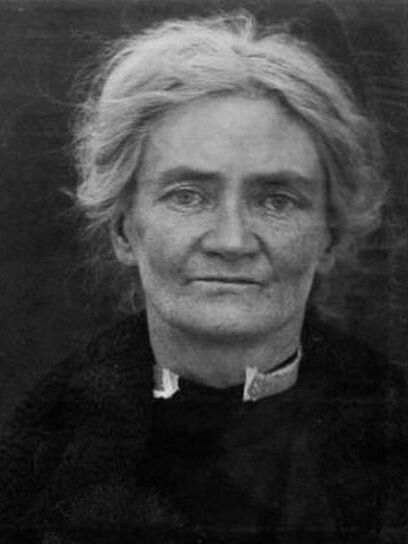
- Gibson in 1926
- Born: Violet Albina Gibson; 31 August 1876; Dublin, County Dublin, Ireland
- Died: 2 May 1956 (aged 79); Northampton, England
- Resting place: Kingsthorpe, England
- Parents: The 1st Baron Ashbourne (father); Frances Maria Adelaide Colles (mother)

Violet Albina Gibson (31 August 1876 – 2 May 1956) was an Irish woman who attempted to assassinate Benito Mussolini in 1926. She was released without charge but spent the rest of her life in a psychiatric hospital in England.

She was the daughter of Lord Ashbourne, Lord Chancellor of Ireland.

== Early life ==
Violet Gibson was born in Dublin, Ireland, on 31 August 1876. Her father was an Irish lawyer and politician, Edward Gibson, who was created Baron Ashbourne in 1885. Her mother, Frances, was a Christian Scientist. Violet experimented with Theosophy, then became a Roman Catholic in 1902, and adopted socialism, both to the displeasure of her family. She was presented as a debutante at court during the reign of Queen Victoria.

Gibson suffered severe ill health throughout her life. She had a nervous breakdown in 1922 due to her fiancé's sudden death; she was declared insane and committed to a mental institution for two years. She attempted suicide in Rome in early 1925.

== Shooting of Mussolini ==
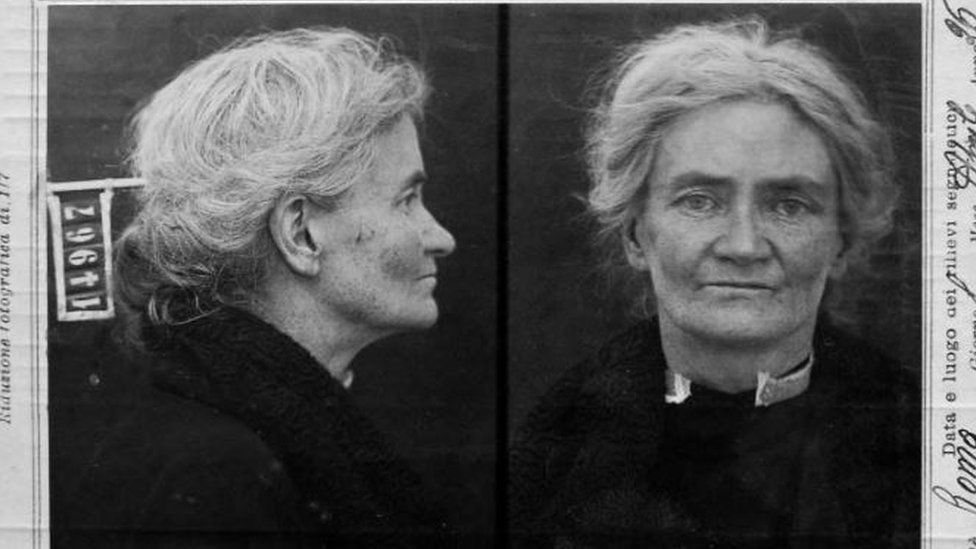
Gibson pictured after her arrest in 1926

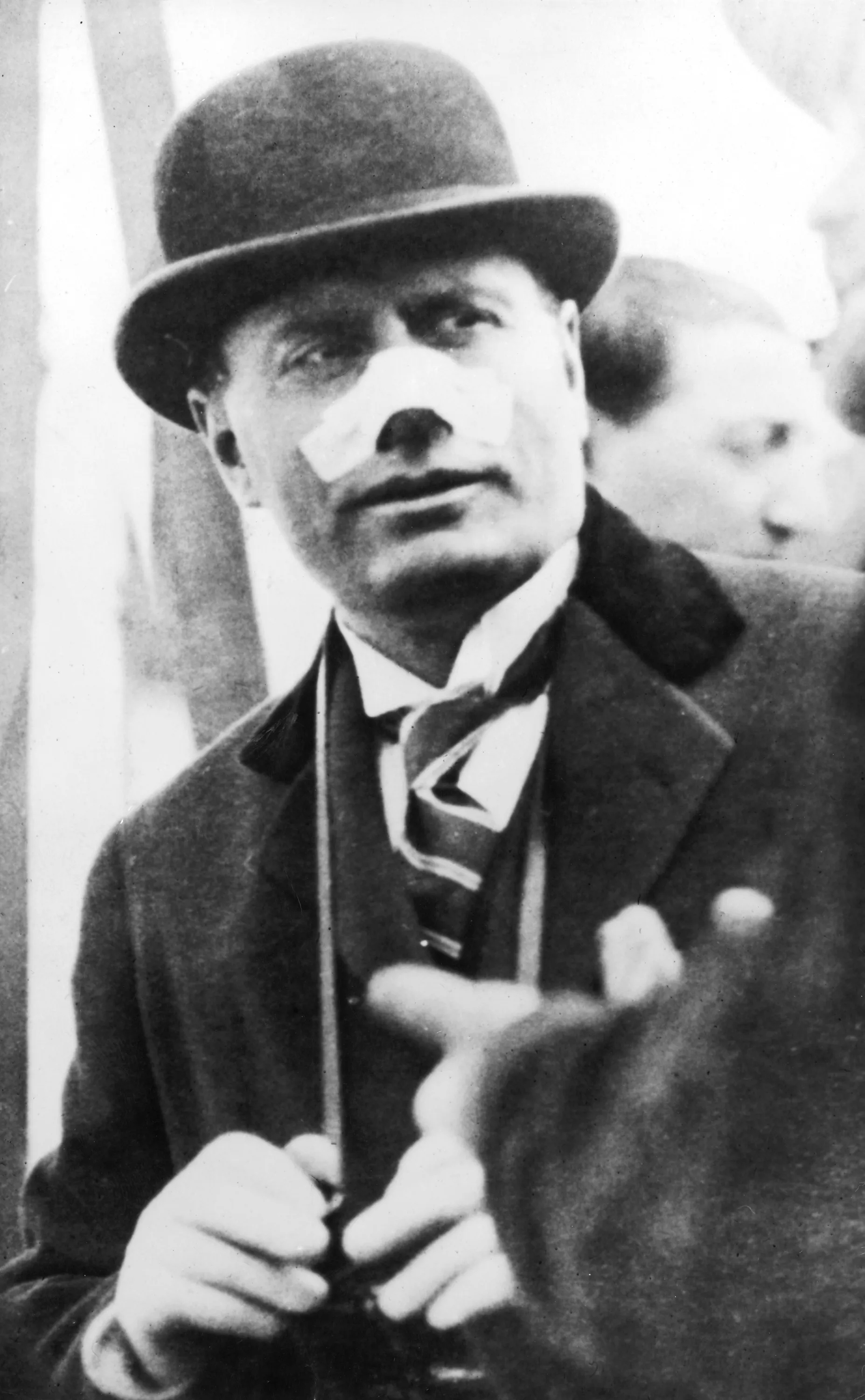
Mussolini with bandaged nose following his shooting by Gibson

On 7 April 1926, Gibson shot Mussolini, the Prime Minister of Italy and leader of the National Fascist Party, as he walked among the crowd in the Piazza del Campidoglio in Rome after leaving an assembly of the International Congress of Surgeons, to whom he had delivered a speech on the wonders of modern medicine. Gibson had armed herself with a rock to break Mussolini's car window if necessary, and a Modèle 1892 revolver disguised in a black shawl. She fired once, but Mussolini moved his head at that moment, and the shot hit his nose; she tried again, but the gun misfired. Mussolini's son, in his memoir, gives an alternative account, recounting that Gibson fired twice, once missing and once grazing Mussolini's nose. Gibson was almost lynched on the spot by an angry mob, but police intervened and took her away for questioning. Mussolini was wounded only slightly, dismissing his injury as "a mere trifle", and after his nose was bandaged, he continued his parade on the Capitoline Hill.

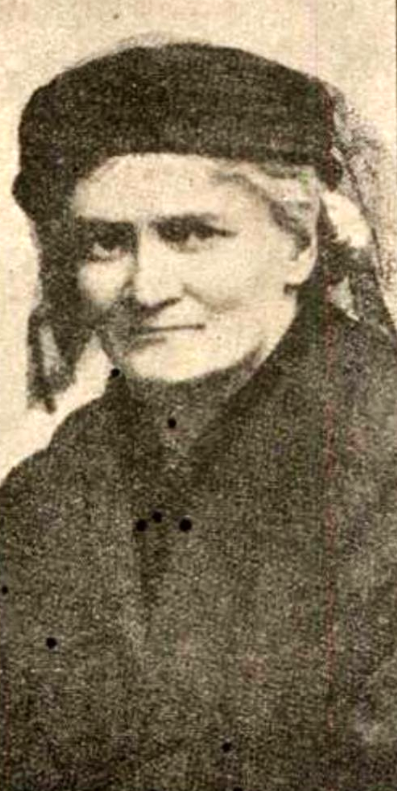
Violet Albina Gibson in Prabaasi Patrika 1926 published from Kolkata, India.

It has been thought that Gibson was insane at the time of the attack, and the idea of assassinating Mussolini was hers and that she worked alone. She told interrogators that she shot Mussolini "to glorify God", who had kindly sent an angel to keep her arm steady. As she did not hold Irish citizenship due to her Unionist views, she was deported to Britain after being released without charge at the request of Mussolini, an act for which he received the thanks of the British government.

The assassination attempt triggered a wave of popular support for Mussolini, resulting in the passage of pro-Fascist legislation which helped consolidate his control of Italy. She spent the rest of her life in a psychiatric hospital, St Andrew's Hospital in Northampton, despite repeated pleas for her release. She died on 2 May 1956 and was buried in Kingsthorpe Cemetery, Northampton.

== Legacy ==
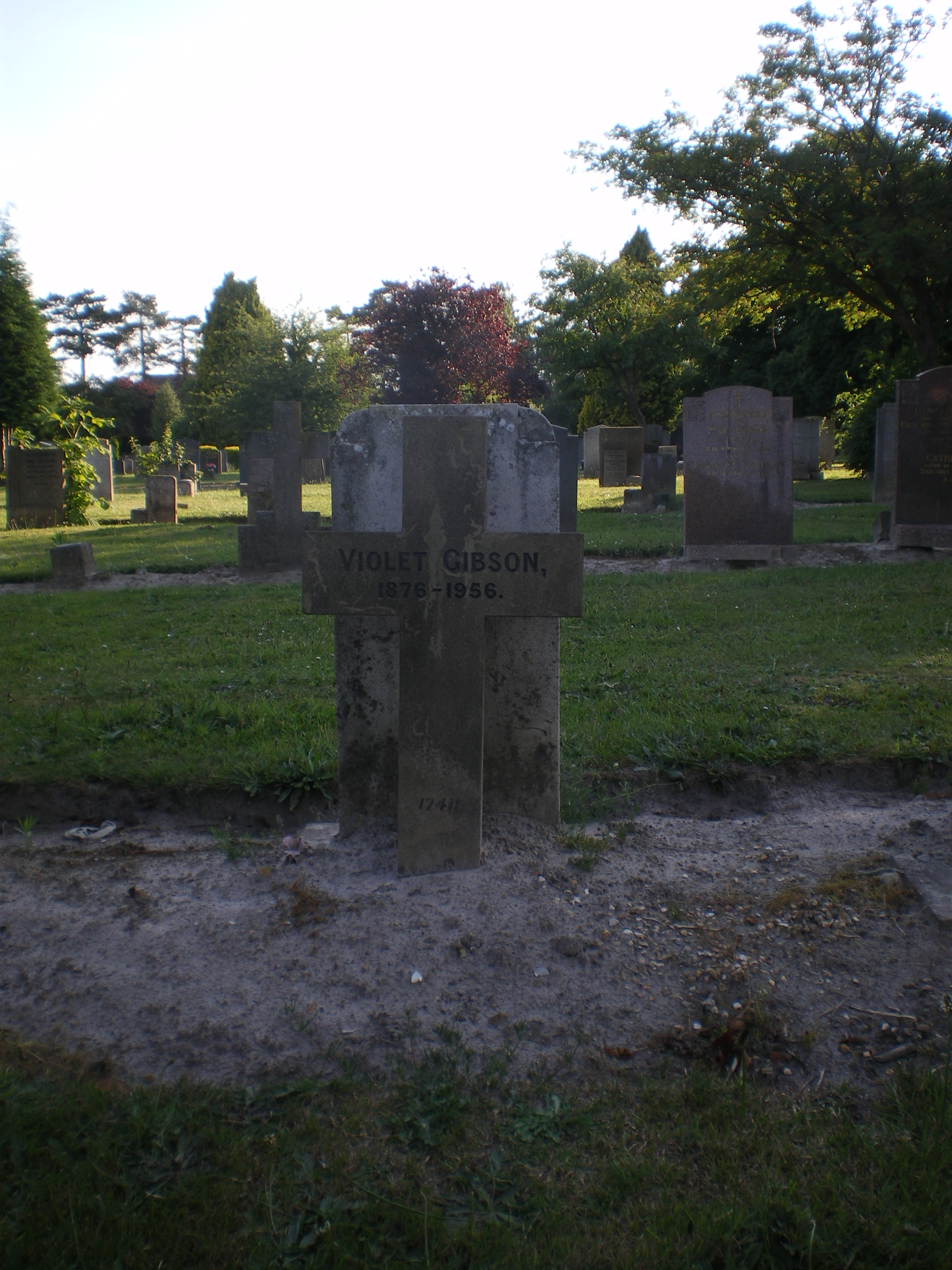
Her gravestone in Kingsthorpe Cemetery

A radio documentary titled The Irishwoman Who Shot Mussolini was made for RTÉ Radio 1 by Siobhán Lynam. A film drama-documentary with a similar name, Violet Gibson, The Irish Woman Who Shot Mussolini, was commissioned by TG4 and produced by Barrie Dowdall and Siobhán Lynam. Gibson's story is the subject of Noggin Theatre Company's play Violet Gibson: The Woman Who Shot Mussolini, written and performed by Irish playwright and actor Alice Barry. Many of these productions and films aim to delve into the possible reasons and motivations behind Gibson's attempt at Mussolini.

Lisa O'Neill's song "Violet Gibson" celebrates her. It is featured on O'Neill's album Heard a Long Gone Song. Evelyn Conlon's short story "Dear You" provides an epistolary account of events from Gibson's point of view. The story first appeared in both Italian and English in Tratti Review (Numero Novantatre, Italy, May 2013), and subsequently in Accenti: The Magazine with an Italian Accent (Canada). It also appears in Conlon's Moving About the Place Collection (Blackstaff, 2021).

In March 2021, Dublin City Council approved the placement of a plaque on her childhood home in Merrion Square to commemorate Gibson as "a committed anti-fascist". This was unveiled in October 2022.

== See also ==
- Assassination attempts on Benito Mussolini
