= Eleventh Battle of the Isonzo =

World War I battle fought between the Italian and Austro-Hungarian armies

Coordinates: 45.8000°N 13.5333°E

- Part of the Italian Front of World War I
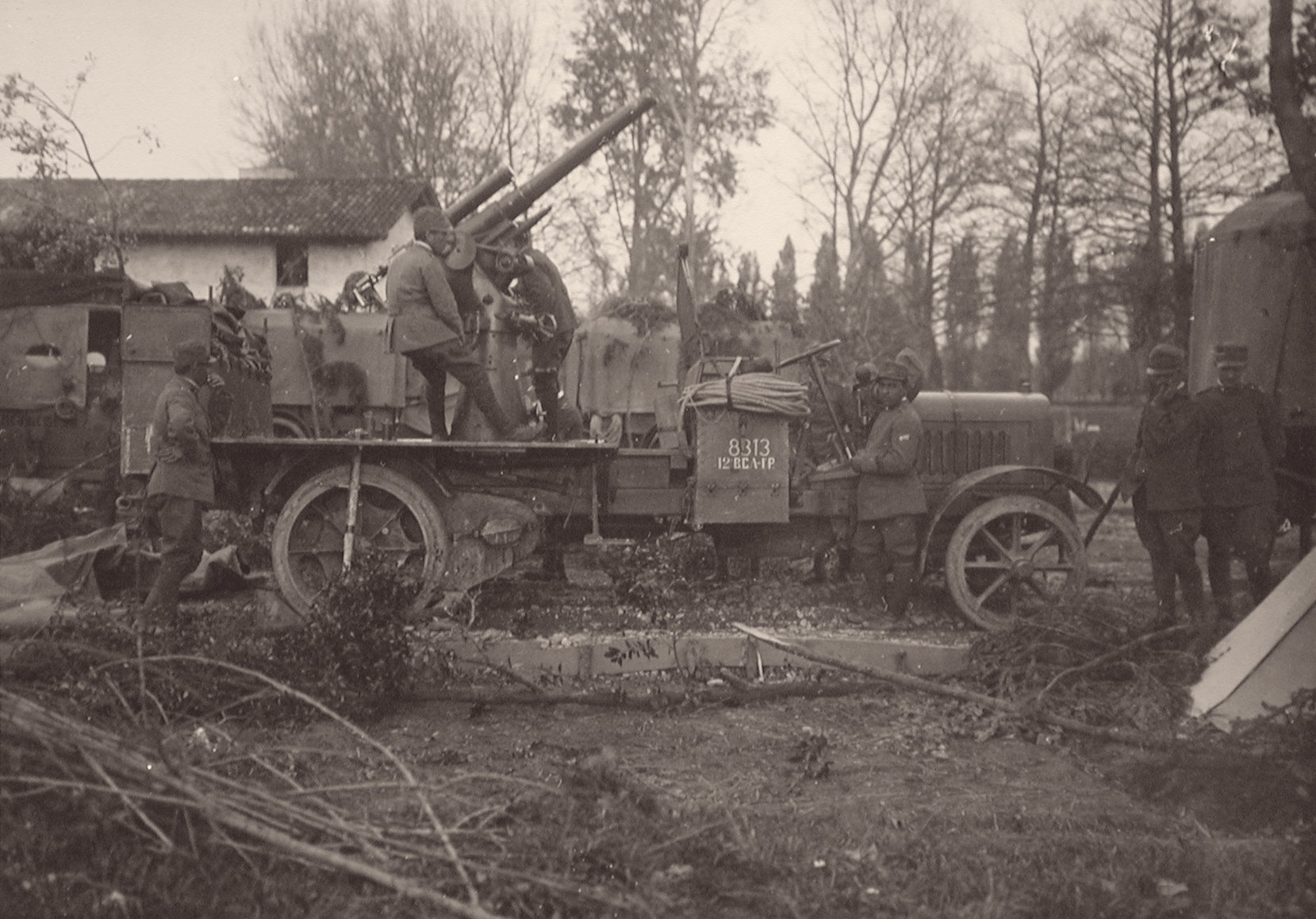
- Italian 75mm anti-aircraft gun during the Eleventh Battle of the Isonzo
Date	18 August – 12 September 1917
Location	Isonzo (Soča), near Monfalcone, Italy; Banjšice Plateau (Altopiano della Bainsizza), Slovenia
Result	Italian tactical victory

Belligerents
Italy	Austria-Hungary; Germany

Commanders and leaders
(Kingdom of Italy) Luigi Cadorna; (Kingdom of Italy) Luigi Capello; (Kingdom of Italy) Emanuele Filiberto di Savoia	(Austria-Hungary) Arthur Arz von Straußenburg; (Austria-Hungary) Svetozar Boroević von Bojna

Units involved
Second Army; Third Army	Army Group Boroević

Strength
600 battalions; 5,200 guns	250 battalions; 2,200 guns

Casualties and losses
158,000 casualties: 30,000 dead; 108,000 wounded; 20,000 missing or taken prisoner	115,000 casualties: 20,000 dead; 45,000 wounded; 30,000 missing; 20,000 taken prisoner

The Eleventh Battle of the Isonzo was a World War I battle fought by the Italian and Austro-Hungarian Armies on the Italian Front between 18 August and 12 September 1917.

== Background ==
On the Soča (Isonzo) River, Luigi Cadorna, the Italian Chief of Staff, concentrated three quarters of his troops: 600 battalions (52 divisions) with 5,200 guns.

== Battle ==
The attack was carried forth from a front from Tolmin (in the upper Isonzo valley) to the Adriatic Sea. The Italians crossed the river at several points on temporary bridges, but the main effort was exerted on the Banjšice Plateau, whose capture was to further the offensive and break the Austro-Hungarian lines in two segments, isolating the strongholds of Mount Saint Gabriel and Mount Hermada.

After fierce and deadly fightings, the Italian Second Army, led by General Capello, pushed back Boroević's Isonzo Armee, conquering the Banjšice Plateau and Sveta Gora. Other positions were taken by the Duke of Aosta's Third Army. However, Mount Saint Gabriel and Mount Hermada turned out to be impregnable, and the offensive wore out.

The battle was a significant tactical victory for the Italians, who conquered the Banjšice Plateau (Bainsizza) and made gains of about 10–12 kilometers. The Austro-Hungarians, exhausted and unable to sustain another attack, were on the verge of collapse. This led them to request German intervention in the area of the Isonzo. The Italians, however, could not find the resources necessary for another assault, even though it might have been the decisive one. Moreover, the bloodbath left the Italian Second Army (until then the most successful of the Italian Armies) split in two parts across the Soča (Isonzo), a weak point that was exploited by the Germans and Austrians in the subsequent Battle of Caporetto.

To commemorate the participation of the Royal Bavarian Infantry Lifeguards Regiment, Georg Fürst wrote the March "Isonzo-Marsch". The Italians fired 5.5 million artillery shells during the battle, including poison gas shells.

== See also ==
- Battles of the Isonzo – overview
  - Tenth Battle of the Isonzo – 12 May – 8 June 1917
  - Twelfth Battle of the Isonzo – 24 October – 7 November 1917, also known as the Battle of Caporetto
