= Panzer Greift An =

Unfinished book by Erwin Rommel

Panzer greift an (known as Tank Attacks in English) is an unfinished book on armoured tactics and warfare by Erwin Rommel. It was to be the follow-up and companion work to his earlier and highly successful Infanterie greift an, which was published in 1937.

== Manuscript ==
Panzer greift an exists only in the form of scattered manuscripts and notes, but due to the fame of its author, it has achieved legendary status as a work of military literature. It is believed Rommel started writing the text while commandant of the War Academy at Wiener Neustadt (Theresian Military Academy) in 1938, though he may have started earlier during his time as an instructor at the Potsdam War Academy (1935–37). His career as a military theorist and instructor, however, was preempted by his duties as a commander and soldier during World War II.

Following the end of the North African Campaign in 1943, he again started work on it, drawing upon his, by then, extensive experience and notes. But once more the war, along with ill health, interfered as he was put in charge of the entire Atlantic wall in 1944. After his staff car was strafed by an RCAF Spitfire fighter on 17 July that year, he again started on the work while recuperating from his injuries. However, he soon became implicated in the 20 July Plot against Adolf Hitler and was compelled to commit suicide on 14 October 1944.

Fearful of the loss of Rommel's personal papers, then mostly stored in Wiener Neustadt, his wife and son collected and hid them from both the SS and advancing Allied troops. According to Manfred Rommel, "My father's death made my mother all the more anxious to save his papers, not only for personal reasons but so that, when history came to be written, the truth might be told." In the chaos at the end of the war, some papers were lost or went missing, but most of them eventually ended up in the hands of the US Army.

== Publication ==
Most of what was to be in the book can now be found in the 1953 book The Rommel Papers, which was developed from notes and diary entries by Rommel during the North African Campaign. The book was edited by the British journalist and historian B. H. Liddell Hart, with assistance of a former Wehrmacht general Fritz Bayerlein, who served on Rommel's staff in North Africa, and Rommel's widow and son. The volume contained an introduction and commentary by Liddell Hart.

== Popular culture ==
In the film Patton, a book with this title is on the nightstand when he is awakened by his aides who inform him that Rommel is about to attack his army. When the tank battle is over, Patton exclaims "Rommel, you magnificent bastard, I read your book!" This, of course, never could have occurred, as Rommel never completed his tank book, although Patton may very well have read Rommel's earlier book on infantry.

== See also ==
- Rommel myth
