= Graue Bücherei =

Series of publications issued by Ludwig Voggenreiter Verlag in Potsdam

Die graue Bücherei (German; The Grey Library) was a series of publications issued by the Ludwig Voggenreiter Verlag in Potsdam, which in the mid-1930s from 1934 onwards released treatises on military and defense policy questions, written by leading experts in the field. At that time, the series apparently fulfilled the needs of the Reichswehr/Wehrmacht.

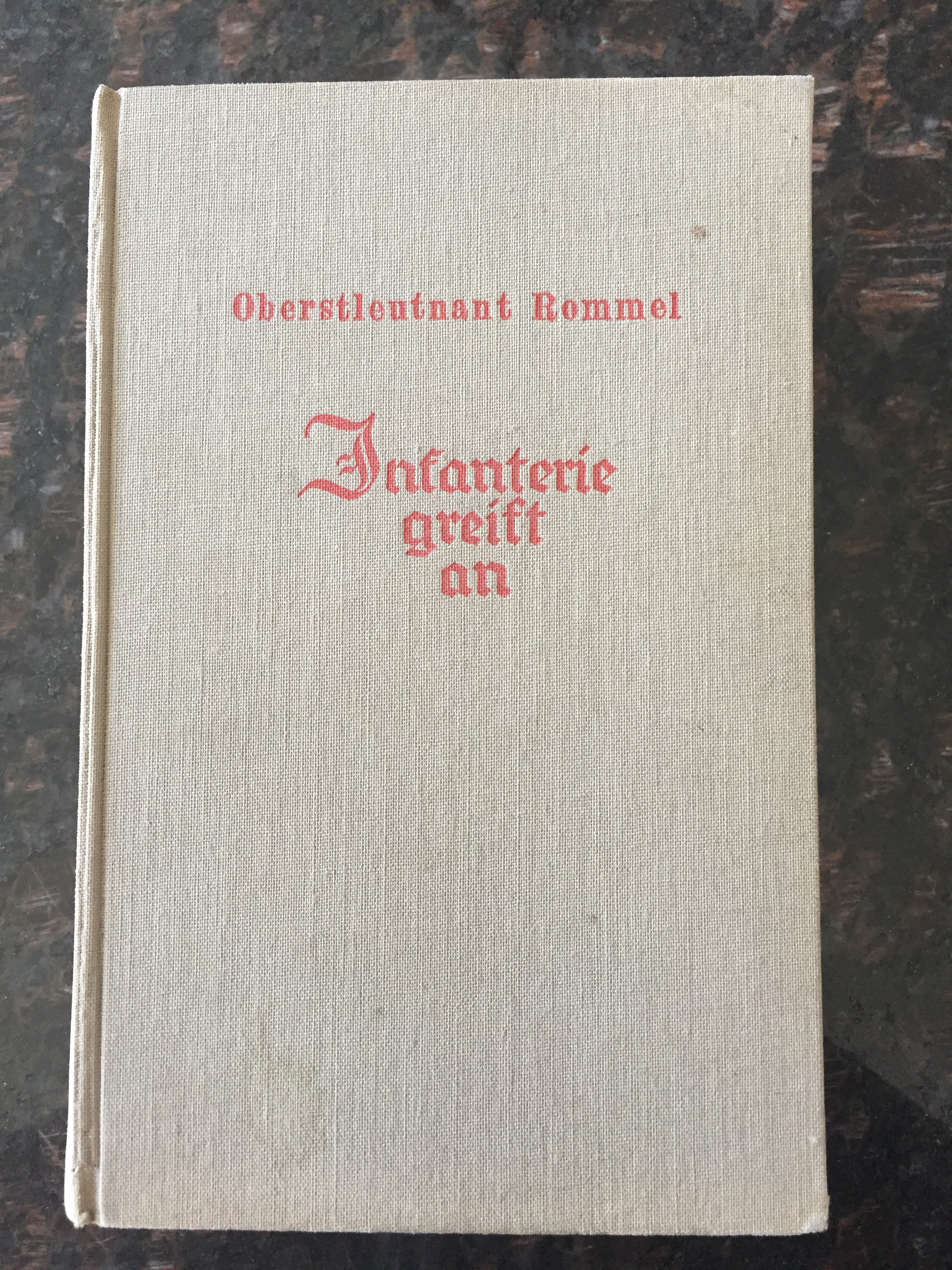
Oberstleutnant Rommel: Infanterie greift an (Infantry Attacks)

== Content and orientation ==
The series comprised books of varying length that dealt with issues of military strategy, tactics, mobilization, occupation policy, and military reforms. It appeared in a uniformly designed grey cover, which gave the series its name. Authors included both German military theorists and foreign officers and specialists. Among the most well-known titles of the series are Erwin Rommel Infanterie greift an (1937) and Charles de Gaulle: Frankreichs Stoßarmee (1935; German translation of Vers l'armée de métier). In addition, other monographs on defense policy issues were published.

The Graue Bücherei documents the focus of the Voggenreiter publishing house in the 1930s on specialist works in the field of military and security policy. It represents an example of thematic serial production in the area of military literature of that period and gained recognition among professionals and officer circles.

The editor, the German officer Arthur Ehrhardt (1896–1971), began his career as a military writer in 1934; his books were also published by Voggenreiter Verlag, in particular his most important work, the 1935 study Der Kleinkrieg. Geschichtliche Erfahrungen und künftige Möglichkeiten (The Small war: Historical experiences and future possibilities), with new editions in 1942 and 1944. For the series Ehrhardt translated into German several classics of modern military theory by such well-known authors as Sir Basil Liddell Hart (The Future of infantry), J. F. C. Fuller (Generalship, its diseases and their cure), and George C. Marshall (Infantry in battle).

== Volumes ==
The following overview, arranged roughly by year of publication, does not claim to be complete:

- Erwin Rommel: Infanterie greift an: Erlebnis und Erfahrung. 1934
- Basil Henry Liddell Hart: Infanterie von morgen. 1934
- Charles de Gaulle: Frankreichs Stoßarmee: das Berufsheer - die Lösung von morgen. 1935
- Walther Nehring: Heere von morgen: Ein Beitrag zur Frage der Heeresmotorisierung des Auslandes. 1935
- Hugo Schäfer: Kriegerisches Italien. Heer und Miliz nach der Neuordnung vom September 1934. 1935
- Markomanus (d.i. Hugo Schäfer): Brennpunkt Böhmen. Die Tschechoslowakei in beschleunigter Aufrüstung. Mit einer Skizzen-Beilage. 1935
- Justus Schmitt: Wirtschaftliche Mobilmachung. 1935
- John Frederick Charles Fuller: Generäle von morgen: Betrachtung über militärisches Führertum. 1935
- M. J. Kurtzinski: Taktik schneller Verbände. Russische Ansichten über die Verwendung motorisierter und mechanisierter Einheiten. 1935
- Georg Werner Feuchter: Probleme des Luftkrieges. 1936
- George C. Marshall: Infanterie im Kampf: Kriegserfahrung gegen Friedensirrtümer (2 volumes). 1936
- Albrecht Blau (in Psychologisches Laboratorium des Reichswehrministeriums): Geistige Kriegführung. 1937

== Miscellaneous ==
The publisher also released the series Fremde Heere im Bild as well as the soldier's song book Morgen marschieren wir: Das Liederbuch der deutschen Soldaten (1939), which was published on behalf of the Oberkommando der Wehrmacht by Lieutenant Hans Baumann (1914–1988). According to the publisher's prospectus, the text edition of this “handy book, easily carried in the coat pocket” contained 260 songs.

The song book Lied über Deutschland. Lieder der jungen Mannschaft ("von der Fahne, von der Ehre, vom Glauben, von der Gemeinschaft, vom Arbeiter, vom Bauern, vom Soldaten, von der Marschkolonne, von der Seefahrt, vom geselligen Leben"), collected and edited by Georg Blumensaat, was also published by Voggenreiter.
