= Luigi Capello =

Italian general (1859–1941)

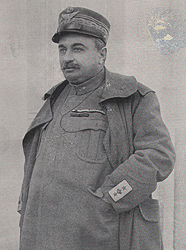
- Born: 14 April 1859; Intra, Kingdom of Sardinia
- Died: 25 June 1941 (aged 82); Rome, Italy
- Military career
- Allegiance: Kingdom of Italy
- Branch: Royal Italian Army
- Service years: 1875 - 1920
- Rank: Army General
- Commands: Second Army
- Conflicts: Italo-Turkish War; World War I; Italian front; Isonzo Front

Luigi Capello (14 April 1859 – 25 June 1941) was an Italian general, distinguished in both the Italo-Turkish War (1911–12) and World War I. During the Italo-Turkish War he served in Cyrenaica and took part in operations near Derna, commanding a column in the final action of the war in October 1912.

During World War I, Capello was the commander of several Army corps and led the Italian troops that captured Gorizia (Sixth Battle of the Isonzo). In June 1917, he reached the apex of his military career when he took command of the Second Army (Italy) and captured the Bainsizza Plateau (Eleventh Battle of the Isonzo). Later, he was removed from command after the Italian defeat at the Battle of Caporetto (October–November 1917). He had failed to check the advance of the Imperial troops (which included for the first time, German troops sent from the Western Front) before being forced to cede his command for health reasons. Capello was blamed for the defeat, and he never returned to service.

Despite the defeat, Capello was considered one of the best Allied generals of the First World War. He had a dominant personality and a restless, passionate character, and showed intelligence and tactical and strategic ability. Driven by an offensive spirit, he ordered a series of frontal attacks that cost his troops very high casualties; he was noted for his perspicacity, initiative and analytical ability, and was described as "by far the best of the commanders of the Italian army".

After the war, Capello joined the National Fascist Party, from which he was expelled in 1923 due to his Masonic connections. He was later involved in the planning of an attempt to assassinate Benito Mussolini in 1925 along with Tito Zaniboni (it), for which he was tried and sentenced to thirty years jail in 1927. He was released in 1936 after serving nine years.

== Biography ==
=== Military career ===
Born in Intra (since 1939 a frazione of Virbania) on the shores of Lake Maggiore in relative poverty, before the unification of Italy, Luigi Capello revealed a very strong personality that allowed him to bypass numerous social prejudices. Commissioned as a second lieutenant in 1878, he later attended the War School. Capello became a colonel in 1910 and commanded the 50th Infantry Regiment, Parma Brigade. With the rank of major general, he then assumed command of the "Abruzzi" Brigade assigned to Libya during the Italo-Turkish War where he had command of a brigade in the 4th Special Division of General Ferruccio Trombi, taking part in fights in the Derna sector. Promoted to lieutenant general in 1914 he commanded the 25th division (Cagliari) and then with the entry into the World War 1 of Italy, which took place on 24 May 1915, he was assigned to the 3rd Army. He commanded the 25th Division of the XIII Corps.

Capello took part in the battles on the Karst Plateau until being promoted to Lieutenant General on 28 September 1915. He then commanded the VI Army Corps facing Gorizia and the heights of Podgora and of Sabotino. Despite the numerous offensives made during the third and fourth Battles of the Isonzo, the Austrian counteroffensives stymied the best efforts of the Italians. However, his great ambition helped him to be initially successful during the First World War achieving victory in the Sixth Battle of the Isonzo, with the conquest of the city of Gorizia. This was the first Italian victory of any substance and one that caused Capello's star to shine. The general was subsequently the subject of much envy, including that of General Cadorna.

Thanks to the conquest of Gorizia, Capello gained great popularity, both among the lower classes and among the Italian media. From here his career experienced a clear push upwards. Now Cadorna viewed Capello as a serious rival, and on 7 September 1916, he was transferred to the command of the XXIII Army Corps. Subsequently, Capello was given command of the V Corps of the First Army and was recalled to the Isonzo Front, where he was commander of the Gorizia sector. It was from Gorizia that he organized the Eleventh Battle of the Isonzo for the control of the heights around Gorizia. He was given the command of the 2nd Army (at Isonzo) in June 1917 which led to the conquest of Bainsizza in the eleventh offensive in that sector. Bainsizza was another Italian victory, which now served the belief that the sole successes achieved by the Italian army both bore Capello's imprint. Capello commanded as many as nine army corps (between Monte Rombon and Vipacco). As Commander of the 2nd Army he was able to innovate offensive tactics, and in particular, he supported the creation of the Arditi, so much so as to be the object of dislike by other army officials, who saw in the Arditi, the Praetorians of Capello, and in Capello himself, a general who surrounded himself with mercenaries and the faithful with allegiance to him, creating rivalries that would isolate him at Caporetto.

On 24 October 1917 everything collapsed. Capello was placed alongside other Armies by Cadorna in order to repel the Austro-German offensive led by generals Otto von Below and Svetozar Borojević. The Italian army was unprepared to fight a defensive battle after having conducted all its operations until then in an offensive stance, being unaware of the innovative methods that prevented the troops from getting bogged down in "no man's land". Germany had developed a fighting technique known as infiltration through the Stosstruppen to counter widely-used trench warfare, thus denying the defenders a continuous line instead of simply overwhelming it through numbers alone. Such attacks exhausted more men and ammunition, as well as making them have to wait for reinforcements even once they cleared "no man's land" in one battle because there would just be another "no man's land" waiting for them at the next battle. The Italian command underestimated the effectiveness of the Germans at applying whatever intelligence the Austrians could offer them about the terrain and the Italian army's own disposition. Gas masks were in short supply. The Italians also underestimated the effectiveness of the Germans at mountain warfare, figuring the Germans would mostly leave the mountains to the Austrian-Hungarians. Capello had neglected to organize the Second Army for defence, which led to the complete collapse of the front line. All this was exacerbated because sickness forced him to relinquish his command during the battle, this time to General Luca Montuori. With the defeat at Caporetto, Capello's military career ended. On 8 February 1918, Capello was relieved of all posts, put before a Commission of Enquiry into the causes of Caporetto and by order of the Commission, he was retired.

=== Political career ===
Capello was later among the first to join the Italian Fascist movement; presiding over the Congress of Rome in November 1921 and in October 1922 he took part in the March on Rome. Following the vote of the Grand Council in February 1923 which declared incompatible, membership in both Fascism and Freemasonry, Capello openly declared his Masonic membership, but did not resign from the Fascists. In 1924 he physically defended the headquarters of the Grand Orient of Italy, Palazzo Giustiniani, from Fascist attacks. After the assassination attempt against Mussolini in 1925, Capello's military role was marginalized by the Fascists. Capello organized patrolling activities, near the Italian Freemasonry's seats, to which he had adhered during the 1910s.

Capello was arrested in Turin on charges of having taken part in the organization of the failed attack against Mussolini in 1925 organized by Tito Zaniboni. After a show trial, in 1927 he was sentenced to thirty years in prison, but he was released in January 1936. Released from prison, he spent the last years of his life in an apartment in Rome, where he died in June 1941. By decree in 1947, he was given back all the military decorations that he had been awarded.

=== Military Honors ===
- Grande ufficiale dell'Ordine militare di Savoia
- Cavaliere di gran croce dell'Ordine militare di Savoia
- Medaglia di bronzo al valor militare
- Order of Karađorđe's Star with swords

== See also ==
- Battles of the Isonzo
- Ferruccio Trombi
- Freemasonry in Italy
