= Voggenreiter Verlag =

- Founded: 1919
- Founder: Franz Ludwig Habbel, Ludwig Voggenreiter
- Country of origin: Germany
- Headquarters location: Wachtberg
- Publication types: Sheet music, instruments, songbooks
- Official website: www.voggenreiter.de

Voggenreiter is a German music publishing house.

== History ==
In early 1919, Bavarian scout leaders, Ludwig Voggenreiter and Franz Ludwig Habbel, established the publishing house Der Weiße Ritter (The White Knight) in Regensburg. With the aim of renewing the German Scout Association (de: der Deutschen Pfadfinderbundes or DPB) which had developed heavily paramilitary structures. To support this, the Bavarian scouts organised the 'German Scout Day' at Prunn Castle in the Altmühl Valley in August 1919. Franz Ludwig Habbel was a key speaker at this event.

The publishing house printed a newspaper known as Der Weiße Ritter which intended to serve as an open forum to support the youth movement in the spirit of scouting.

After 1921, the publishing house relocated to Potsdam and, after Habbel left the company in 1924, the company renamed itself in 1927 operating under the name 'Ludwig Voggenreiter Verlag'. It published various scouting and youth movement books and magazines, as well as books and journals from the organisation (de: Bund).

In the late 1920s, the publishing house increasingly attracted authors influenced by the scouting movement. Series such as Bücher der Waldverwandtschaft (en: Books on Forest Affinity or Kinship), German Games Manual, and German Camp Manual played a significant role in shaping the development of the Scout Movement and the Youth Organisation.

The portfolio comprised mainly song- and logbooks, work aids, idea guides and scout leader materials, as well as books for adolescents and fiction. Publications were specifically oriented toward the scouts until the scout movement was banned in Germany in 1933/34.

After the National Socialists seized power in 1933, the publishing program underwent significant changes. The inability to cater to the Boy Scouts and scout members – a crucial target group for financial stability – led to a shift in focus. The publishing house began producing songbooks for the Hitler Youth and numerous military titles. Among these were Erwin Rommel's Infanterie greift an and Hans Baumann's Morgen marschieren wir. Songbook of the German Soldiers. Additionally, they published colonial literature and literary works with a National Socialist orientation.

In early 1937, the Reich Security Main Office confirmed in its Publishing Guidelines that Ludwig Voggenreiter Verlag, unlike the publishing house Günther Wolff, had fully embraced National Socialism. Two years after the Potsdam publishing house was dissolved in 1945, Ludwig Voggenreiter died in the Buchenwald Soviet internment camp.

Two years after Voggenreiters death, his brother Heinrich transferred the remaining company rights of use to a new entity he named 'Voggenreiter Verlag', moving the company to Bad Godesberg. The company, once again focused on its pre-1933 themes, publishing bestselling songbooks such as Der Turm, published by Konrad Schilling and Helmut König in eleven booklets, and Der Kilometerstein.

In 1967 Ernst Rüdiger Voggenreiter, Heinrich Voggenreiters son, founded the Xenophon record label which published songs by Reinhard Mey and Hannes Wader, and other musicians. In 1972 Ernst took over the management of the publishing house, developing it into a pure music publishing house. Throughout the 1970s and 1980s, the company began the production of music books for autodidacts, one notable book being the guitar book by Peter Bursch.

After the death of Ernst Voggenreiter following a plane crash on 17 December 1992, his sons Charles and Ralph took over the management of the company. They introduced musical instruments, CDs and DVDs to the companies portfolio.

In May 2017, Voggenreiter moved from Bonn to Wachtberg.

== Products ==
Today: The current range includes specialist literature in the field of music, including textbooks for various instruments and songbooks, which are available in both printed and electronic form. Musical instruments are also available to complement the range. Brands in the range include VOLT by Voggenreiter (ukuleles, percussion and equipment), SEVILLA concert guitars and LAKOTA acoustic guitars.

An English version of this catalogue is available for the international market. The ‘Voggy's Kinderwelt’ range is aimed specifically at pre-school and primary school children and includes educational books and instrument sets. These sets contain one or more instruments and accompanying teaching materials in book form. Many of these sets are supplemented by an accompanying CD.

The range includes instruments such as recorders, harmonicas, glockenspiels, children's guitars, ukuleles for children and various percussion and sound instruments. Since 2001, there has been a separate catalogue for the toddler and children's range, which is established as a leading brand for ‘music for children’ in toy shops and online retailers. An English version of the catalogue is also available.

Since 2020, a special range of ‘music sets for kindergartens and schools’ has also been available. These sets were developed on the basis of the latest scientific findings in early musical education and compiled in collaboration with music educators and teachers. An international English-language version of the catalogue is also available for this range.

== See also ==
- Graue Bücherei
