= Giovanni Greppi (architect) =

Italian architect (1884–1960)

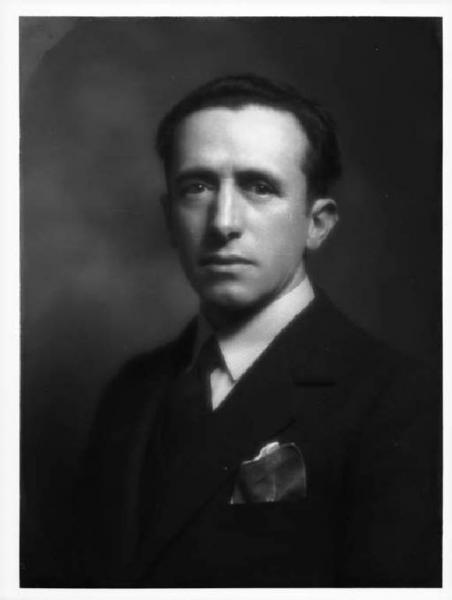
Giovanni Greppi (1884-1960)

Giovanni Greppi (Milan, September 19, 1884 - Milan, April 12, 1960) was an Italian architect best known for having designed some of the most famous military shrines in Italy.

== Biography ==
Graduating from the Brera Academy in 1907, he took part in the competition for the facade of the Milan Central Station, finishing in second place. He also won a scholarship that allowed him to travel and study abroad, and from 1908 to 1910 he attended the École des beaux-arts in Paris and also visited Istanbul.

He also devoted himself to propaganda and advertising campaigns. During the First World War, for example, he produced a manifesto to support the raising of funds for the national loan. In 1924 he participated with numerous other artists in the famous catalog it:Veni vd vici for the entrepreneur it:Giuseppe Verzocchi.

Giovanni Greppi built a factory town on behalf of Dalmine between 1934-40 and, together with Giovanni Muzio, the Palazzo della Cassa di Risparmio delle Provincie Lombarde in Milan: known as "Palazzo delle Colonne" due to the long portico on the facade, the building is considered by architectural historians as one of the most interesting bank buildings built in Milan between the wars. It is characterized by innovative engineering and technological solutions: its most notable element is five-floor underground vault. During the Second World War, it was considered the safest air-raid shelter in Milan: starting from June 1940, some of the most precious works of art from Milan's museums were stored here. Greppi also designed the building of the Banca Popolare di Milano.

He died in 1960 due to injuries from a road accident that had occurred in the spring of the previous year. He was buried in the cemetery of Craveggia. On November 2, 2020 his name was entered in the Famedio of Milan.

== Major works ==
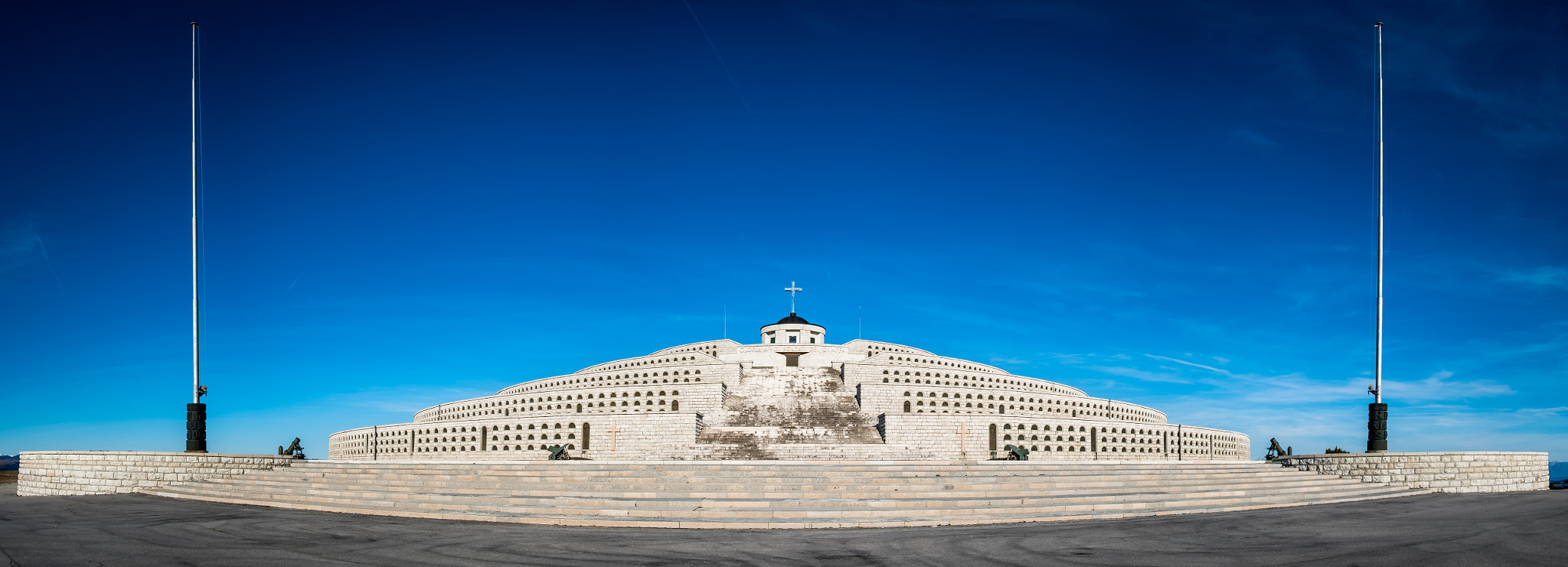
Military Memorial of Monte Grappa

Greppi acquired international fame with his designs for military shrines: he had first approached the theme of honors for the war dead with the Military Memorial of Monte Grappa (1932-1935). In addition, the commission for the construction of the Redipuglia War Memorial, chaired by General Cei, imposed Giovanni Greppi as architect and Giannino Castiglioni as sculptor, the two having a close-knit partnership since their time at the Academy. Under General Cei and together with Castiglioni, Greppi went on to design further memorials at Timau, Kobarid, Colle Isarco, Pian di Salesei, Passo Resia and San Candido.

In 1938 he also designed the military memorial of Bezzecca. Also in collaboration with Giannino Castiglioni he also built memorials abroad, in particular at Bligny in France, to honor the dead of the Garibaldi Legion on the Marne front.

== Other buildings ==
- Innocenti office building, via Pitteri, 81, Milan (1939)
- Palazzo della Banca Popolare di Milano in Piazza Meda, Milan
- Building of the Savings Bank of the Lombard Provinces in via Verdi, Milan
- Church of San Giuseppe in Dalmine
- Giuseppe Sinigaglia stadium, Como

Greppi was also particularly active in the design of residential buildings; in particular, it is possible to point out:

- A series of houses in piazza Piemonte, Milan (1919)
- Small villa in Corso Vercelli, 56, Milan (1919)
- House in Piazza Piemonte, 3 (1919)
- House in via Monferrato, 2 (1919)
- Villa Gagliano in Piazza Aspromonte, Milan (1919) (probably demolished)
- Casa Collini, via Statuto, 12, Milan (1919)
- Casa Valesi-Piazza, via Goldoni, 11, Milan (1929)
- The Greppi brothers house, via Mameli, 20, Milan (1929)
- Facetti-Suitermaister House, via Carlo Poerio, 11, Milan (1930)
