= The Italian Charnel House, Kobarid =

Italian war cemetery

Coordinates: 46.247102°N 13.583974°E

The baroque chapel of St Anthony with the 20th century structure below it

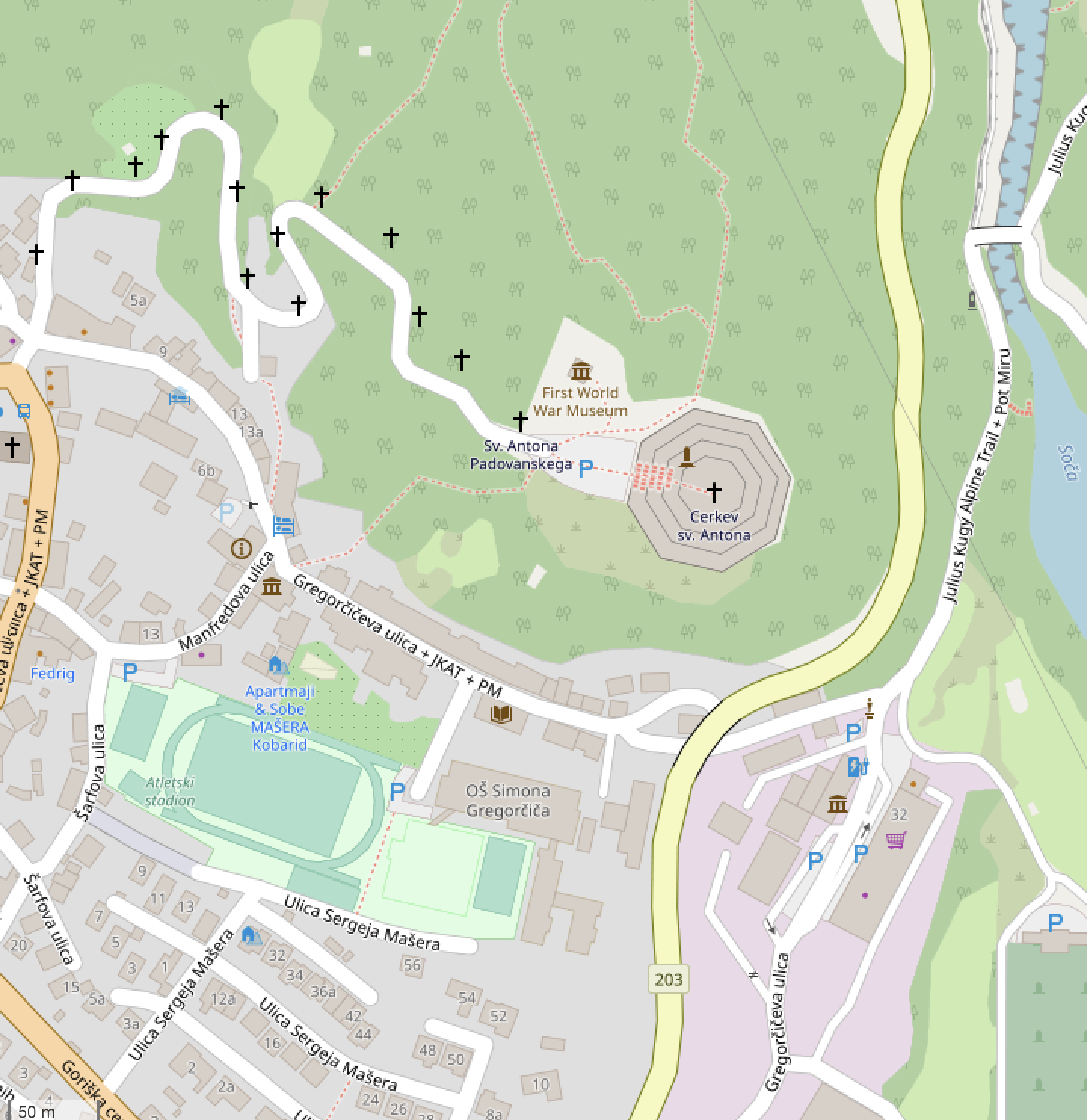
The octagonal structure of the charnel-house built around the chapel of St. Anthony, Kobarid

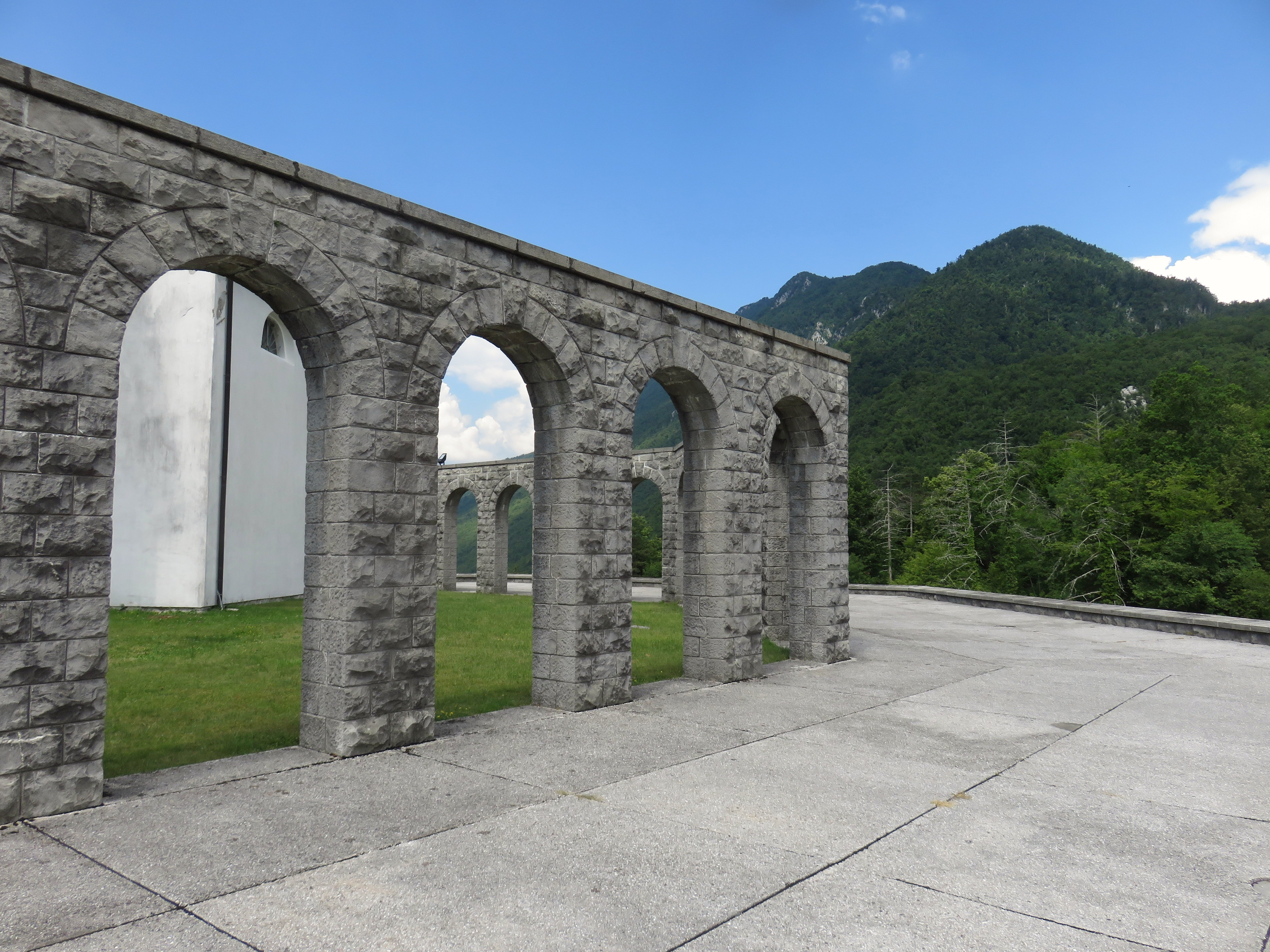
Walkway around the upper level of the shrine

The Italian Charnel House, Kobarid (Italian: Sacrario militare di Caporetto; Slovene: Italijanska kostnica nad Kobaridom) is an Italian military shrine in Kobarid, Slovenia. Sited on the battlefield of Caporetto, it houses the remains of 7,014 Italians who fell during the battles of the Isonzo.

== Design and construction ==
The work was initiated by the Italian state in 1936, during the period when Kobarid was in Italian territory. The Extraordinary Commissioner for the Honouring of the War Dead Ugo Cei commissioned Costruzioni Marchioro di Vicenza to build a series of ossuaries and war memorials, including Kobarid as well as Redipuglia and Monte Grappa. Work was completed at Kobarid in September 1938.

At the core of the site is a small chapel on the Gradič hill dedicated to Saint Anthony of Padua and consecrated in 1696. The chapel contained frescoes by a local artist, Luka Šarf, but these were mostly lost during the adaptation of the site to the new memorial, and only the fresco depicting universal judgement remains.

Beneath this the architect Giovanni Greppi built three octagonal modern structures rising below the baroque chapel and the sculptor Giannino Castiglioni carved the fourteen Stations of the Cross on the winding road that leads up to the shrine from the main square of the town.

The remains of Italian soldiers who had fallen between it:Monte Rombon and Tolmin were removed from the existing military cemeteries of the area, including Drežnica, Drežniške Ravne, Gabrje, Kamno, Smast, Bovec and Kobarid, and collected in the new shrine. Among the 7,014 remains are those of 1,748 unknown soldiers, collected in six tombs placed on the sides of the central stairways. The names of those who are known are set in serpentine marble panels.

== The memorialisation of Caporetto ==
The memorialisation of Caporetto was problematic for Mussolini's government, as it was for Italy in general. The defeat was regarded as a stain on the national character, and an acceptable national interpretive framework was needed in order to account for it, preserving both the dignity of the commanders and the admirable qualities of the ordinary troops.

Initially the simplest way of reconciling these requirements was often just to avoid the topic of Caporetto as much as possible. The 1934 film Gloria:Documentazione Cinematografica Della Guerra 1915-1918 by Roberto Omegna celebrated courage and national pride, but scarcely mentioned Caporetto at all.

However a second narrative also developed, which regarded the defeat at Caporetto as a critical moment in the foundation of the new Italy. The Fascist party referred to Caporetto as the moment of its birth, and all aspects of commemorating the war were subsumed into a new fascist narrative.

Mussolini disliked melancholy or mourning sentiments, so the grand war memorials he commissioned were intended to be assertive statements of the dignity of Italy's fighting men. They were also conceived of as sentinelle della patria (“watchtowers of the nation”). At the charnel house, as at Redipuglia, the names of the dead appear under the heading ‘Presente’, as if they were still on duty. In building these memorials, Mussolini remobilised the Italian war dead and deployed them in a commemorative landscape of monumental fascist structures.

The charnel house commemorates Caporetto as a national Calvary, bringing together the symbolism of the Catholic Passion with the monumental elements of fascist style. The pillars which mark the start of the winding road up to the summit bear, on one side, the cross, and in the other, the star of Italy. The road itself is a sort of pilgrimage route, and those venturing along it may stop to pray and contemplate each of Castiglioni's sculptures, which is provided with a bench for the purpose.

== Inauguration ==
The charnel house was inaugurated by Benito Mussolini on 20 September 1938. Mussolini was undertaking a tour of the northeast; on the same day as the ceremony at Kobarid he had also inaugurated the Italian ossuary at Oslavia, laid the first stone in the building of a new Autonomous Fascist Institute in Gorizia, opened a new underground power station in Doblar and a new aqueduct in Volče. Two days earlier, as part of the same tour, he had announced fascist Italy's first racial laws in Trieste and inaugurated the giant ossuary at Redipuglia.

The Slovenian anti-fascist group TIGR planned to assassinate Mussolini during the inauguration of the shrine and a young man from Bovec was ordered to blow him up. However the plot was discovered and the attempt was foiled.

== Today ==
The charnel house is the only war memorial maintained today by the Italian state which does not stand on the soil of Italy. The remains of all other Italian war dead who fell on Slovenian soil were moved to the ossuaries of Redipuglia and Oslavia in Italy. Every year a ceremony is held at Kobarid to honour the dead.
