= Military Memorial of Monte Grappa =

Italian war cemetery

Coordinates: 45.8706°N 11.7998°E

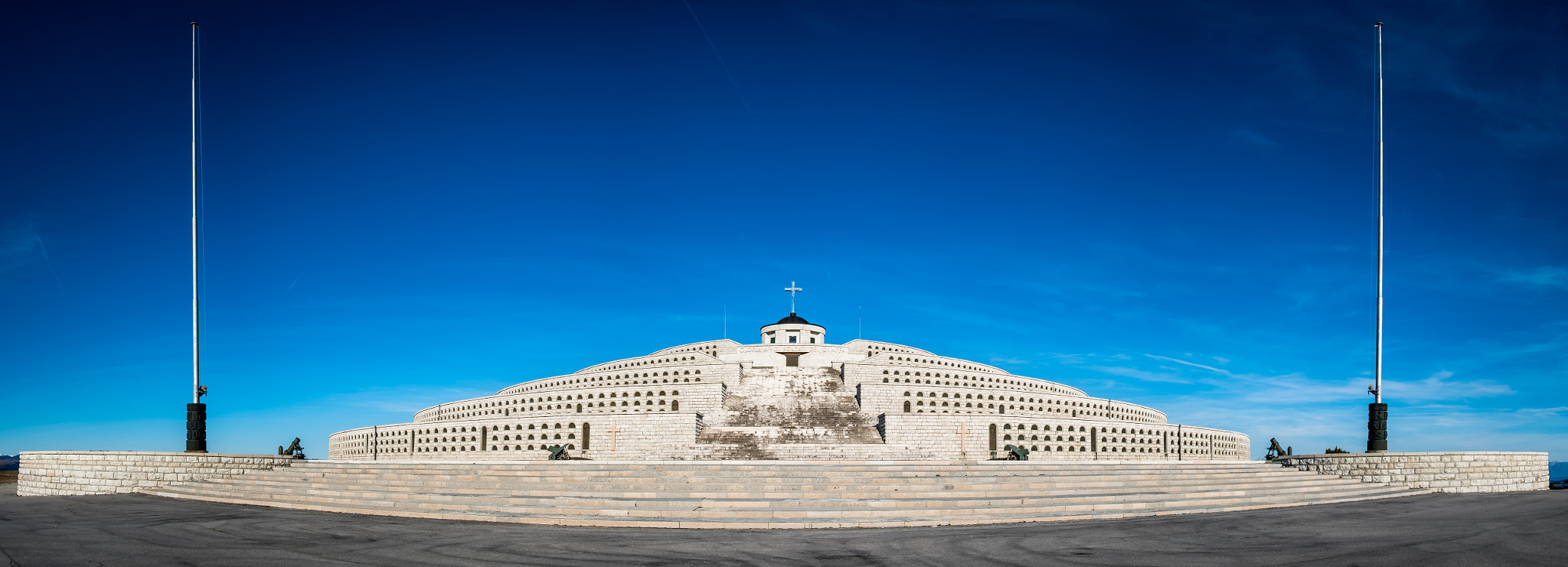
Monte Grappa Memorial

The military memorial of Monte Grappa is the largest Italian military ossuary of the First World War. It is located on the summit of Monte Grappa between the provinces of Treviso and Vicenza, at 1,776 meters above sea level. Access to the memorial is via the Strada Cadorna, built by the army on the orders of General Luigi Cadorna to bring construction materials for the fortification on Monte Grappa in 1917.

== Historical notes ==
A census in 1920 by the General Commission for Honouring the War Dead showed that there were 140 small cemeteries with the remains of around 40.000 dead on the slopes of the mountain. In 1923 a national committee was established to gather all the remains on the mountain for reinterrment. In 1925 it was decided to build a single monumental cemetery in the tunnels under the summit of the mountain, but, once the works were completed, there were problems with damp in the newly built tunnels and Mussolini did not approve the project. The committee was dismissed and in 1932 Mussolini placed General Ugo Cei in charge of a new commission tasked with building a suitably monumental ossuary. It was therefore decided to build the current outdoor military shrine.

The design was by the same pair who created the Redipuglia War Memorial and The Italian Charnel House, Kobarid, architect Giovanni Greppi and sculptor Giannino Castiglioni. Construction took only eight months and involved 3,000 workers. The shrine was formally inaugurated on 22 September 1935. It is made up of a series of semicircular levels of decreasing sizes leading to the top of the shrine. The characteristic element of the shrine is the dovetail motif used for the niches that house the bodies of fallen soldiers. The columbarium model, together with the use of stone and bronze for the closures of the niches, recalls the Roman classicism so much in favour during the Fascist period.

== Structural elements ==
The shrine contains the remains of 22,950 soldiers. The northern sector contains the Austro-Hungarian ossuary with the remains of 10,295 dead of whom 295 have been identified. The southern sector houses the Italian ossuary with the remains of 12,615 dead of whom 2,283 have been identified. Running between them is the 300m long Via Eroica. The 14 monoliths along it bear the names of mountain peaks which were the scene of intense fighting during the war. Along it are buried 40 soldiers whose remains were found after the construction of the shrine. At the beginning of the heroic road, to the north, there is the Portale Roma, designed and built by the architect Alessandro Limongelli. On the portal is carved: "Monte Grappa you are my homeland", the first verse of the song “Monte Grappa“.

At the center of the Italian ossuary is the chapel of the Madonna del Grappa, placed on the summit on 4 August 1901 by the patriarch of Venice Giuseppe Sarto (later Pope Pius X), a symbol of the Christian faith in the Veneto. During the First World War, the statue found itself in the middle of a battlefield, and was damaged by an Austrian grenade. After the war it as removed for repair and restoration and was displayed in a number of cities before being returned to its place in the chapel around which the Memorial was later built.

The shrine also contains the tomb of Marshal Gaetano Giardino, who commanded the Italian forces on the mountain during its defence in 1917–18.

== Gallery ==
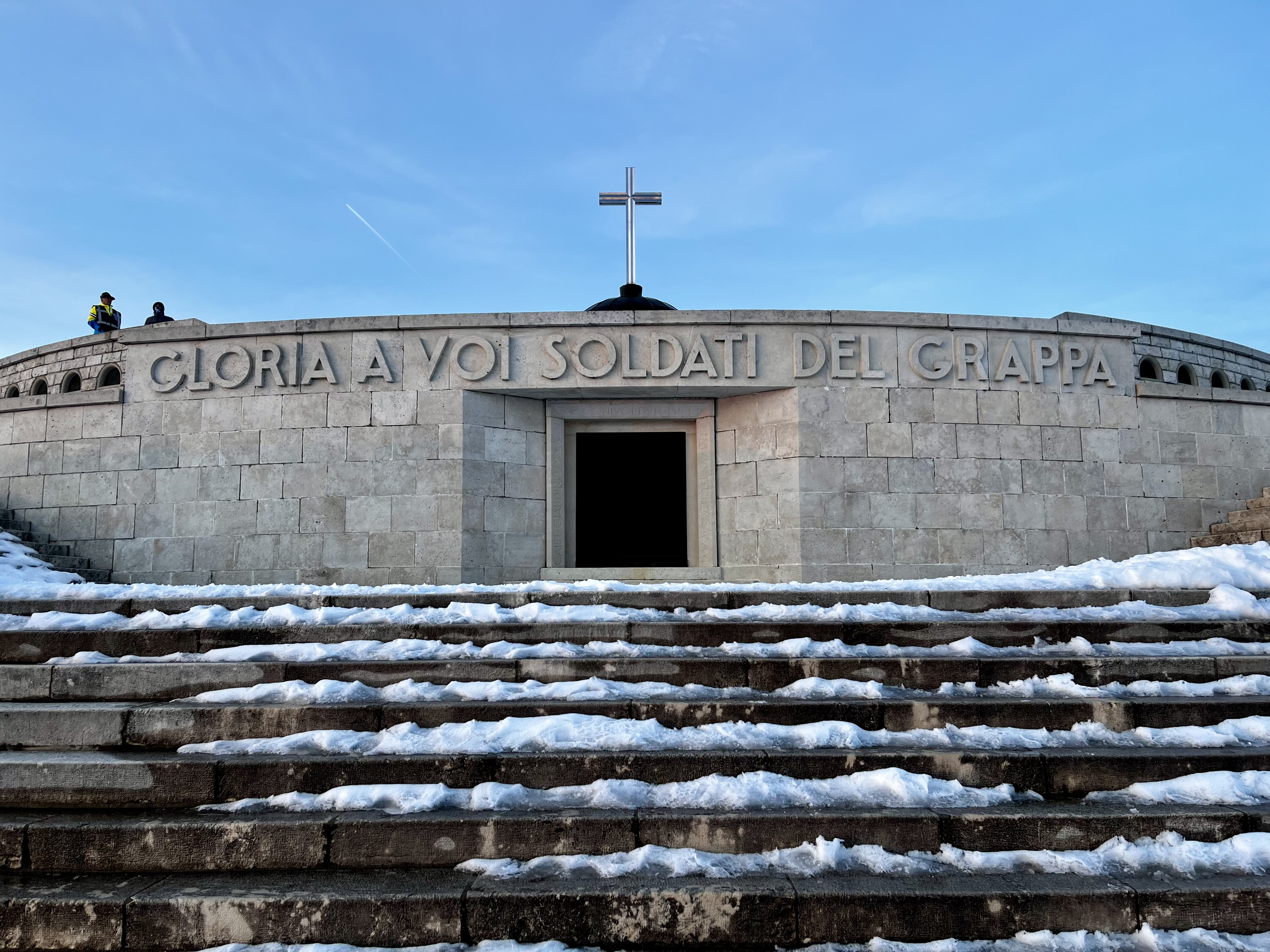
Tomb of Marshal Gaetano Giardino

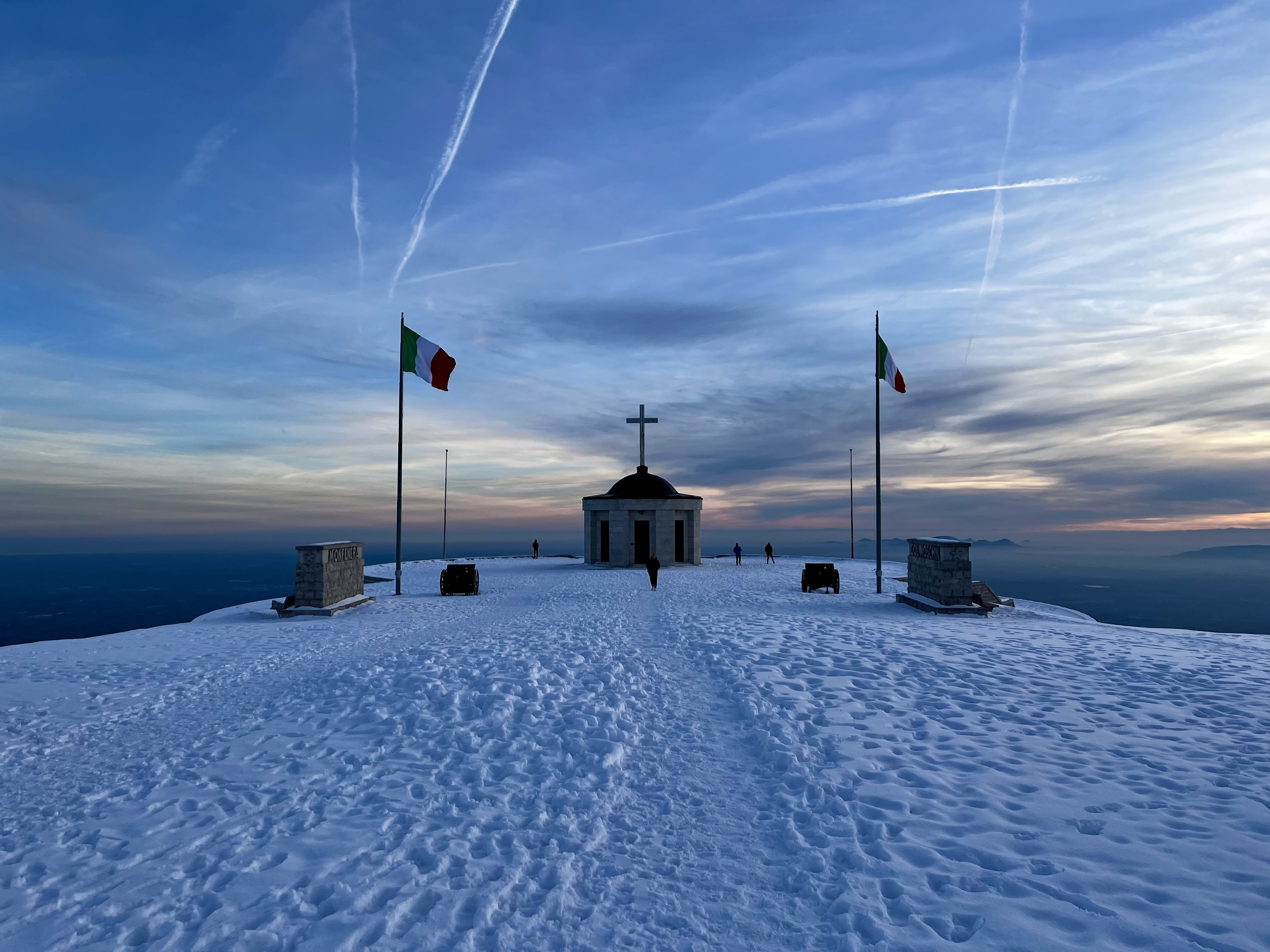
Via Eroica
