= Oslavia War Memorial =

Italian fascist monument

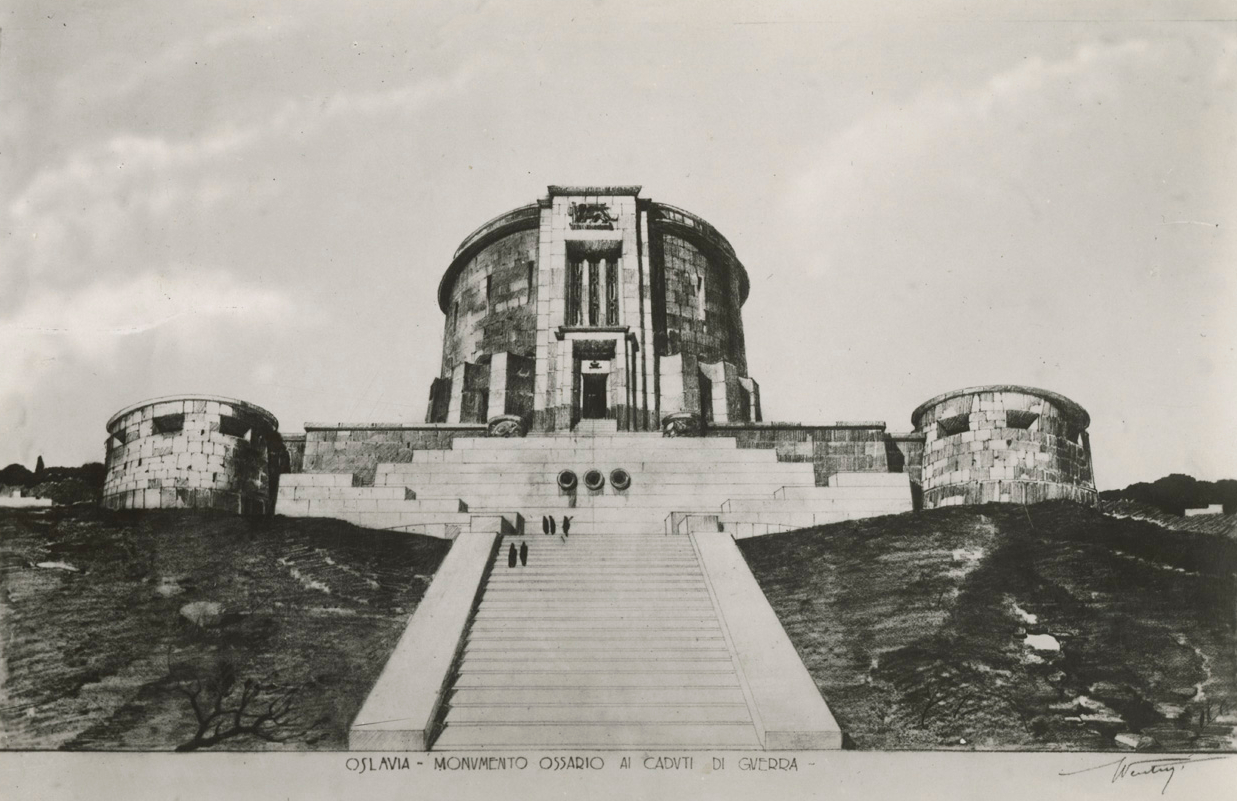
Oslavia War Memorial

The Oslavia War Memorial is an Italian monument to soldiers who fell in battle during the battles of the Isonzo, particularly those who died during the taking of Gorizia in 1916. It stands on a 150m hill in the village of Oslavia, on the outskirts of Gorizia. The hilltop was on the front line as Austro-Hungarian troops defended the salient around Gorizia during the first, third and fourth battles of the Isonzo.

The ossuary contains the remains of 57,201 Italian soldiers, 36,440 of them unknown, largely taken from original war cemeteries on the Bainsizza Plateau, as well as those of 539 Austro-Hungarian troops. The remains of Italian soldiers who had fallen on the Karst on land that became Yugoslavia were moved to ossuaries in Italy, either at Oslavia or at Redipuglia.

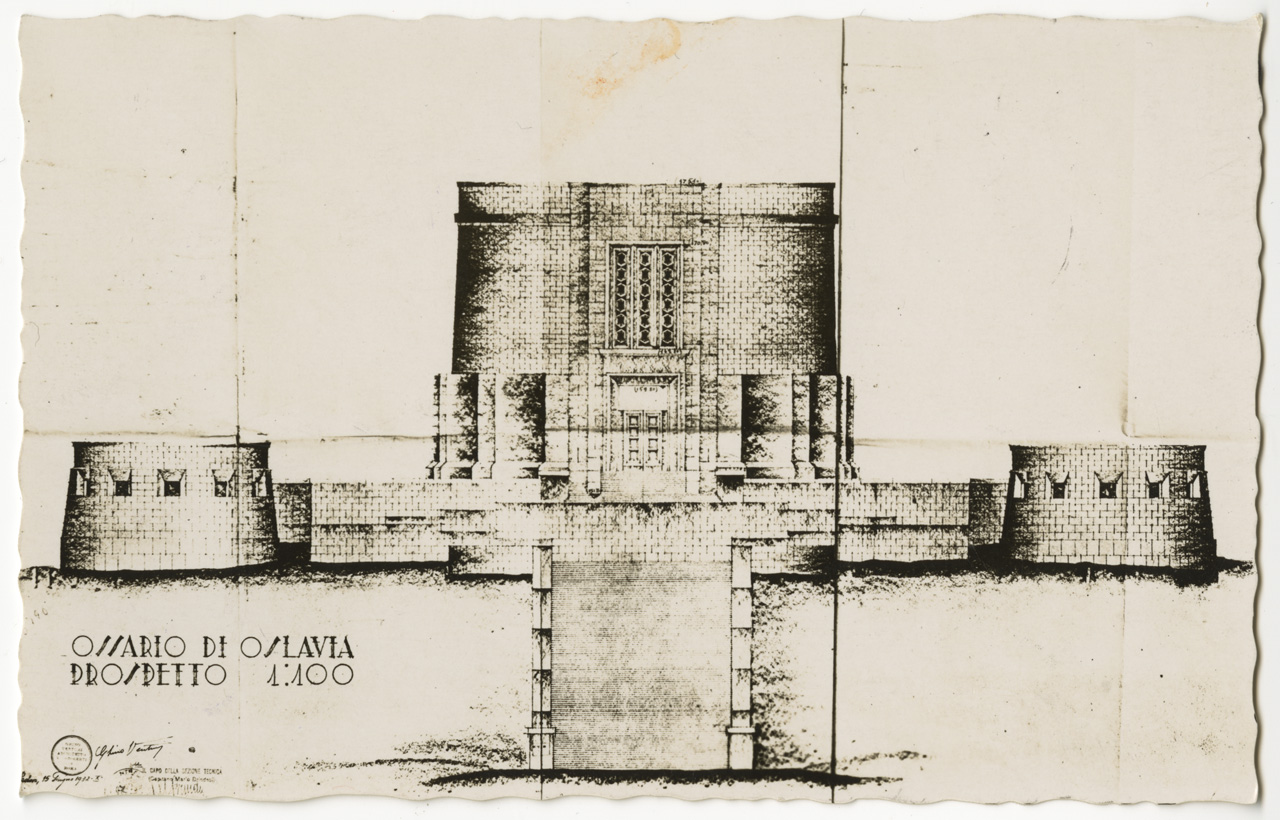
Architectural plan for the Oslavia memorial

The monument was designed by Ghino Venturi, cofounder of the Sindacato Fascista Architetti. Proposed in 1932 and completed in 1938, it consists of a round tower above a flight of steps, with three lower bastions (Prelli, Montanari and Langoris) connected by underground passages. The names of the identified dead line the walls of the internal circular chambers. In the central tower is a tall black marble cross; in the crypt below is the tomb of General Achille Papa and of twelve other holders of the Gold Medal of Military Valour. A bell named “Chiara” in the campanile sounds at sunset. The central tower was originally open to the sky but the structure suffered from water penetration. A plexiglass roof structure was added, and in 2016 this was replaced with a permanent polycarbonate covering.

The memorial was erected in an area of mixed Slovene and Italian population. The fortress-like structure, built in a medieval style reminiscent of Totenburg in Germany, was intended to make a statement of Italian permanence and occupation.

== Inauguration ==
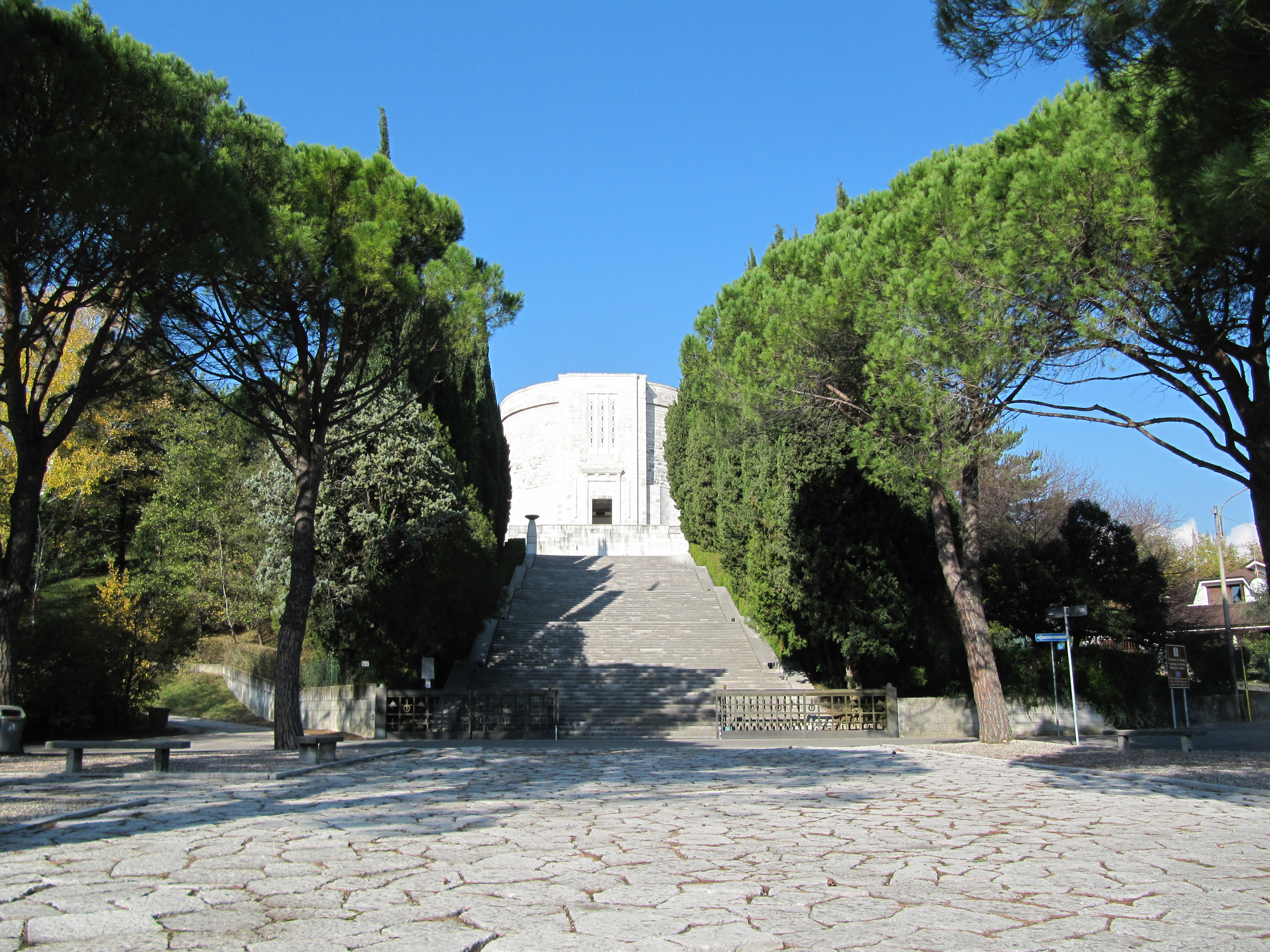
Oslavia War Memorial

The memorial was inaugurated by Benito Mussolini on 20 September 1938. Mussolini was undertaking a tour of the northeast; on the same day as the ceremony at Oslavia, he also inaugurated The Italian Charnel House, Kobarid, laid the first stone in the building of a new Autonomous Fascist Institute in Gorizia, opened a new underground power station in Doblar and a new aqueduct in Volče. Two days earlier, as part of the same tour, he had announced fascist Italy's first racial laws in Trieste and inaugurated the giant ossuary at Redipuglia.
