= Lierna =

Municipality in Lombardy, Italy

- Comune
- Comune di Lierna
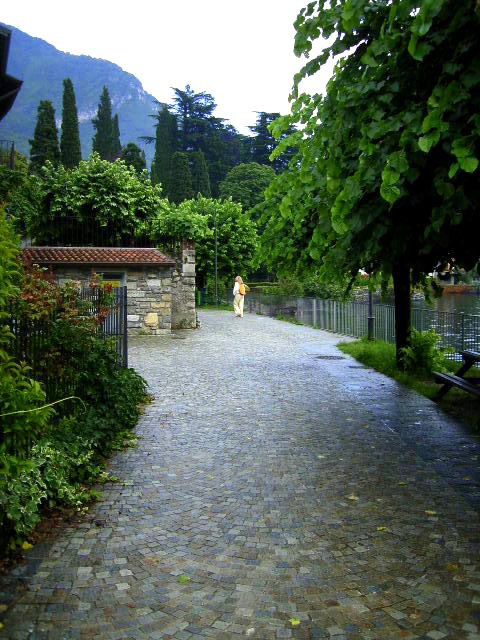

- Location within Italy Location within Lombardy
- Coordinates: 45°57′30″N 9°18′15″E
- Country: Italy
- Region: Lombardy
- Province: Province of Lecco (LC)
- Frazioni: Bancola; Casate; Castello; Cisarino; Genico; Giussana; Grumo; La Foppa; Mugiasco; Olcianico; Sornico; Villa

Government
  - Mayor: Silvano Stefanoni

Area
  - Total: 11.24 km^{2} (4.34 sq mi)
- Elevation: 202 m (663 ft)

Population (30 September 2017)
  - Total: 2,124
  - Density: 189.0/km^{2} (489.4/sq mi)
- Demonym: Liernesi
- Time zone: UTC+1 (CET)
  - Summer (DST): UTC+2 (CEST)
- Postal code: 22050
- Dialing code: 0341
- Patron saint: St. Ambrose
- Saint day: 7 December
- Website: Official website

Lierna is a comune in the province of Lecco in Lombardy, in north-west Italy. It lies on the eastern shore of Lake Como, about 60 kilometres (37 mi) north of Milan and about 15 kilometres (9 mi) north-west of Lecco.

Lierna borders the comuni of Esino Lario, Mandello del Lario, Oliveto Lario and Varenna.

== History ==
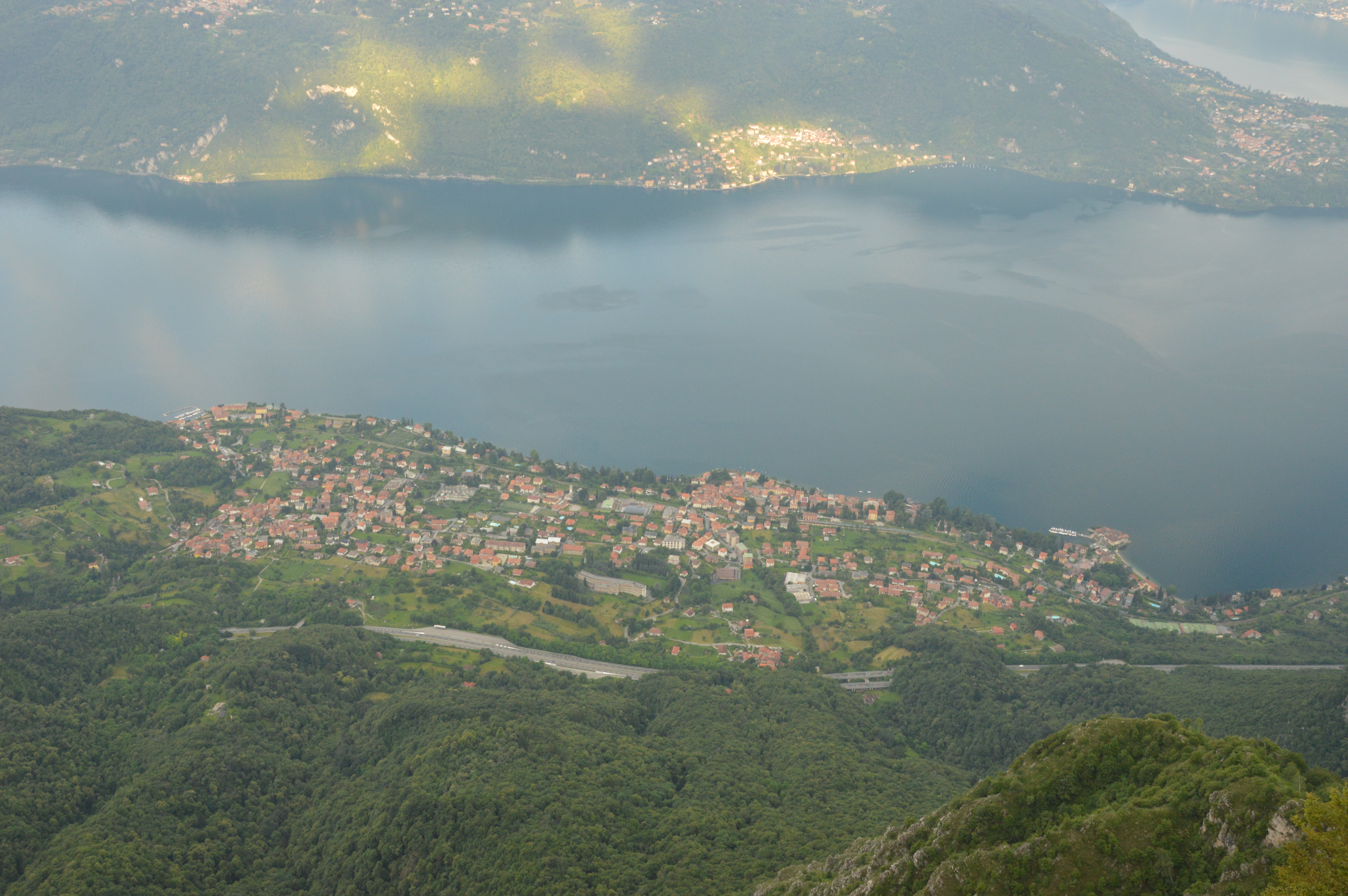
View of Lierna.

The first mention of Lierna dates to 854 AD, but Roman remains, including a mosaic floor now in the Palazzo Belgioioso of Lecco, attest to much earlier settlement. The name of the village may be of Roman or of Celtic origin. Between 1035 and 1202 it was a feud of the Monastery of San Dionigi in Milan. Lierna was contested between Milan and Como, and between the Della Torre and Visconti families. It passed into the hands of the Marchesino Stanga in 1499, and in 1533 to the Sfondrati family of Cremona, who held it until 1788. Lierna became a comune in 1743, when it was separated from that of Mandello.

In 1927, the Milanese sculptor Giannino Castiglioni opened a studio at his house in Lierna. He died in Lierna on 27 August 1971. He left some preparatory plaster casts to the comune; a museum to house them is under construction.

In 1933, an incomplete fossil of Lariosaurus balsami, a nothosaurid from the Middle Triassic (circa 240 million years ago) of which the first example was discovered at Perledo, some 10 km north of Lierna, was found in a quarry in the frazione of Grumo. It is now in the Museo di Storia Naturale in the Palazzo Belgioioso of Lecco.

== See also ==
- Lierna Castle
