= Monte Grappa =

Mountain in Italy

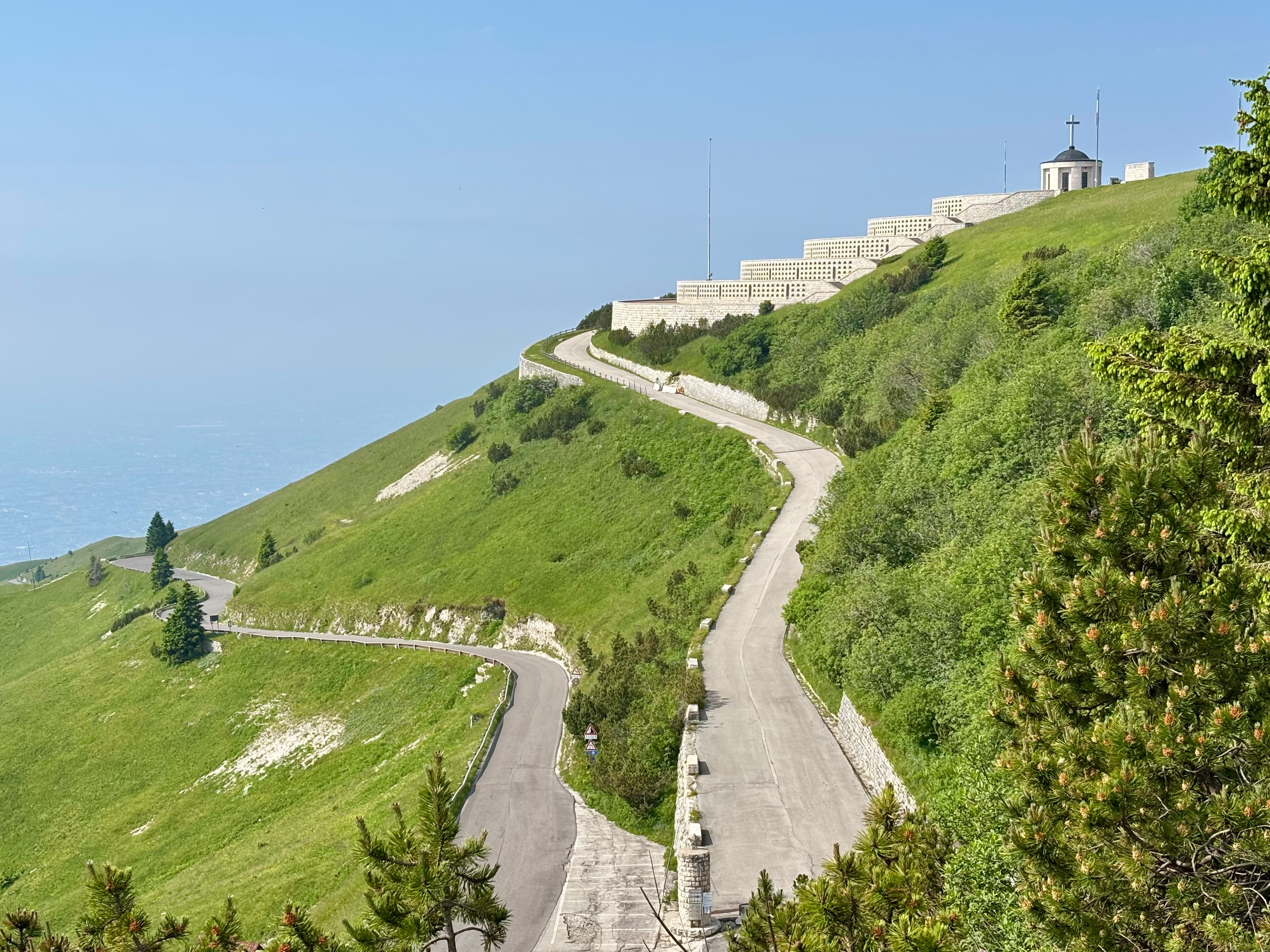
- The famous road to the top of Monte Grappa and the World War I ossuary

Highest point
- Elevation: 1,775 m (5,823 ft)
- Prominence: 1,456 m (4,777 ft)
- Coordinates: 45°52′24″N 11°47′57″E

Geography
- Location within Alps
- Location: Veneto, Italy
- Parent range: Venetian Prealps

Monte Grappa (Venetian: Mónte Grapa) (1,775 m) is a mountain of the Venetian Prealps in Veneto, Italy. It lies between the Venetian plain to the south and the central alpine areas to the north. To the west, it is parted from the Asiago upland by the Brenta river, and to the east it is separated from the Cesen-Visentin massif by the Piave river. To the north lie Corlo lake and Feltre valley. In the past, the mountain was called Alpe Madre (Mother Alp), and is currently divided among three provinces: Vicenza to the west, Treviso to the south and Belluno to the northeast. It is the highest peak of a small massif, which also includes many other peaks such as Col Moschin, Colle della Berretta, Monte Asolone, Monte Pertica, Prassolan, Monti Solaroli, Fontana Secca, Monte Peurna, Monte Santo, Monte Tomatico, Meatte, Monte Pallon, and Monte Tomba.

In September 2021, UNESCO announced that Monte Grappa would become one of 20 new biosphere reserves as part of their Man and the Biosphere Programme.

== Geomorphology ==
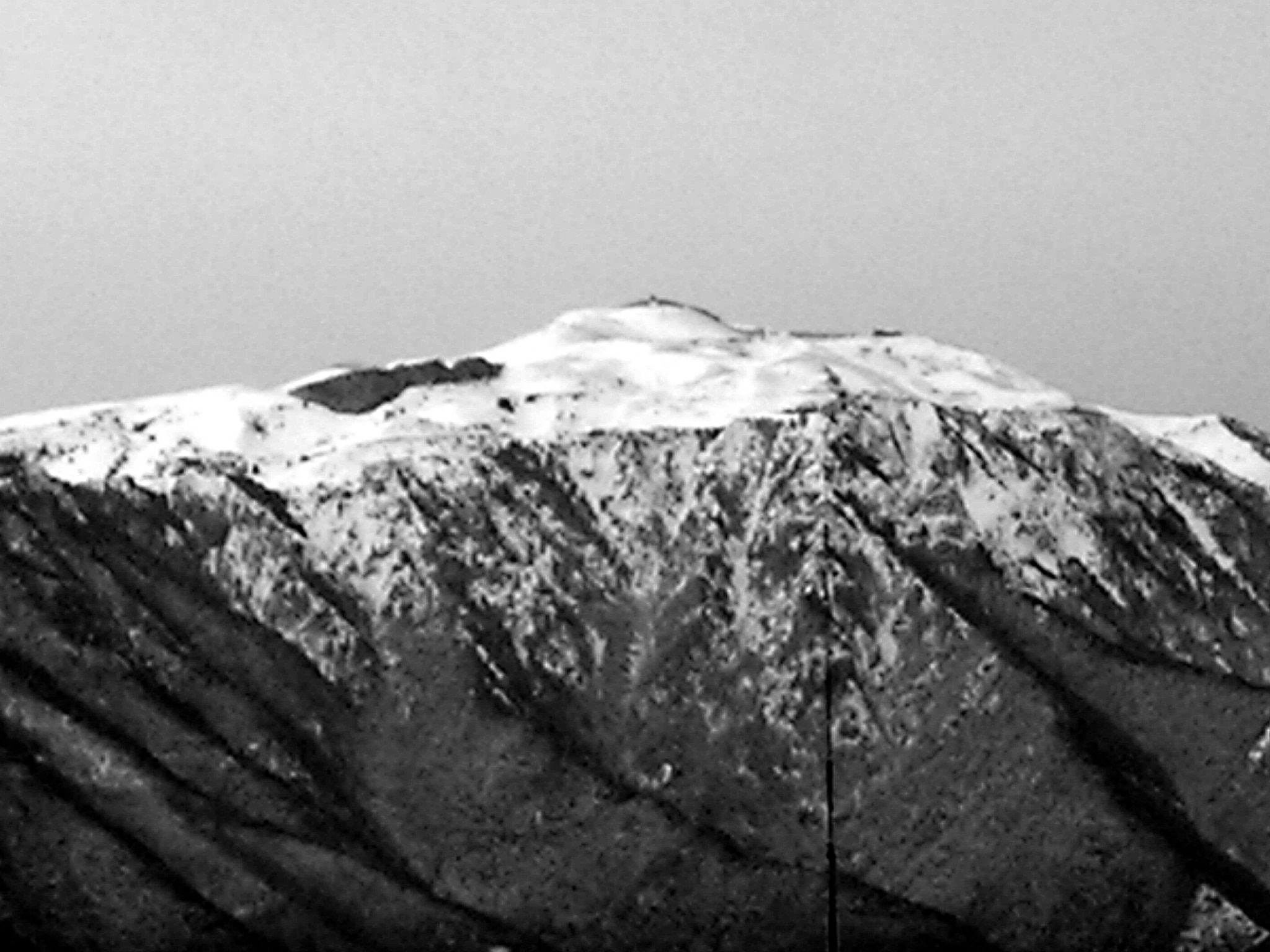
Southern Flank of Monte Grappa

The Grappa Massif was formed almost ten million years ago. It was created by the collision between the African and European lithospheric plates. Over the millennia, these sediments have been interested by a cementification and then they were lifted up by pressures that caused the Alpine mountain range to rise. Nowadays, the main types of rocks found on the Grappa are:

- The Grey Limestones: the oldest formation, comprising the biggest part of the massif: it is found on the cliff faces. Its calcareous composition has caused such an expanded karst phenomenon that brought to light a lot of caves full of stalactites, deep wells and caves;
- the Rosso Ammonitico: with its calcareous origin, it forms the “cities of stone” situated in the Poise and Meda Valleys;
- the Biancone: a calcareous rock which is found on the summit and around the villages of Borso and Semonzo;
- the Red Flake: a clayish limestone that is also the raw material used to make cement.

Furthermore, over the centuries, different external atmospheric pressures have modified the morphological structure of the Grappa Massif.

- the glaciers, which are responsible for the high valleys of the Brenta and Piave rivers. They also caused the formation of the glacial cirques near the summit.
- the streams, which have been caused by erosion from rainwater.
- The karst phenomenon, that is really extensive in the massif. There are a lot of caves and wells, sinkholes and swallow holes, the absence of streams and sources at high altitudes and the "cities of stone".

== Flora ==
Due to its geographic position near the Venetian plain, the Monte Grappa area is very rich in both flowers and plants. In fact, its climatic conditions has favoured the prevalence of small Mediterranean scrub bushes and alpine vegetation that is composed mostly of conifers in the snowy areas. Typical trees and bushes on Monte Grappa include maple (Acer pseudoplatanus) and lime (Tilia platyphyllos), the fir tree (Abies concolor), the spruce fir and the beech tree, with various geophytes underneath. Typical forest flowers include: dandelions (Leontodon tenuiflorus), Knautia persicina, Globularia nudicaulis, peony (Paeonia officinalis), the rare iris (Iris cengialti), Soldanella and Clematis. Typical pasture grasses include: Festuca paniculata and Helictotrichon parlatorei, and on the cliffs Minuartia graminifolia can be found.

== Fauna ==
The Grappa Massif is also rich in fauna. Common species include roe deer, mouflon, and chamois; there are birds of prey such as the buzzard, the peregrine falcon, the golden eagle and the eagle owl, and squirrels, foxes, badgers, and lizards can all be found on its slopes.

== History ==
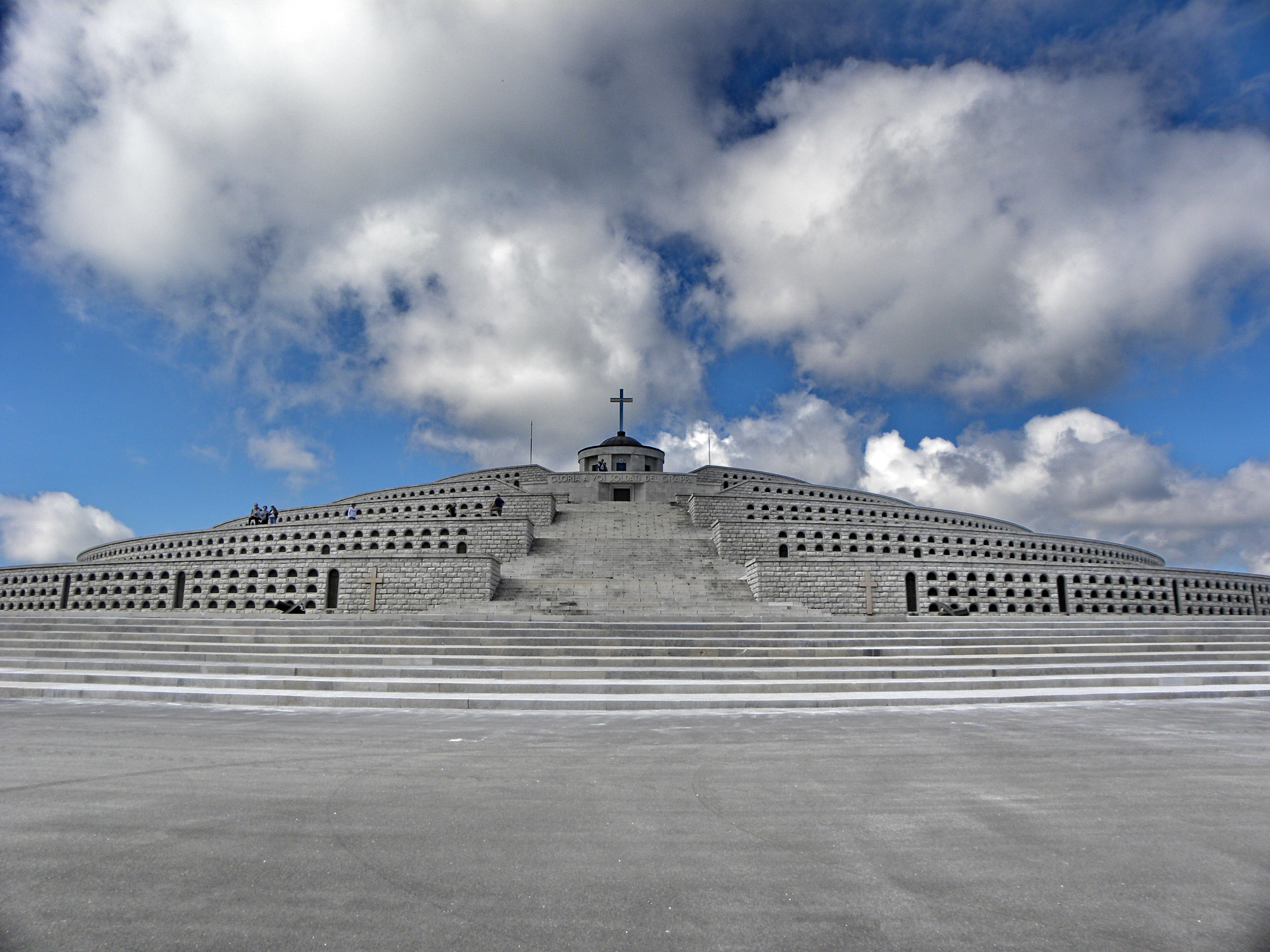
The World War I ossuary

During World War I and World War II some important events took place on Monte Grappa, and a memorial monument, the statue of the Madonna del Grappa (ruined during World War II but restored in the following years), and a World War Museum lie on the mountain. The remains of Italian and Austro-Hungarian soldiers who died in war are kept here.

During World War I, after the Italian Caporetto defeat, Monte Grappa became the most important pillar of Italian defence, and Austrians tried many times to conquer the peak to spread on the Venetian plain from November 11, 1917, to October 24, 1918. The Italians made caves in the rock and built fixed emplacements for the artillery so that they could keep control from the Valderoa Mount to Caprile hill. During the 3rd Battle of Monte Grappa the Austro-Hungarian forces would be defeated and would collapse (Battle of Vittorio Veneto).

During World War II, Italy signed the Armistice of Cassibile with USA and UK on 3 September 1943. Some days later, Wehrmacht troops invaded Italy (Operation Achse). An Italian resistance movement came up, and the Nazis fought them and civilists cruelly. Groups of Partisans sought refuge on Monte Grappa. There Wehrmacht soldiers killed a large number of them, and those who had not been killed in battle were publicly hanged at Bassano del Grappa.

Post war, NATO built a radar missile base on Monte Grappa for US anti-aircraft defense. It was demolished in the 1970s.

=== The Military Memorial Monument ===
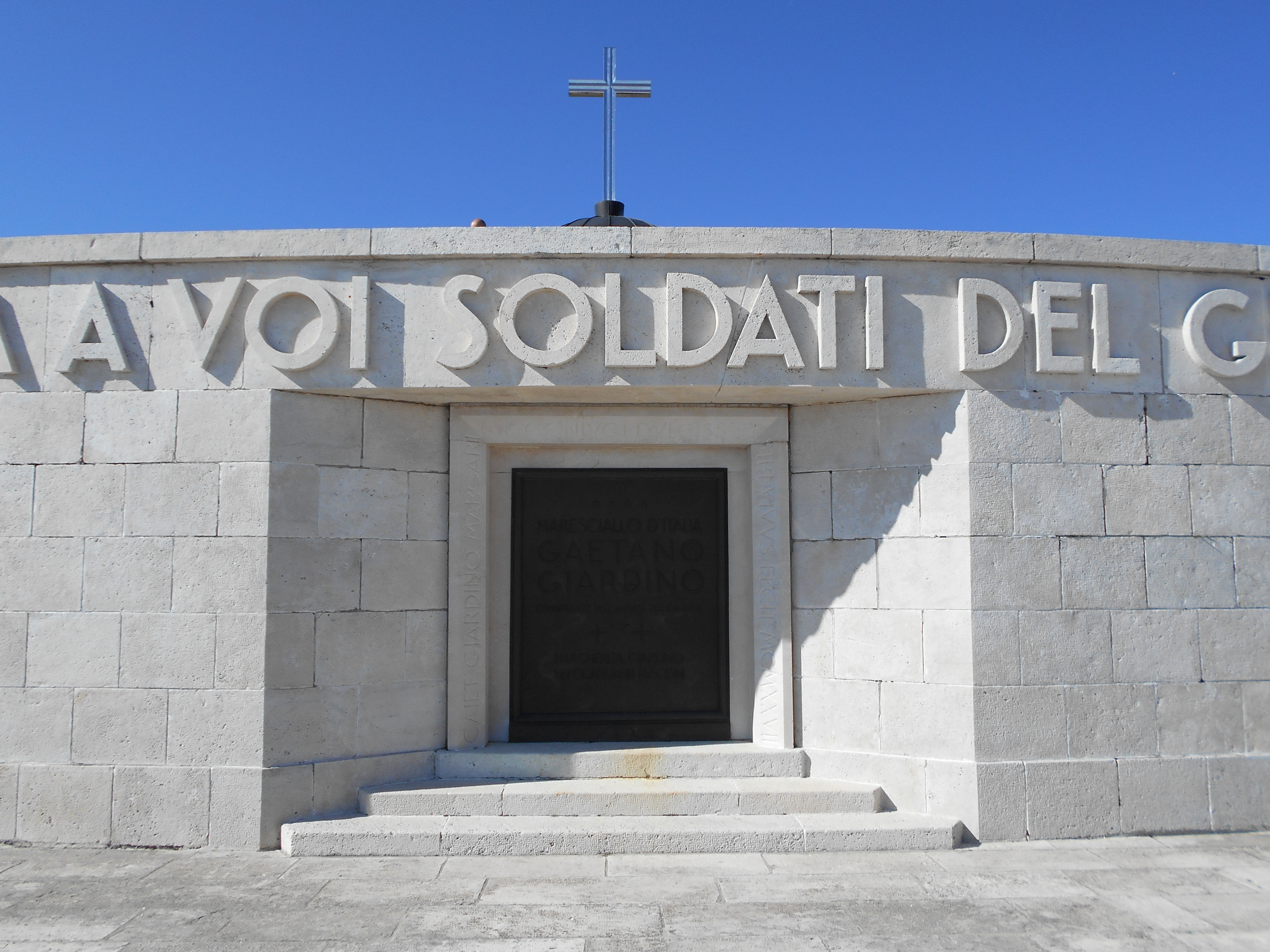
Detail of the Monte Grappa Sacrario militare

On the summit of Monte Grappa there is a military memorial monument and ossuary, designed by the architect Giovanni Greppi in collaboration with the sculptor Giannino Castiglioni. King Victor Emanuel III inaugurated it on 22 September 1935. In the central body lie the remains of 12,615 soldiers, of these the identities of 10,332 are unknown. The monument is composed of five concentric circles laid on top of each other to form a pyramid. On the top there is the little sanctuary of the Madonnina del Grappa.

Near the monument, there is a cave where some people believe that some Partisans had been burnt alive by the Nazi-fascists. Since 1974 there has been a statue called Al Partigiano in that cave, made by the sculptor Augusto Murer.

== Depiction in media ==
Monte Grappa is depicted in the video game Battlefield 1 in the multiplayer map Monte Grappa and in the single player campaign story "Avanti Savoia" which both take place during the Battle of Monte Grappa.

In the video game Isonzo, one of the multiplayer maps takes place on the mountain during the Battle of Monte Grappa.

== See also ==
- Morlacco
- Military Memorial of Monte Grappa
- Battle of Monte Grappa
