= Lierna Castle =

- Castello di Lierna
- Lierna, Lake Como
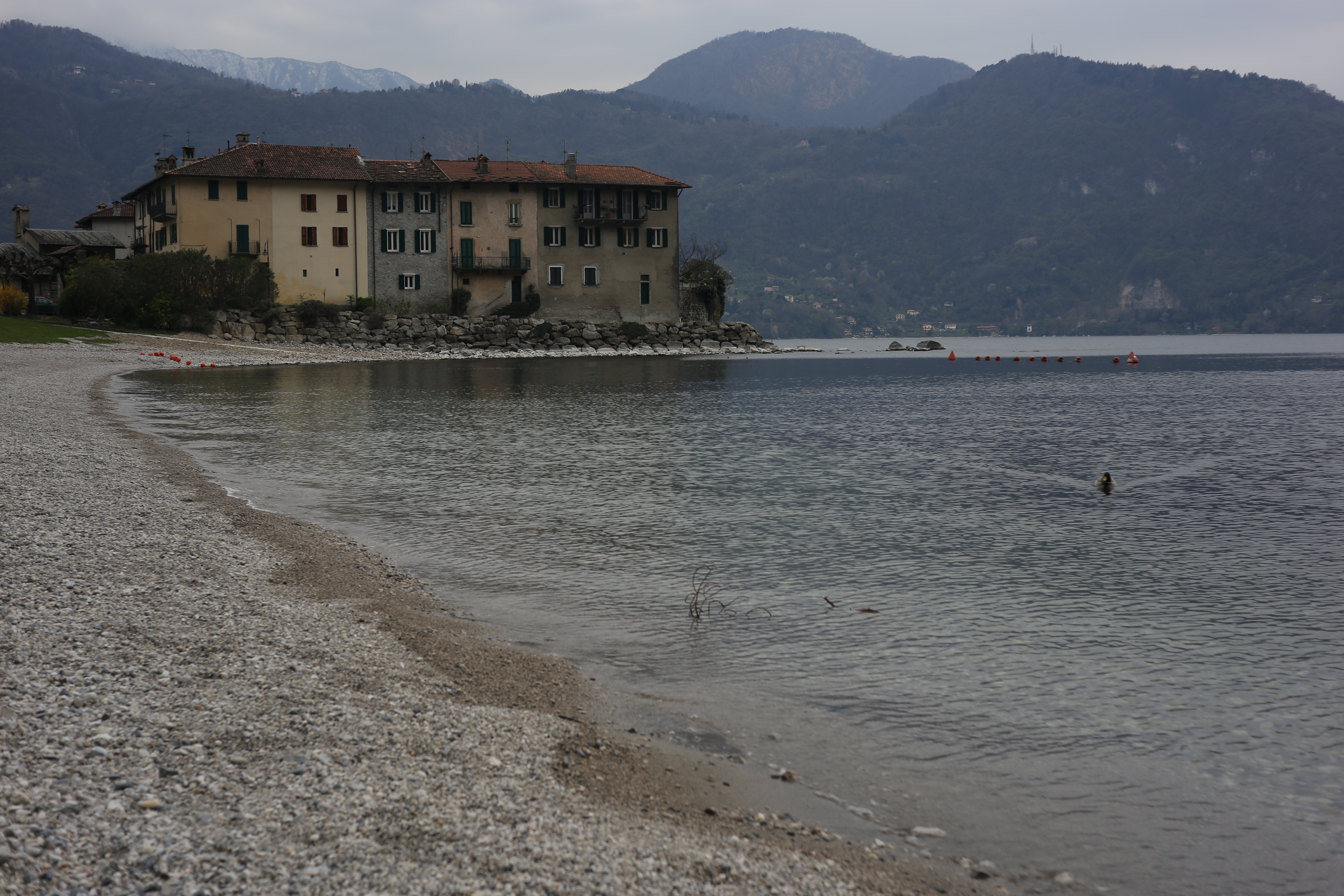

Site information
- Type: medieval castle
- Owner: private and public museum
- Open to the public: in part
- Condition: restored
- Other site facilities: residential

Location
- Coordinates: 45°57′57″N 9°18′04″E

Site history
- Built: 10th century CE
- Materials: stone and mortar
- Fate: military use until 16th century CE; civilian use since
- Battles/wars: Como-Milan War
- Events: 1124 besieged by Milan; 1524 captured by Graubünden

Lierna Castle (Italian: Castello di Lierna) is a castle on the eastern side of Lake Como in Lombardy, Italy. The castle is built on a peninsula that protrudes into the lake and consists of a group of connected buildings, rather than a single building. The main portion of the current buildings was constructed in the 10th century in Romanesque style upon former Roman ruins. The castle includes the 11th-century church of Saints Maurice and Lazarus (Chiesa dei Santi Maurizio e Lazzaro), associated with the Order of Saints Maurice and Lazarus.

The castle is occupied by the people of the frazione of Castello in the comune of Lierna. It is the northwesternmost of the eleven frazioni of Lierna comune.

== History ==
The last military use of the castle was in the mid-16th century by Gian Giacomo Medici, known as "Medeghino" (the "small Medici"), who was primarily a mercenary.
