= Ugo Cei =

Italian politician

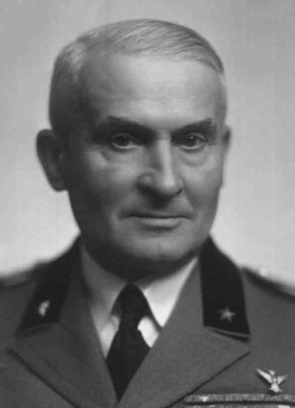
Ugo Cei

Ugo Cei (Castelfranco Emilia, 1 October 1867 – Cella Monte, 17 April 1953) was an Italian general and politician, who particularly distinguished himself during the First World War as brigade commander. In February 1935 he was appointed extraordinary Commissioner for honors for those who had died in war in Italy and abroad, and on March 25, 1939 he was made a Senator of the Kingdom. His decorations included the Knight Grand Cross and Officer of the Military Order of Savoy, three Medals of Military Valor and the War Cross of Military Valor.

== Early life ==
He was born in Castelfranco Emilia, in the province of Modena, on 1 October 1867, the son of Scipione and Luigia Vallino Baietta. After enlisting in the Royal Army in 1885 he began to attend the Royal Military Academy of Modena, from which he graduated with the rank of second lieutenant assigned to the infantry. Promoted to lieutenant, in 1898 he was in service with the 14th Infantry Regiment “Pinerolo”, then under the command of Major General Francesco Pistoia.

In 1902 he attended the courses of the Army School of War, and in 1911-1912 he participated in the Italian-Turkish war as a major of the 7th Infantry Regiment, distinguishing himself in the battle of Ettangi, after which he was decorated with his first Silver Medal for military valor.

He was promoted to colonel, during the First World War, from 29 November 1915 to 22 May 1916, and from 3 July 1916 to 15 April 1917 he was Deputy Chief of Staff of the 2nd Army, serving under Lieutenant General Pietro Frugoni and then Settimio Piacentini. Promoted colonel brigadier on 8 April 1917 he assumed command of the newly established Lecce Brigade, which he maintained until November of the same year, when the brigade was temporarily dissolved following the defeat of Caporetto. During the period in which he exercised his command he was decorated with two silver medals for military valor. Promoted to brigadier general on 15 June 1918 he assumed command of the Abruzzi Brigade, which he maintained until 23 September of the same year, being decorated with the Officer Cross of the military order of Savoy and a War Cross for military valor.

In 1919 he took part in the Albania campaign, and then he was alternate judge of the Supreme Court of War and Navy from 18 July to 26 September 1920. Having become general of division, on 2 December 1928 he was appointed commander of the territorial division of Genoa.

== Later career ==
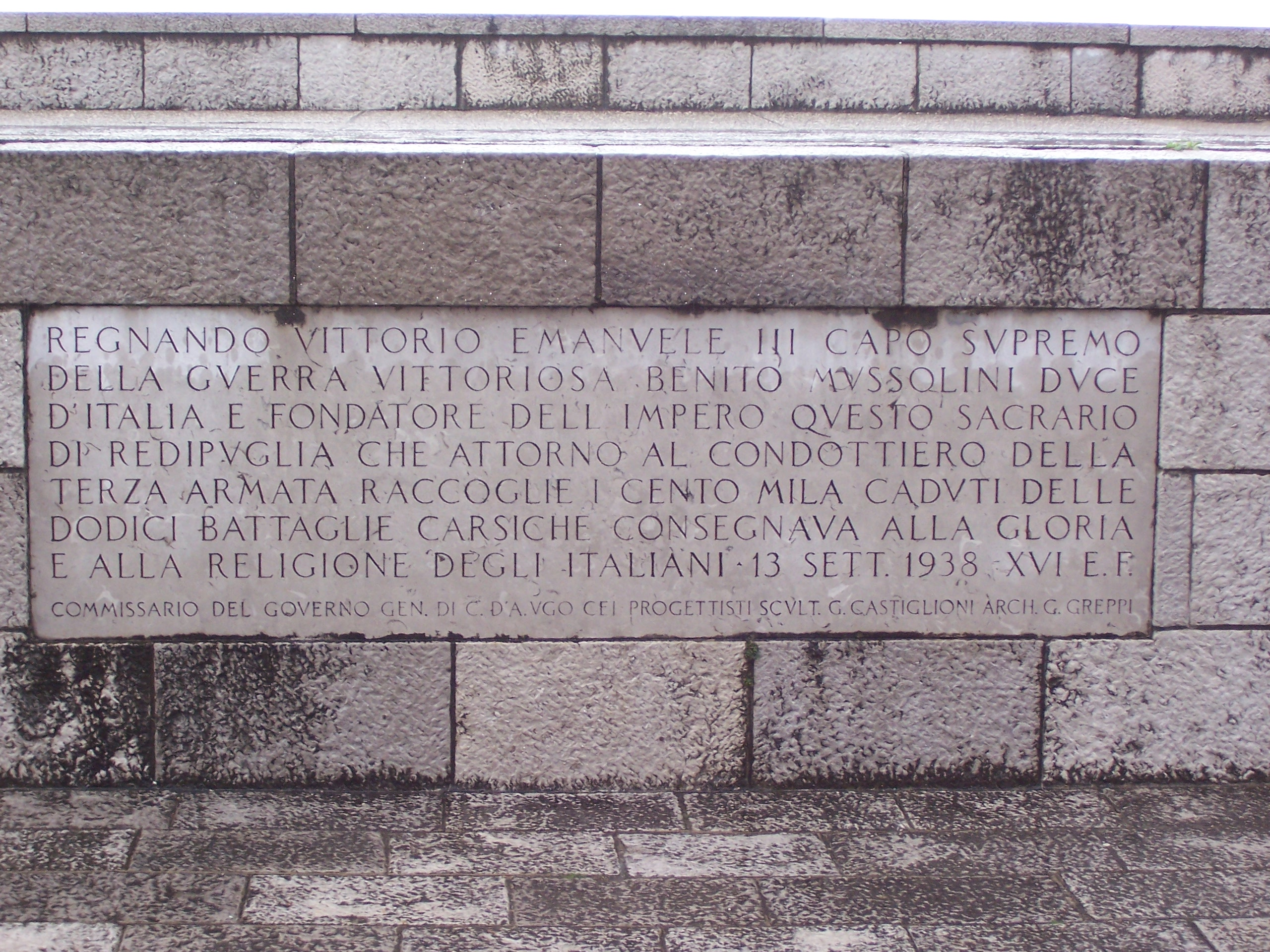
Commemorative stone bearing Ugo Cei’s name at Redipuglia

In 1932 he was personally appointed by Benito Mussolini as Commissioner for the Military Memorial of Monte Grappa. Promoted to general in the army corps on 22 July 1933, in February 1935 he was appointed extraordinary commissioner of the government for honors for those who died in war in Italy and abroad. Appointed Senator of the Kingdom of Italy on 25 March 1939, he became a Member of the Commission for Italian African Affairs from 17 April, remaining there until 5 August 1943.

After the fall of the fascist regime following the Italian Liberation War, his close links with the Mussolini regime cost him his expulsion from the Senate. On 7 August 1944 he was referred to the High Court of Justice for the sanctions against Fascism with the 6th degree charge: "Senators held responsible for maintaining fascism and making war possible both with their votes and with individual actions, including propaganda carried out inside and outside the Senate". The order removing him from the senate bears the date of August 30, 1945, made definitive on July 8, 1948 by a sentence of the Court of cassation.

He resided for much of his life in Milan, at 18 via San Giovanni sul Muro. He died at the age of 85, on April 17, 1953, in Cella Monte, in the province of Alessandria.

== Honors ==
- Knight of the Military Order of Savoy - September 30, 1912.
- Officer of the military order of Savoy - June 10, 1920.
