= Redipuglia War Memorial =

World War I memorial in the Friuli-Venezia Giulia region of Italy

- Sacrario militare di Redipuglia
- Italy
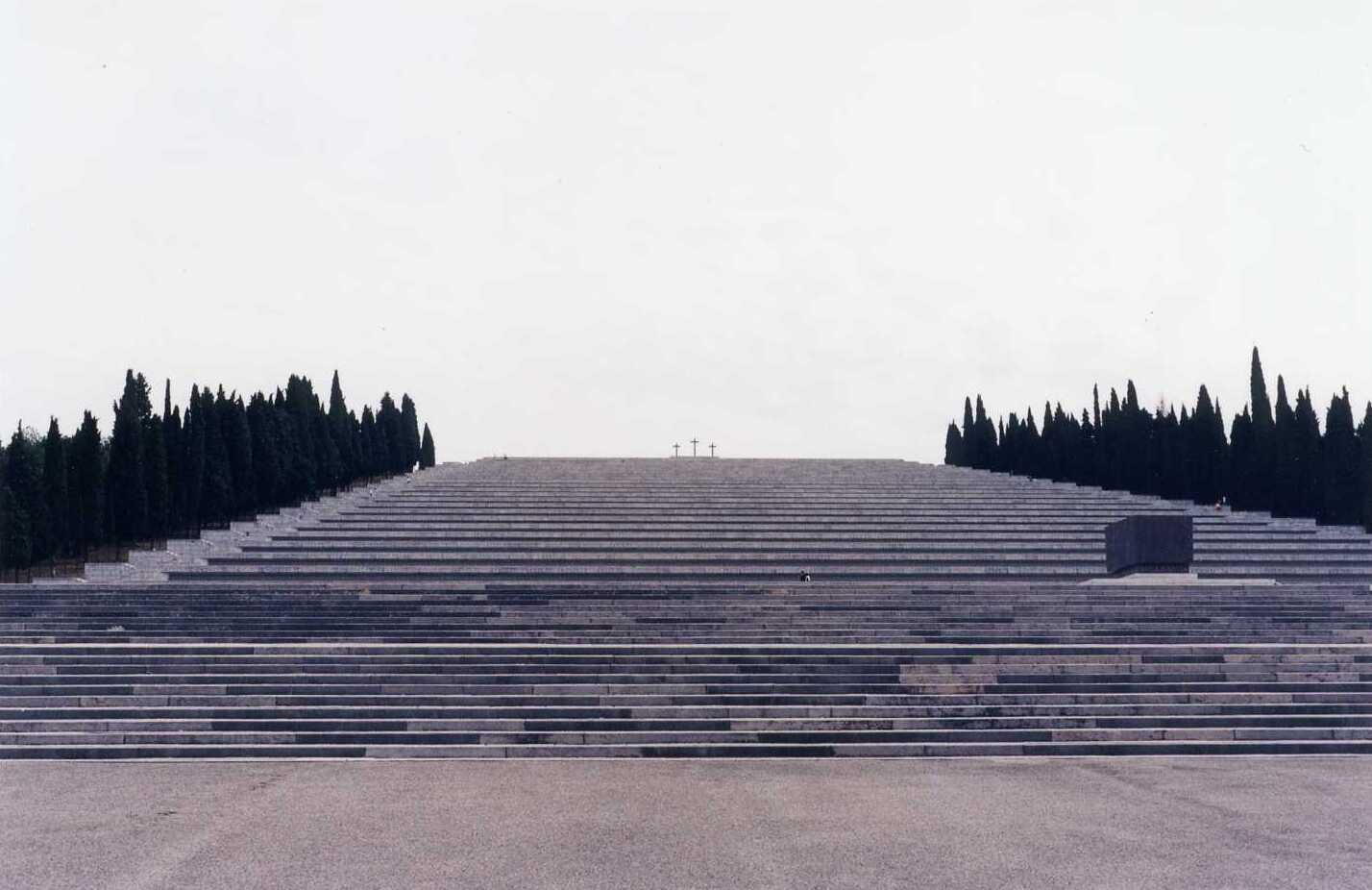
- For Italian soldiers killed in the battles of the Isonzo in World War I
- Unveiled: 18 September 1938 (inaugurated)
- Location: 45.8521°N 13.4908°E near Fogliano Redipuglia
- Designed by: Giovanni Greppi

The Redipuglia War Memorial (Italian: Sacrario militare di Redipuglia) is a World War I memorial located on the Karst Plateau near the village of Fogliano Redipuglia, in the Friuli-Venezia Giulia region of northeastern Italy. It is the largest war memorial in Italy and one of the largest in the world, housing the remains of 100,187 Italian soldiers killed between 1915 and 1917 in the twelve battles fought on the Karst and Isonzo front.

== Memorial ==
The shrine was built between 1935 and 1938 on Monte Sei Busi, one of the many rocky hills of the Karst Plateau whose possession was bitterly contested during the early battles of the Isonzo (Monte Sei Busi was attacked by the Italian Army during the First and Second Battle of the Isonzo, and finally captured during the Fourth Battle of the Isonzo). It was designed by architect Giovanni Greppi and solemnly inaugurated on 18 September 1938 in the presence of Benito Mussolini and over 50,000 soldiers who had fought on the Isonzo front in World War I. The Colle di Sant'Elia, a hill in front of Monte Sei Busi, was already the site of the war cemetery of the Italian Third Army, which fought in this sector of the front from 1915 to 1917 (the cemetery contained the remains of over 30,000 fallen, which were transferred to the newly built war memorial).

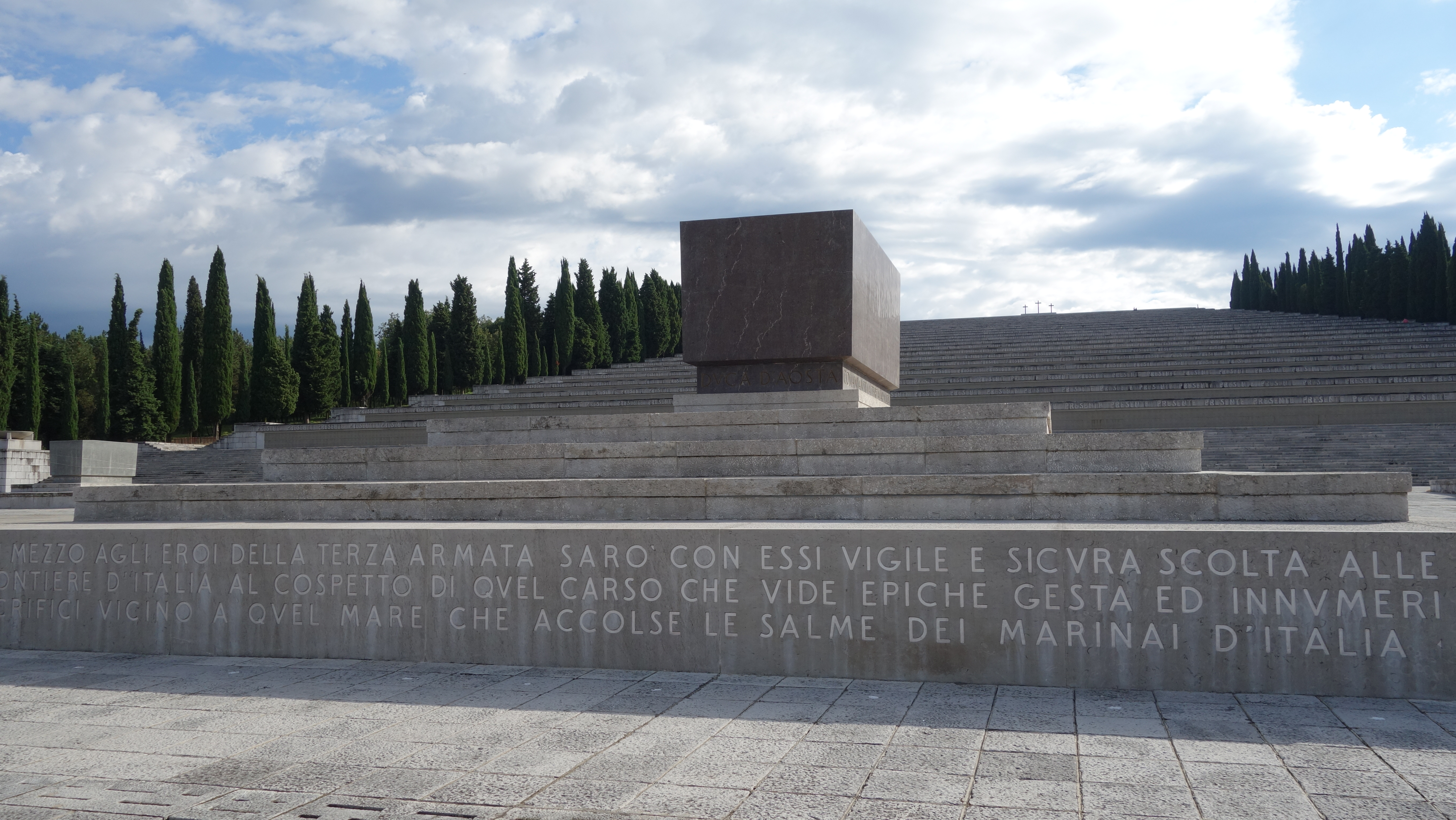
The Redipuglia War Memorial of Redipuglia, with the tomb of Prince Emanuele Filiberto, Duke of Aosta in the foreground, nicknamed the Undefeated Duke for having reported numerous victories in the First World War without ever being defeated on the battlefield.

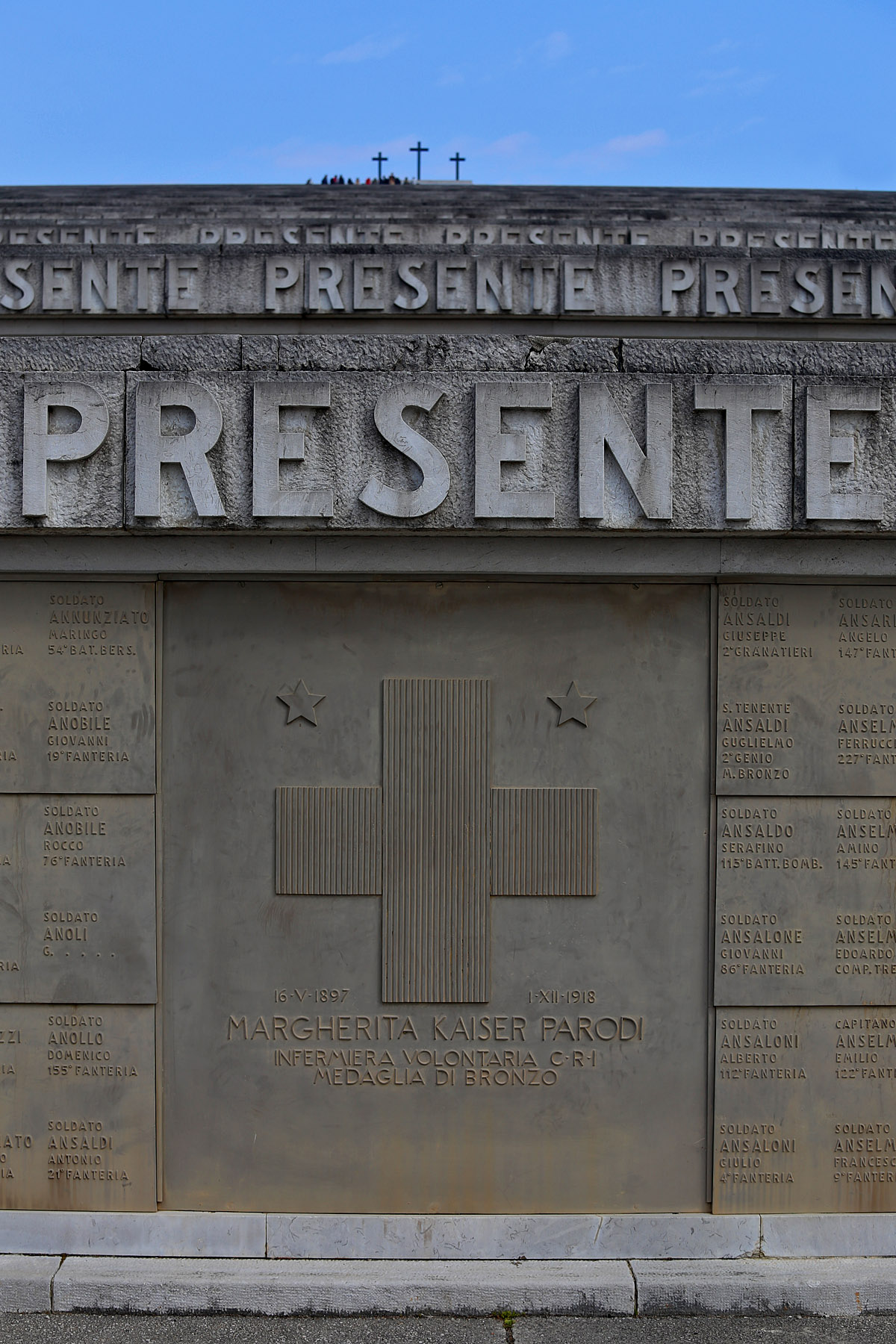
Tomb of Margherita Kaiser Parodi with PRESENTE in sans-serif font.

The shrine, built on the side of the hill, consists of 22 horizontal platforms of stone, arrayed in step-like progression, hosting the remains of 39,857 identified soldiers, arranged in alphabetic order. The top frieze of each platforms, above the name plaques, reads repetitively Presente (Present). Above the last step, a votive chapel is lined by two large mass graves holding the remains of 60,330 unknown soldiers. The chapel and two adjacent rooms contain personal belongings of Italian and Austro-Hungarian soldiers. At the base of the memorial, six sepulchres contain the remains of Prince Emanuele Filiberto, Duke of Aosta (the commander of the Third Army, who died in 1931 and asked to be buried among his men) and five generals killed in action. Leading up the monument is the Via Eroica ("heroic path"), which is flanked by 38 bronze plaques with the names of 38 locations on the Karst plateau where the fighting was bloodiest. The fallen buried in the memorial, besides tens of thousands of Army soldiers, include 56 members of the Guardia di Finanza, 72 sailors (the crews of the submarines Medusa and Jalea, sunk in the Adriatic Sea in 1915 and salvaged in the 1950s), and only one woman, Margherita Kaiser Parodi Orlando, a volunteer nurse who died in 1918 while assisting soldiers sick with Spanish flu. The cemetery once had reliefs of Fasces at the base.

The hill opposite, the Colle di Sant'Elia, was formerly the site of the war cemetery of the Third Army. It has been turned into a memorial park, with memorial stones dedicated to the various branches of the Italian Army and the Italian Armed Forces, and everyday objects of the soldier (from mess kits to pincers), as well as a display of Italian and Austro-Hungarian artillery pieces. A museum with war relics, reconstructions and panels about the history of the Third Army and the battles of the Isonzo is located between Monte Sei Busi and the Colle di Sant'Elia.

The soldiers of Italy fallen during World War I are commemorated at Redipuglia on 4 November every year, by the President of the Italian Senate.

== See also ==
- The Italian Charnel House, Kobarid
- Military Memorial of Monte Grappa
- Oslavia War Memorial
