= Fogliano Redipuglia =

- Comune
- Comune di Fogliano Redipuglia
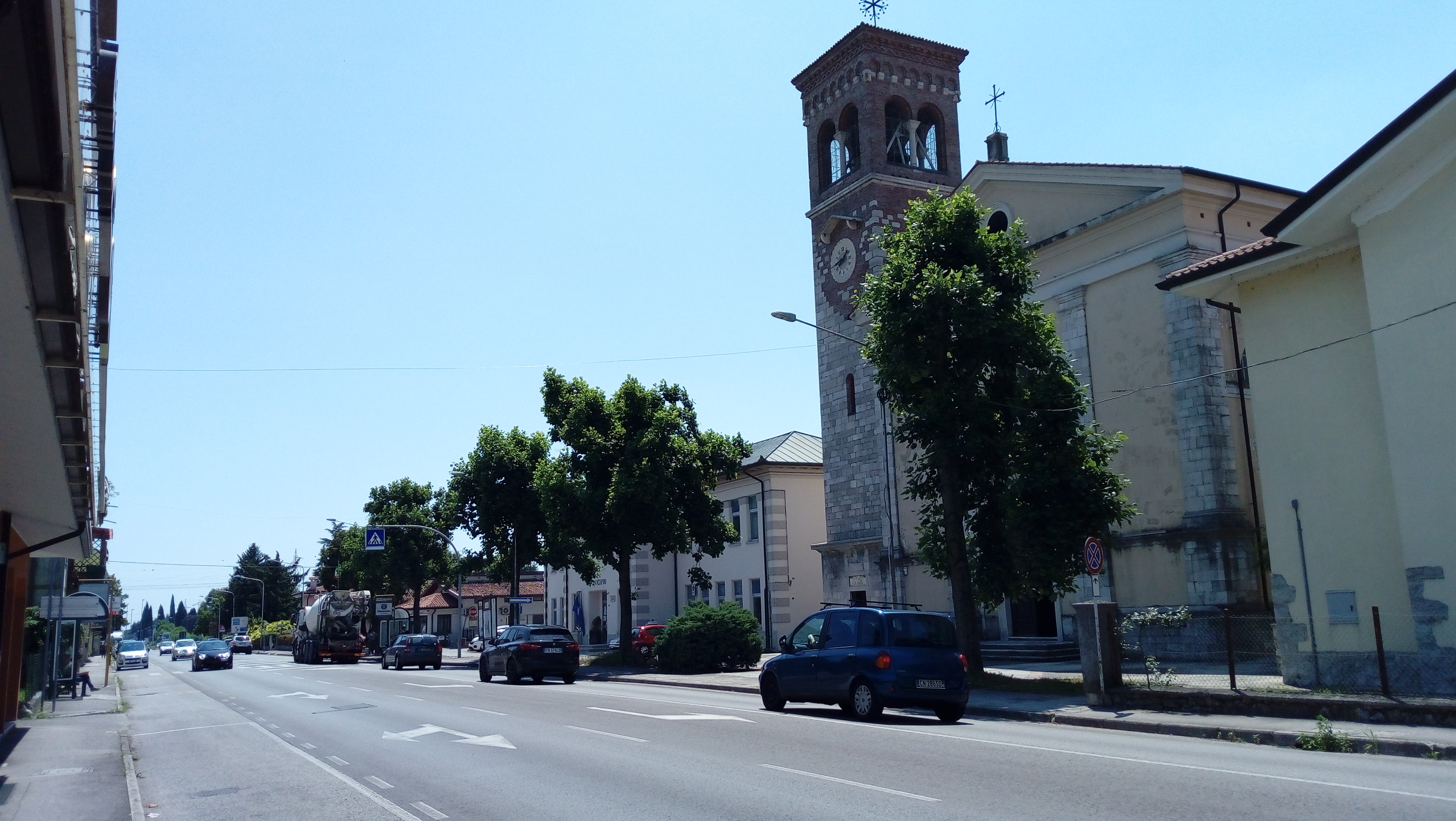

- Location within Italy Location within Friuli-Venezia Giulia
- Coordinates: 45°52′N 13°29′E
- Country: Italy
- Region: Friuli-Venezia Giulia
- Province: Gorizia (GO)
- Frazioni: Fogliano, Polazzo, Redipuglia

Government
  - Mayor: Cristiana Pisano

Area
  - Total: 7.8 km^{2} (3.0 sq mi)
- Elevation: 23 m (75 ft)

Population (28 February 2017)
  - Total: 3,058
  - Density: 390/km^{2} (1,000/sq mi)
- Time zone: UTC+1 (CET)
  - Summer (DST): UTC+2 (CEST)
- Postal code: 34070
- Dialing code: 0481
- Website: Official website

Fogliano Redipuglia (Italian: [foʎˈʎaːno rediˈpuʎʎa]; Bisiacco: Foian Redipuia; Friulian: Foian Redipulie; Slovene: Foljan-Sredipolje, German: Radepollach) is a comune (municipality) in the Regional decentralization entity of Gorizia in the Italian region of Friuli-Venezia Giulia, located about 35 kilometres (22 mi) northwest of Trieste and about 13 kilometres (8 mi) southwest of Gorizia.

Fogliano Redipuglia borders the following municipalities: Doberdò del Lago, Gradisca d'Isonzo, Ronchi dei Legionari, Sagrado, San Pier d'Isonzo, Villesse.

== World War I memorial ==
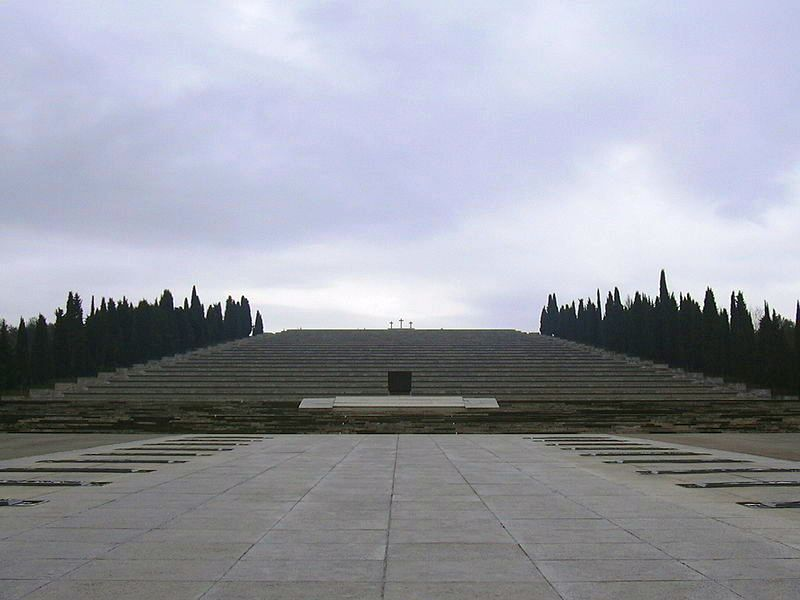
The Redipuglia War Memorial, resting place of approximately 100,000 Italian soldiers. More than 650,000 died on the battlefields of World War I

Fogliano Redipuglia lies at the eastern end of the shifting front of the Italian Campaign against Austria-Hungary (and Germany) in World War I, and today is home to Italy's largest war memorial on Monte Sei Busi in Redipuglia.

The huge war memorial from 1938 contains the corpses of 39,857 identified Italian soldiers, and 69,330 unidentified. In a nearby cemetery are buried another around 14,000 Austro-Hungarian soldiers. Trench fortifications can be seen next to the war memorial, as well as a display of large World War I artillery pieces.

Pope Francis visited Redipuglia's military memorial on 13 September 2014 to mark the centenary of World War I to pray for those who died in all wars.

== Rangers Redipuglia Baseball Club ==
Rangers Redipuglia is a baseball team in Italy's Serie B minor league based in Redipuglia. It was owned by the Potocco Furniture Company.
