= Giannino Castiglioni =

Italian sculptor

- In his workshop, circa 1925, working on the sculptures for the Palacio Legislativo of Montevideo, Uruguay
- Born: 4 May 1884; Milan, Italy
- Died: 27 August 1971 (aged 87); Lierna, Italy
- Education: Accademia di Belle Arti di Brera
- Known for: sculpture, medals
- Movement: Art Nouveau

Giannino Castiglioni (4 May 1884 – 27 August 1971) was an Italian sculptor and medallist. He worked mostly in monumental and funerary sculpture; his style was representational, and far from the modernist and avant-garde trends of the early twentieth century.

== Life ==
Art Nouveau silver medallion for the Milan International Exhibition 1906; the obverse shows the Simplon Tunnel

Giannino Castiglioni was born on 4 May 1884 in Milan, the son of Giacomo Castiglioni and Piera Bergamaschi. His father was director of the Stefano Johnson mint in that city.

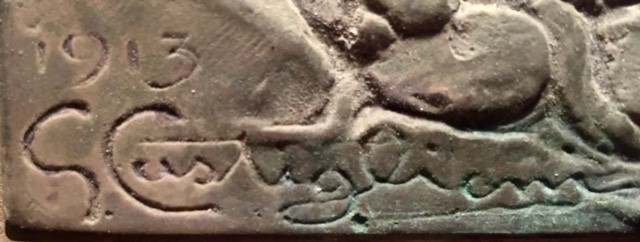
Giannino Castiglioni's signature

Castiglioni studied sculpture under Enrico Butti at the Accademia di Belle Arti di Brera in Milan. He first exhibited at the Milan International Exhibition in 1906, where he showed medals, a plaster statue and a painting. Castiglioni first opened a large studio on the Corso di Porta Nuova, and in 1927 he opened a second studio at his house in Lierna, on Lake Como.

He married Livia Bolla, with whom he had four children: Livio (b. 1911), Pier Giacomo (b. 1913) and Achille (b. 1918). A daughter named Piera died in her infancy and is memorialised with a funerary sculpture by her father.

He died in Lierna on 27 August 1971.

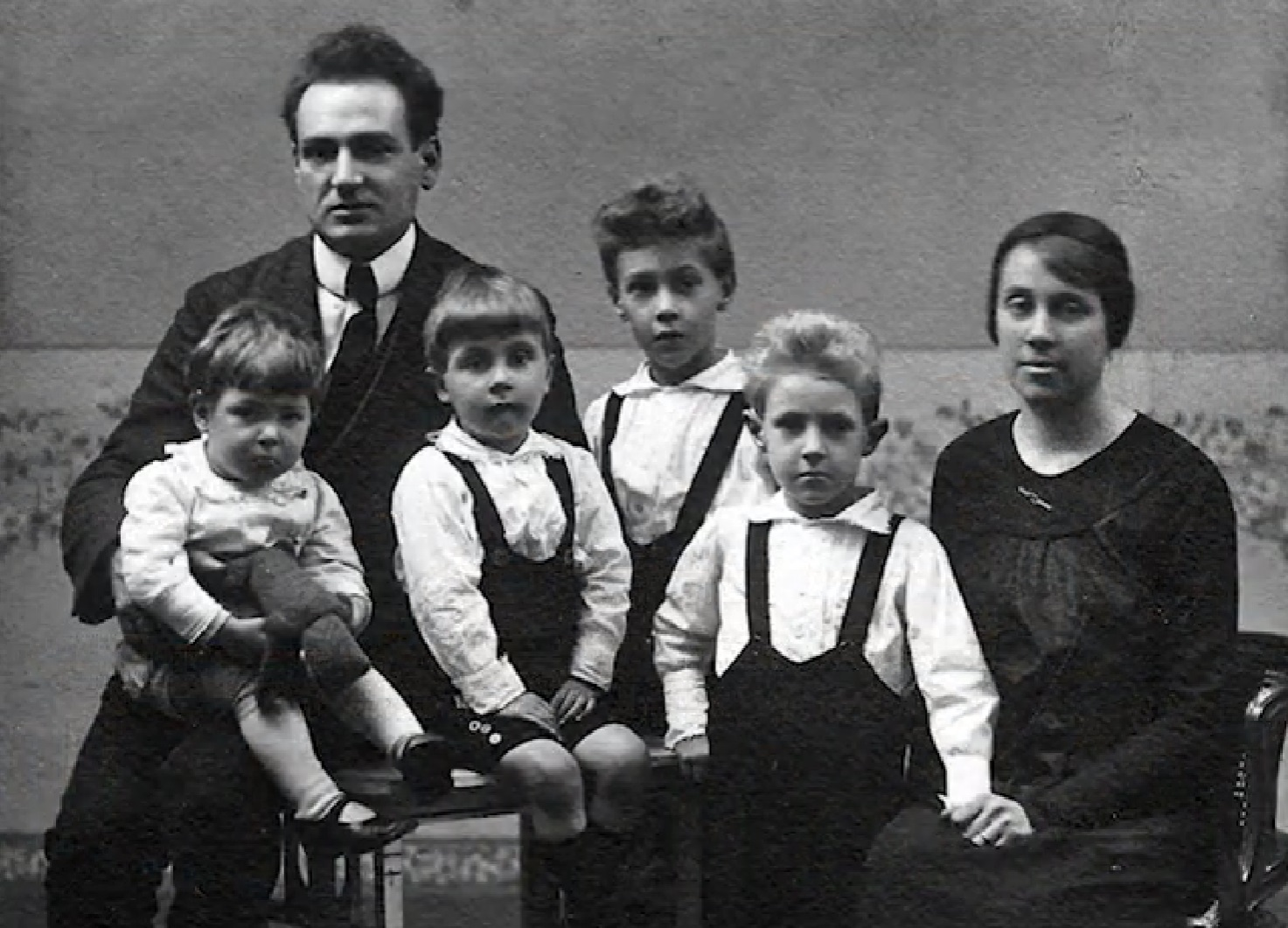
Castiglioni family portrait with sons Achille, Livio, and Pier Giacomo (1922)

== Work ==
From 1922 until 1928 Castiglioni worked on the plaster casts for friezes and monumental sculptures for the Palacio Legislativo of Montevideo, Uruguay; these were shipped to Uruguay, and the bronze or marble sculptures were made there. In the Fascist era he worked on sculptures for war cemeteries and monuments to the dead of the First World War, including: the military memorial of Monte Grappa (1935) in the Veneto; the Tempio Ossario di Timau (1937) in the comune of Paluzza, Udine; the military ossuary of Caporetto, now Kobarid, Slovenia; and the war memorial of Redipuglia (1938) in the province of Gorizia. In 1941 he made the tomb of Pope Pius XI in the Vatican Grottoes.

== Reception ==
Castiglioni won the competition for the prize medal at the Milan International Exhibition in 1906. In 1922 he won the international competition to provide sculptures for the Palacio Legislativo of Montevideo. He left more than three hundred of his preparatory plaster casts to the comune of Lierna; a museum is to house them is under construction.

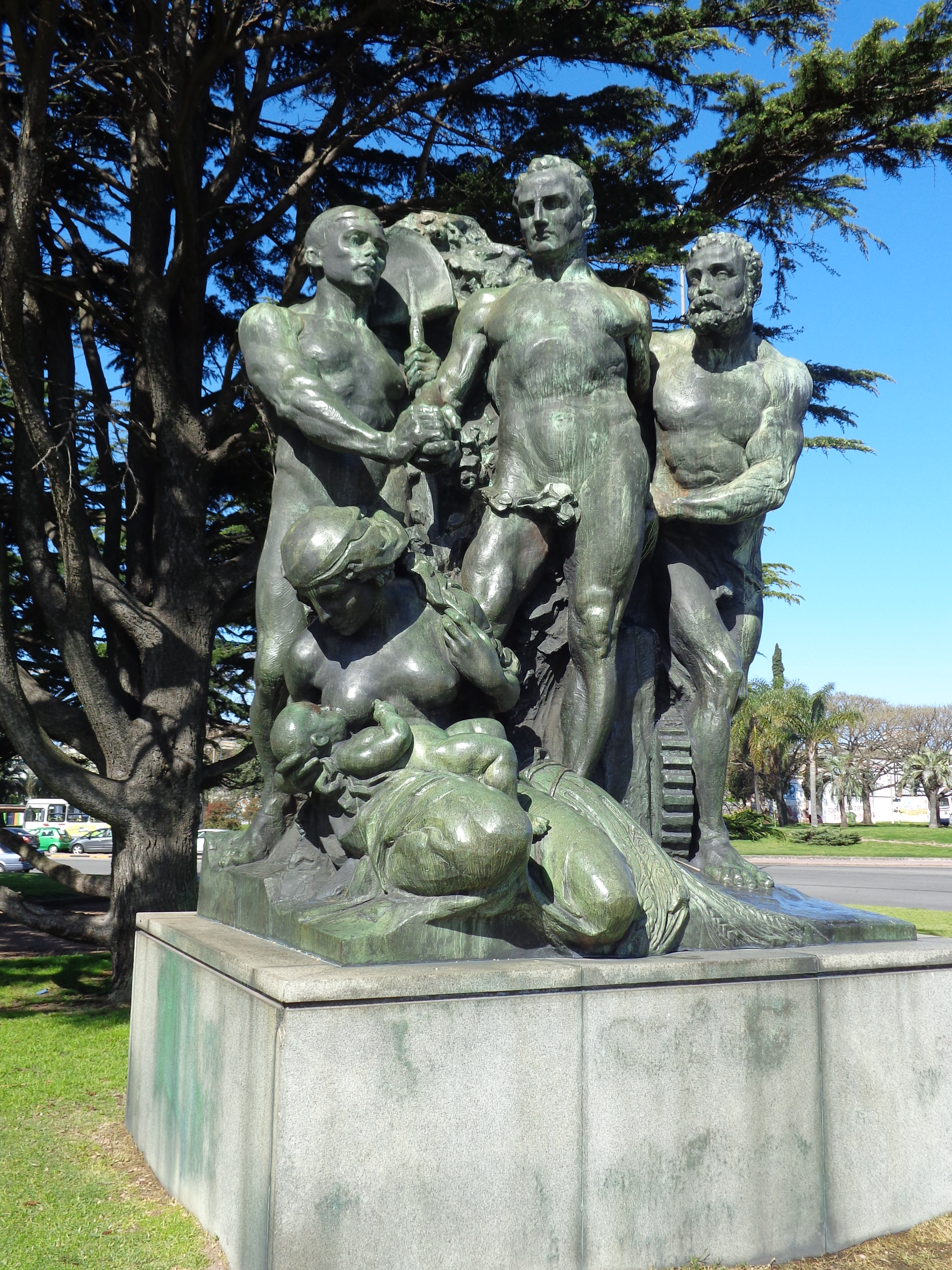
El trabajo, bronze, Palacio Legislativo, Montevideo, Uruguay

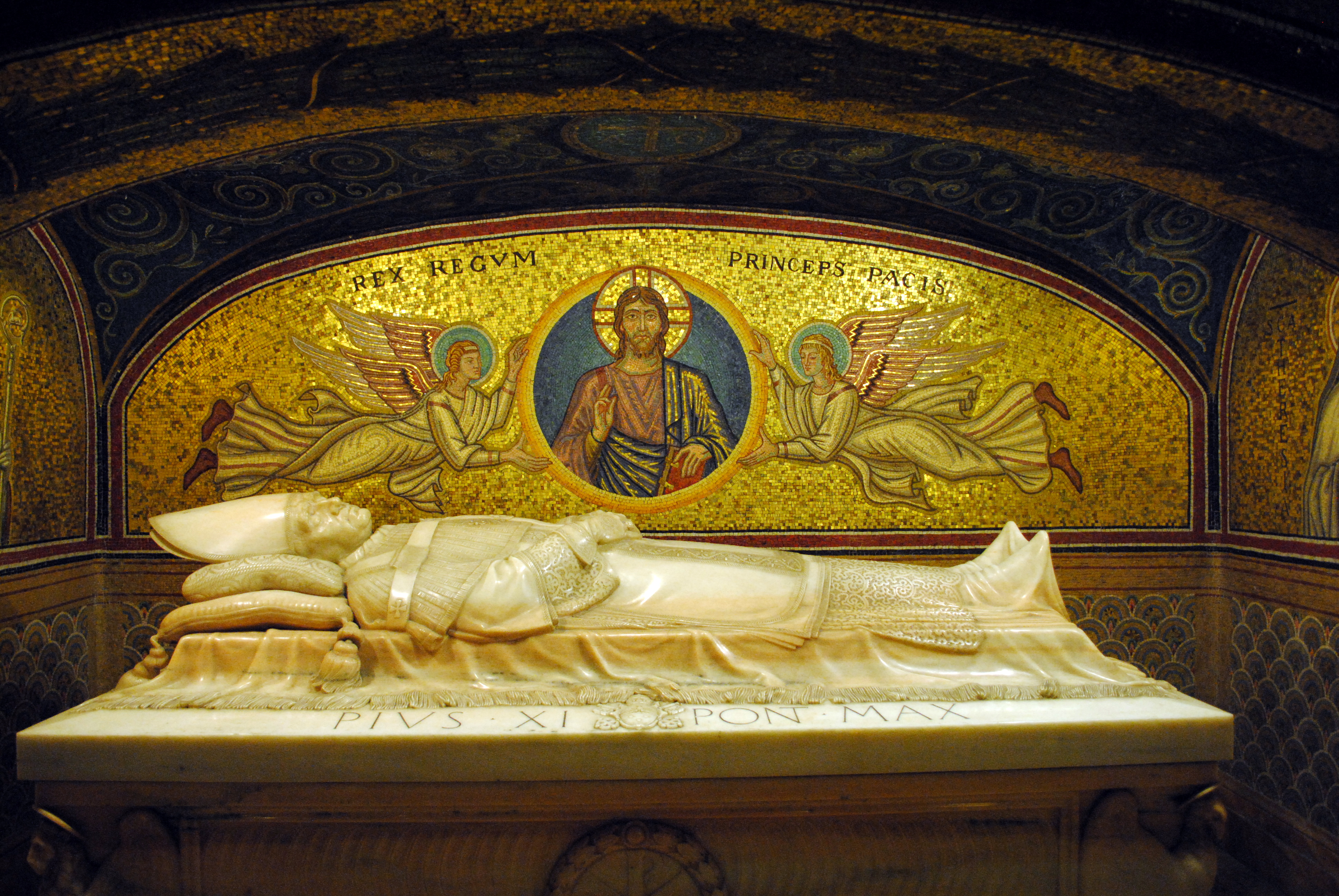
Tomb of Pius XI, St. Peter's, Rome

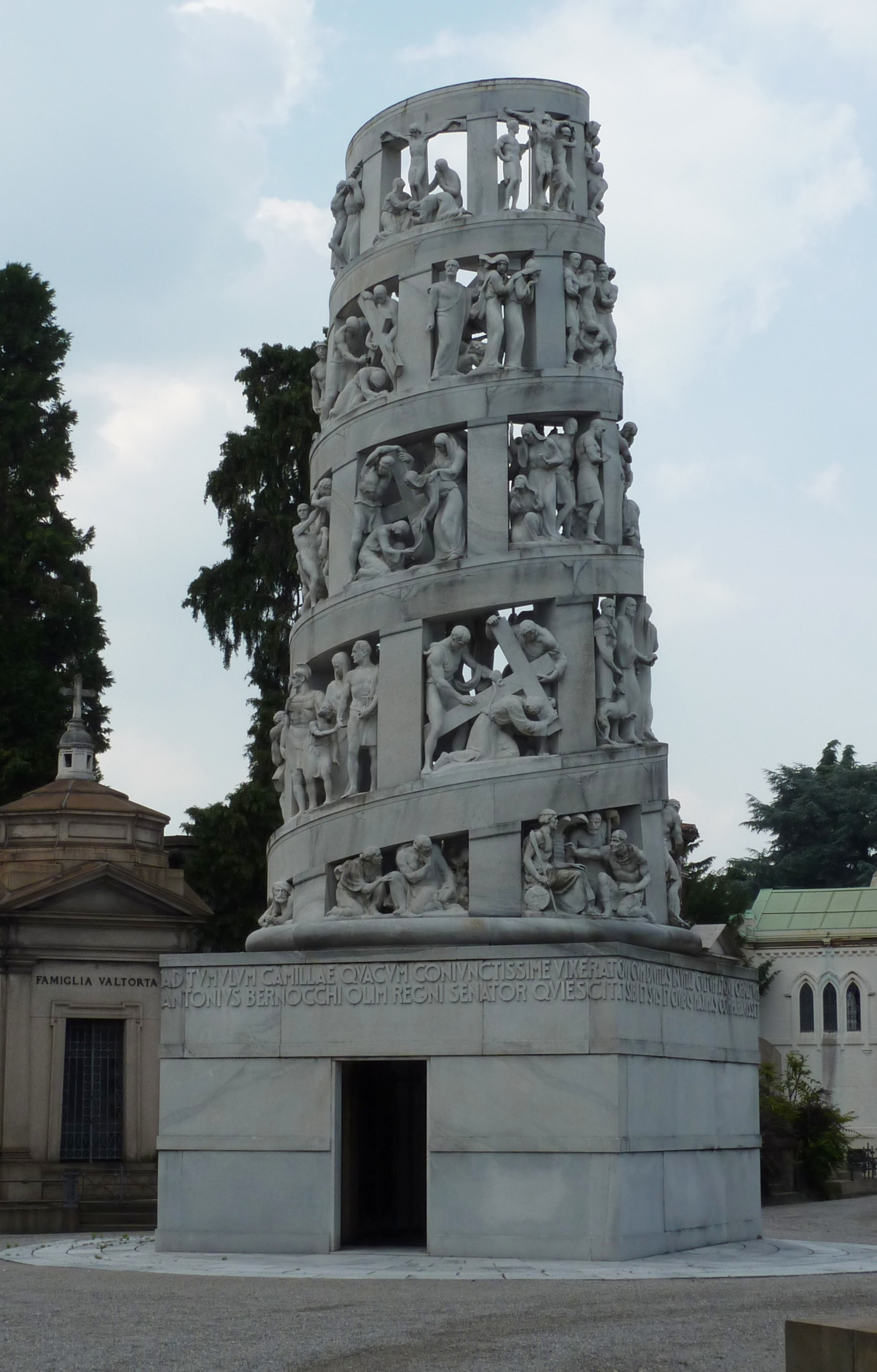
Tomb of Antonio Bernocchi, Cimitero Monumentale di Milano
