= Volče, Tolmin =

Settlement in Slovenian Littoral, Slovenia

Volče
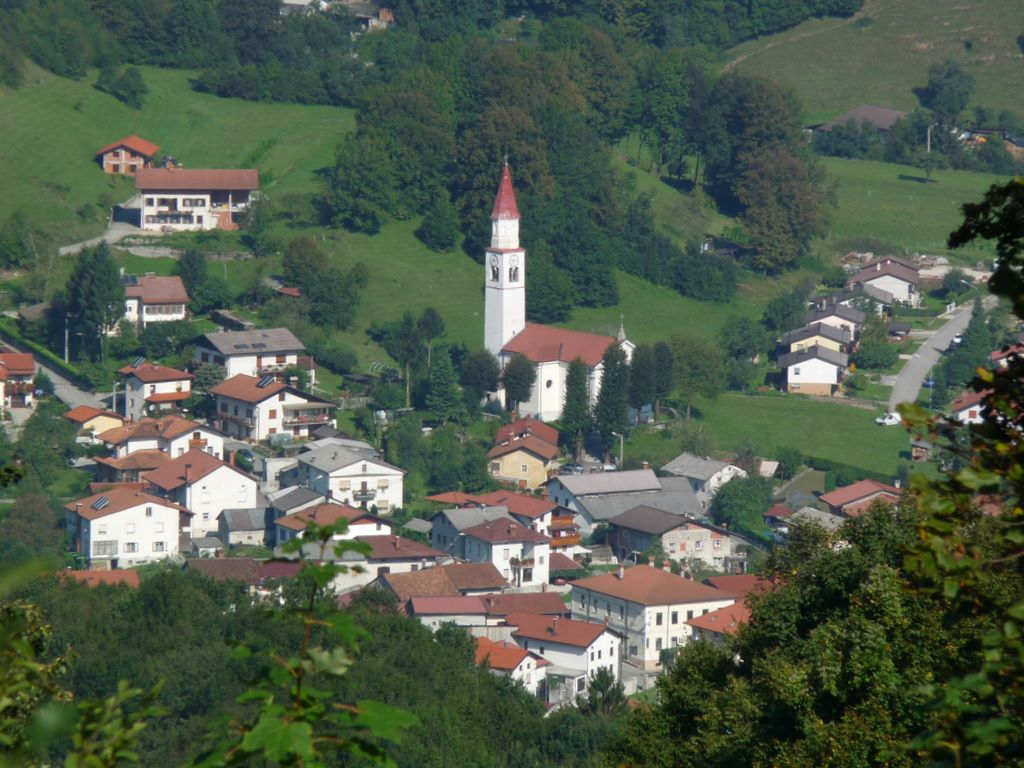

- Location in Slovenia
- Coordinates: 46°10′27.27″N 13°42′43.1″E
- Country: Slovenia
- Traditional region: Slovenian Littoral
- Statistical region: Gorizia
- Municipality: Tolmin

Area
  - Total: 14.6 km^{2} (5.6 sq mi)
- Elevation: 198 m (650 ft)

Population (2020)
  - Total: 548
  - Density: 38/km^{2} (98/sq mi)
- Time zone: UTC+1 (CET)
  - Summer (DST): UTC+2 (CEST)
- Postal code: 5220

Volče (pronounced [ˈʋoːu̯tʃɛ]; Italian: Volzana) is a settlement on the right bank of the Soča River in the Municipality of Tolmin in the Littoral region of northwestern Slovenia, close to the border with Italy.

== Name ==
Volče was attested in historical sources as Volzana in 1295, Olza in 1338, Walçana in 1340, and Volzane in 1341. The name is derived from the plural demonym *Volčane based on the given name *Vьlkъ, thus originally meaning 'Volk's people' or 'residents of Volk's village'.

== Church ==
The parish church in the settlement is dedicated to Saint Leonard and belongs to the Koper Diocese. A second church, built outside the settlement, is dedicated to the Prophet Daniel.
