= Torre Valley dialect =

Slovene dialect spoken in Torre Valley and Breginjski kot

- Ter Valley dialect
- Po nasen
- Native to: Slovenia, Italy
- Region: Torre Valley, Breginjski kot
- Ethnicity: Slovenes
- Language family: Indo-European: Balto-Slavic; Slavic; South Slavic; Western South Slavic; Slovene; Littoral dialect group; Torre Valley dialect
- Dialects: Western microddialects; Eastern microddialects

Official status
- Recognised minority language in: Italy

Language codes
- ISO 639-3: –
- Torre Valley dialect

The Torre Valley dialect or Ter Valley dialect (Slovene: tersko narečje [ˈtɛ́ːɾskɔ naˈɾéːt͡ʃjɛ], terščina) is the westernmost and the most Romanized Slovene dialect. It is one of the most endangered Slovene dialects and is threatened with possible extinction. It is also one of the most archaic Slovene dialects, together with the Gail Valley and Natisone Valley dialects, which makes it interesting for typological research. It is spoken mainly in the Torre Valley in the Province of Udine in Italy, but also in western parts of the Municipality of Kobarid in the Slovene Littoral in Slovenia. The dialect borders the Soča dialect to the east, the Natisone Valley dialect to the southeast, Resian to the north, and Friulian to the southwest and west. The dialect belongs to the Littoral dialect group, and it evolved from Venetian–Karst dialect base.

== Geographical extension ==
The dialect is spoken mainly in northeastern Italy, in the province of Friuli-Venezia Giulia, roughly along the Torre River (Slovene: Ter) from Tarcento (Čenta) upstream. It also extends beyond this; it is bounded by Monti Musi (Mužci) to the north, by the Friulian plain to the west and south, and by Mount Joanaz (Ivanec) to the east, completely filling the area between the Natisone Valley and the Resian dialect. The dialect thus also extends into Slovenia, to the Breginj Combe in the Municipality of Kobarid in the Slovene Littoral, being spoken in villages such as Breginj, Logje, and Borjana. Larger settlements in the dialect area include Montefosca (Črni Vrh), Prossenicco (Prosnid), Canebola (Čenebola), Cergneu (Černjeja), Torlano (Torlan), Taipana (Tipana), Monteaperta (Viškorša), Vedronza (Njivica), Lusevera (Bardo), Torre (Ter), and Musi (Mužac).

Historically, it included the village of Pers (Breg or Brieh), the westernmost ethnically Slovene village.

== Accentual changes ==
The Torre Valley dialect retains pitch accent on long syllables, which are still longer than short syllables. It has undergone only one accent shift on most of its territory: the *sěnȏ > *sě̀no accent shift. However, the microdialects of Porzus (Porčinj), Prossenicco, and Subit (Subid) have also undergone the *bàbica > *babìca and *zíma > *zīmȁ accent shifts, resulting in a new short stressed syllable. The microdialect of Subit still retains length on formerly stressed vowels after the latter shift.

== Phonology ==
Alpine Slavic and later lengthened *ě̄ turned into i(ː)e, simplifying into iːə in the south. Similarly, long *ō also turned into u(ː)o, simplifying into uːə in the south, whereas later lengthened *ò turned into ọː in the west, progressing all the way to åː in the south. Similarly, *ē also varies between ẹː and äː, but the distribution is more sporadic. Nasal *ę̄ and *ǭ evolved the same, but may not have merged with their non-nasal counterparts in all microdialects. Syllabic *ł̥̄ turned into oːu~ọːu in the west and into uː in the east. Syllabic *r̥ turned into aːr in the west and ər in the east. Vowel reduction is not common. Akanye is present in some microdialects for *ǫ̀ and *ę̀. Ukanye is more common, and *ì simplified into ì̥ in the west and to ə in the east. In some microdialects, particularly in the west, secondary nasalization of vowels occurs in sequences consisting of vowel + final m/n.

Eastern dialects simplified *g into ɣ, whereas in the west it completely disappeared. In the far west (e.g., Torre), alveolar and post-alveolar sibilants merged. The consonant *t’ mostly turned into ć. Palatal *ń is still palatal, and *ĺ turned into j.

== Morphology ==
The morphology of the Torre Valley dialect differs greatly from that of standard Slovene, mainly because of influence of Romance languages.

The neuter gender exists in the singular, but it has been feminized in plural. Dual forms are limited to the nominative and accusative cases, and verbs do not have separate dual forms, although the ending -ta is used for the second-person plural, and -te is reserved for vikanje. The dialect has two future forms: future I, formed with the verb ti̥ẹ́ti̥ 'want' in the present tense followed by an infinitive, and future II, formed in the same way as the future in standard Slovene. The dialect also has a subjunctive, which is formed with ke + the imperative form. The pluperfect still exists, as well as the long infinitive. The dialect also has -l, -n, and -ć (equivalent to standard Slovene -č) participles.

== Writing and vocabulary ==
The dialect already appeared in written form in the Cividale manuscript in 1479, but it was not later used in written form. Today, because of the lack of a language policy and Italianization, the dialect has a very small number of speakers and is threatened with extinction. In 2009, a dictionary of the Torre Valley dialect was published, based on material mainly collected at the end of the 19th century, but also in the 20th century.

== Bibliography ==
- Ježovnik, Janoš (2019). Notranja glasovna in naglasna členjenost terskega narečja slovenščine (in Slovenian). Ljubljana: University of Ljubljana.
- Šekli, Matej (2018). Legan Ravnikar, Andreja (ed.). Tipologija lingvogenez slovanskih jezikov. Collection Linguistica et philologica (in Slovenian). Translated by Plotnikova, Anastasija. Ljubljana: Znanstvenoraziskovalni center SAZU. ISBN 978-961-05-0137-4.
