= Littoral dialect group =

Group of dialects of Slovene

Map of regional groups of Slovene dialects based on Horizontal division Littoral (1. Šavrin, 2. Čičarija)

The Littoral dialect group (primorska narečna skupina) is a group of very heterogeneous dialects of Slovene. The Littoral dialects are spoken in most of the Slovenian Littoral (except for the mountainous areas around Tolmin and Cerkno, where Rovte dialects are spoken) and in the western part of Inner Carniola. They are also spoken by Slovenes in the Italian provinces of Trieste and Gorizia, and in the mountainous areas of eastern Friuli (Venetian Slovenia and Resia).

== Phonological and morphological characteristics ==
Among other features, this group is characterized by diphthongization of yat > ie and o > uo, and late denasalization of *ę and *ǫ. The western dialects in this group have preserved pitch accent whereas the others have a non-tonal stress accent.

== Individual dialects and subdialects ==
- Resia(n) dialect (rezijansko narečje, rezijanščina); spoken in the Resia Valley (Italy)
- Soča dialect (obsoško narečje); spoken in the Upper Soča Valley
- Torre Valley dialect (tersko narečje, terščina); spoken in the upper Torre Valley (Italy) and in the Breginj area (Slovenia)
- Natisone Valley dialect (nadiško narečje, nadiščina); spoken in the Natisone Valley in Venetian Slovenia (Italy) and in western parts of the Gorizia region (Slovenia)
- Brda dialect (briško narečje, briščina); spoken in the Brda (Italian: Collio Goriziano) area in Slovenia and in Italy, as well as in some suburbs of Gorizia (Italy)
- Karst dialect (kraško narečje, kraščina); spoken in the north-western parts of the Karst Plateau, in the lower Vipava Valley and in the lower Soča Valley, as well as in some suburbs of Gorizia and Trieste (Italy)
  - Banjšice subdialect (banjški govor, banjiški govor); spoken on the Banjšice Plateau
- Istrian dialect (istrsko narečje, istrščina); spoken in Slovenian Istria and parts of the Italian Province of Trieste
  - Rižana subdialect (rižanski govor); spoken in northern Slovenian Istria and parts of the Province of Trieste (Italy)
  - Šavrin Hills subdialect (šavrinski govor, šavrinščina); spoken in southern Slovenian Istria
- Inner Carniolan dialect (notranjsko narečje, notranjščina); spoken in western Inner Carniola, the upper Vipava Valley, and southern Karst Plateau, as well as in most of the Slovenian-inhabited suburbs of Trieste (Italy)
- Čičarija dialect (čiško narečje, čički dialekt); spoken in a few villages in Slovenian Istria on the border with Croatia
