= Podbela =

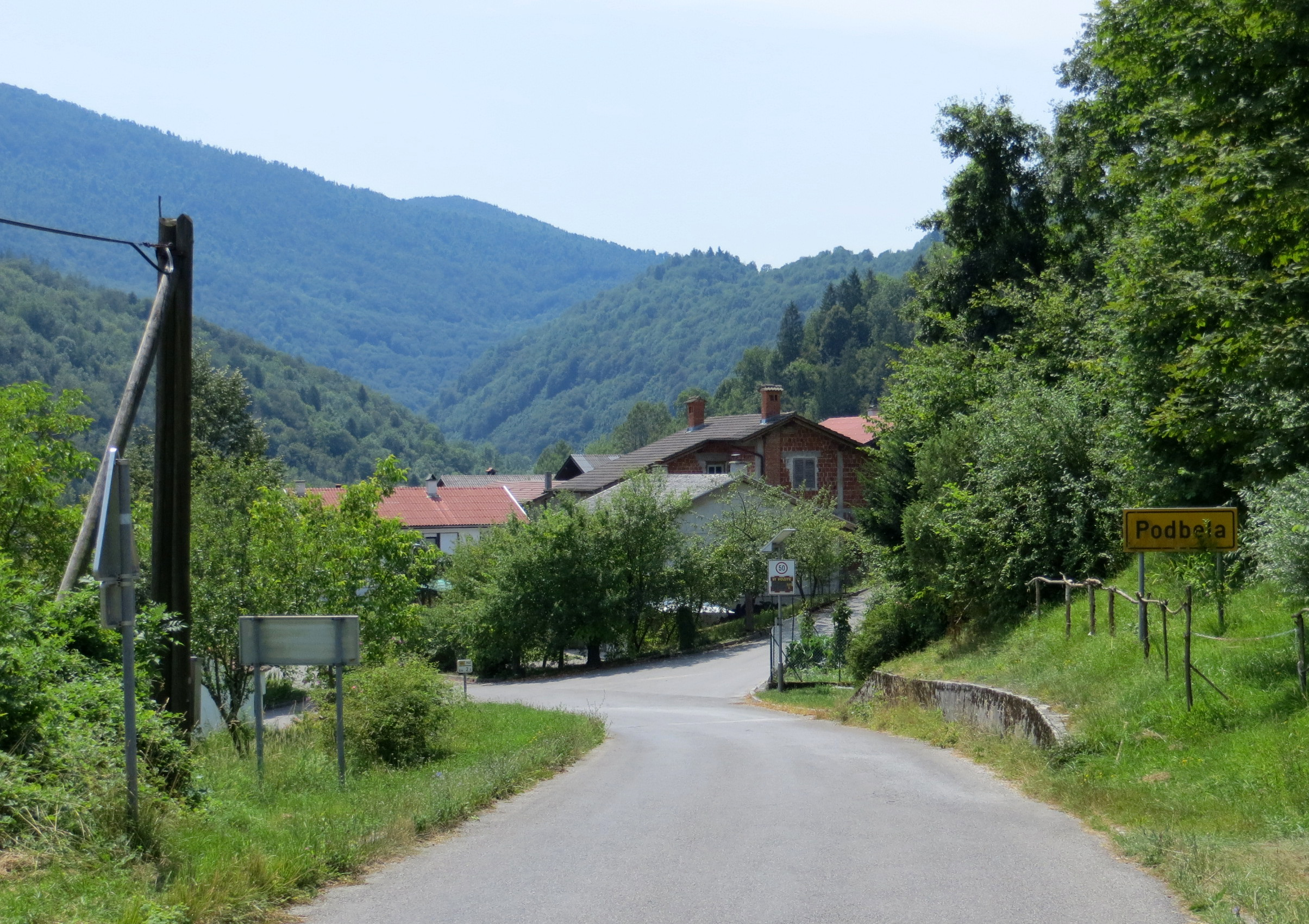

- Location in Slovenia
- Coordinates: 46°14′49.59″N 13°27′22.36″E
- Country: Slovenia
- Traditional region: Slovenian Littoral
- Statistical region: Gorizia
- Municipality: Kobarid

Area
  - Total: 5.87 km^{2} (2.27 sq mi)
- Elevation: 312.6 m (1,026 ft)

Population (2002)
  - Total: 85

Podbela (pronounced [pɔdˈbeːla]; Italian: Sant'Elena al Natisone, before 1927 Podibela) is a small village on the left bank of the Nadiža River in the Municipality of Kobarid in the Littoral region of Slovenia. It is located in the Breginj Combe.

== Church ==
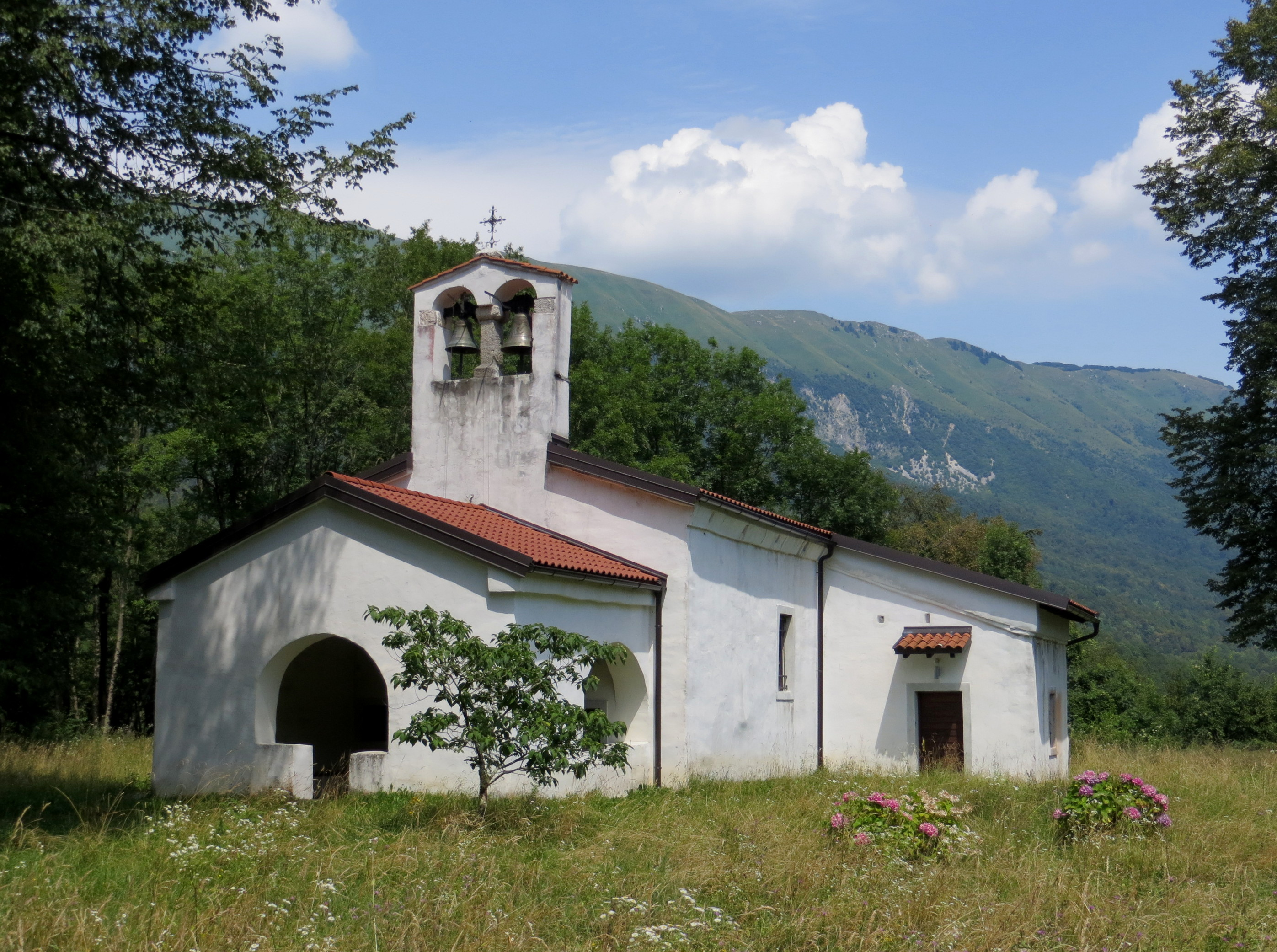
Saint Helen's Church

The church southwest of the settlement is dedicated to Saint Helen. It dates from the 16th century. It was greatly damaged in the 1976 Friuli earthquake and then restored.
