= Logje =

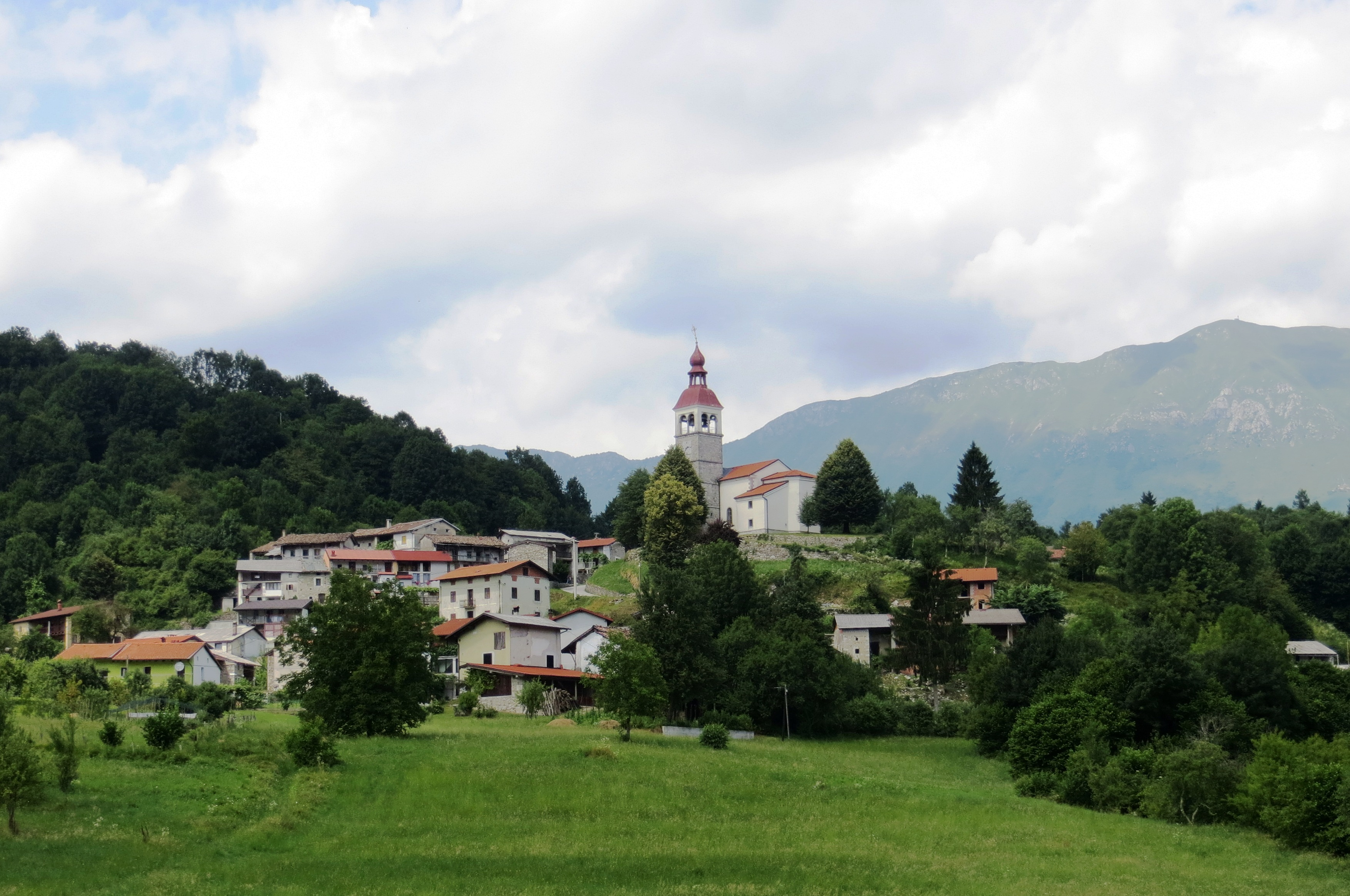

- Location in Slovenia
- Coordinates: 46°13′59.53″N 13°25′58.35″E
- Country: Slovenia
- Traditional region: Slovenian Littoral
- Statistical region: Gorizia
- Municipality: Kobarid

Area
  - Total: 8.42 km^{2} (3.25 sq mi)
- Elevation: 498.7 m (1,636 ft)

Population (2002)
  - Total: 64

Logje (pronounced [lɔɡˈjeː]) is a small settlement in the Municipality of Kobarid in the Littoral region of Slovenia. It includes the hamlets of Brežani, Vrhovci, Rosi, and Končanjani.

== Geography ==
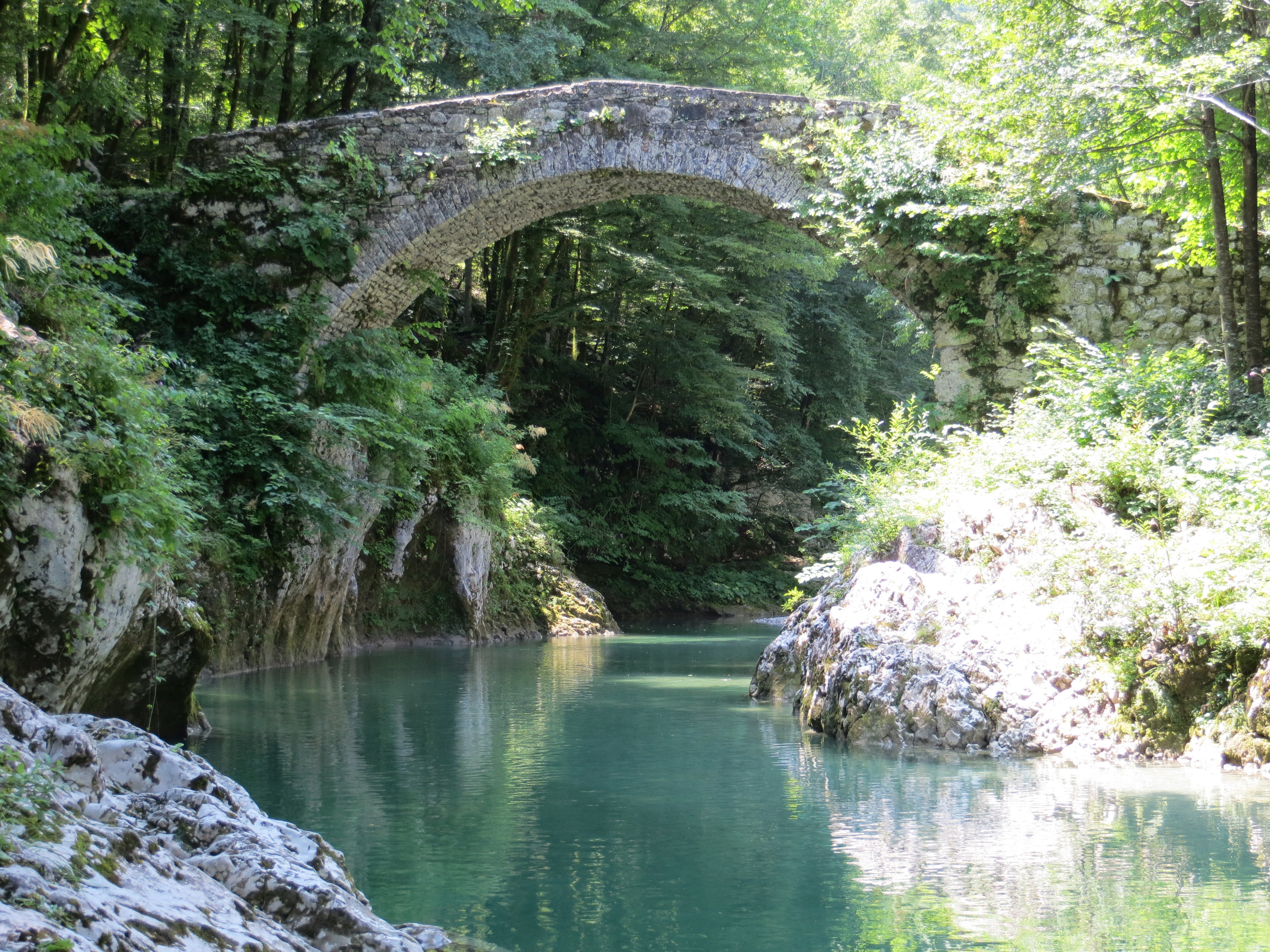
Napoleon Bridge on the Nadiža River

Logje is a clustered village in the Breginj Combe on a semicircular slope above a broad terrace over the Nadiža River below Sleme Hill (598 m). It is connected by a road to Breginj that leads through undulating plateaus and then descends steeply to the terrace, where it continues to Robidišče. The fields are divided into small parcels and there are also hay fields and pastures. Below the village, Jamjak and Parivnjak creeks empty into the Nadiža. There are also several springs below the village. South of the village, a trail crosses a stone bridge known as the Napoleon Bridge (Slovene: Napoleonov most) and then continues south to the Pradolino dry valley (Italian: Valle di Pradolino, Slovene: Pradol or Predol), and then on to Stupizza, where it meets the Nadiža once again.

== History ==
After the Second World War, 70 people from the village emigrated to Argentina, Australia, Germany, and France, leaving many of the houses in the village empty.

== Church ==
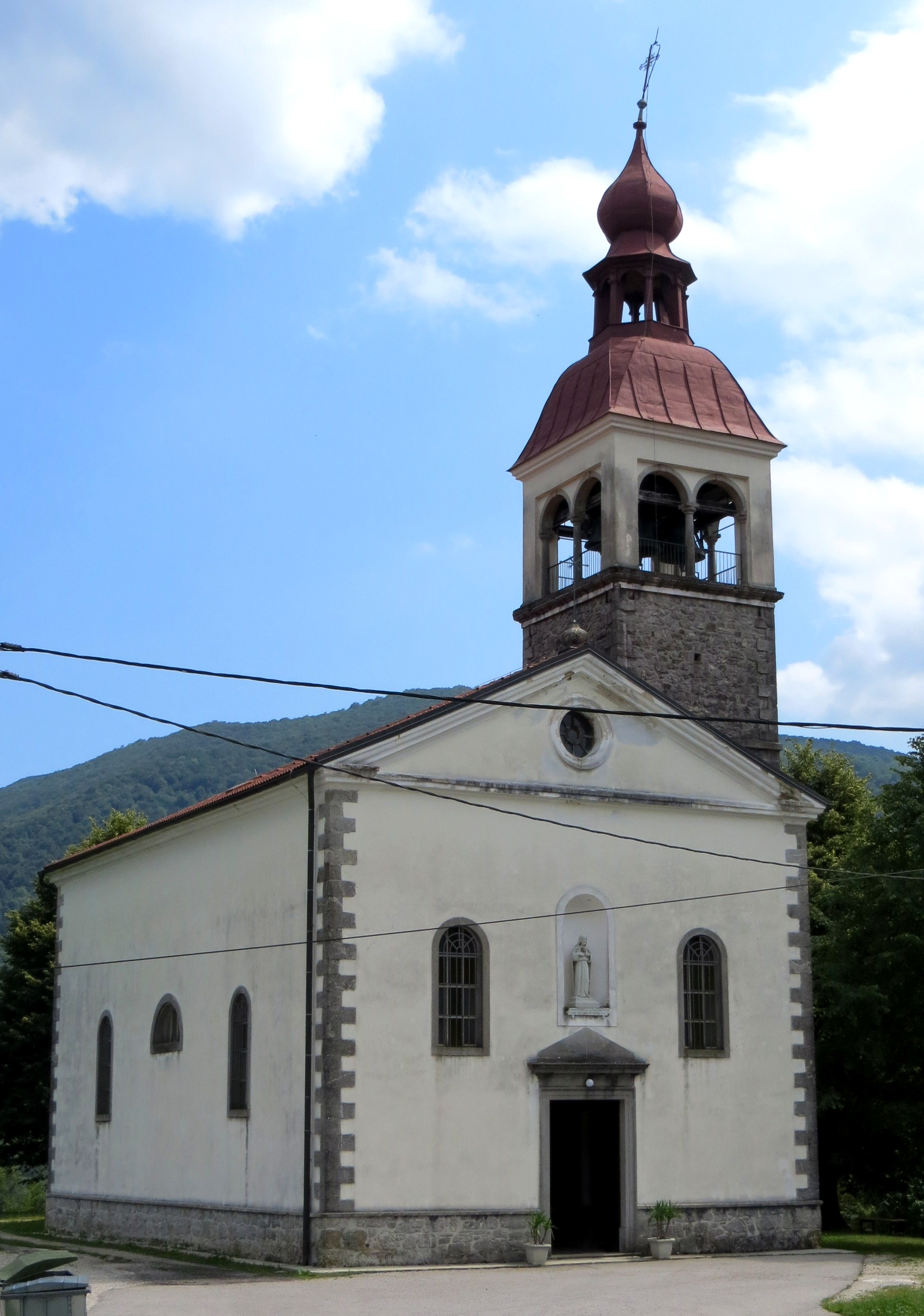
View from north

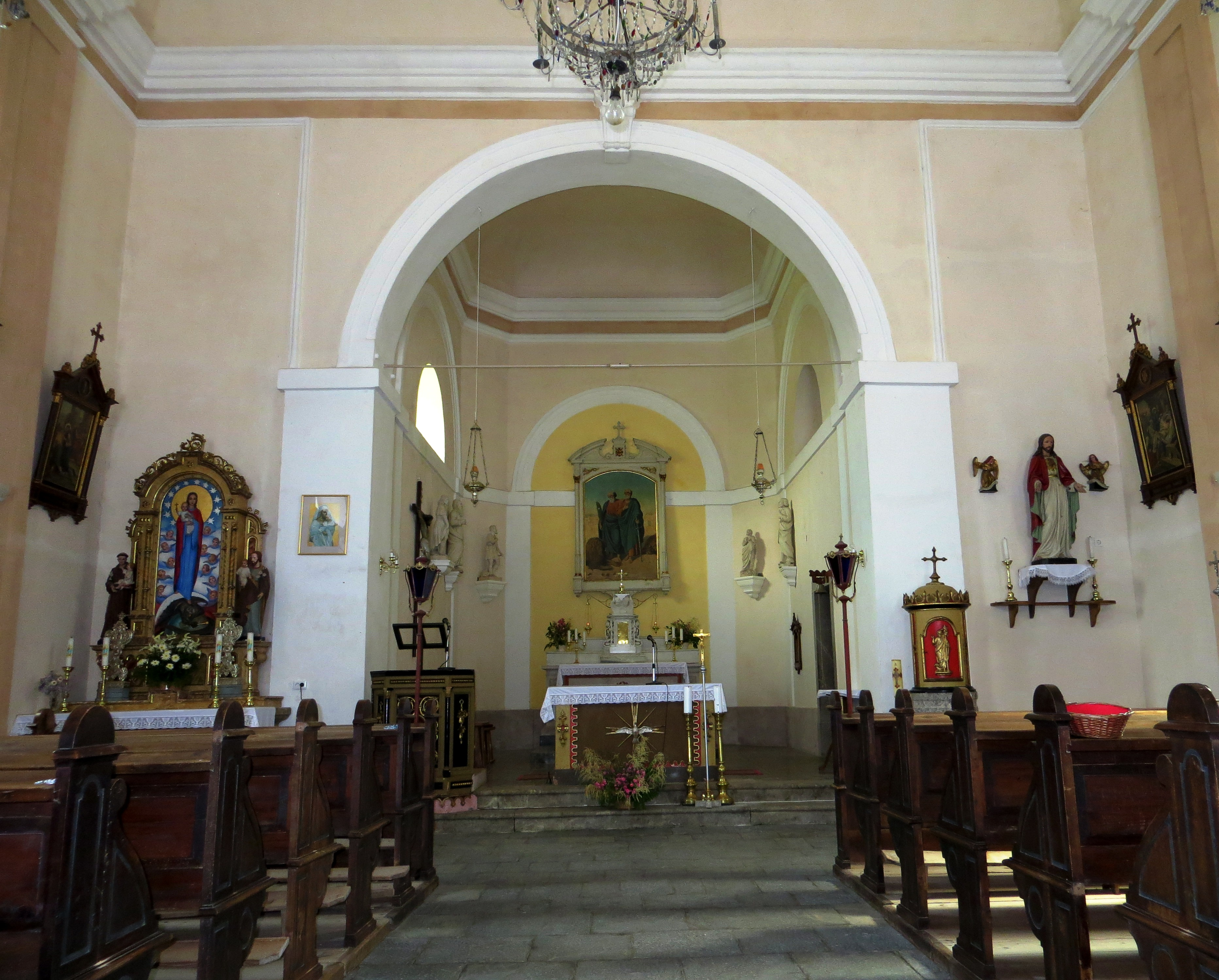
Church interior

Saints Primus and Felicianus Church

The church in the settlement is dedicated to Saints Primus and Felicianus.
