= Idrija (river) =

Border river between Italy and Slovenia

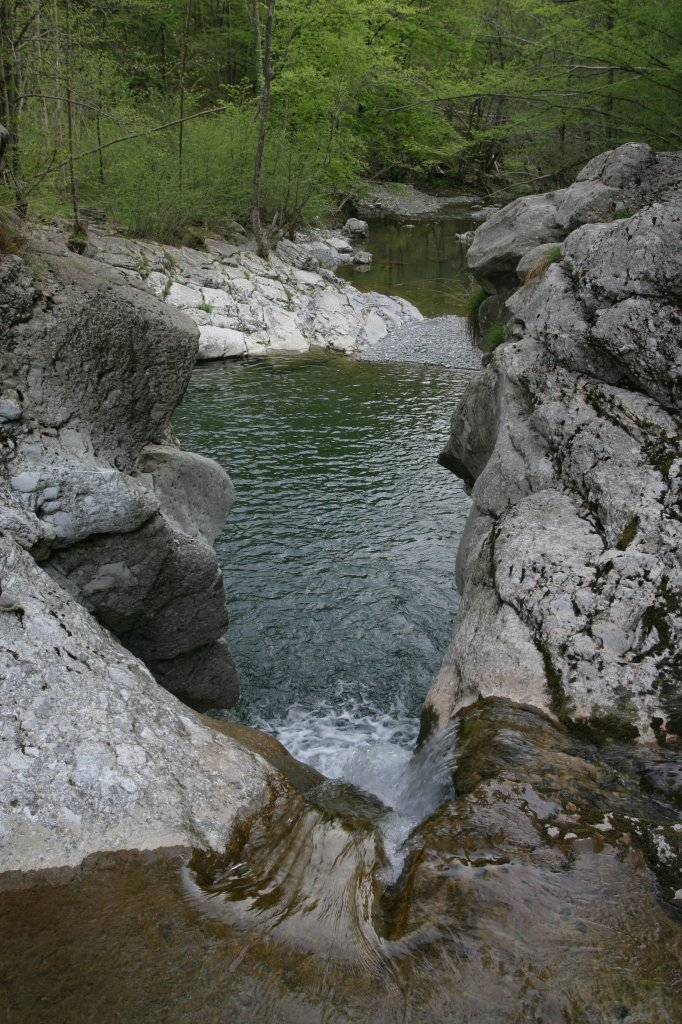
- The upper reaches of the Idrija

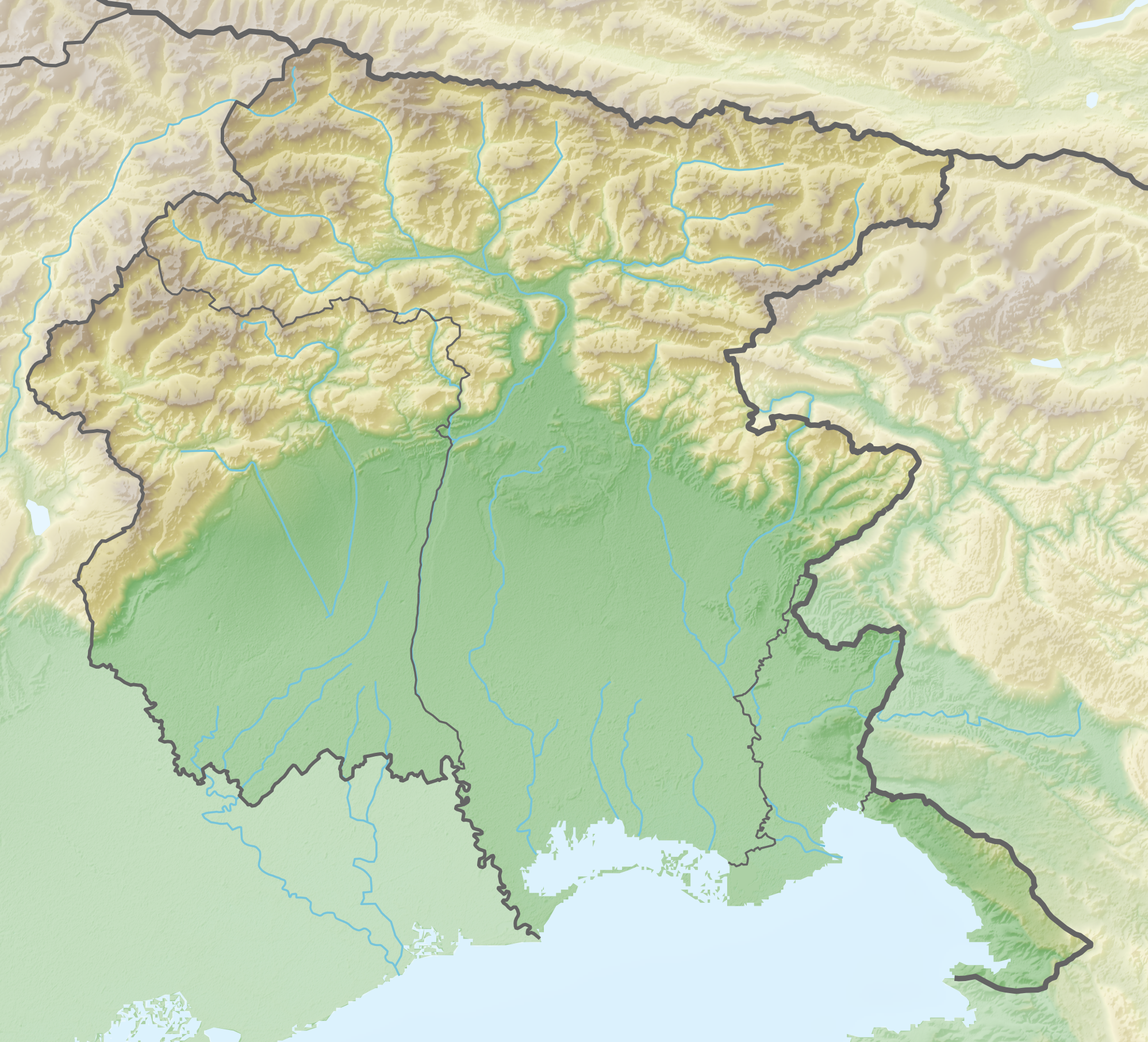
- Location within Friuli-Venezia Giulia

Location
- Country: Slovenia, Italy

Physical characteristics
- Source: below Kolovrat near Volče
  - location: 46.16424889°N 13.65066217°E
  - elevation: 876 m a.s.l.
- Mouth: Torre
  - location: Romans d'Isonzo
- Length: 50 km (31 mi)

Idrija (Italian: Judrio or Iudrio, Friulian: Judri, Venetian Slovene dialect Juruda) is a border river between Slovenia and Italy. It separates the Gorizia Hills from the Slavia Friulana. It emerges under the Kolovrat ridge and flows southwest towards Friuli where it joins the Torre. The river was historically important as separating the Republic of Venice from the Habsburg Lands, Italy from Austria-Hungary and, since 1947, Italy from Yugoslavia.
