= Breginj Combe =

Coordinates: 46°15′57″N 13°25′4″E

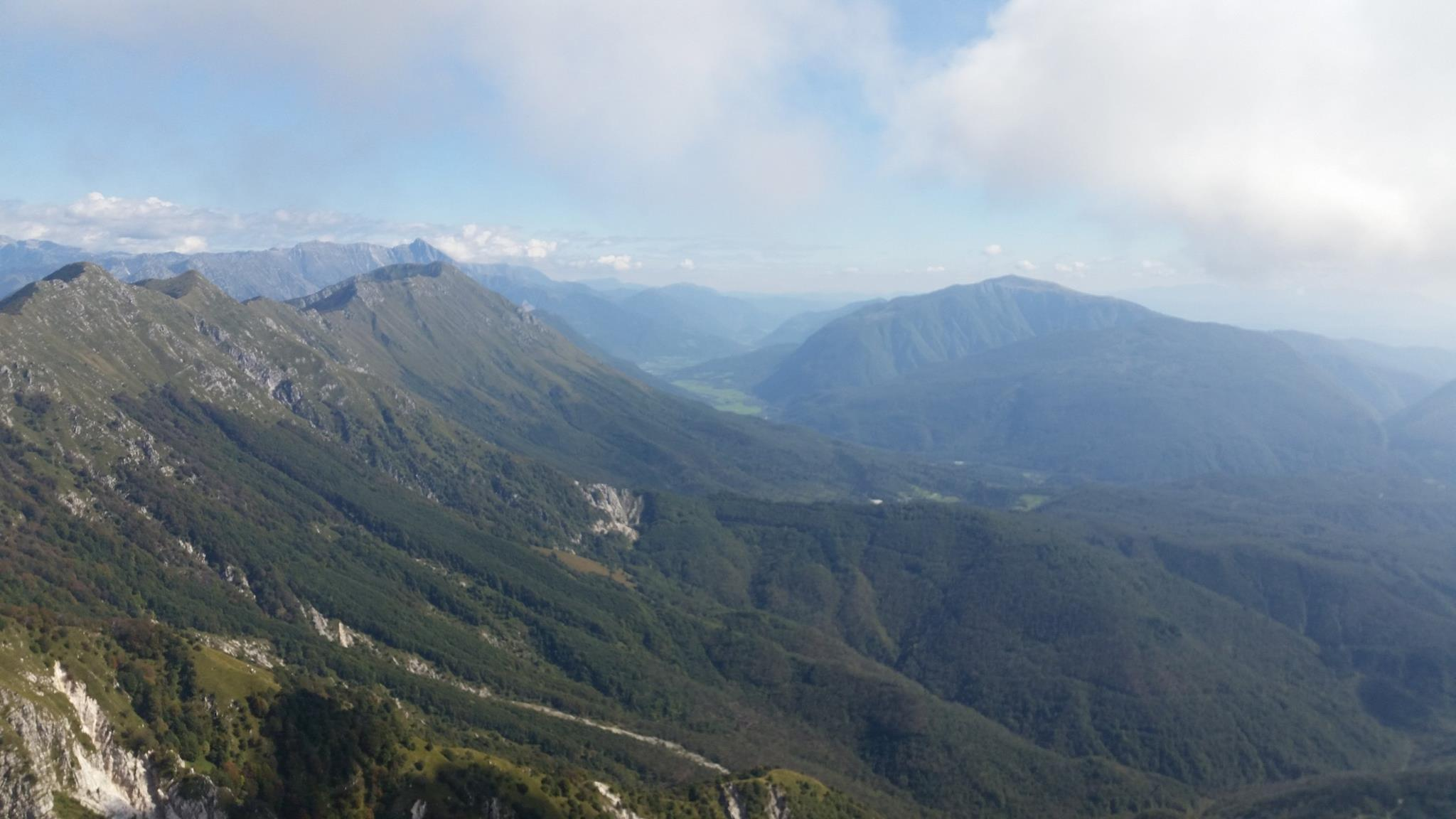
View of the Breginj Combe from Breški Jalovec / Punta di Montemaggiore

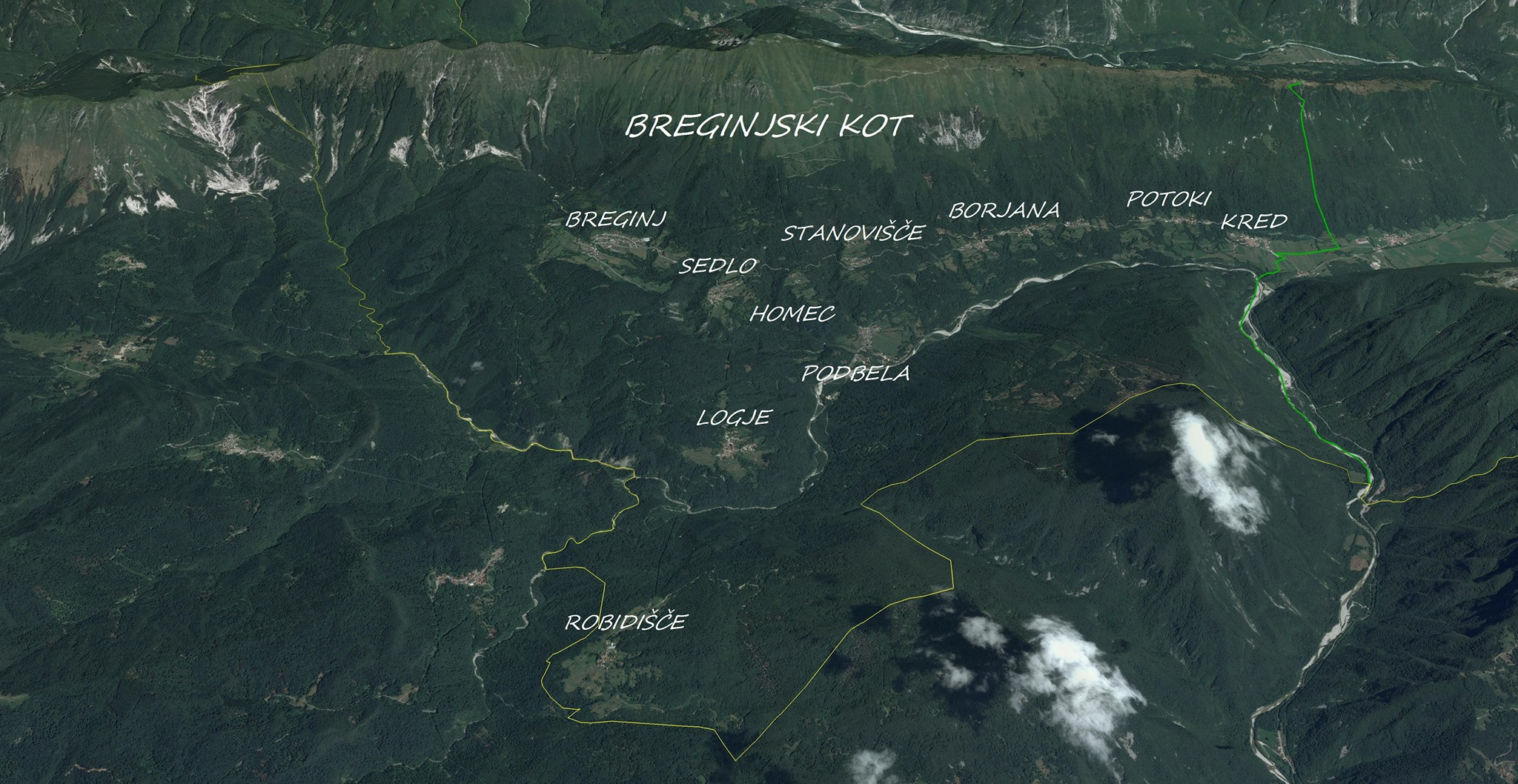
Villages in the Breginj Combe

The Breginj Combe (Slovene: Breginjski kot) is a valley in western Slovenia. It lies between the elongated ridge of Mount Stol (1,673 meters or 5,489 feet) to the north and Mount Mia (Slovene: Mija, 1,237 meters or 4,058 feet) to the south. To the east it expands into the broad Staro Selo Lowland (Staroselsko podolje), and to the west it meets the border with Italy. The Slovenian–Italian border runs along the Nadiža/Natisone River and its tributary, Black Creek (Slovene: Črni potok, Italian: Rio Nero).

The Breginj Combe forms part of the cultural region of Slavia Friulana (Beneška Slovenija). It includes ten villages – Borjana, Kred, Potoki, Podbela, Breginj, Stanovišče, Homec, Robidišče, Sedlo, and Logje. The heritage of the region include ethnographic monuments, especially architectural heritage, which was extensively damaged by the 1976 Friuli earthquake. Some of this heritage is preserved in the Breginj Museum in Breginj.

Popular tourism destinations in the Breginj Combe include the Napoleon Bridge in Logje and the village of Robidišče, which is the westernmost settlement in Slovenia. The Nadiža River is warm during the summers and popular for swimming.
