= Potoki, Kobarid =

Potoki
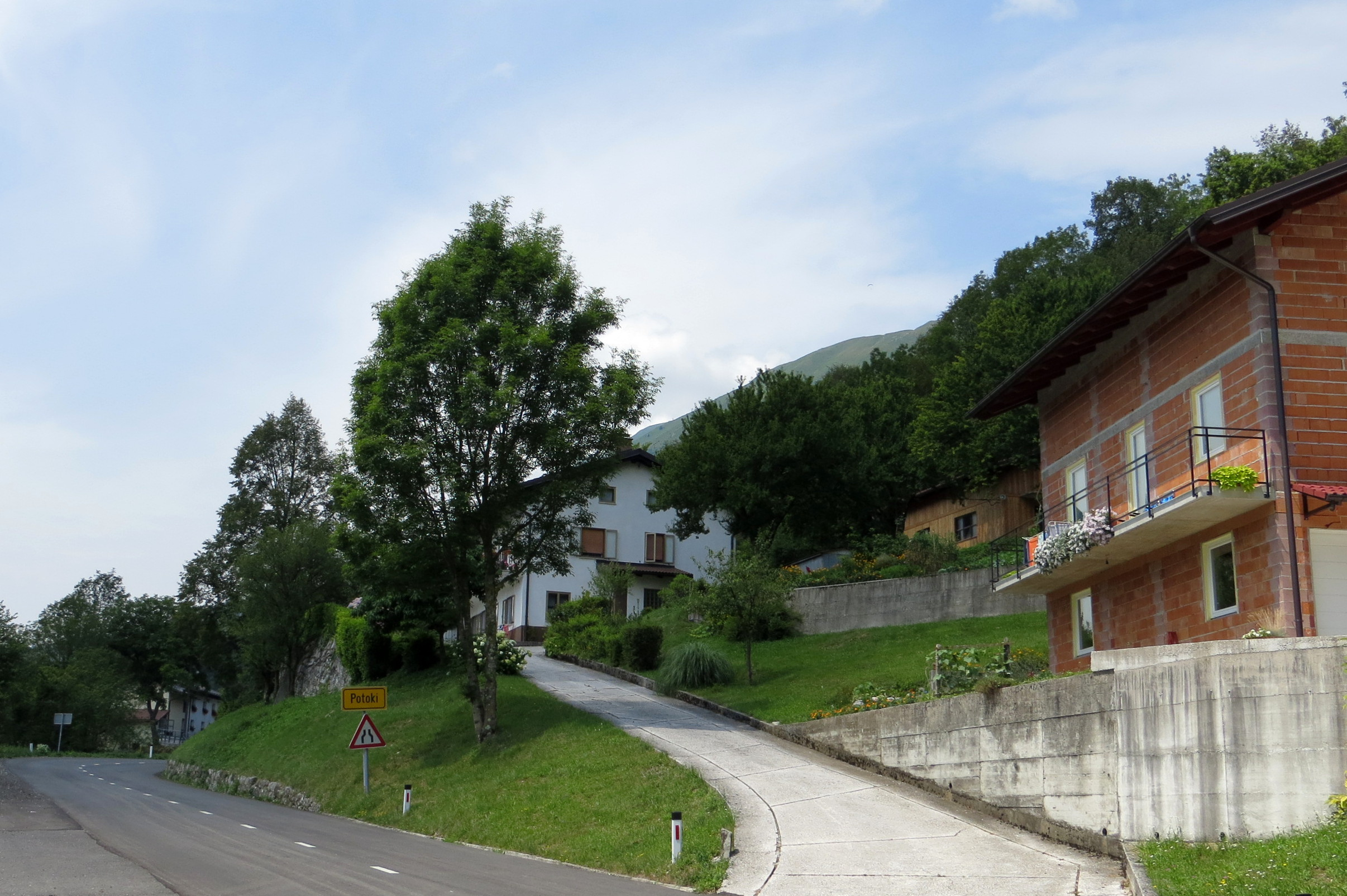

- Location in Slovenia
- Coordinates: 46°15′15.83″N 13°30′13.46″E
- Country: Slovenia
- Traditional region: Slovenian Littoral
- Statistical region: Gorizia
- Municipality: Kobarid

Area
  - Total: 2.69 km^{2} (1.04 sq mi)
- Elevation: 343.3 m (1,126 ft)

Population (2002)
  - Total: 69

Potoki (pronounced [pɔˈtoːki]) is a small village in the Upper Nadiža Valley in the Municipality of Kobarid in the Littoral region of Slovenia. It is located in the Breginj Combe.
