= Selišče, Tolmin =

Selišče
- Location in Slovenia
- Coordinates: 46°12′41.43″N 13°39′31.01″E
- Country: Slovenia
- Traditional region: Slovenian Littoral
- Statistical region: Gorizia
- Municipality: Tolmin

Area
  - Total: 1.02 km^{2} (0.39 sq mi)
- Elevation: 211 m (692 ft)

Population (2002)
  - Total: 23

Selišče (pronounced [sɛˈliːʃtʃɛ]) is a small village between Kamno and Volarje in the Municipality of Tolmin in the Littoral region of Slovenia.
