= Stanovišče =

- Location in Slovenia
- Coordinates: 46°15′23.37″N 13°27′29.35″E
- Country: Slovenia
- Traditional region: Slovenian Littoral
- Statistical region: Gorizia
- Municipality: Kobarid

Area
  - Total: 3.77 km^{2} (1.46 sq mi)
- Elevation: 560.2 m (1,838 ft)

Population (2002)
  - Total: 40

Stanovišče (pronounced [stanɔˈʋiːʃtʃɛ]; Italian: Stanovischis) is a small settlement in the Municipality of Kobarid in the Littoral region of Slovenia. It is located in the Breginj Combe.
