= Jožef Školč =

Slovenian politician

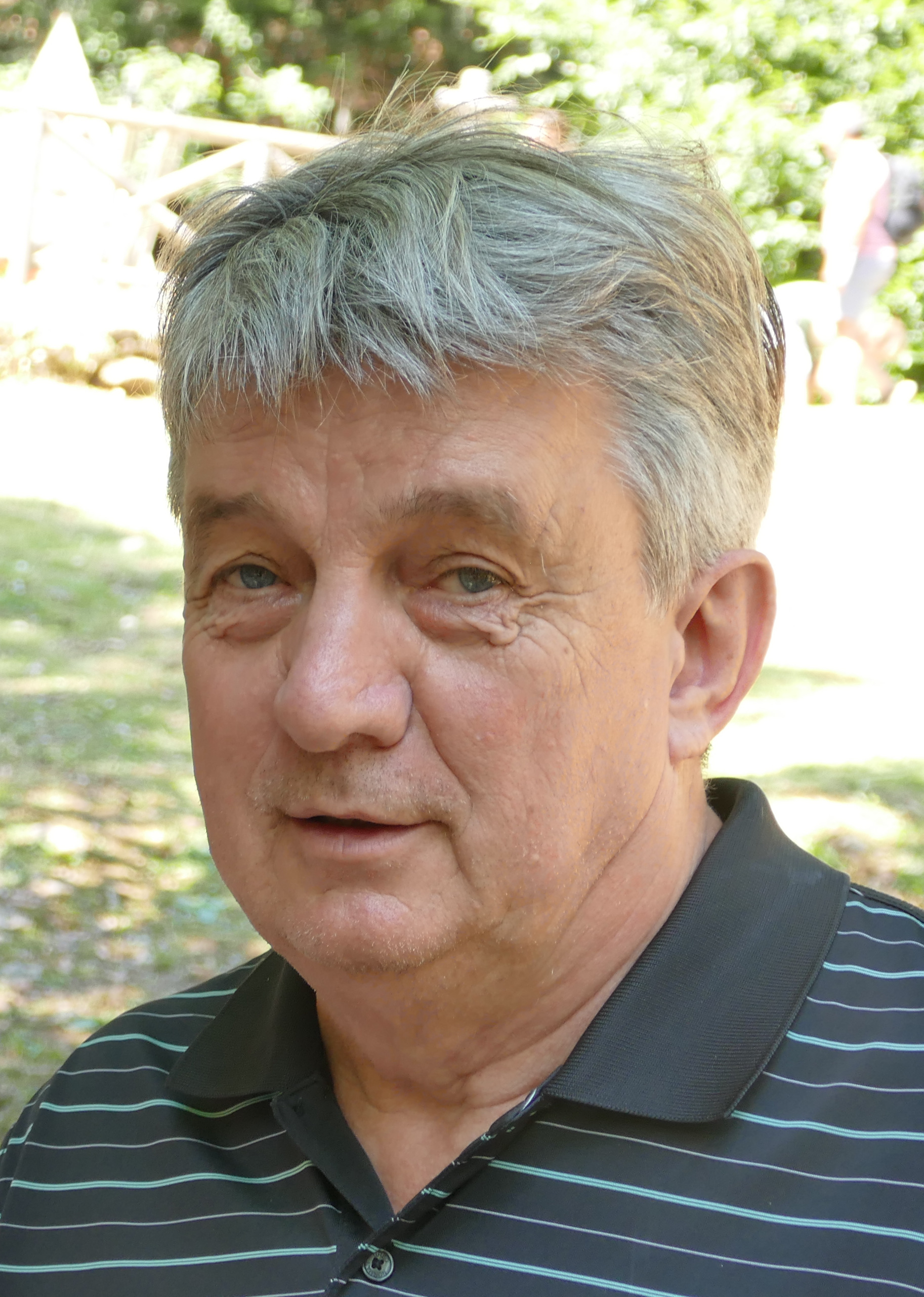

3rd Speaker of the National Assembly of Slovenia
- In office 16 September 1994 – 3 December 1996
- Preceded by: Herman Rigelnik
- Succeeded by: Janez Podobnik

Personal details
- Born: 19 August 1960 Breginj
- Party: Liberal Democracy of Slovenia
- Education: University of Ljubljana
- Profession: political scientist, politician

Jožef Školč (born 19 August 1960) is a Slovenian left liberal politician.

He was born in the village of Breginj in western Slovenia, in what was then the Federal People's Republic of Yugoslavia. He graduated from political science at the University of Ljubljana. In 1988 he was elected president of the Alliance of Socialist Youth of Slovenia, the youth organization of the Communist Party of Slovenia. By that time, the organization was already fairly independent from the party and played an important role in the process of democratization of Slovenia. In 1990, the Alliance of Socialist Youth was renamed to Liberal Democratic Party and Školč became its first president. In the first free elections in Slovenia in April 1990, the party gained around 14% of the popular vote and remained in opposition against the government led by the DEMOS coalition.

In 1992, Školč resigned as president of the Liberal Democratic Party to give way to Janez Drnovšek. The same year, he was elected MP in the Slovenian National Assembly and between 1994 and 1996, he served as its speaker. Between 1997 and 2000, he served as Minister of Culture of Slovenia.

Between 2007 and 2008, he was head of the parliament group of the Liberal Democracy of Slovenia. Since 2008, he has been serving as a State Secretary in the Cabinet of the Prime Minister Borut Pahor.

Political offices
Preceded by Herman Rigelnik	Speaker of the National Assembly of Slovenia; 1994–1996	Succeeded by Janez Podobnik
Preceded by Janez Dular	Minister of Culture; 27 February 1997 – 7 June 2000	Succeeded by Rudi Šeligo
Party political offices
New title	President of the Liberal Democratic Party; 1990–1992	Succeeded by Janez Drnovšek
