= Sedlo, Kobarid =

Sedlo
- Location in Slovenia
- Coordinates: 46°15′11.4″N 13°26′19.18″E
- Country: Slovenia
- Traditional region: Slovenian Littoral
- Statistical region: Gorizia
- Municipality: Kobarid

Area
  - Total: 6.6 km^{2} (2.5 sq mi)
- Elevation: 494 m (1,621 ft)

Population (2002)
  - Total: 84

Sedlo (pronounced [ˈsɛːdlɔ] or [sɛˈdlɔ]; Italian: Sedula) is a village in the Municipality of Kobarid in the Littoral region of Slovenia. It is located in the Breginj Combe.

The parish church in the settlement is dedicated to the Holy Cross.
