= Homec, Kobarid =

Homec
- Location in Slovenia
- Coordinates: 46°15′13.22″N 13°26′57.89″E
- Country: Slovenia
- Traditional region: Slovenian Littoral
- Statistical region: Gorizia
- Municipality: Kobarid

Area
  - Total: 1.6 km^{2} (0.62 sq mi)
- Elevation: 504 m (1,654 ft)

Population (2011)
  - Total: 8

Homec (pronounced [ˈxoːməts]) is a small settlement in the Municipality of Kobarid in the Littoral region of Slovenia. It is located in the Breginj Combe.
