= Robidišče =

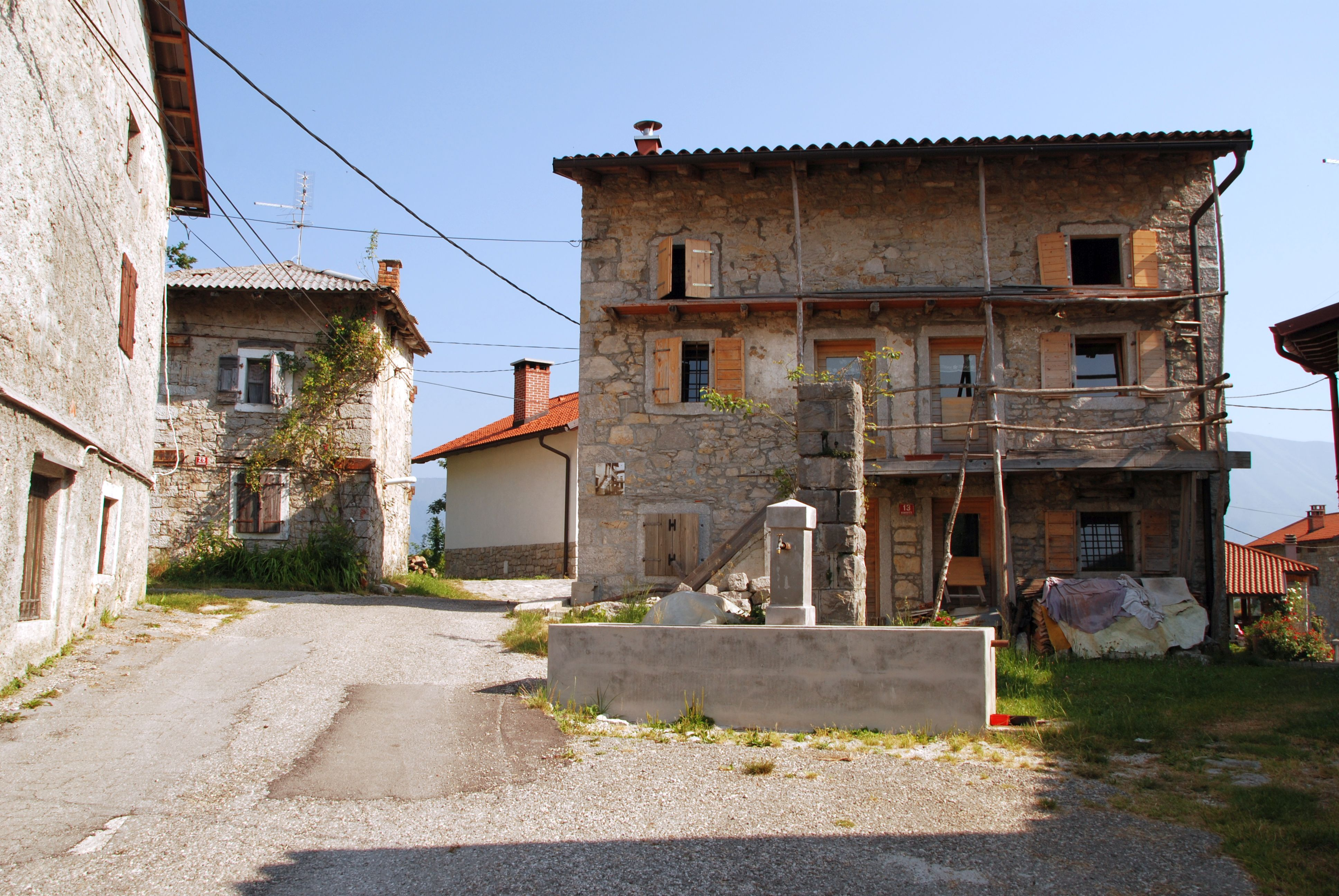
- The centre of the village of Robidišče

- Location within Slovenia
- Coordinates: 46°12′55.46″N 13°24′52.51″E
- Country: Slovenia
- Traditional region: Slovenian Littoral
- Statistical region: Gorizia
- Municipality: Kobarid

Area
  - Total: 1.41 km^{2} (0.54 sq mi)
- Elevation: 671 m (2,201 ft)

Population (2002)
  - Total: 7
  - Density: 5.0/km^{2} (13/sq mi)

Robidišče (pronounced [ɾɔbiˈdiːʃtʃɛ]; Italian: Robedischis) is Slovenia's westernmost settlement. It is located in the Municipality of Kobarid in the Littoral region on the border with Italy. It is located in the Breginj Combe.

== Name ==
Robidišče was mentioned in written sources in 1763–87 as Robedisca. The name is derived from the Slovene common noun robidišče 'place where blackberries grow', from the common noun robida 'blackberry', which is also the source of related place names (e.g., Robidnica). In the local dialect, the settlement is known as Arbiešča.
