= Volarje =

- Location in Slovenia
- Coordinates: 46°12′34.95″N 13°40′26.22″E
- Country: Slovenia
- Traditional region: Slovenian Littoral
- Statistical region: Gorizia
- Municipality: Tolmin

Area
  - Total: 4.09 km^{2} (1.58 sq mi)
- Elevation: 180.6 m (593 ft)

Population (2002)
  - Total: 243

Volarje (pronounced [ˈʋoːlaɾjɛ]; Italian: Vollaria) is a village on the left bank of the Soča River in the Municipality of Tolmin in the Littoral region of Slovenia.

The local church, built outside the settlement on the road towards Selišče, is dedicated to Saint Bricius and belongs to the Parish of Tolmin.
