= Borjana =

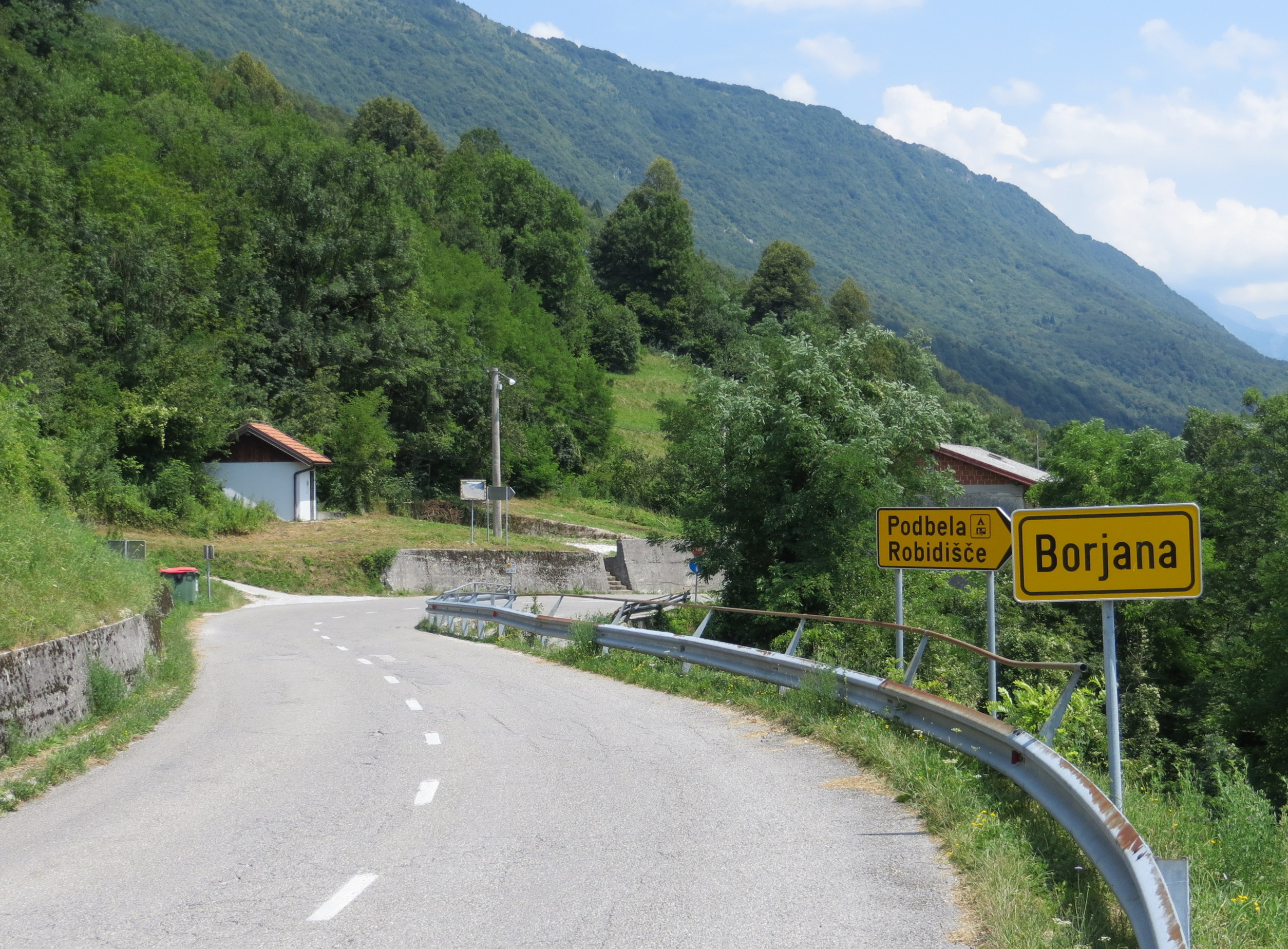

- Location in Slovenia
- Coordinates: 46°15′21.47″N 13°28′45.52″E
- Country: Slovenia
- Traditional region: Slovenian Littoral
- Statistical region: Gorizia
- Municipality: Kobarid

Area
  - Total: 11.42 km^{2} (4.41 sq mi)
- Elevation: 431.5 m (1,416 ft)

Population (2002)
  - Total: 148

Borjana (pronounced [bɔˈɾjaːna]) is a village in the Municipality of Kobarid in the Littoral region of Slovenia. It is located in the Breginj Combe.

== Church ==
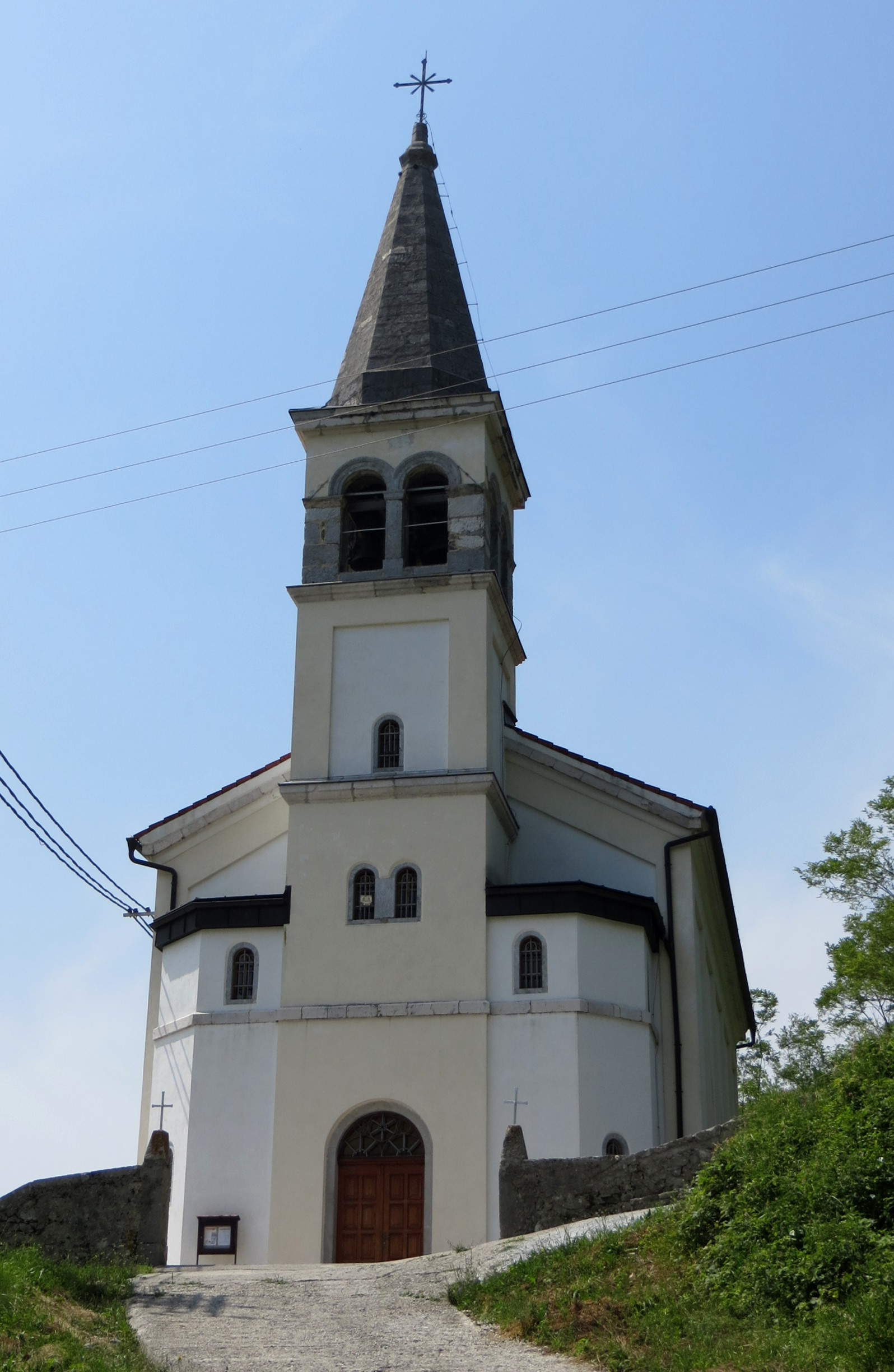
Saint Catherine's Church

The parish church in the settlement is dedicated to Saint Catherine of Alexandria.
