= Kolovrat (mountain ridge) =

Mountain ridge of the Julian Prealps on the border between Slovenia and Italy

Coordinates: 46.1441°N 13.6241°E

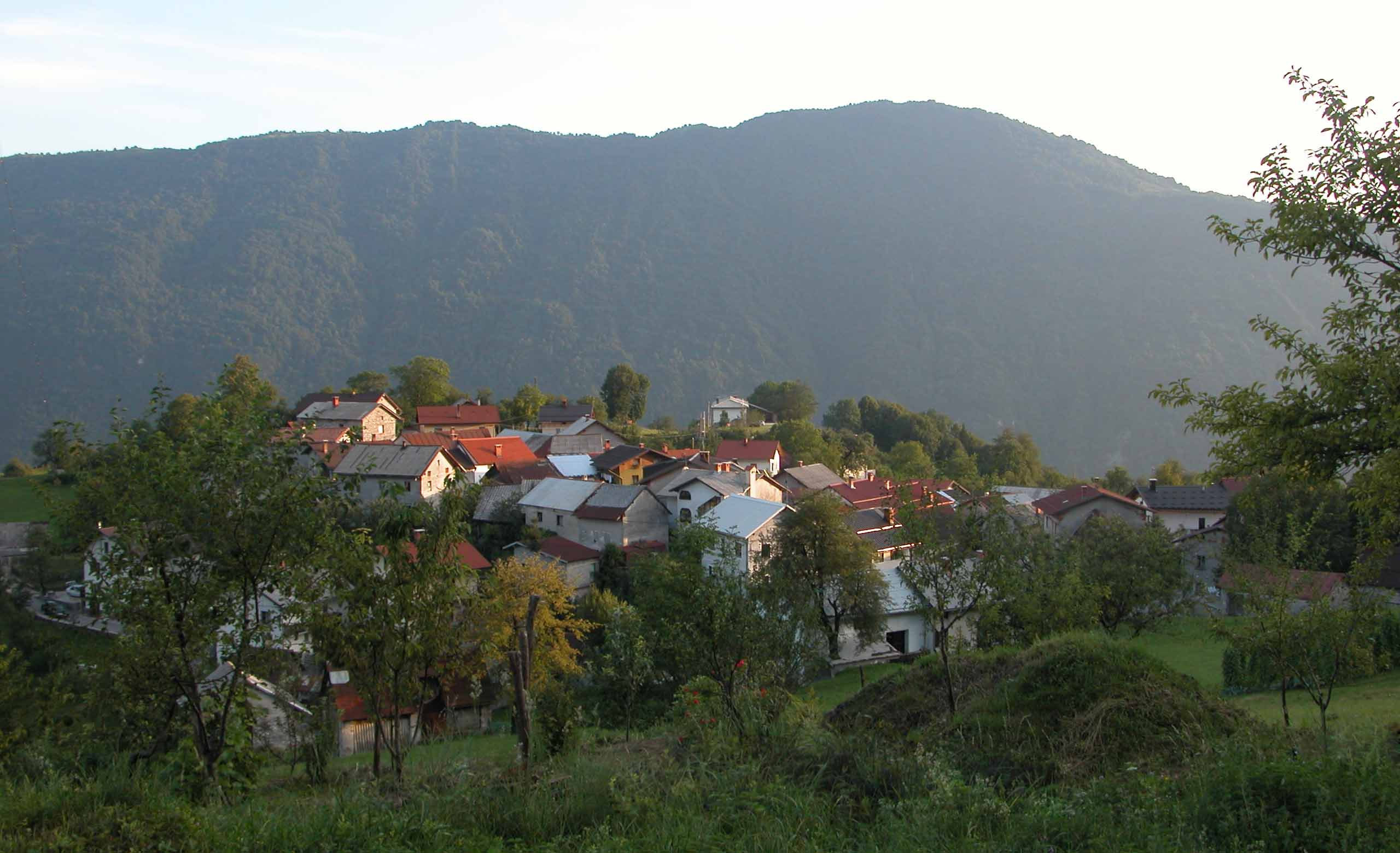
View of Kolovrat from the east. In the front, the village of Vrsno in western Slovenia.

Kolovrat (Friulian: Colorât, Italian: Colovrat) is a mountain ridge of the Julian Prealps on the border between Slovenia and Italy, west of Tolmin and southeast of Kobarid. It is a geographical border between the Soča Valley in Slovenia and the Venetian Slovenia region of Italy. It extends about 7 km at an elevation between 800 and 1150 m.

There are two roads on the ridge, one from the Italian side, accessible from Drenchia, and one from the Slovenian side, accessible from the villages of Livek and Volče.

Between the 15th and late 18th centuries, the Kolovrat Ridge used to be the border between the Habsburg monarchy and the Venetian Republic. Between 1866 and 1918, the border between the Austro-Hungarian Empire and Italy also ran along the same line. Between 1947 and 1991, it was the border between Italy and Yugoslavia.

In October and November 1917, it was an important site in the Battle of Caporetto.

== See also ==
- Matajur
