= 1976 Friuli earthquake =

Extreme earthquake in Italy

- Location within Italy
- UTC time: 1976-05-06 20:00:12
- ISC event: 713583
- USGS-ANSS: ComCat
- Local date: 6 May 1976
- Local time: 21:00:13
- Magnitude: 6.5 M_{w}
- Depth: 10 km (6.2 mi)
- Epicenter: 46.37°N 13.32°E
- Type: Dip-slip
- Areas affected: Italy; Yugoslavia (Slovenia); Austria
- Max. intensity: EMS-98 X (Very destructive)
- Foreshocks: 4.5 mb 6 May at 19:59
- Casualties: 990 dead 1,700–3,000 injured

The 1976 Friuli earthquake, also known in Italy as Terremoto del Friuli (Friulian earthquake) and Orcolat ("big, bad ogre"), occurred on 6 May 1976, at 21:00:13 (20:00:13 UTC) with a moment magnitude of 6.5 and a maximum EMS intensity of X (very destructive). The shock occurred in the Friuli region in northeast Italy near the town of Gemona del Friuli. 990 people were killed, up to about 3,000 were injured, and more than 157,000 were left homeless.

== Damage ==
Seventy-seven villages in the Friuli region were affected. Gemona del Friuli was greatly damaged, with about 400 people killed in the town itself. Despite extensive emergency measures and international aid by the end of 1976, 15,000 people were still living in camping trailers, train freight cars, 1,000 in tents and 25,000 in evacuation centres. The damage was estimated at $4.25 million. Much of the town has since been reconstructed. The tremor was felt in Venice, as well as neighbouring Austria, Switzerland and Slovenia (at the time part of Yugoslavia) and Germany. In Slovenia, the upper Soča valley and the Brda area was particularly affected, with the village of Breginj nearly completely destroyed. The earthquake damaged several buildings in Nova Gorica and was felt also in the Slovenian capital, Ljubljana. A total of 4,000 buildings were destroyed and 16,000 others were damaged across Slovenia, with around 80 percent of the population in the affected areas left homeless.

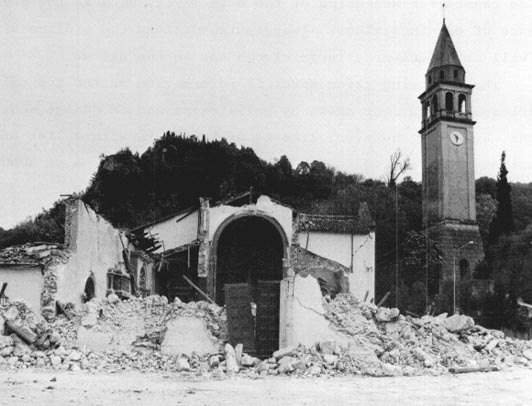
The parish church of Osoppo after the earthquake and before the Belltower collapsed in 15th September earthquake

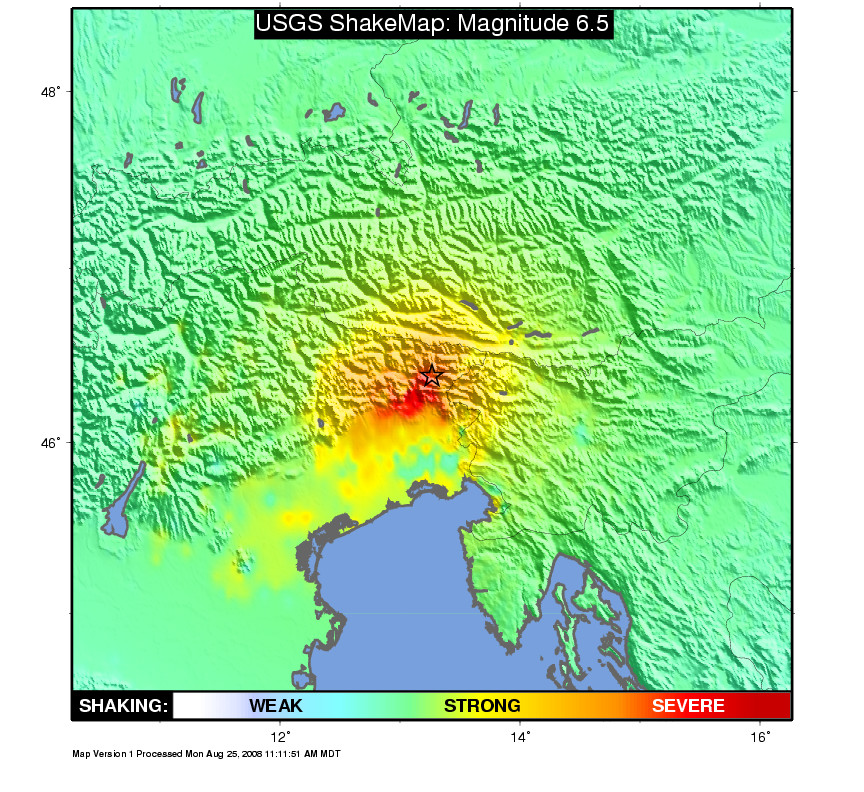
USGS ShakeMap showing the intensity of the 1976 Friuli earthquake

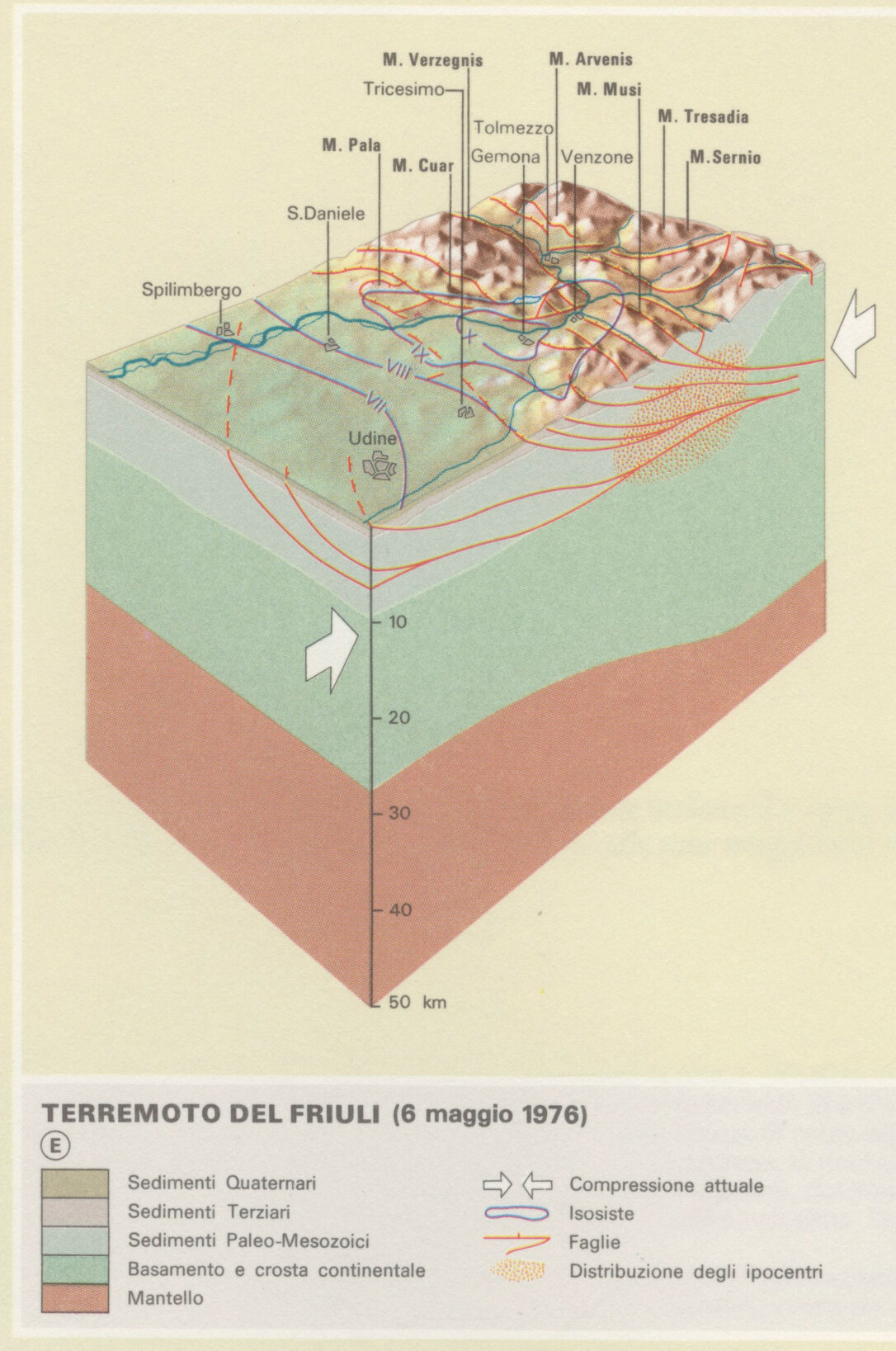
3D diagram of the geology of the affected area, showing the main geological layers, thrust faults, hypocentral area and the location of isoseismal lines

The Italian Government nominated Chamber of Deputies member Giuseppe Zamberletti as coordinator of aid efforts on behalf of the regional administration. The national funds were assigned to the reconstruction of the damaged buildings by Zamberletti and the regional council of Friuli-Venezia Giulia. From September to December 1976 all the earthquake victims were accommodated into prefabricated buildings, in order to better cope with the winter. Many local inhabitants lived in the Government supplied trailers and train freight cars for many years while homes were rebuilt. After Zamberletti's mandate the regional government of Friuli-Venezia Giulia was able to completely rebuild many towns, thanks to an accurate resource management, however some towns took over a decade to fully recover. Nowadays, many years after the tragedy, the State's intervention, the earthquake management and reconstruction in Friuli-Venezia Giulia are seen as a great example of efficiency and reliability.

=== Aftershocks ===
There were many aftershocks, with two sets of strong shocks on 11 September (16:31, 5.5 M_{s}and 16:35, 5.4 M_{s}) and again on 15 September (03:15, 6.0 M_{s} and 9:21, 5.9 M_{s}) 1976.

== Aftermath ==
This event also spurred the foundation of the Protezione Civile (the Italian Civil Defence body that deals with nationwide prevention and management of emergencies and catastrophic events).

In 2026 a comic book in memory of the 1976 Friuli earthquake was released

From April 25 to May 17 2026 the ARI (Associazione Radioamatori Italiani) Section of Udine ran a special amateur radio station to commemorate 50th anniversary of the earthquake. Amateur radio operators had provided vital communications when telephone and power lines failed, helping to coordinating rescue efforts.

== See also ==
- List of earthquakes in 1976
- List of earthquakes in Italy
- List of earthquakes in Slovenia
