= Torre (river) =

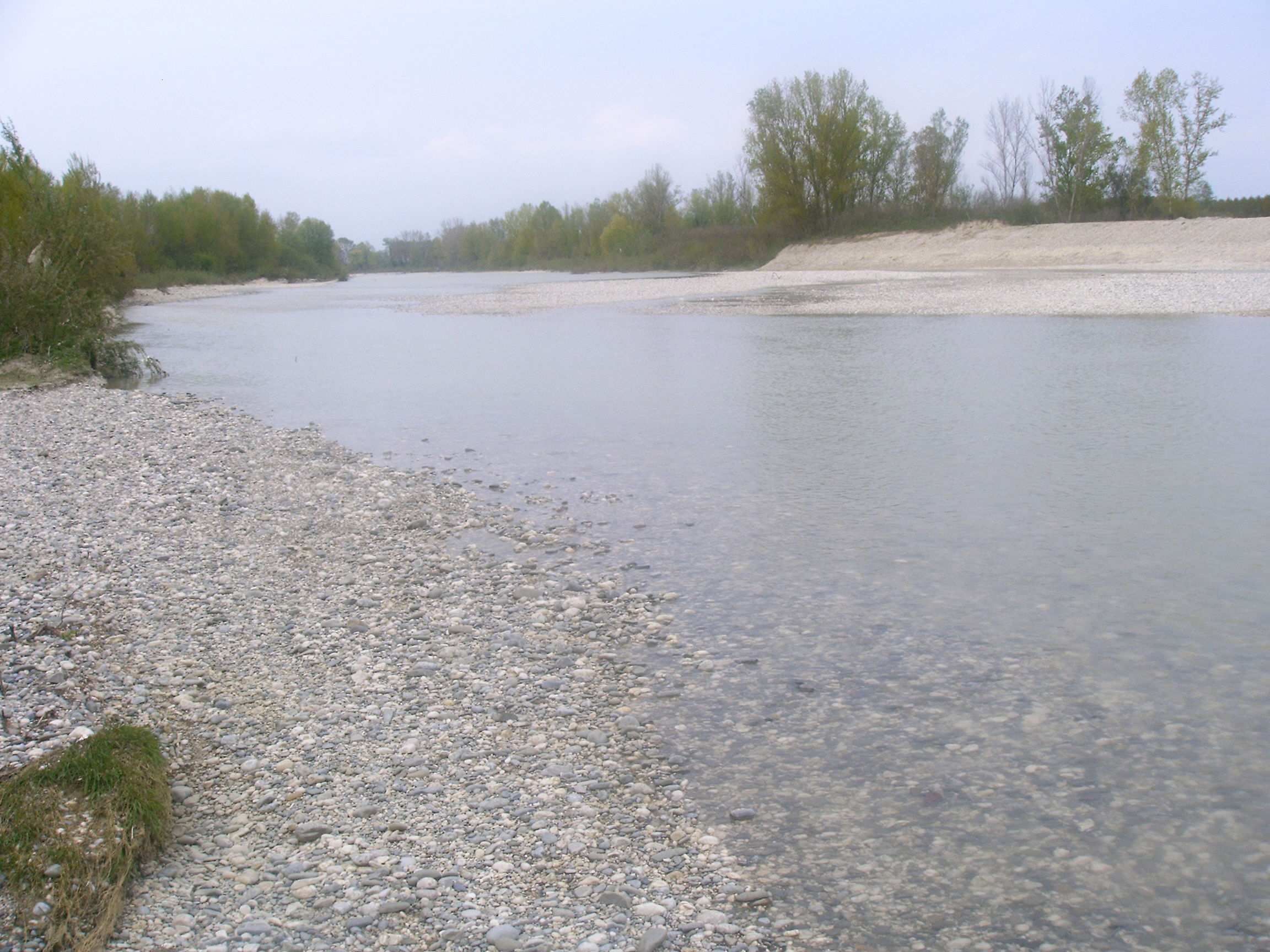
- Torre River, near Tapogliano, Italy

Location
- Country: Italy: Province of Udine and (briefly) Province of Gorizia

Physical characteristics
- Source
  - location: Julian Prealps
  - elevation: 1,000 m (3,300 ft)
- Mouth
  - location: Isonzo (Soča)
  - coordinates: 45.815°N 13.427°E

Basin features
- Progression: Soča→ Adriatic Sea

The Torre (Friulian: Tôr; Slovene: Ter) is a river of the Province of Udine in Friuli-Venezia Giulia, northeast Italy. It is the main right tributary of the Isonzo; the Torre together with its own tributary the Natisone drains a large part of the Isonzo basin.

The river rises in the Julian Prealps at around 1,000 metres (3,300 ft) above sea level. It flows through the communes of Tarcento and Reana del Rojale, where, as a result of the karst topography, it disappears underground. From close to the eastern periphery of the city of Udine it follows a discontinuous course until joined by the Natisone near Trivignano Udinese.

From here it flows briefly in the Province of Gorizia, receiving the torrent Judrio from the left, before returning to the Province of Udine and flowing into the Isonzo.
