= Breginj =

Breginj Bergogna, Bergogne
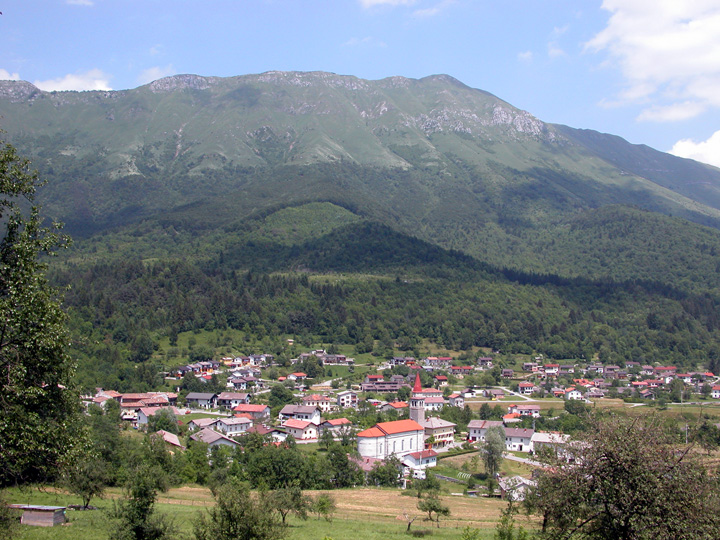

- Location in Slovenia
- Coordinates: 46°15′47.93″N 13°25′26.31″E
- Country: Slovenia
- Traditional region: Slovenian Littoral
- Statistical region: Gorizia
- Municipality: Kobarid

Area
  - Total: 19.08 km^{2} (7.37 sq mi)
- Elevation: 576.1 m (1,890 ft)

Population (2002)
  - Total: 251

Breginj (pronounced [bɾɛˈɡiːn]; locally Brgin and Bәrgin, Italian: Bergogna, Friulian: Bergogne) is a village in the Municipality of Kobarid in the Littoral region of Slovenia. It is located in the Breginj Combe.

== Name ==
Breginj was first attested in written sources in 1170 as Vergia and Vergin (and in 1275 as Bergona). The modern Slovene name Breginj is based on the local name Brgin. This was borrowed from the Romance name Bergona, which is of unknown origin.

== History ==
Until the 18th century, Breginj was part of the Republic of Venice, and it is still considered part of the historical region known as Venetian Slovenia. Breginj was a comune of the County of Gorizia (as Bergogna), and during Italian rule (1918–1943, nominally lasting until 1947) it was assigned to the Province of Udine, but only until 1927, when it was assigned to the new Italian Province of Gorizia.

== 1976 earthquake and aftermath ==
Most of the village was demolished by the 1976 Friuli earthquake, with only the Church of Saint Nicholas and a couple of buildings remaining standing. Breginj was the settlement in Slovenia most damaged by the earthquake and a new settlement of prefabricated houses was erected for its residents. Media reports at the time on the failure to preserve cultural heritage in the village were censored by Slovenia's communist government. One of the few remaining houses, a complex of three-story stone houses intertwined with corridors, has been declared an architectural and ethnological monument and houses a small museum.

== Notable people ==
Notable people that were born or lived in Breginj include:

- Jožef Školč (born 1960), liberal politician
