= Natisone =

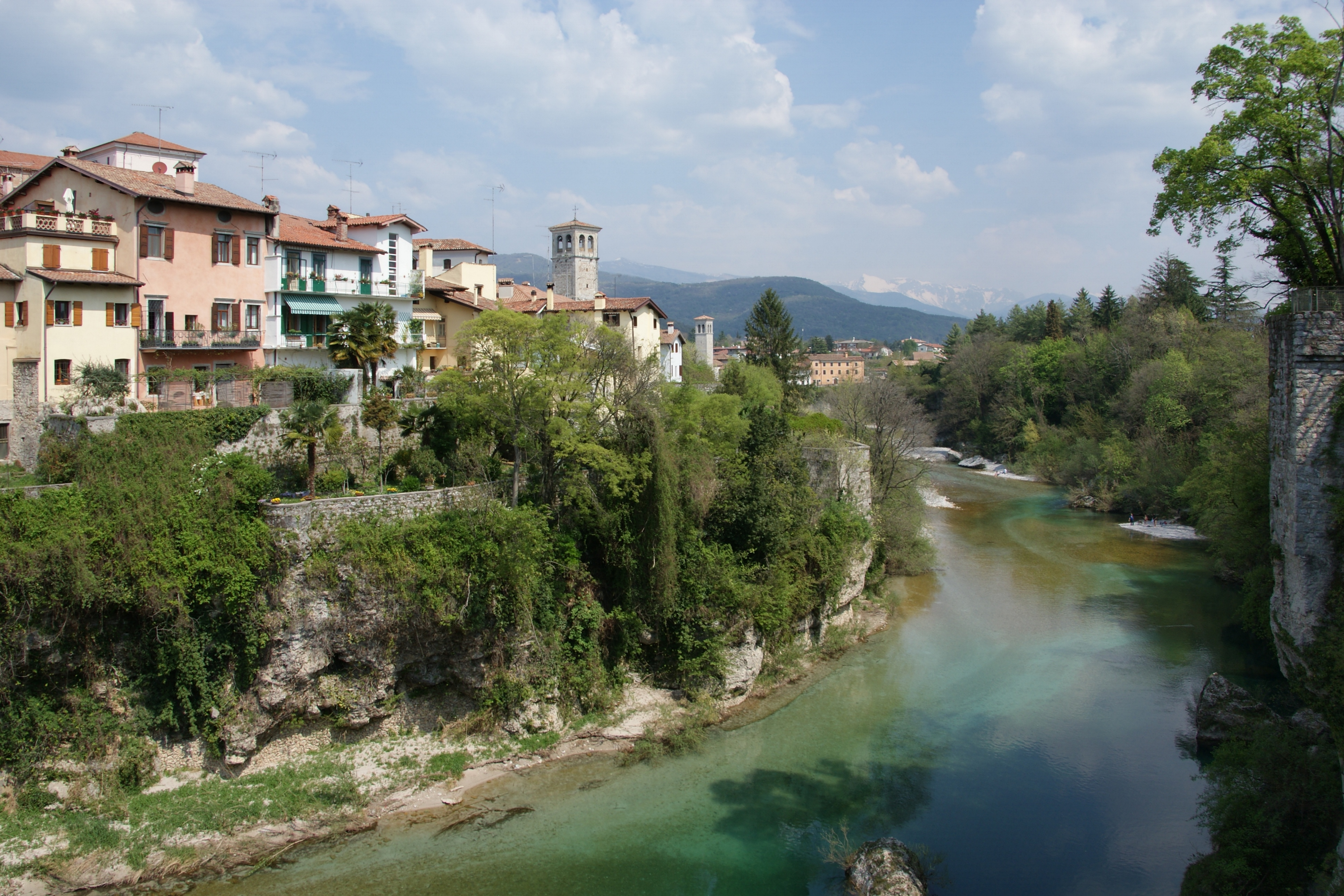
- The Natisone at Cividale del Friuli
- Native name: Nadiža (Slovene); Nadison (Friulian)

Location
- Country: Italy, Slovenia

Physical characteristics
- Source
  - location: Punta di Montemaggiore, Julian Prealps
  - elevation: 415 m (1,362 ft)
- Mouth
  - location: Torre
  - coordinates: 45.9453°N 13.3647°E
- Length: 60 km (37 mi)
- Basin size: 322 km^{2} (124 sq mi)

Basin features
- Progression: Torre→ Soča→ Adriatic Sea

The Natisone (Friulian: Nadison; Slovene: Nadiža; Latin: Natiso) is a 60-kilometre (37 mi) river in Slovenia and Italy. It flows for some time as a border river between Slovenia and Italy, continues in Slovenia and then crosses the border and continues in Eastern Friuli, in northeastern Italy. It is the main tributary of the Torre and a sub-affluent of the Isonzo. It has a pluvio-nival regime and belongs to the Adriatic Sea Basin.

The Natisone is formed at 415 metres (1,362 ft) above sea level on the border between Friuli and Slovenia by the confluence of two streams: the Rio Bianco (Slovene: Beli potok) and the Rio Nero (Slovene: Črni potok) which spring from the Punta di Montemaggiore and Gabrovec mountains. Before the confluence with the Torre, it passes through the municipalities of Pulfero and Cividale del Friuli.
