= Drežnica, Kobarid =

Drežnica
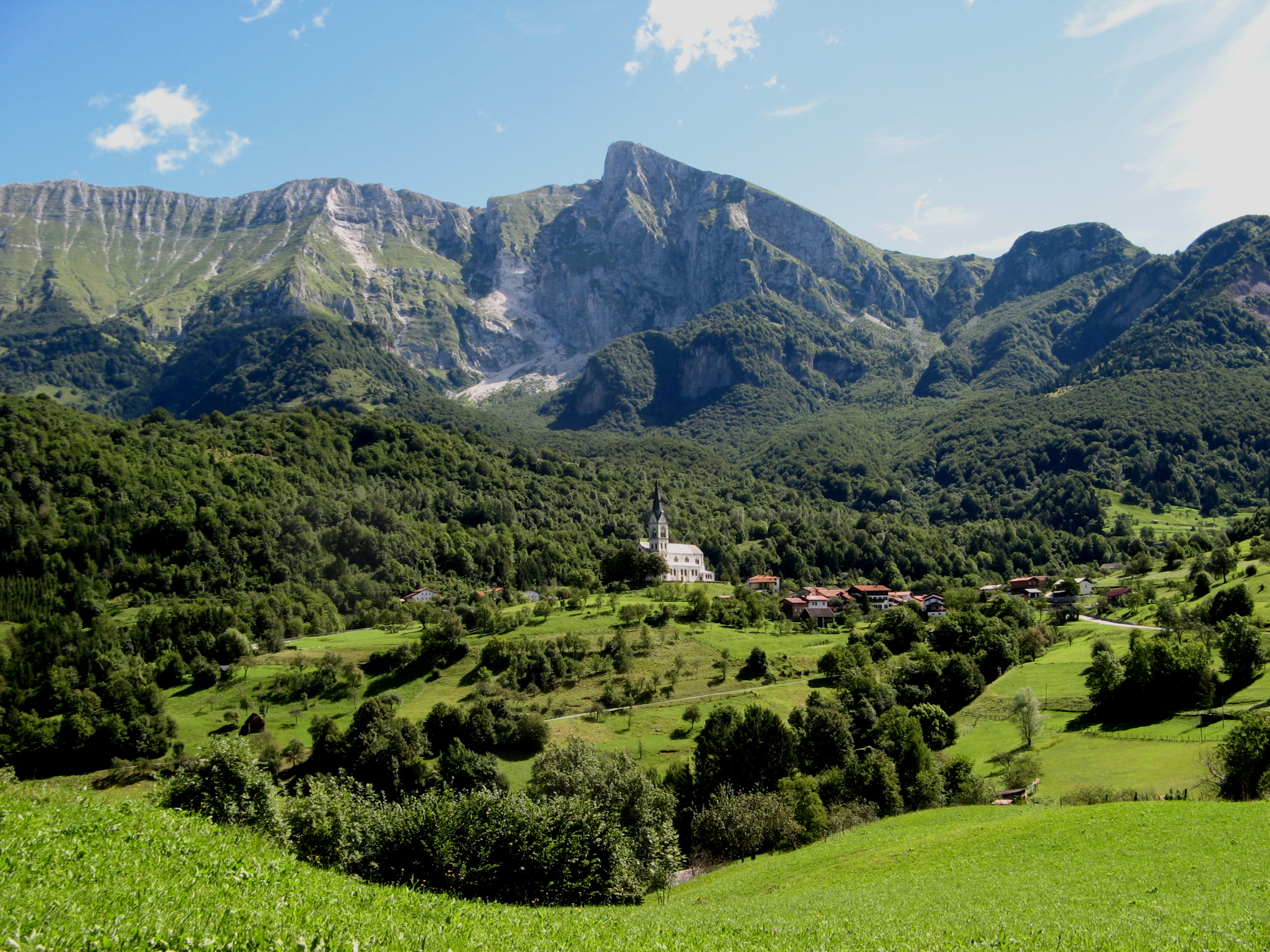

- Location in Slovenia
- Coordinates: 46°15′24.08″N 13°36′52.02″E
- Country: Slovenia
- Traditional region: Slovenian Littoral
- Statistical region: Gorizia
- Municipality: Kobarid

Area
  - Total: 2.16 km^{2} (0.83 sq mi)
- Elevation: 540.7 m (1,774 ft)

Population (2002)
  - Total: 256

Drežnica (pronounced [ˈdɾeːʒnitsa]; Italian: Dresenza) is a village in the Municipality of Kobarid in the Littoral region of Slovenia. It is located above the Soča River on a small plateau under Mount Krn. Together with the neighboring settlements of Koseč, Drežniške Ravne, Jezerca, and Magozd, it has around 565 inhabitants.

== Name ==
Drežnica was first mentioned in written sources in 1178 as Dresnitz and Dresniz (and in 1291 as Dresnica, and in 1351 as Dresnize). The name is a univerbized form derived from *Dręzžьna voda (literally, 'forest creek') or *Dręzžьna vьsь (literally, 'forest village'), derived from the Slavic word *dręzga 'forest, thicket'. Place names of similar origin include Drežnik and Dresden.

== History ==
In 1747, the Parish of Drežnica was founded. In the late 19th century and early 20th century, it was a village with more than 1,000 inhabitants. During that time, the current church was built on the site of a previous, smaller one.

At the outbreak of World War I, most of the inhabitants were evacuated to the interior of the Austro-Hungarian Empire. In the first months after the Italian attack on Austria-Hungary, the village was occupied by Italian troops and the rest of the inhabitants were sent to internment camps in Italy, where many died of malnutrition and bad conditions. The village was almost completely destroyed during the Battles of the Isonzo, but the church remained completely intact.

After the war, in 1918, it was occupied by Italian troops and annexed to Italy in 1920. Between 1920 and 1941, many locals emigrated abroad, mostly to Argentina and Yugoslavia, and the number of inhabitants dropped significantly.

During World War II, especially after the Italian armistice, the area was an important center of Slovenian partisan resistance. Between September 10 and November 1, Drežnica was part of the liberated territory, known as the Kobarid Republic, administered by the local anti-Fascist resistance (composed of Partisans, former TIGR members, and unaffiliated insurgents). In November 1943, it was occupied by Nazi German forces, but the Partisan resistance remained strong in the surrounding mountainous area around Mount Krn. In 1945, it was liberated by the Partisans and put under Yugoslav military administration.

Between June 1945 and September 1947, Drežnica was cut off from Kobarid, which was put under Anglo-American military administration. This caused a severe economic crisis, and many people emigrated from the village, either to the nearby Anglo-American zone, to Tolmin, or to the interior of Slovenia. In September 1947, it was officially annexed to Yugoslavia and included in the Socialist Republic of Slovenia.

== Church ==
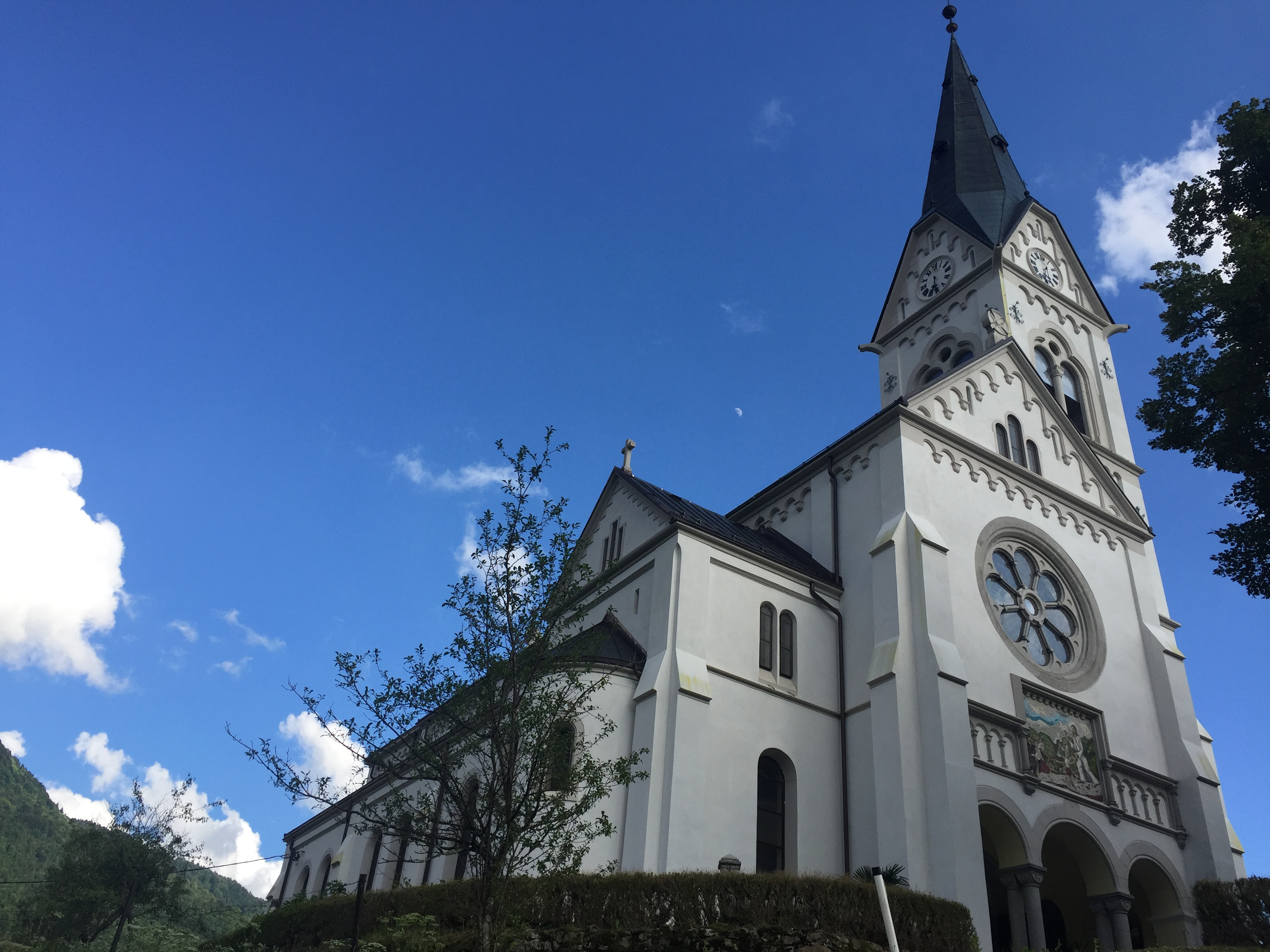
Facade and north side of Sacred Heart Church (2017)

A notable structure in the village is the church, dedicated to the Sacred Heart. It was built on the site of an older building dedicated to Saint Julius. The belfry was only completed in 1986 and is 52 m high. The paintings inside the church were made during World War II by the Slovene modernist painters Zoran Mušič and Avgust Černigoj.

In July 2009, the Slovenian politician and former Prime Minister Janez Janša married his current spouse, Urška Bačovnik, in the church.
