= Municipality of Kobarid =

Municipality of Slovenia

Municipality of Kobarid Občina Kobarid
- Municipality
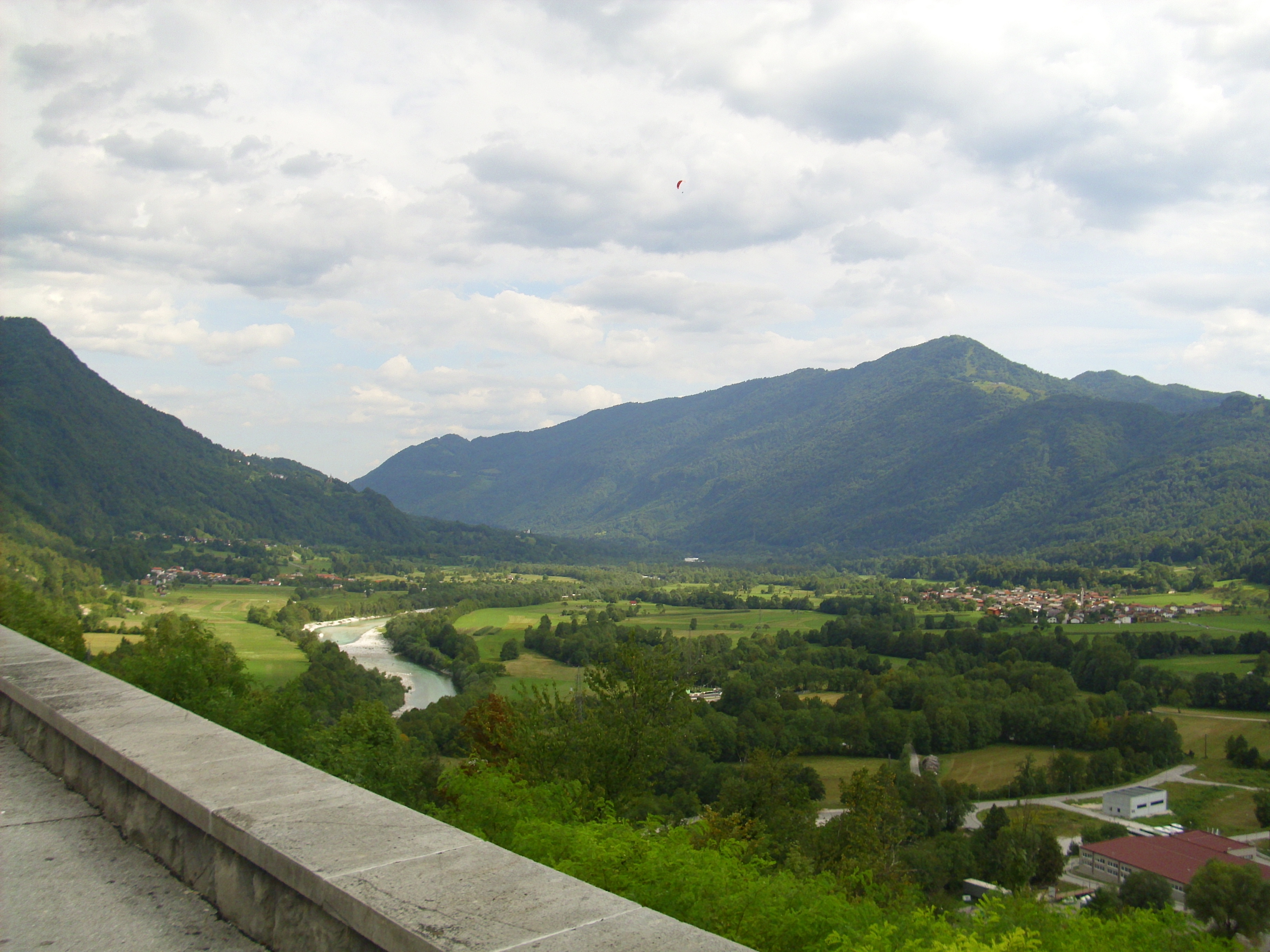

- Location of the Municipality of Kobarid in Slovenia
- Coordinates: 46°14′47″N 13°34′43″E
- Country: Slovenia

Government
  - Mayor: Darja Hauptman (SDS)

Area
  - Total: 192.7 km^{2} (74.4 sq mi)

Population (2010)
  - Total: 4,217
  - Density: 21.88/km^{2} (56.68/sq mi)
- Time zone: UTC+01 (CET)
  - Summer (DST): UTC+02 (CEST)

The Municipality of Kobarid (pronounced [kɔbaˈɾiːt]; Slovene: Občina Kobarid; Italian: Comune di Caporetto) is a municipality in the Upper Soča Valley in western Slovenia, near the Italian border. The seat of the municipality is the town of Kobarid.

The municipality was established on 3 October 1994, when the former larger Municipality of Tolmin was subdivided into the municipalities of Bovec, Kobarid, and Tolmin. It borders Italy.

== Settlements ==
In addition to the municipal seat of Kobarid, the municipality also includes the following settlements:

- Avsa
- Borjana
- Breginj
- Drežnica
- Drežniške Ravne
- Homec
- Idrsko
- Jevšček
- Jezerca
- Koseč
- Kred
- Krn
- Ladra
- Libušnje
- Livek
- Livške Ravne
- Logje
- Magozd
- Mlinsko
- Perati
- Podbela
- Potoki
- Robidišče
- Robič
- Sedlo
- Smast
- Stanovišče
- Staro Selo
- Sužid
- Svino
- Trnovo ob Soči
- Vrsno

== History ==
The area has been inhabited since prehistoric times. Archeological remains from the Hallstatt period have been found in the area. In the 6th century, it was settled by Slavic tribes, ancestors of the modern Slovenes. During the Middle Ages, it was first part of the Patriarchate of Aquileia, and later of Tolmin County, before being included in the Habsburg monarchy in the 15th century, like the majority of Slovene-speaking territories. With the exception of a brief period between 1809 and 1813, when it was included under the Napoleonic Kingdom of Italy, it remained under the Austrian rule until 1918.

In the mid-19th century, the area became an important center of the Slovene national revival. During World War I, the whole area was the theatre of the Battles of the Isonzo, fought between Italy and Austria-Hungary. After the end of the war in 1918, the region was occupied by the Italian Army, and in 1920 it was officially annexed to Italy, and included in the Julian March region. Between 1922 and 1943, the Kobarid area, which had an exclusively Slovene-speaking population, was submitted to a policy of violent Fascist Italianization. Many locals emigrated to the neighbouring Kingdom of Yugoslavia. Several Italian military memorials were built in the area.

Immediately after the Italian armistice in September 1943, the region was liberated by a Partisan uprising, and became the center of large liberated area of around 2,500 square kilometers known as the Kobarid Republic, administered by the Liberation Front of the Slovenian People. The area was retaken by German forces in early November 1943, who remained until May 1945 and the arrival of the Yugoslav People's Army.

In September 1947, the Paris Peace Treaties awarded the area to Yugoslavia. Several hundred inhabitants, especially from the Breginj area, chose emigration to Italy rather than becoming citizens of a communist state.

With the breakup of Yugoslavia in 1991, the Kobarid area became part of the independent Slovenian state.

== Politics ==
The Municipality of Kobarid is governed by a mayor, elected by popular vote every four years, and a municipal council of 16 members. In both the local and the national elections, Kobarid tends to favor conservative parties, especially the Slovenian Democratic Party (which is the largest party in the municipal council). However, in the mayoral elections, the voters have frequently supported independent candidates. The current mayor Darja Hauptmann is a member of the Slovenian Democratic Party.

== Notable natives ==
Notable natives of the Municipality of Kobarid include:

- Anton Gregorčič, conservative politician
- Simon Gregorčič, poet (born in the village of Vrsno)
- Joža Lovrenčič, expressionist poet and educator
- Andrej Manfreda, anti-Fascist resistance fighter, member of TIGR
- Josip Pagliaruzzi, poet
- Simon Rutar, historian (born in the village of Krn)
- Jožef Školč, liberal politician (born in Breginj)
- Ivan Urbančič, philosopher (born in Robič)
- Andrej Uršič, journalist, political activist

== See also ==
- Battles of the Isonzo
- County of Gorizia and Gradisca
- Goriška
- Slovene Littoral
