= Krn =

Mountain in Slovenia

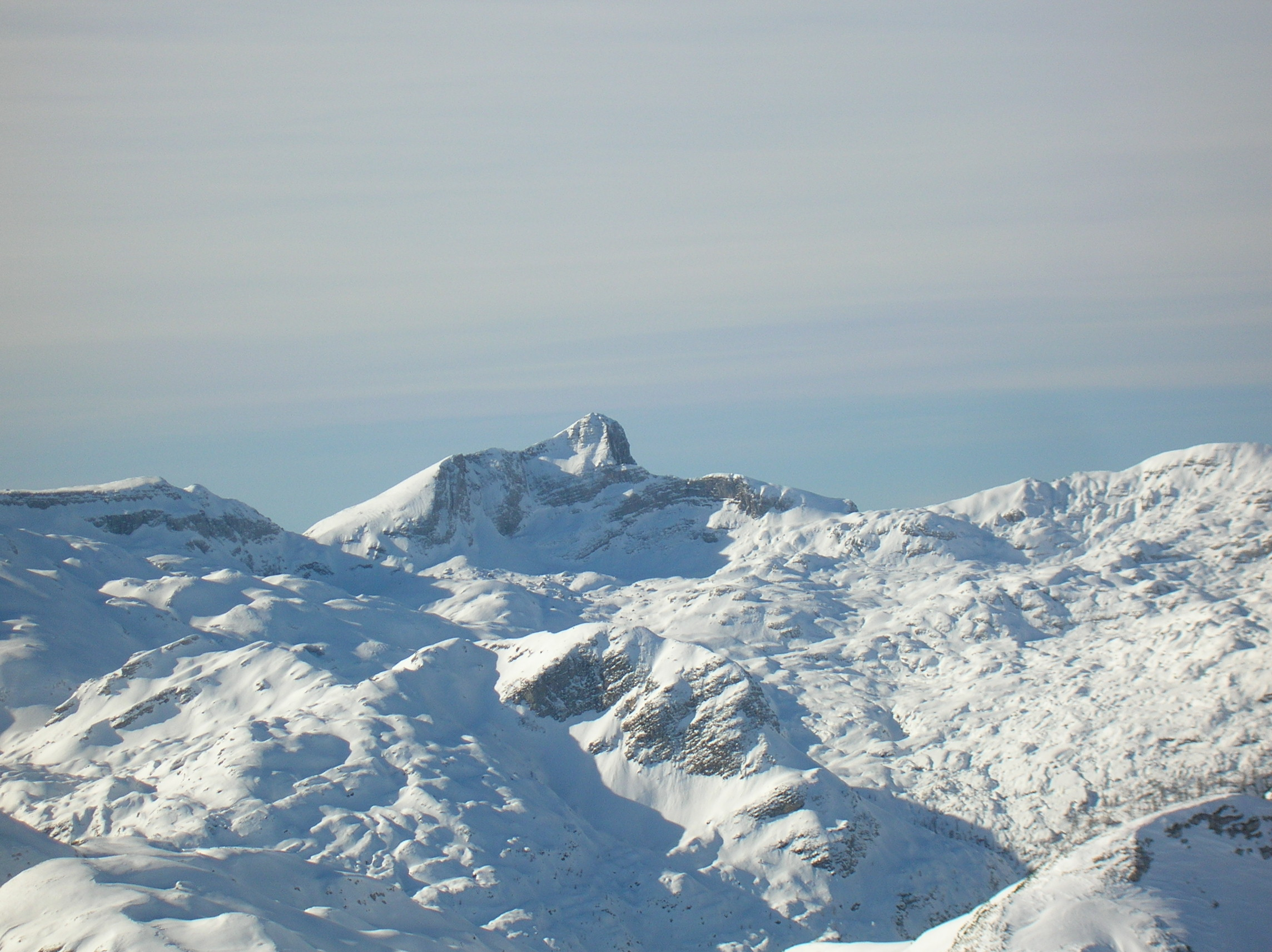
- Northern face in winter

Highest point
- Elevation: 2,244 m (7,362 ft)
- Prominence: 605 m (1,985 ft)
- Coordinates: 46°15′59″N 13°39′32″E

Geography
- Location within Slovenia
- Location: Slovenia
- Parent range: Julian Alps

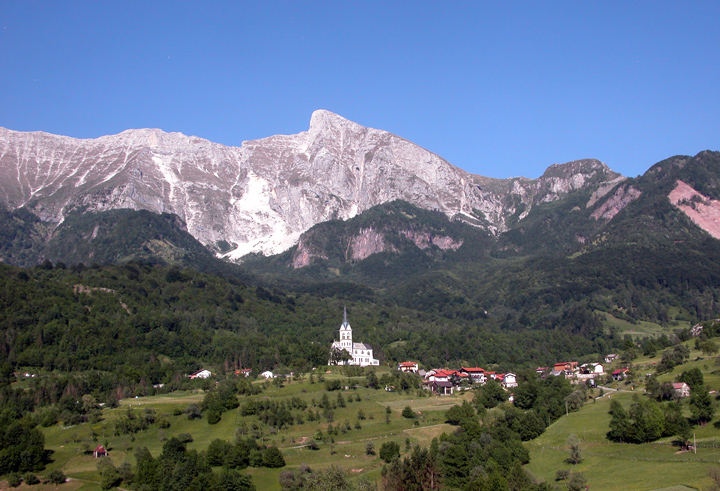
View of the village of Drežnica and Mt. Krn from the west

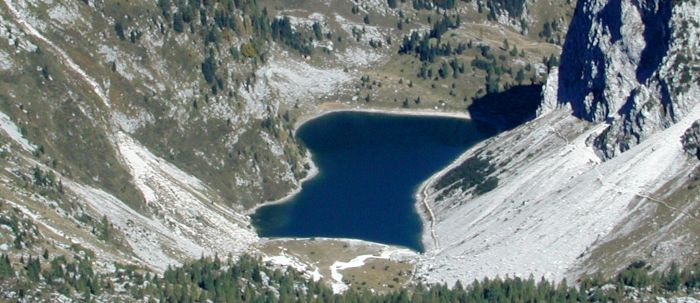
Lake Krn

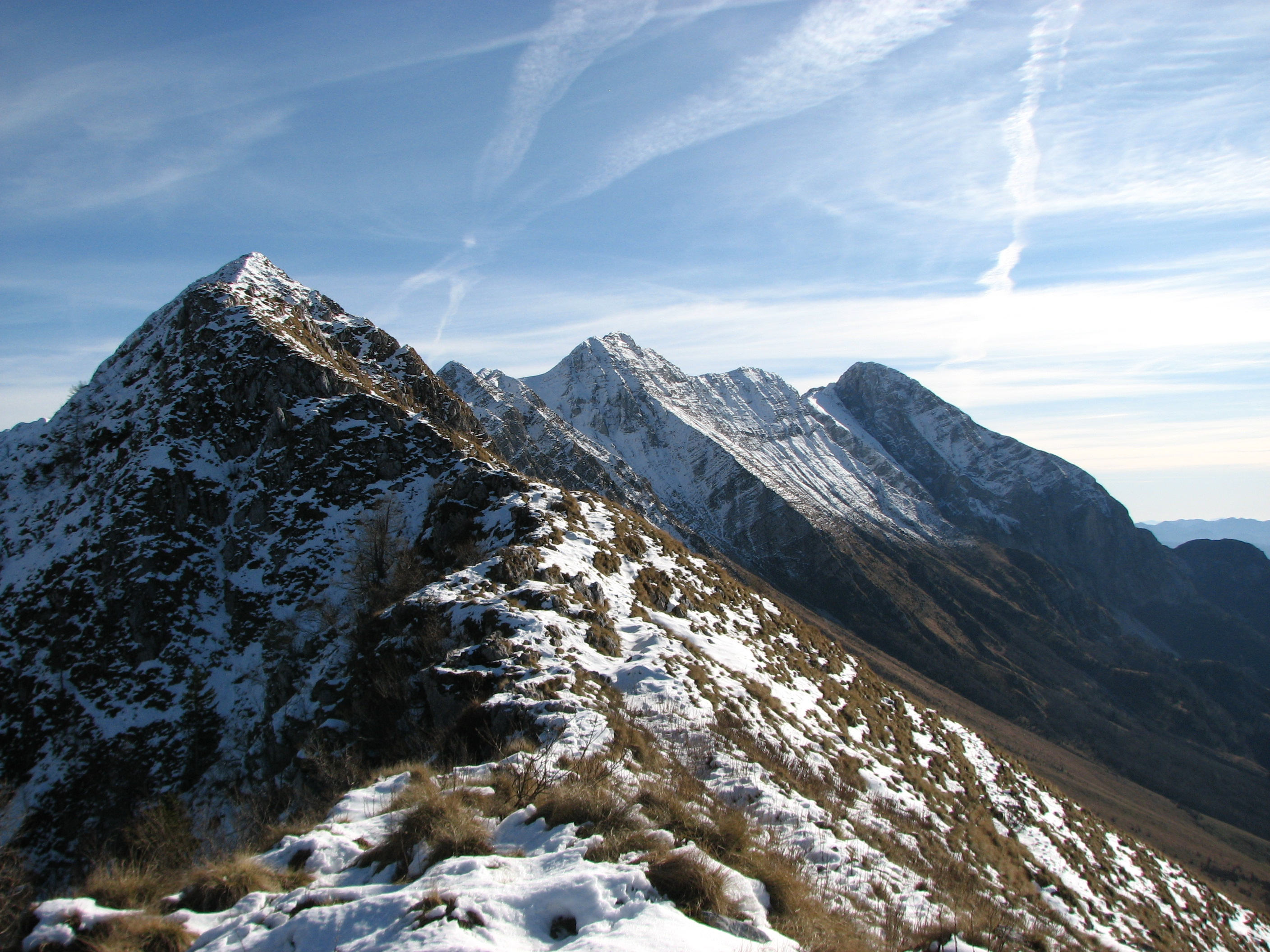
View of the Krn Mountains from Mt. Kal: Mt. Vršič, Vrata Pass, Mt. Krnčica, Mt. Middle Peak and Mt. Krn

Krn (pronounced [ˈkəɾn]; 2,244 metres or 7,362 feet) is a mountain in northwestern Slovenia. It is the highest peak of the Krn Mountains, a sub-chain of the southwestern Julian Alps.

== Geography ==
Krn is located about 50 kilometres (31 mi) from the Adriatic. The Soča River flows to the west of the peak, while the smaller Lepenjica and Tolminka pass northeast and southwest of it.

On the southern slope of the mountain lie the small villages of Vrsno, Krn, Drežnica, Drežniške Ravne, and Magozd. On the northern side lies Lake Krn, the largest glacial lake in Slovenia. The mountain is known for its mighty western face, best seen from Kobarid or Drežnica.

== History ==
During the First World War, the Battles of the Isonzo took place in the area. The 3rd Regiment of Alpini had taken Krn's peak on 16 June 1915 in a daring raid, where the elite Italian unit climbed its cliffs "with their boots swaddled in sacks of straw to reduce noise," some of them barefoot, and others wearing only socks, and battled the Hungarian battalion of the 4th Honved Regiment. "It was a glorious success, the first of the war, presaging others that never materialized."

The top of neighbouring Mount Batognica (2,164 m or 7,100 ft) was blown off by an accidental weapons-depot explosion during the war. Wreckage remains scattered around the peak.

== Lodges ==
- On the southern side near the top is the Gomišček Krn Shelter (Gomiščkovo zavetišče na Krnu; 2,182 m or 7,159 ft);
- On the northern side near the lake stands the Krn Lakes Lodge (Planinski dom pri Krnskih jezerih; 1,385 m or 4,544 ft);
- On the Kuhinja Pasture stands the Kuhinja Pasture Lodge (Dom na planini Kuhinja; 991 m or 3,251 ft);
- Below its northern slope, in Lepena, stands the Dr. Klement Jug Lodge in Lepena (Dom dr. Klementa Juga v Lepeni; 700 m or 2,300 ft).

== Access to the summit ==
- 3 hours from Kuhinja Pasture
- 5 hours from Dr. Klement Jug Lepena Lodge
- 5 hours from Drežnica, via the Silvo Koren Route
- 7¾ hours from the Savica Lodge over the Prehodavci Pass

== Bibliography ==
Notes

References

- "Fighting on the roof of the World: A climb to victory". The Illustrated London News. London. July 10, 1915. ISSN 0019-2422. OCLC 1752679. Archived from the original on July 10, 1915.
- Schindler, John R. (2001). Isonzo: The Forgotten Sacrifice of the Great War. Greenwood Publishing Group. ISBN 9780275972042. - Total pages: 409
- Thompson, Mark (2009). The White War: Life and Death on the Italian Front, 1915–1919. Faber and Faber. ISBN 9780571250080. - Total pages: 496

== Literature ==
- Planinski vodnik Julijske Alpe, PZS, 2003, ISBN 961-6156-47-0
- Andrej Stritar, Vodnik Julijske Alpe - Gore nad Sočo, 1997, ISBN 961-6027-13-1
