= Vrsno =

Vrsno may refer to:

- Vrsno, Kobarid, a village in Slovenia
- Vrsno, Croatia, a village near Šibenik
