= Perati =

- Location in Slovenia
- Coordinates: 46°12′8.79″N 13°35′33.89″E
- Country: Slovenia
- Traditional region: Slovenian Littoral
- Statistical region: Gorizia
- Municipality: Kobarid

Area
  - Total: 0.11 km^{2} (0.042 sq mi)
- Elevation: 827.9 m (2,716 ft)

Population (2015)
  - Total: 19

Perati (pronounced [ˈpeːɾati]) is a small settlement near Livek in the Municipality of Kobarid in the Littoral region of Slovenia.

== History ==
Perati was a hamlet of Avsa until 1997, when it was administratively separated and made a settlement in its own right.
