= Goriška =

Historical region in Slovenia

Coordinates: 45°57′19.06″N 13°38′5.36″E

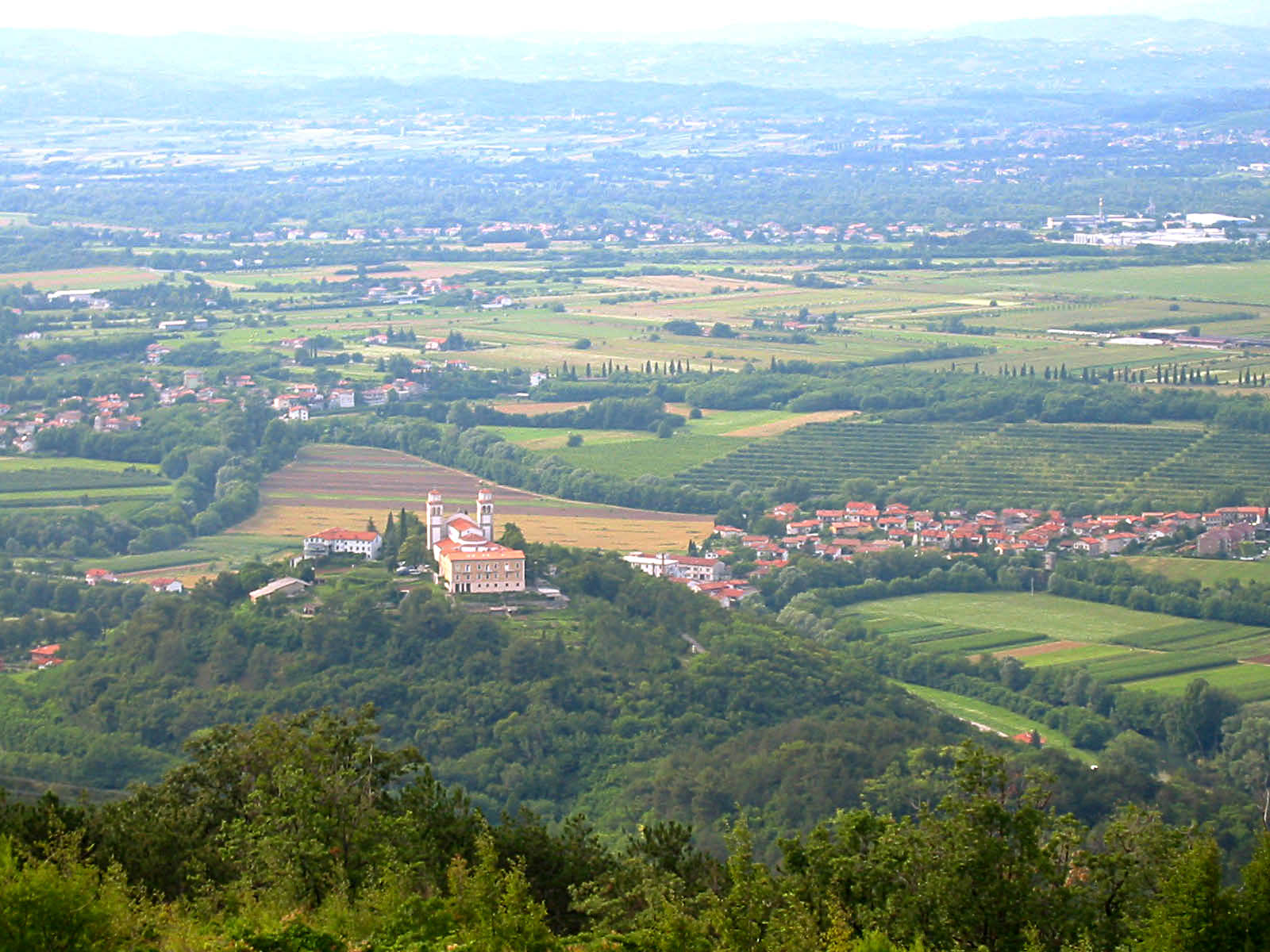
The plain at the confluence of the Soča and Vipava rivers. In the foreground, Miren Castle and the village of Bilje.

Goriška (English: the Gorizia Region) is a historical region in western Slovenia on the border with Italy. It comprises the northern part of the wider traditional region of the Slovenian Littoral (Primorska). The name Goriška is an adjective referring to the city of Gorizia, its historical and cultural centre.

== Geography ==
The region stretches from the Julian Alps (Triglav) in the north down the Soča River to Nova Gorica and the Karst Plateau in the hinterland of Trieste. It encompasses the following municipalities (from north to south):

- Bovec
- Kobarid
- Tolmin
- Cerkno
- Kanal ob Soči
- Brda
- Nova Gorica
- Šempeter-Vrtojba
- Renče-Vogrsko
- Miren-Kostanjevica
- Ajdovščina
- Vipava
- Komen
- Sežana

It is entirely included in the Gorizia Statistical Region, except for the southernmost municipalities of Komen and Sežana, which are part of the Coastal–Karst Statistical Region.

Goriška borders on Upper Carniola in the northeast and Inner Carniola in the east. In the south, it is confined by Slovenian Istria and the Trieste city limits. Together with the adjacent Italian provinces of Gorizia, Udine and Pordenone in the west, it may be considered part of the larger Friuli region.

== History ==
Upon the Slavic settlement of the Eastern Alps from about 600, Slavic tribes in contact with the neighbouring principality of Carantania moved into the Karst Plateau into the eastern Bassa Friulana, then part of the Lombard Duchy of Friuli. After Charlemagne had defeated the Kingdom of the Lombards at the 774 Siege of Pavia, the territory was incorporated into the Carolingian frontier March of Friuli. Margrave Berengar had himself crowned King of Italy in 888, while the adjacent marches of Carinthia (former Carantania) and Carniola had become part of East Francia upon the 843 Treaty of Verdun. When in 951 the East Frankish king Otto I of Germany invaded Italy, he seized the Friulan lands as part of the larger March of Verona, ruled by the Bavarian, later Carinthian dukes.

In 1077 King Henry IV of Germany enfeoffed the Patriarchs of Aquileia with Friuli; the town of Gorizia (Görz) became the power base of their advocates from the comital Meinhardiner dynasty. They were able to acquire and consolidate an immediate home territory, the County of Görz, which they retained even after the Friulan territory of Aquileia was conquered by the Republic of Venice in 1420 and incorporated into the Domini di Terraferma. When the House of Gorizia became extinct in 1500, their county fell to the House of Habsburg; with neighbouring Carinthia and Carniola it was administrated within Inner Austria.

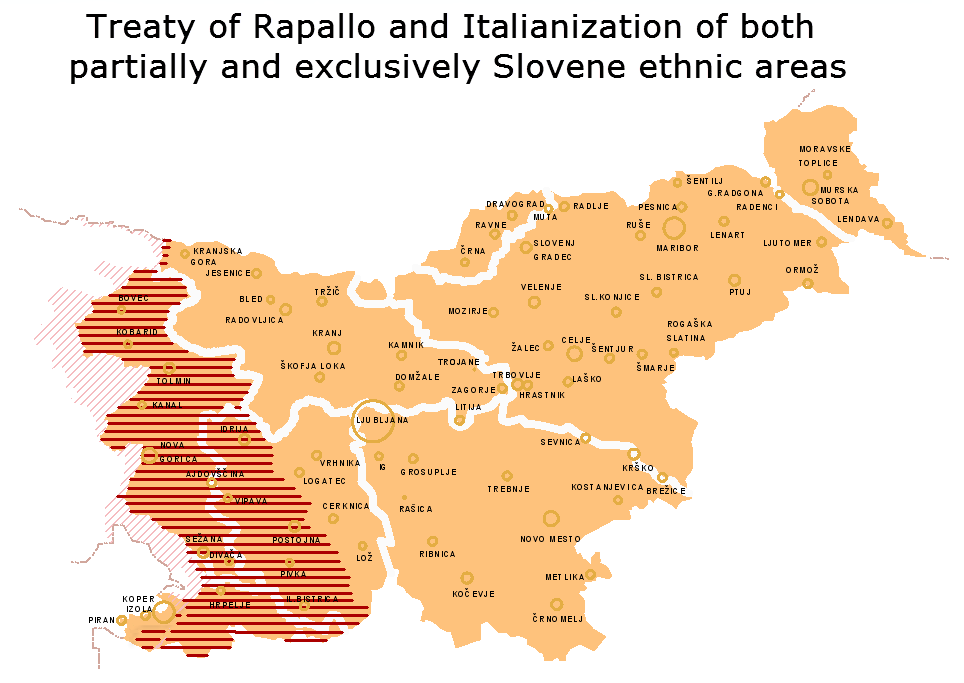
Goriška, Inner Carniola and Slovene Istria territories annexed by Italy according to the Treaty of Rapallo

From 1754 onwards, the region belonged to the Princely County of Gorizia and Gradisca, a crown land of the Habsburg monarchy. When in 1809 Napoleon created the short-lived French Illyrian Provinces, he drew the border with the re-established Kingdom of Italy in the west along the Soča/Isonzo River. After the 1815 Congress of Vienna, the entire crown land of Gorizia and Gradisca with Trieste and the March of Istria as well as Carinthia and Carniola formed the Austrian Kingdom of Illyria with its capital at Ljubljana (Laibach).

Part of the Austrian Littoral from 1849, the Soča Valley was the site of the fierce Battles of the Isonzo on the Italian front of Austria-Hungary during World War I. According to the 1919 Treaty of Saint-Germain-en-Laye, the whole Littoral region passed to the Kingdom of Italy. Together with the adjacent Inner Carniolan and Istrian lands, it was incorporated into the Julian March administrative region. The border with the Kingdom of Yugoslavia was confirmed in the 1920 Treaty of Rapallo. During the Fascist regime the Slovene minority was submitted to a violent policy of Italianization, against the resistance of the TIGR movement.

After World War II, the present borders were established: most of the Slovene-inhabited areas were ceded to the newly established Yugoslav republic of Slovenia, while the town of Gorizia itself with Gradisca and the territory downstream the Isonzo River to the Adriatic coast were left to Italy.

== Notable people ==
Well-known people from the region include

- architects Max Fabiani and Vojteh Ravnikar
- poets Simon Gregorčič, Alojz Gradnik, Srečko Kosovel, and Matej Bor
- writers Danilo Lokar, France Bevk, Ivan Pregelj, and Ciril Kosmač
- aviation pioneer Edvard Rusjan
- artists Veno Pilon, Zoran Mušič, and Anton Gojmir Kos
- military men Anton Haus, Sergej Mašera, Janko Premrl (nom de guerre Vojko), and Leon Rupnik
- the composer of the melody for the Slovenian national anthem Stanko Premrl
- sportsman Jure Franko
- entrepreneur Ivo Boscarol
- politicians Engelbert Besednjak, Drago Marušič, Marko Natlačen, Robert Golob and Borut Pahor
- scholars Simon Rutar, Milko Kos, Dušan Pirjevec Ahac, Ivo Urbančič, and Dean Komel.

== See also ==
- Slovene Littoral
- University of Nova Gorica
- Vipava Valley
- Venetian Slovenia
