= KRN (disambiguation) =

KRN or krn may refer to:

- K. R. Narayanan, (1920–2005), former president of India
- Krajowa Rada Narodowa, a self-proclaimed communist parliament
- Krn, a mountain in Slovenia
- Krn (settlement), a small village below Mount Krn
- Karnataka, a state in southern India (postal code)
- krn, the ISO 639-3 code for Sapo language
- Kiruna Airport, the IATA code KRN
- Karinou Airlines, the ICAO code KRN
- Kharian City railway station, the station code KRN
- Kurunegala railway station, the station code KRN
- Krones, the FWB code KRN
