= Robič =

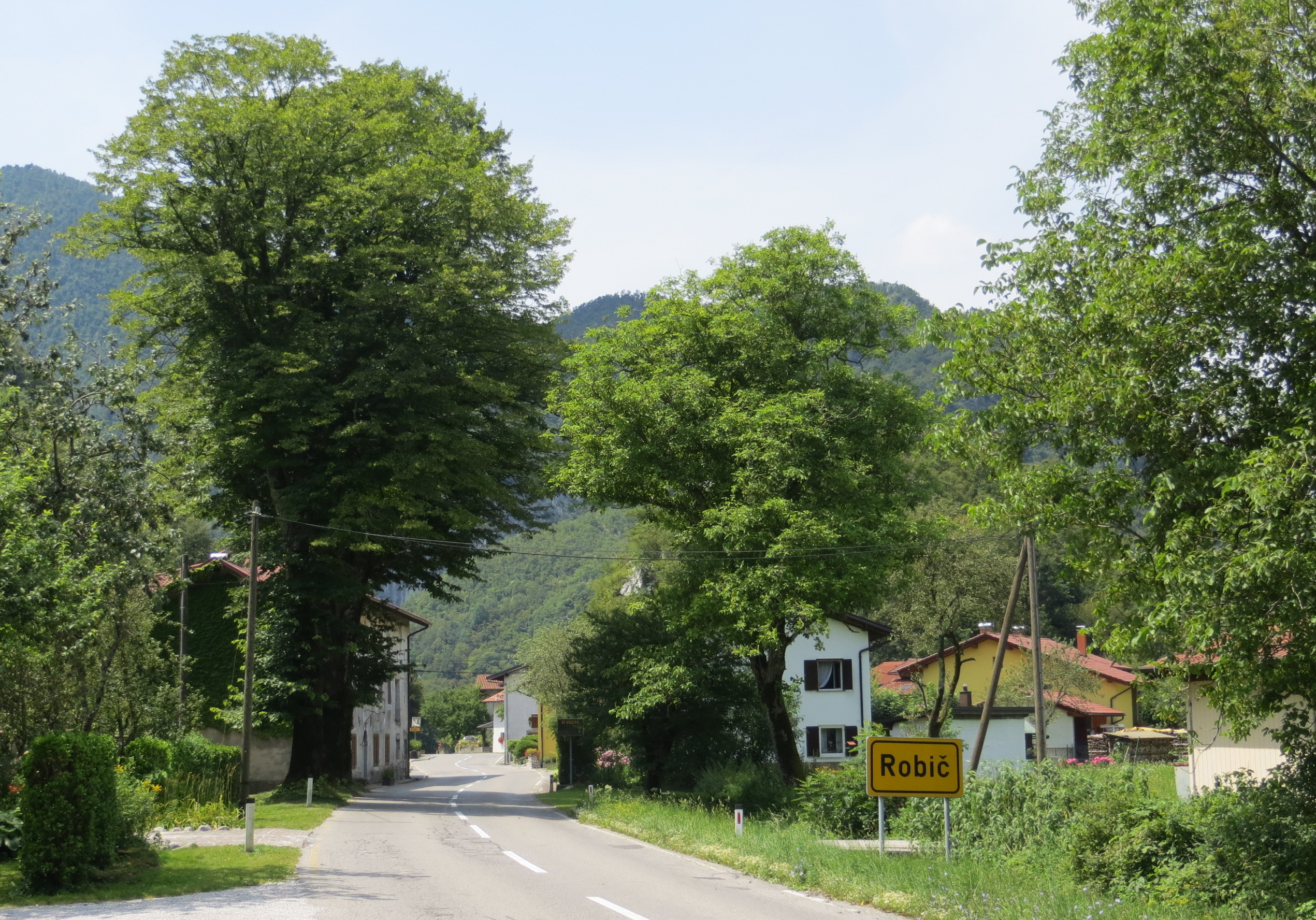

- Location in Slovenia
- Coordinates: 46°14′39.08″N 13°30′51.81″E
- Country: Slovenia
- Traditional region: Slovenian Littoral
- Statistical region: Gorizia
- Municipality: Kobarid

Area
  - Total: 6.6 km^{2} (2.5 sq mi)
- Elevation: 245.9 m (807 ft)

Population (2002)
  - Total: 32

Robič (pronounced [ˈɾoːbitʃ]; Italian: Robis) is a settlement below Mount Matajur on the left bank of the Nadiža River in the Municipality of Kobarid in the Littoral region of Slovenia.

== Notable people ==
Notable people that were born or lived in Robič include:

- Ivan Urbančič (1930–2016), philosopher

== Gallery ==
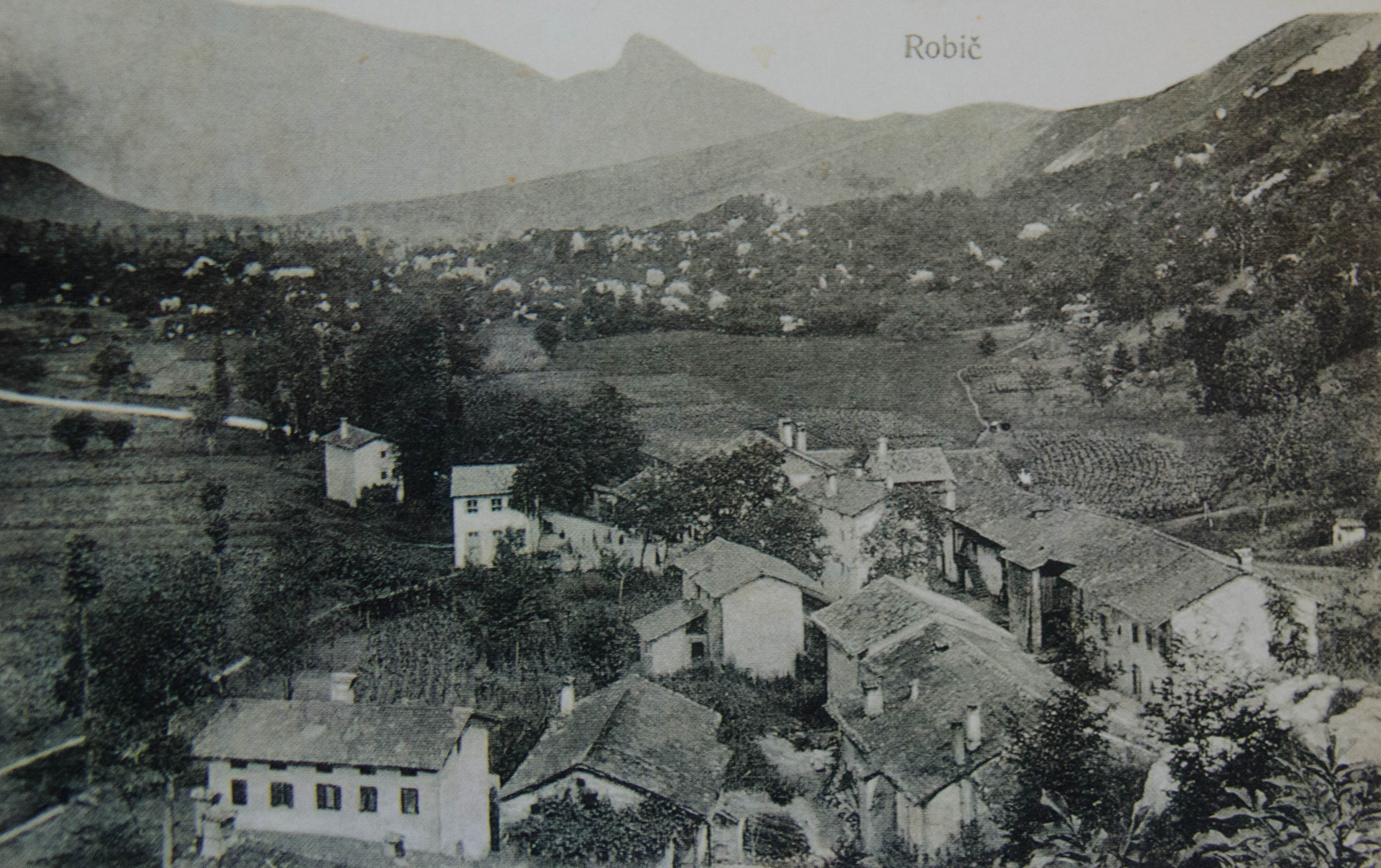
1910 postcard of Robič
