= Jevšček =

- Location in Slovenia
- Coordinates: 46°11′21.78″N 13°34′38.19″E
- Country: Slovenia
- Traditional region: Slovenian Littoral
- Statistical region: Gorizia
- Municipality: Kobarid

Area
  - Total: 1.42 km^{2} (0.55 sq mi)
- Elevation: 805.2 m (2,642 ft)

Population (2002)
  - Total: 31

Jevšček (pronounced [ˈjeːu̯ʃtʃək]) is a small settlement in the Municipality of Kobarid in the Littoral region of Slovenia, right on the border with Italy.

== Name ==
Like similar names (e.g., Jelševec, Jelševica, and Jelšje), the name Jevšček is derived from the common noun jelša 'alder', referring to the local vegetation.

== History ==
During the 12th Battle of the Isonzo, also known as the Battle of Caporetto, Jevšček was the location of the breakthrough to Mount Matajur. Mount Matajur was designated a key geographical goal of the German Alpine corps striking from Tolmin under the leadership of Hermann Freiherr von Stein. On the night of October 25, 1917, Erwin Rommel encamped at the Brgolic farm in Jevšček and studied his map for his advance on Mount Matajur. For his accomplishments during the battle and the conquest of Mount Matajur, Rommel later received the Prussian award Pour le Mérite.

At the invitation of the Kobarid Museum, the Italian journalist and writer Paolo Rumiz visited Jevšček in 2017 during the filming of his documentary La Strada di Rommel. La Strada di Rommel follows Rommel's path as described in his book Infantry Attacks. The documentary also follows Rommel to Jevšček and also makes a stop at the outdoor museum at the Brgolič farm, where Rommel encamped and made his plans for the conquest of Mount Matajur during the battle, and at the Nježna house.

== Cultural heritage ==
=== Nježna house ===
In 2015, a cultural monument of local importance, the Nježna house (Nježna hiša), was renovated with the help of EU funds. The house is named after its last inhabitant, Pepa Nježna.

=== Jevšček History Park and outdoor museum ===
On the centenary of Battle of Caporetto in 2017, the local community, with the cooperation of the Kobarid Museum and the Walk of Peace foundation, prepared an outdoor museum the Jevšček History Park. The project renovated an Italian First World War trench that the Italian army had left unoccupied during the battle; this allowed Rommel to enter the village unopposed and created a hole in the Italian defense of Mount Matajur. The Kobarid museum also installed a memorial plaque at the Brgolič farm, where Rommel encamped during the battle.

=== Livek History Trail: The Livek Story ===
In 2019, part of the Italian First World War defensive line above Jevšček underwent maintenance work that involved clearing some of the trenches in the project History Trails in the Soča Valley Local Activity Group Area (Tematske poti na območju LAS Dolina Soče). This included preparing the Livek History Trail: The Livek Story (Slovene: Tematska pot Livek – Livška Štorija) through the trenches toward Jevšček.

The Livek History Trail opened in August 2020.
