= Livške Ravne =

- Location in Slovenia
- Coordinates: 46°11′32.2″N 13°37′22.09″E
- Country: Slovenia
- Traditional region: Slovenian Littoral
- Statistical region: Gorizia
- Municipality: Kobarid

Area
  - Total: 2.47 km^{2} (0.95 sq mi)
- Elevation: 1,068.6 m (3,506 ft)

Population (2002)
  - Total: 21

Livške Ravne (pronounced [ˈliːʍʃkɛ ˈɾáːwnɛ]) is a small settlement above Livek in the Municipality of Kobarid in the Littoral region of Slovenia.
