= Trnovo ob Soči =

- Location in Slovenia
- Coordinates: 46°16′47.19″N 13°33′11.3″E
- Country: Slovenia
- Traditional region: Slovenian Littoral
- Statistical region: Gorizia
- Municipality: Kobarid

Area
  - Total: 10.51 km^{2} (4.06 sq mi)
- Elevation: 318.6 m (1,045 ft)

Population (2002)
  - Total: 143

Trnovo ob Soči (pronounced [təɾˈnɔːʋɔ ɔp ˈsoːtʃi] or [təɾˈnoːʋɔ ɔp ˈsoːtʃi]) is a village on the right bank of the Soča River in the Municipality of Kobarid in the Littoral region of Slovenia.

== Name ==
The name of the settlement was changed from Trnovo to Trnovo ob Soči in 1955.

== Church ==
Holy Trinity Church

The church in the settlement is dedicated to the Holy Trinity. A church at the site was built in 1744, but was destroyed during the First World War. It was rebuilt in 1942. The Baroque altar in the church dates from 1783.
