= Drežnik, Črnomelj =

Drežnik
- Location in Slovenia
- Coordinates: 45°27′50.91″N 15°12′32.15″E
- Country: Slovenia
- Traditional region: White Carniola
- Statistical region: Southeast Slovenia
- Municipality: Črnomelj

Area
  - Total: 1.76 km^{2} (0.68 sq mi)
- Elevation: 176.2 m (578 ft)

Population (2020)
  - Total: 39
  - Density: 22/km^{2} (57/sq mi)
- Postal code: 8344

Drežnik (pronounced [ˈdɾeːʒnik]) is a settlement west of Vinica in the Municipality of Črnomelj in the White Carniola area of southeastern Slovenia. The area is part of the traditional region of Lower Carniola and is now included in the Southeast Slovenia Statistical Region.

== Name ==
Drežnik was first mentioned in written sources in 1485 as Dresnigk. The name is derived from the Slavic word *dręzga 'forest, thicket'. Place names of similar origin include Drežnica and Dresden.
