= Libušnje =

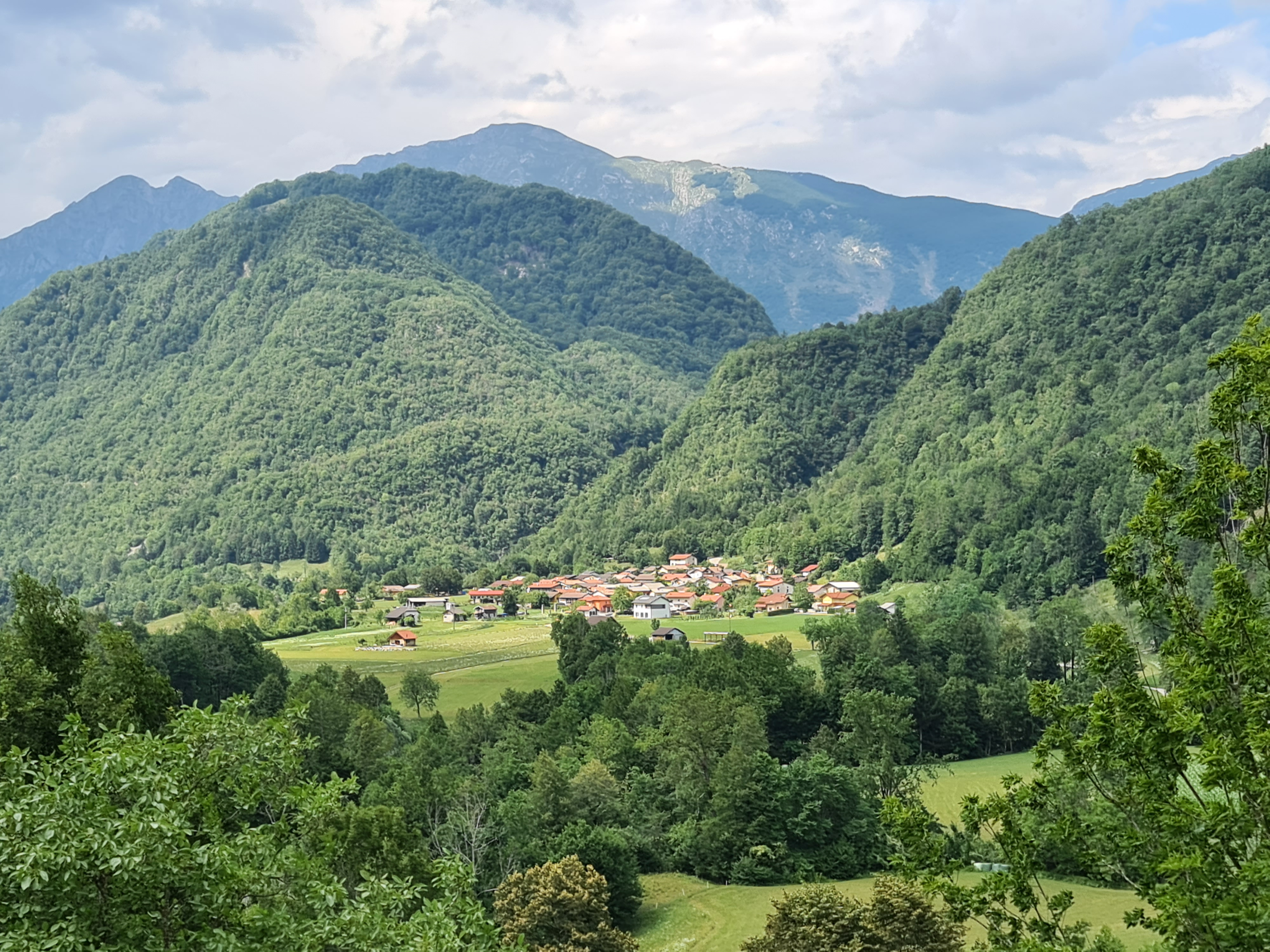

- Location in Slovenia
- Coordinates: 46°13′35.73″N 13°37′32.08″E
- Country: Slovenia
- Traditional region: Slovenian Littoral
- Statistical region: Gorizia
- Municipality: Kobarid
- Elevation: 412.6 m (1,354 ft)

Population (2002)
  - Total: 48

Libušnje (pronounced [liˈbuːʃnjɛ]; Italian: Libussina) is a small village in the Municipality of Kobarid in the Littoral region of Slovenia.

== Churches ==
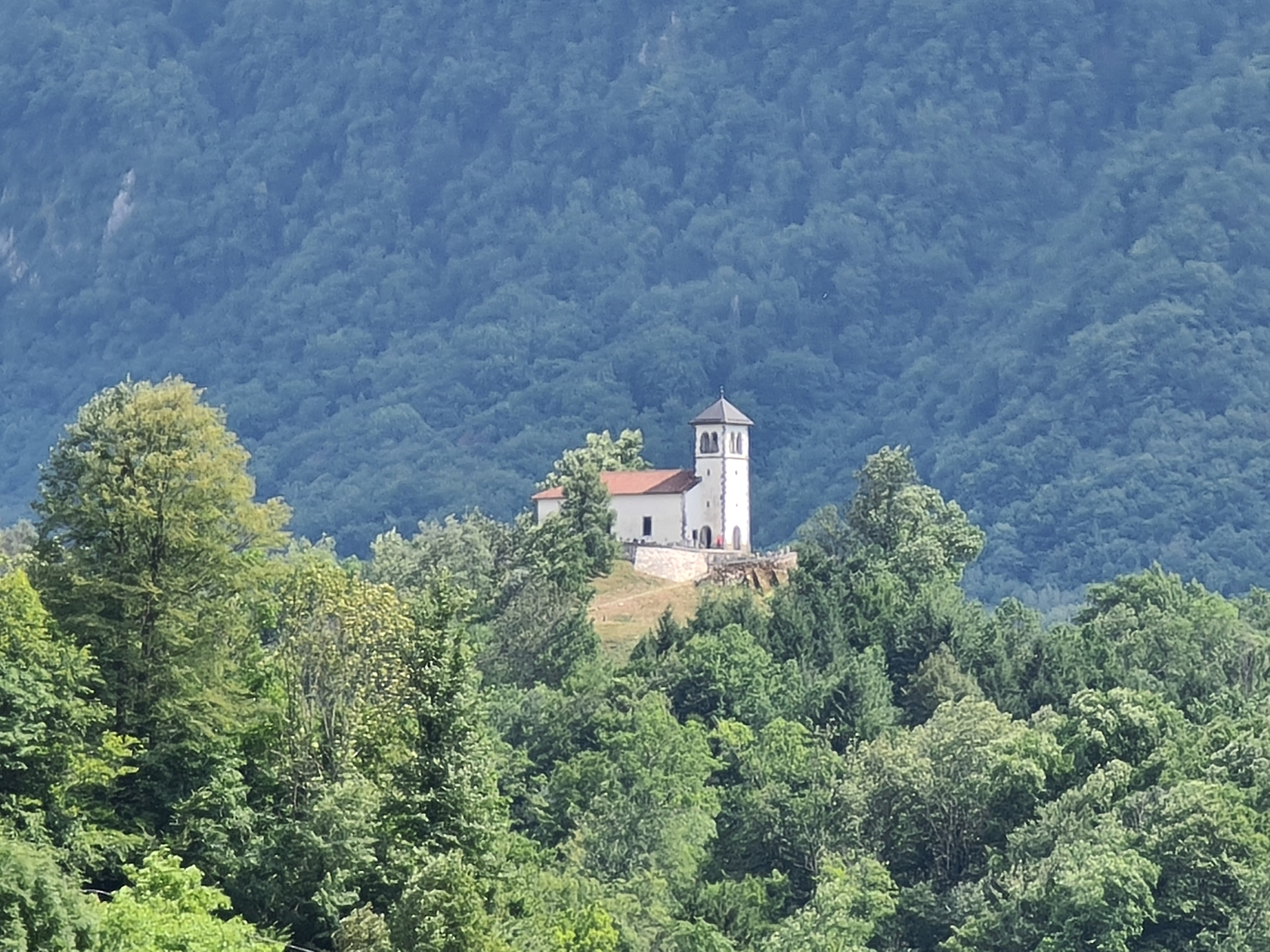
St. Lawrence's Church in Libušnje

The local church, dedicated to the Holy Spirit, was originally built in 1753, and rebuilt in the second half of the 19th century. Its ceiling was painted by Ivan Grohar.

Another local church is built on a small hill outside the village and is dedicated to Saint Lawrence. It is a Baroque church from the mid-18th century. The Slovene poet Simon Gregorčič is buried in the adjacent cemetery.
