= Simon Rutar =

Slovenian historian and geographer (1851–1903)

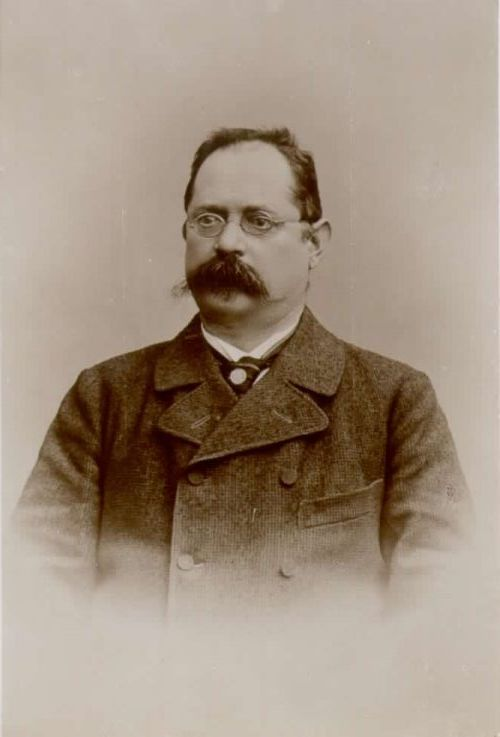
Simon Rutar

Simon Rutar (12 October 1851 – 3 May 1903) was a Slovene historian and geographer. He wrote primarily on the history and geography of the areas that are now part of the Slovenian Littoral, the Italian region of Friuli-Venezia Giulia and the Croatian counties of Istria and Primorsko-Goranska.

== Biography ==
Rutar was born in a peasant family in the Alpine village of Krn near Kobarid, in what was then the Austrian county of Gorizia and Gradisca (now in Slovenia).

He attended the State Secondary School in Gorizia. In 1873 he enrolled at the University of Graz, where he studied history, geography, and philology. In Graz, he was shaped by the contemporary positivist approaches in human sciences. In 1878 he was mobilized in the Austro-Hungarian Army, in a unit sent to occupy Bosnia and Herzegovina. He was demobilized in Autumn 1879 and returned to Graz. The following year he got a job as a high school history teacher in the Dalmatian town of Kotor. In 1882, he moved to Split, where he taught at the local lyceum for the next eight years. There, he met Frane Bulić, a Croatian historian and archeologist who introduced him to the latest trends in archeology.

During his years in Split, Rutar started publishing numerous articles on the local history of his native lands, especially the County of Gorizia. He established close contacts with the Carniolan Rudolfinium Museum, led by the renowned historian and archeologist Karl Deschmann, where he helped as an expert in archeological excavations in the Slovene Lands. In 1889 he settled in Ljubljana, where he was employed as a teacher at the Second State Gymnasium of Ljubljana.

He died on the night of May 3, 1903, when he was caught in a fire that burned down his house. Most of his personal archive was also destroyed in the fire. He was buried in St. Christopher's Cemetery in Ljubljana. In 1936, his tomb was transferred to the monumental Navje cemetery, in which prominent Slovenes are buried.

== Work ==
Rutar was one of the first Slovene historians that employed the new rigorous methods of positivist historical science into his writings. He wrote mostly on the history of political and legal institutions in the Austrian Littoral and Friuli from the feudal age to the late 18th century. He was however also interested in the habits and tradition of the peasant populations regardless their language and ethnicity, although he did concentrate on the two Slavic-speaking peoples in the area, the Slovenes and Croats. In his studies of the peasantry, he took advantage of his knowledge in philology, ethnography, and ethnology.

He clearly rejected the Romantic nationalism of the early Slovene amateur historians, such as Davorin Trstenjak or Janez Trdina, and instead focused on the specifics of local history, his favorite area of inquiry. He wrote important pioneering works on the Slavic settlement of the Eastern Alps, the medieval history in the County of Gorizia and Gradisca and in Friuli. He is also important as a researcher of the medieval legal institutions in his native Tolmin County and the neighbouring Venetian Slovenia. In both cases, he was particularly interested in the institutions of rural municipal self-government, which in those two regions had survived up to the late 18th century.

He also wrote books on the history of Trieste and Istria, which were commissioned by the publishing house Slovenska matica for a wider reading public. In them, Rutar incorporated a wide spectrum of subjects in the presentation of the regions, from geography, philology, and ethnography to geology and demography. He also wrote guidebooks and itineraries of Dalmatia, as well as articles on the most various subjects in history and archeology.

Rutar was also a regular columnist of the two major Slovene literary magazines of the time, Ljubljanski zvon and Dom in svet. In them, he exposed his views on Slovene history. He saw the Slovene Lands not only as a linguistic, cultural, and ethnographic unit, but also a political unit. He insisted on the political and legal continuity between the Slavic principality of Carantania and the Carolingian Duchy of Carinthia, from which all other provinces in Inner Austria developed.

== Personality and views ==
During his lifetime, Rutar was a popular writer. He was known for his simple, vigorous, and direct prose, as well as his predilections for clear statements and stalwart judgements. He did important work in popularizing history among Slovenes.

Differently from most Slovene public figures of the time, Rutar did not partake in any political activity, nor did he publicly profess any specific ideology. He regarded himself as a Slovene and Austrian patriot and clearly rejected Panslavism or any kind of radical nationalism. He did however not enter any polemic with other Slovene authors who held different views, but he did openly criticize Italian irredentism. He collaborated with both Liberal and Conservative Catholic journals and institutions.

Rutar was a close friend of the liberal catholic poet and priest Simon Gregorčič, a native of Vrsno, a village very close to Rutar's native Krn. After Rutar's death, Gregorčič composed a poem in his memory.

Rutar was regarded as a vigorous, straightforward man and a passionate scholar. In the last years of his life, his health worsened and prevented him to carry out his major projects. Much of his work has remained in sketches and the destruction of his personal archive and notes has prevented later scholars from making a definitive assessment of his opus.

== Legacy ==
Rutar has been regarded as one of the first Slovene academic historians. He did not have any disciple to continue his work and was soon overshadowed by his fellow positivist historian Franc Kos. Rutar's studies of specific topics, such as the Slavic settlements in southwest Friuli in the 10th century, were recognized as very important by future historians such as Milko Kos, Ferdo Gestrin, and Bogo Grafenauer. Overall, however, Rutar's influence on Slovenian historiography has been relatively small, with two important exceptions. His views on the legal and political continuity of Carantania in the Carolingian period influenced the historians Josip Mal and later Jožko Šavli, while his study of the rural municipal self-government influenced the work of the renowned Slovenian legal historian Sergij Vilfan.

Rutar's legacy is most strongly felt in his native Goriška region, where several streets, schools, and other public institutions bear his name.

== Essential bibliography ==
- Razmere med Slovenci in Langobardi ("The Relations between the Slovenes and the Lombards", 1875)
- Domoznanstvo poknežene grofije Goriške in Gradiščanske ("Local History of the Princely County of Gorizia and Gradisca", 1882)
- Zgodovina Tolminskega, to je: zgodovinski dogodki sodnijskih okrajev Tolmin, Bolec in Cerkno ž njih prirodoznanskim in statističnim opisom ("The History of the Tolmin County, i.e.: Historical Events in the Judicial Districts of Tolmin, Bolec and Cerkno with a Geographical and Demographic Description", 1882)
- Iz Bara v Podgorico: potopisna črtica ("From Bar to Podgorica: A Travelogue", 1891)
- Poknežena grofija Goriška in Gradiščanska ("The Princely County of Gorizia and Gradisca", 1892)
- Guida di Spalato e Salona ("Guide to Split and Solin", with Frane Bulić, 1894)
- Samosvoje mesto Trst in mejna grofija Istra ("The Self-Governing City of Trieste and the Margravate of Istria", 1896–97)
- Beneška Slovenija: prirodoznanski in zgodovinski opis ("Venetian Slovenia: A Geographical and Historical Description", with Peter Podreka, 1899)
- Römische Strassen und Befestigungen in Krain ("Roman Roads and Fortifications in Carniola", with Anton von Premerstein, 1899)
- Dnevnik: 1869-1874 ("Personal Diary from 1869 to 1874", edited by Branko Marušič in 1974)

== Sources ==
- Bogo Grafenauer, Struktura in tehnika zgodovinske vede (Ljubljana: Philosophy faculty of the University of Ljubljana, 1980), 222-223.
- Branko Marušič, "Simon Rutar: življenje in delo" in Simon Rutar, Zgodovinske črtice iz poknežene grofije goriško-gradiščanske (Nova Gorica: Založba Branko - Založništvo Jutro, 2001).
- Boža Pleničar, "Bibliografija Simona Rutarja", in Goriški letnik 4/5 (1977–1978).
- Branko Marušič, ed., Simon Rutar, Dnevnik (1869–1874) (Trieste - Nova Gorica, 1972).
