= Mlinsko =

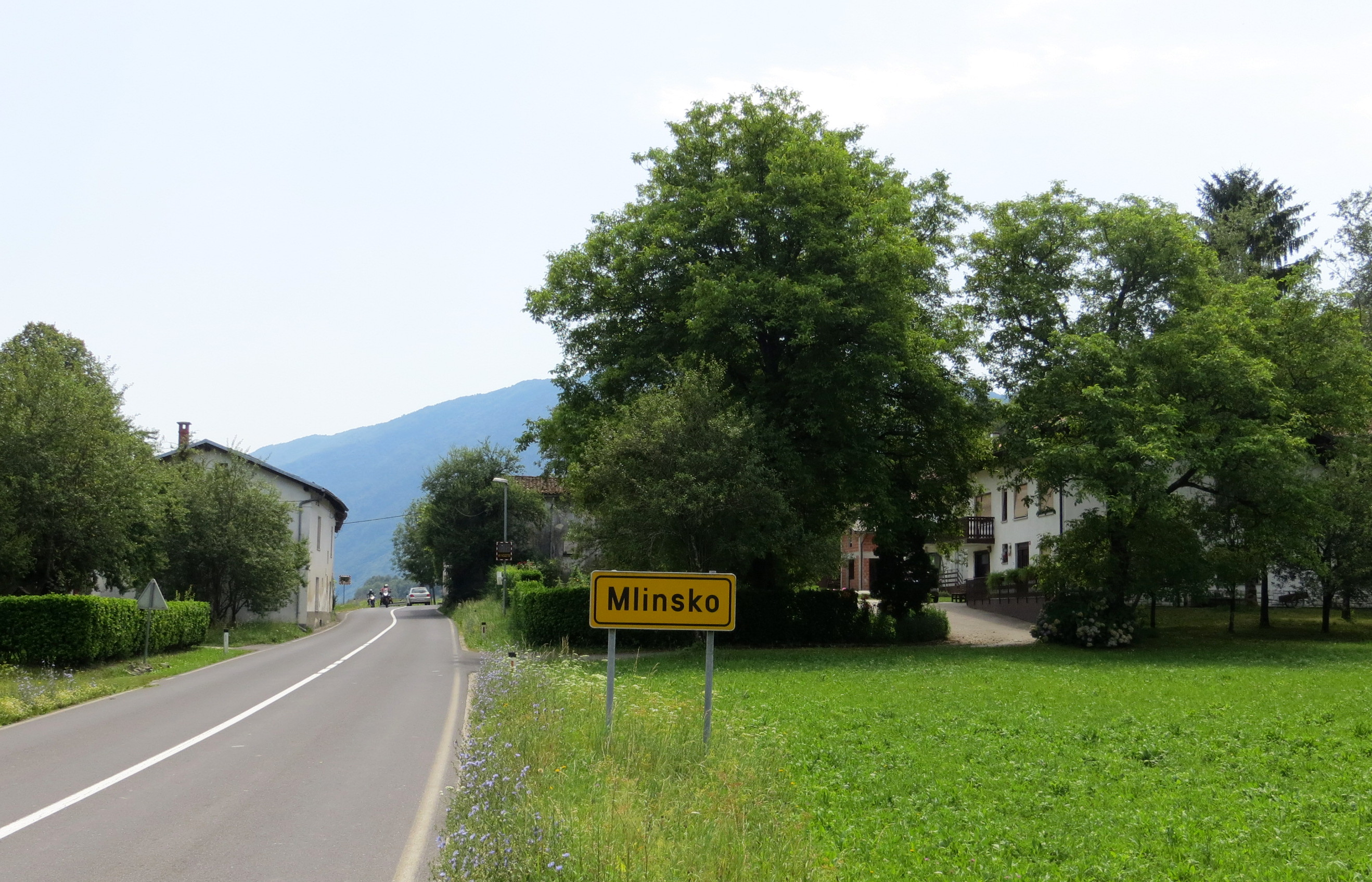

- Location in Slovenia
- Coordinates: 46°14′12.52″N 13°37′7.86″E
- Country: Slovenia
- Traditional region: Slovenian Littoral
- Statistical region: Gorizia
- Municipality: Kobarid

Area
  - Total: 0.92 km^{2} (0.36 sq mi)
- Elevation: 216.2 m (709 ft)

Population (2002)
  - Total: 73

Mlinsko (pronounced [ˈmliːnskɔ]) is a small settlement on the right bank of the Soča River just outside Kobarid in the Littoral region of Slovenia.
