= Idrsko =

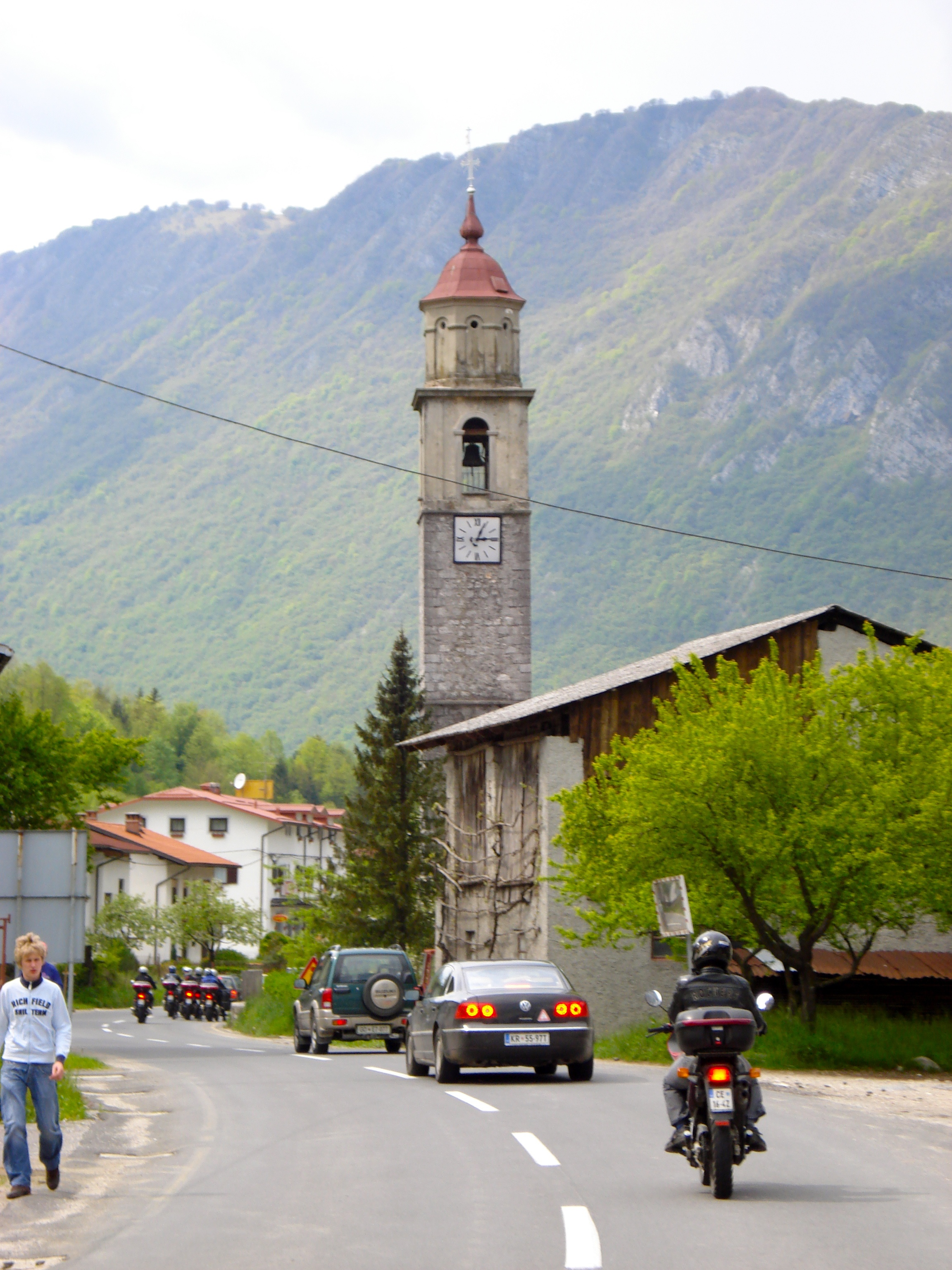

- Location in Slovenia
- Coordinates: 46°13′49.11″N 13°35′27.13″E
- Country: Slovenia
- Traditional region: Slovenian Littoral
- Statistical region: Gorizia
- Municipality: Kobarid

Area
  - Total: 10.3 km^{2} (4.0 sq mi)
- Elevation: 219.7 m (721 ft)

Population (2002)
  - Total: 355

Idrsko (pronounced [ˈiːdəɾskɔ]) is a settlement on the right bank of the Soča River in the Municipality of Kobarid in the Littoral region of Slovenia.

== Geography ==
The northern limits of Idrsko are bounded by Mlinšček Creek to the northwest and Idrija Creek, a right tributary of the Soča River, to the northeast. Two more right tributaries of the Soča River flow south of Idrsko: Potočec Creek (a.k.a. Drganjšček Creek) passes along the southern outskirts of the village, and Kokošnjak Creek follows a parallel course about 500 meters (1,600 ft) further south.

== Church ==
The local church is dedicated to Saint Thomas and was built in 1765. The belfry was added in 1861. There was extensive damage to the village in the 1976 Friuli earthquake.
