= Staro Selo, Kobarid =

Staro Selo
- Village
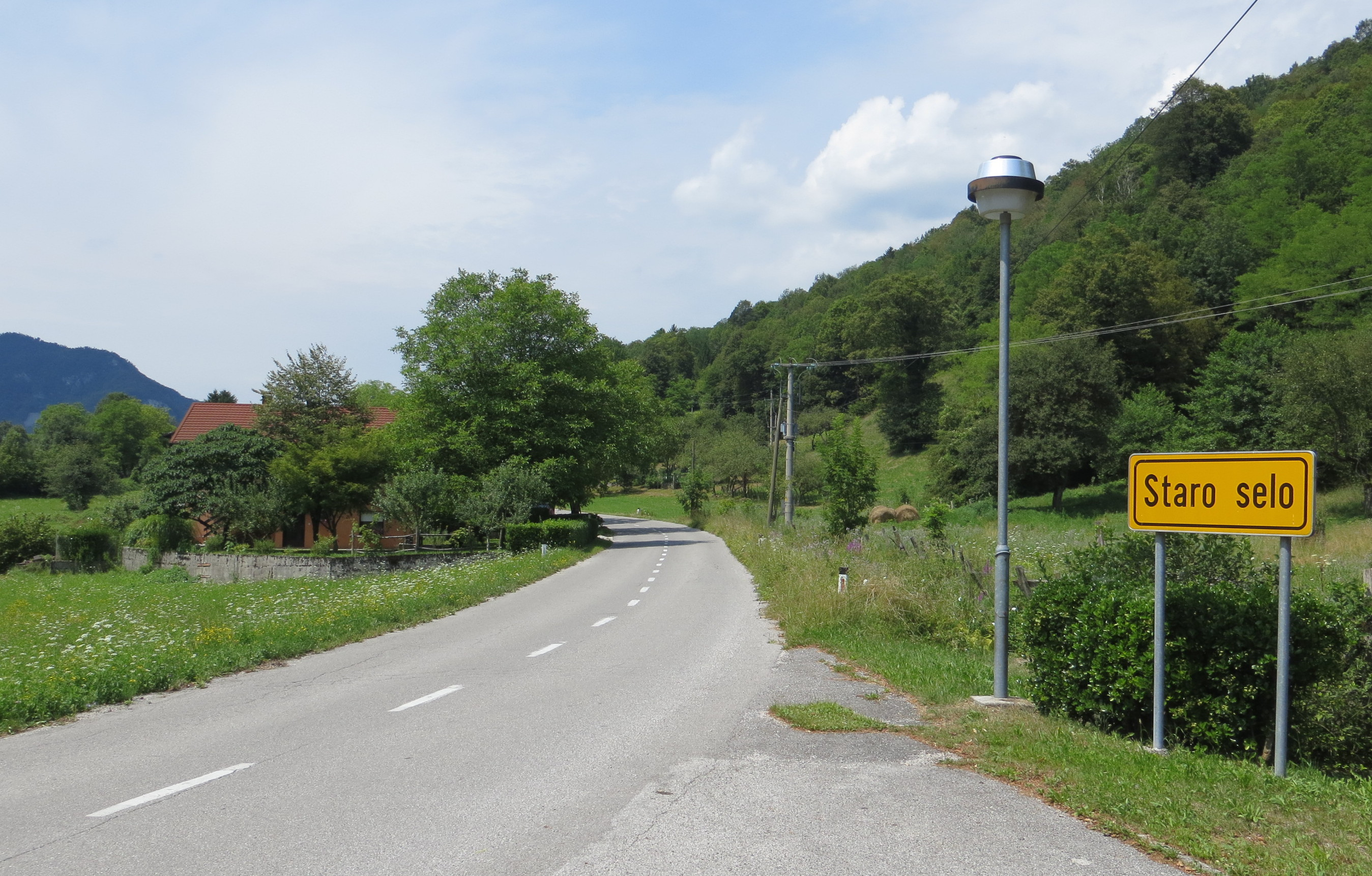

- Location in Slovenia
- Coordinates: 46°14′45.35″N 13°31′51.4″E
- Country: Slovenia
- Traditional region: Slovenian Littoral
- Statistical region: Gorizia
- Municipality: Kobarid

Area
  - Total: 6.5 km^{2} (2.5 sq mi)
- Elevation: 246 m (807 ft)

Population (2002)
  - Total: 153

Staro Selo (pronounced [ˈstaːɾɔ ˈsɛːlɔ]; Slovene: Staro selo) is a village in the Municipality of Kobarid in the Littoral region of Slovenia.

== Church ==
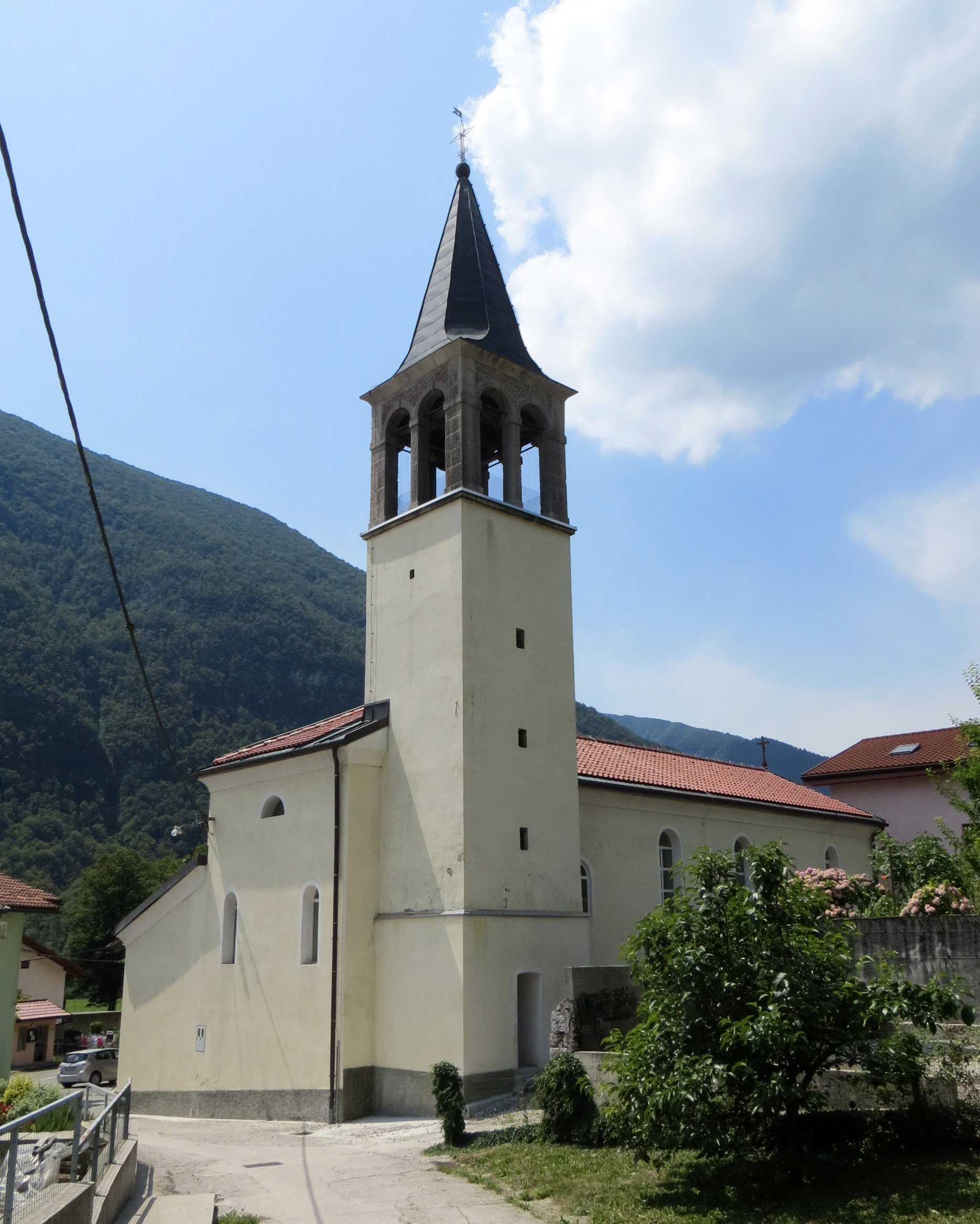
Saint Leonard's Church

The church in the centre of the settlement is dedicated to Saint Leonard.

== Gallery ==
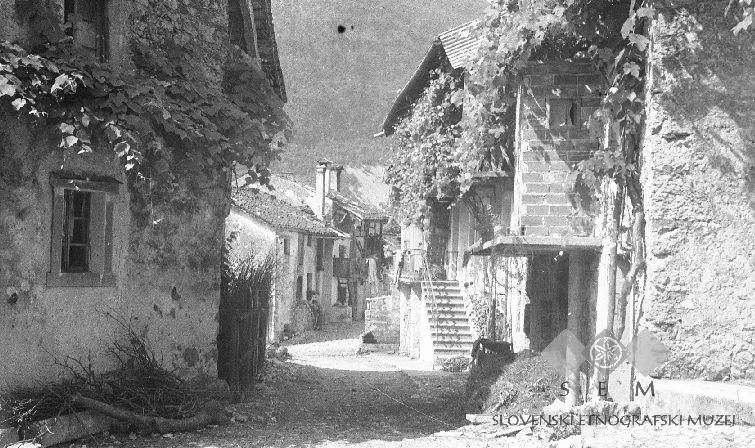
Staro Selo in 1951
