= Sužid =

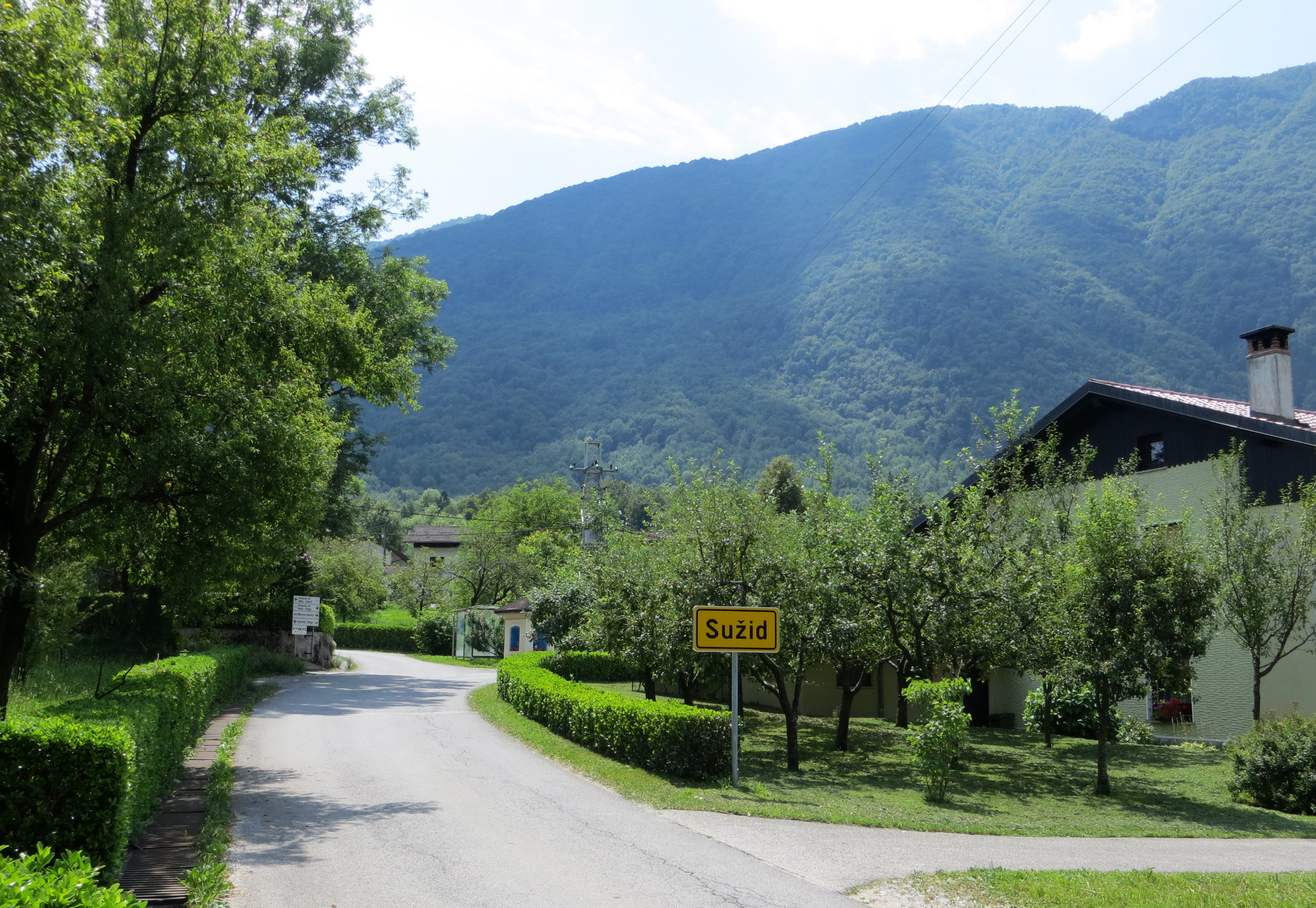

- Location in Slovenia
- Coordinates: 46°14′30.76″N 13°33′6.48″E
- Country: Slovenia
- Traditional region: Slovenian Littoral
- Statistical region: Gorizia
- Municipality: Kobarid

Area
  - Total: 5.83 km^{2} (2.25 sq mi)
- Elevation: 249.7 m (819 ft)

Population (2002)
  - Total: 129

Sužid (pronounced [suˈʒiːt]) is a village near Kobarid in the Littoral region of Slovenia.

== Church ==
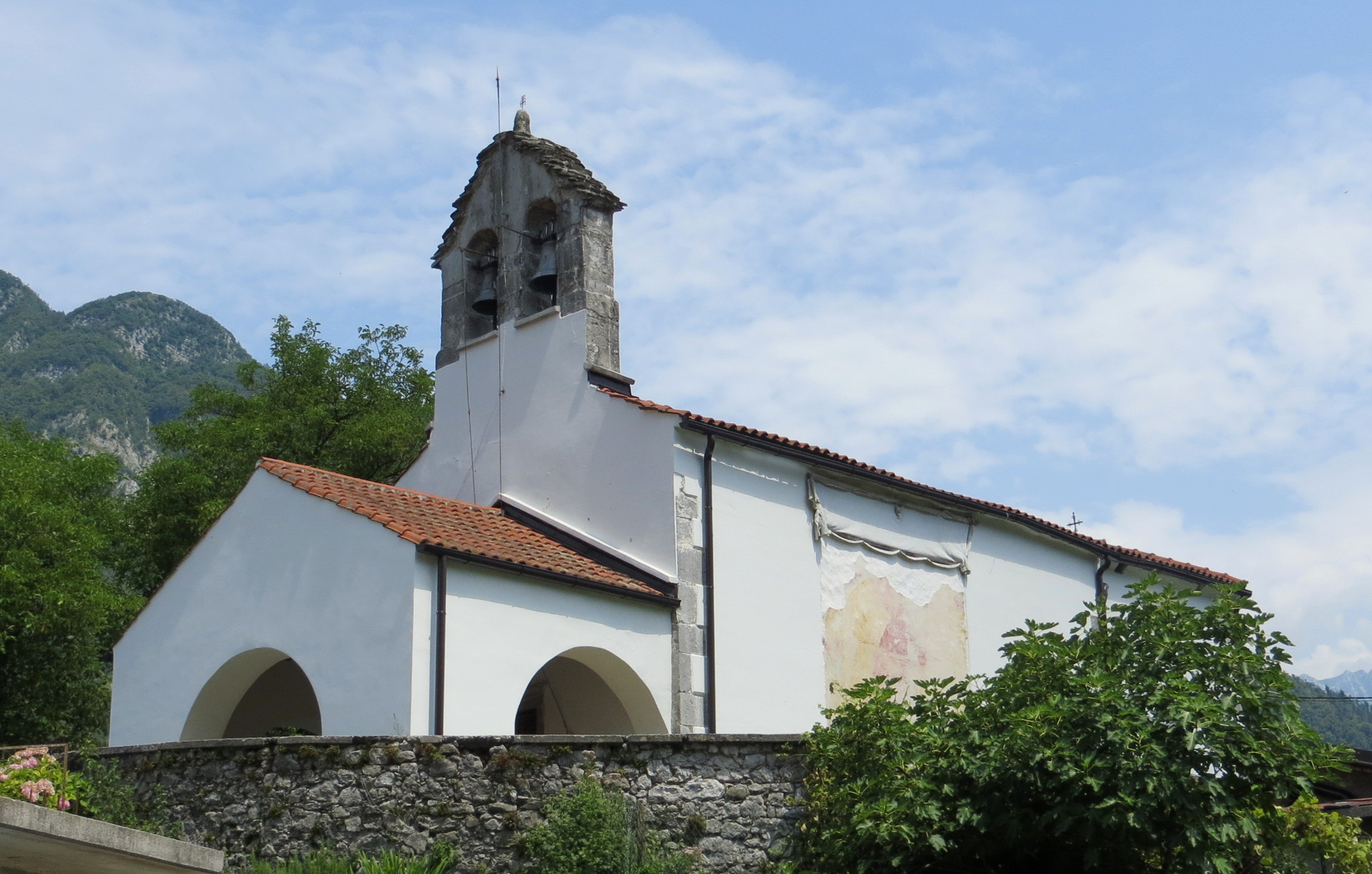
Three Kings Church

The church in the village is dedicated to the Three Kings. It dates from the end of the 15th century and contains a statue of Saint Martin from the 16th century. The fresco on the rear wall of the church dates from the 17th century. The chancel was richly painted in the 17th century.
