= Smast =

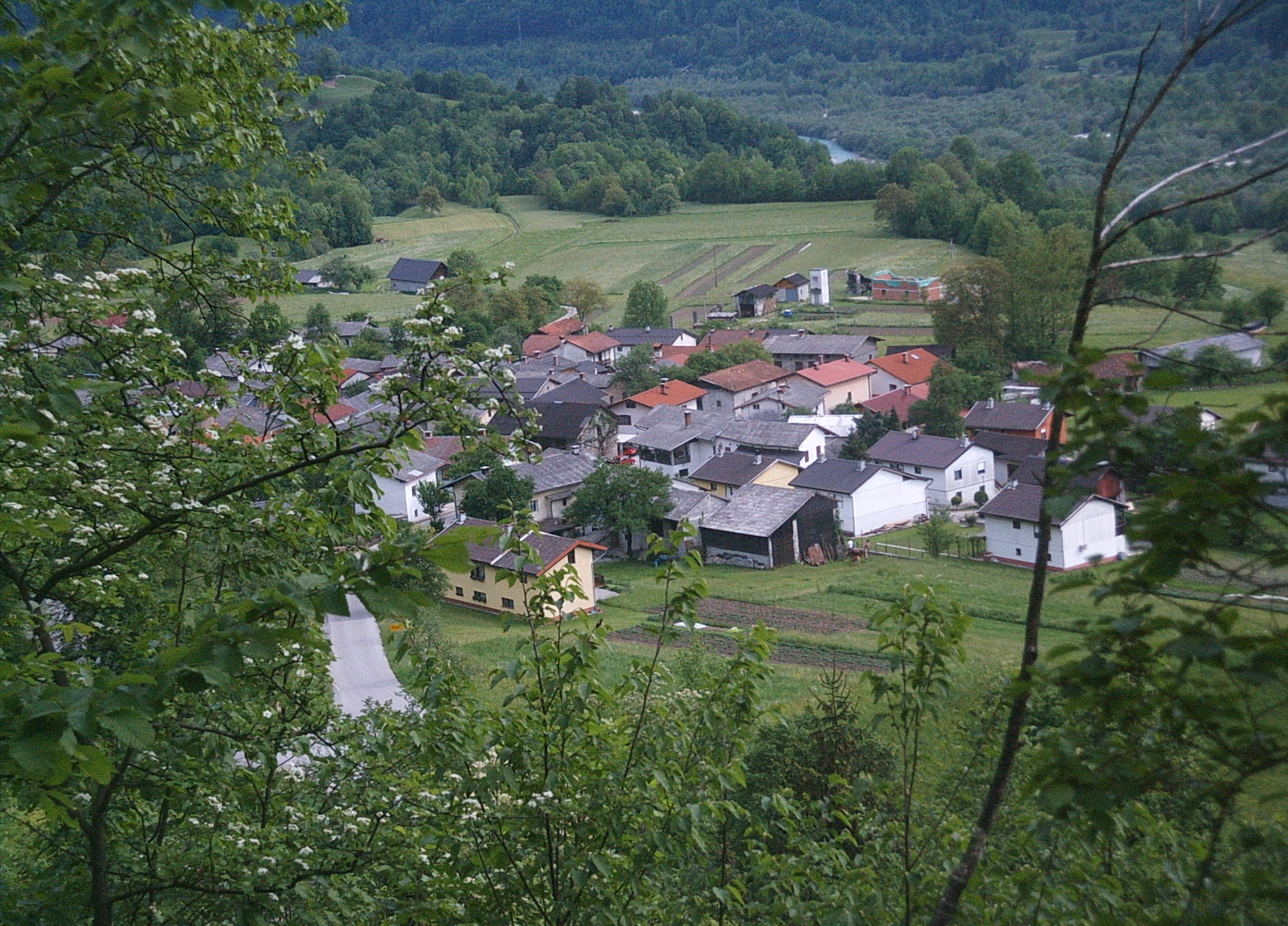

- Location in Slovenia
- Coordinates: 46°14′2.47″N 13°36′53.14″E
- Country: Slovenia
- Traditional region: Slovenian Littoral
- Statistical region: Gorizia
- Municipality: Kobarid

Area
  - Total: 2.6 km^{2} (1.0 sq mi)
- Elevation: 243.9 m (800 ft)

Population (2002)
  - Total: 177

Smast (pronounced [ˈsmaːst]) is a village on the left bank of the Soča River in the Municipality of Kobarid in the Littoral region of Slovenia.
