= Ladra =

- Village
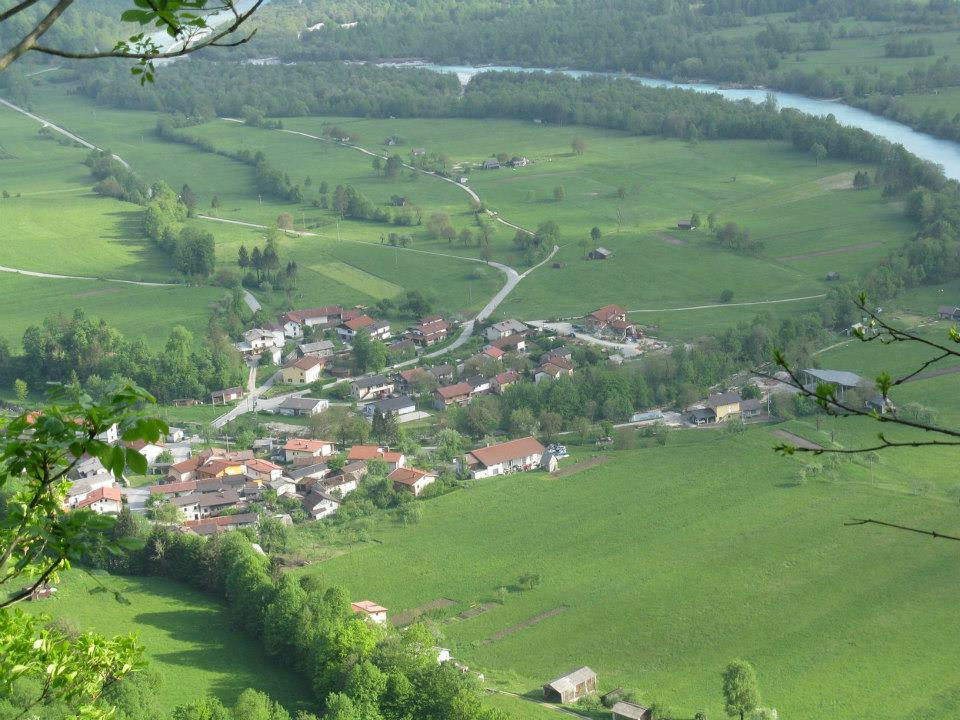

- Location in Slovenia
- Coordinates: 46°14′18.88″N 13°36′17.25″E
- Country: Slovenia
- Traditional region: Slovenian Littoral
- Statistical region: Gorizia
- Municipality: Kobarid

Area
  - Total: 3.49 km^{2} (1.35 sq mi)
- Elevation: 206.7 m (678 ft)

Population (2002)
  - Total: 150
  - Density: 43/km^{2} (110/sq mi)

Ladra (pronounced [ˈlaːdɾa]) is a village on the left bank of the Soča River near Kobarid in the Littoral region of Slovenia.
