= Vrsno, Croatia =

Settlement in Šibenik-Knin County, Croatia

Vrsno
- Settlement
- Interactive map of Vrsno
- Location of Vrsno in Croatia
- Coordinates: 43°37′44″N 16°03′04″E
- Country: Croatia
- County: Šibenik-Knin
- City: Šibenik

Area
  - Total: 10.3 km^{2} (4.0 sq mi)

Population (2021)
  - Total: 58
  - Density: 5.6/km^{2} (15/sq mi)
- Time zone: UTC+1 (CET)
  - Summer (DST): UTC+2 (CEST)
- Postal code: 22000 Šibenik
- Area code: +385 (0)22

Vrsno is a settlement in the City of Šibenik in Croatia. In 2021, its population was 58.

== Demographics ==
Vrsno: Population trends 1857–2021
v

population			171	197	202	237	208	302	322	369	443	412	294	177	111	67	58
	1857	1869	1880	1890	1900	1910	1921	1931	1948	1953	1961	1971	1981	1991	2001	2011	2021

Sources: Croatian Bureau of Statistics publications
