= Jezerca =

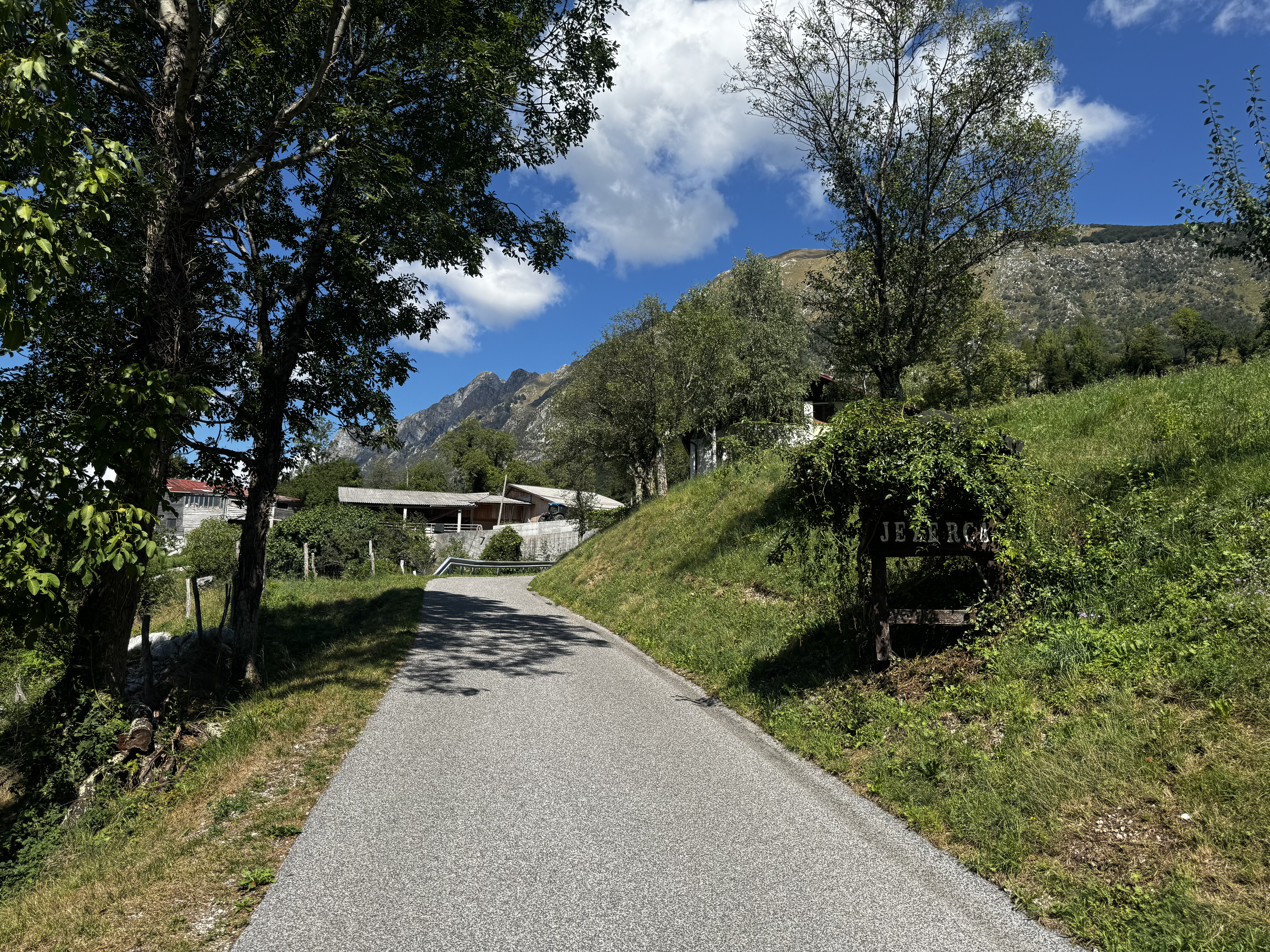

- Location in Slovenia
- Coordinates: 46°15′54.4″N 13°36′14.36″E
- Country: Slovenia
- Traditional region: Slovenian Littoral
- Statistical region: Gorizia
- Municipality: Kobarid

Area
  - Total: 1.31 km^{2} (0.51 sq mi)
- Elevation: 529.2 m (1,736 ft)

Population (2002)
  - Total: 26

Jezerca (pronounced [jɛˈzeːɾtsa]; Italian: Geserza) is a small settlement above the town of Kobarid in the Littoral region of Slovenia.
