= Livek =

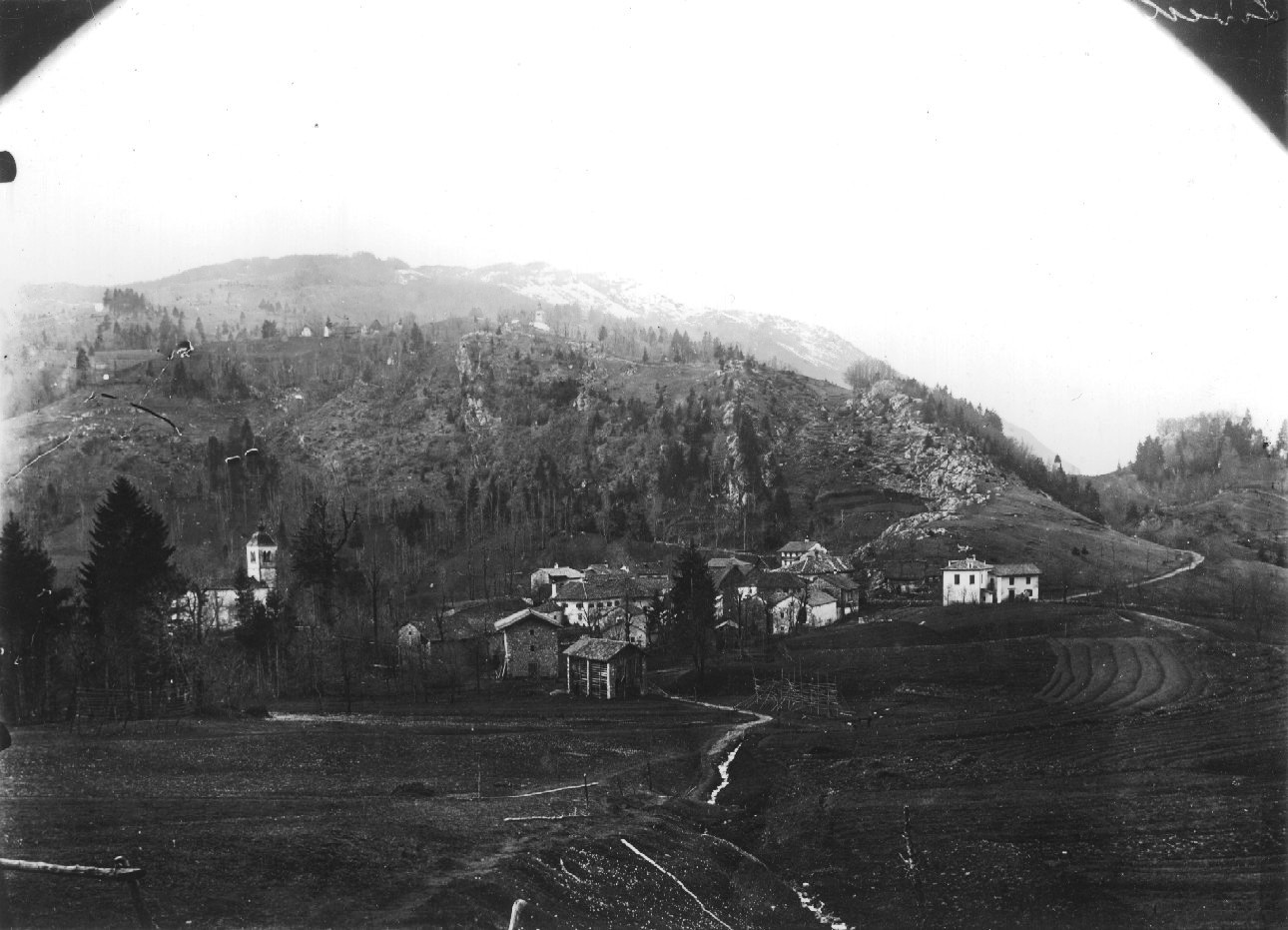

- Location in Slovenia
- Coordinates: 46°12′10.7″N 13°35′58.1″E
- Country: Slovenia
- Traditional region: Slovenian Littoral
- Statistical region: Gorizia
- Municipality: Kobarid

Area
  - Total: 3.03 km^{2} (1.17 sq mi)
- Elevation: 693.7 m (2,276 ft)

Population (2002)
  - Total: 146

Livek (pronounced [ˈliːʋək]; Italian: Luico) is a village in the Municipality of Kobarid in the Littoral region of Slovenia. It is located on the border with Italy, under Mount Matajur and the Kolovrat mountain range, which separates the Italian region of Friuli from the Upper Soča Valley.

The parish church in the center of the village is dedicated to Saint James.

== History ==
Alpine Slavs, ancestors of the present-day Slovenes, settled the area in the 7th century. In the Middle Ages, the villages belonged to the Lombard Kingdom, the Frankish Empire, and finally to the Patriarchate of Aquileia. Between 1420 and 1797, Livek belonged to the Republic of Venice and was part of the historical region known as Venetian Slovenia.

In 1797, it was acquired by the Habsburg monarchy. Already in 1805, it was included in the Napoleonic Kingdom of Italy. In 1813 it was regained by the Austrians. Although the vast majority of the region of Venetian Slovenia was included in Austrian Lombardy-Venetia, Livek was placed in the administrative region known as the Kingdom of Illyria. In 1849, it became part of the Austrian Littoral. In 1866, when the Veneto and Friuli regions were acquired by Italy, Livek remained in the Austrian Empire, becoming a border village.

Livek became known during World War I, when it became an important strategic location during the Battle of Caporetto towards the end of 1917. A unit of the German Army commanded by Erwin Rommel, who later became a German Field Marshal in World War II, seized the village and used it as a base from where they took the strategically crucial Mount Matajur. Rommel's small unit managed to defeat the Italian defense that numbered 150 officers, 9,000 men, and 81 pieces of artillery. He received Prussia's highest medal, the Pour le Mérite, for this act and described it and his route to Matajur via Livek in his 1937 book Infanterie greift an (Infantry Attacks).
