= Avsa, Kobarid =

Avsa
- Location in Slovenia
- Coordinates: 46°11′56.64″N 13°35′20.86″E
- Country: Slovenia
- Traditional region: Slovenian Littoral
- Statistical region: Gorizia
- Municipality: Kobarid

Area
  - Total: 4.32 km^{2} (1.67 sq mi)
- Elevation: 821.5 m (2,695 ft)

Population (2002)
  - Total: 37

Avsa (pronounced [ˈaːu̯sa]) is a small village in the Municipality of Kobarid in the Littoral region of Slovenia, close to the border with Italy.
