= Krn (settlement) =

- Location in Slovenia
- Coordinates: 46°13′56.21″N 13°39′54.86″E
- Country: Slovenia
- Traditional region: Slovenian Littoral
- Statistical region: Gorizia
- Municipality: Kobarid

Area
  - Total: 25.73 km^{2} (9.93 sq mi)
- Elevation: 854.9 m (2,805 ft)

Population (2002)
  - Total: 38

Krn (pronounced [ˈkəɾn]) is a small village below Mount Krn in the Municipality of Kobarid in the Littoral region of Slovenia (northwestern Slovenia).

== Notable people ==
Notable people that were born or lived in Krn include:

- Simon Rutar (1851–1903), historian
