= Simon Gregorčič =

Slovene poet

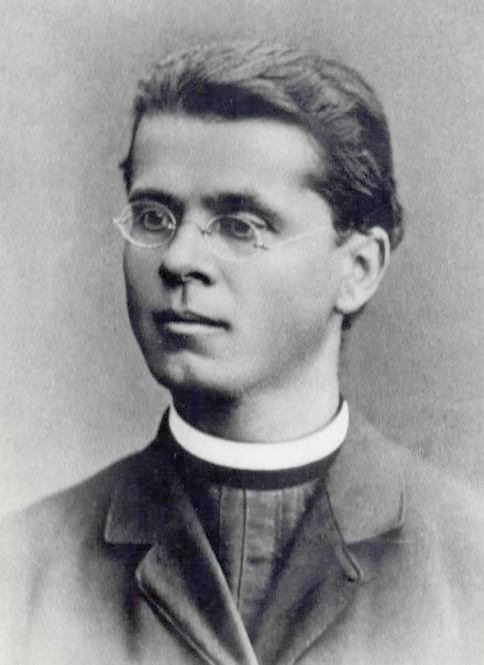
- Born: October 15, 1844; Vrsno, Austrian Littoral, Austrian Empire
- Died: November 24, 1906 (aged 62); Gorizia, Austria-Hungary
- Education: Gorizia seminary
- Occupation: poet
- Writing career
- Subjects: patriotic and love poems

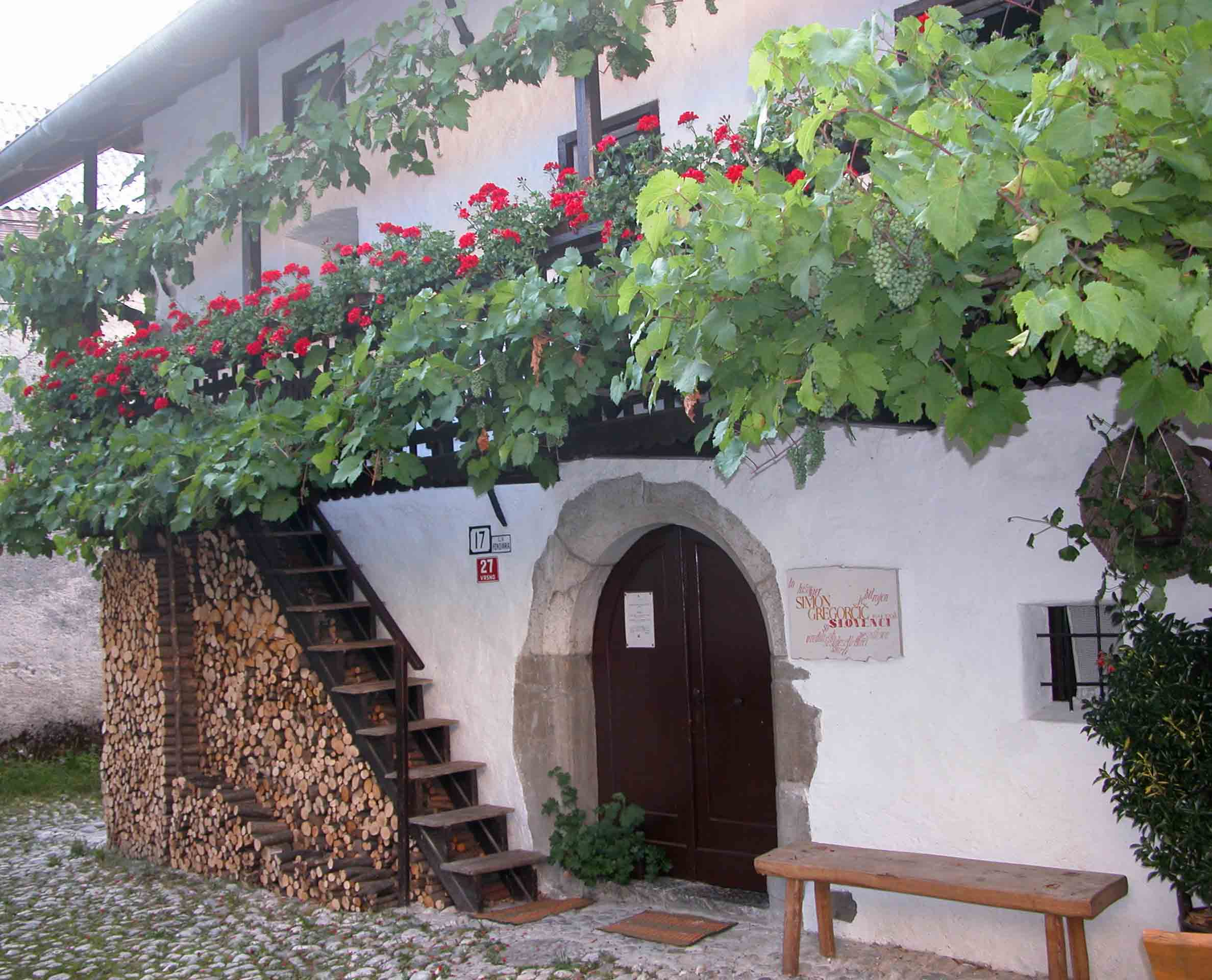
The house in which Simon Gregorčič was born

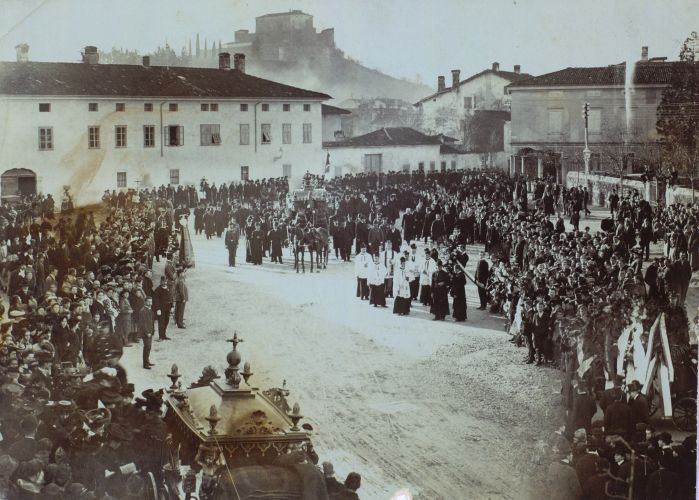
Gregorčič's funeral in Gorizia

Simon Gregorčič (15 October 1844 – 24 November 1906) was a Slovene poet and Roman Catholic priest. He is considered the first lyric poet of the Slovene realist poetry and the most melodical Slovene poet.

== Biography ==
Gregorčič (October 15, 1844 – November 24, 1906) was born in the small mountain village of Vrsno, perched above the Soča river in the Austrian Empire's County of Gorizia and Gradisca. He was the second son of Jernej Gregorčič and Katarina (née Gaberšček), both from smallholder-peasant families. He had seven siblings. In 1851, he began attending primary school in Libušnje, and was sent to school in Gorizia in 1852. After finishing high school there, he entered the local seminary. He was ordained on October 27, 1867, and became a vicar in Kobarid in September 1868.

Gregorčič had already taken an interest in iterarure; in 1871, he founded a public reading room in Kobarid with the financial support of his friend and patron Dr. Ignacij Gruntar, who had funded the publication of his first poetry collection. In 1872, Dragojila Milek came to Kobarid as a teacher. A fellow poet, she also came to lead the local choir, and became the librarian of the reading room. Gregorčič's open affection for Milek led to his transfer from Kobarid in the spring of 1873. His romantic experience had a great effect on his subsequent output.

In 1873, Gregorčič was transferred to Rihemberk in the Vipava Valley. He was transferred several more times before retiring in 1903, when he moved to a Gorizia apartment where he died on November 24, 1906.

== Work ==
As a student he began writing lyrical poetry which was published in many literary magazines (Slovenski glasnik, Zgodnja Danica, Zvon, Ljubljanski zvon). It is apparent from his work that he was inspired by Romantic poetic forms. Mostly he was writing love, patriotic, life narrative poems and even some epic poems.

His poems, such as the ode "Soči" ("To the Soča"), were patriotic in nature, but he also wrote love poems, such as Kropiti te ne smem ("I am not allowed to bless you"), and worked in other poetic genres. His most important works were Človeka nikar, Ujetega ptiča tožba ("The Snared Bird's Lament"), Moj črni plašč, Veseli pastir, Nazaj v planinski raj, Oljki.

He succeeded with his first collection Prvi zvezek Poezij (1882) and after six years he released his second collection Drugi zvezek Poezij (1888). In 1902 his third collection Tretji zvezek Poezij came out and then after his death the fourth collection Četrti zvezek Poezij (1908) was released.

Slovene composer Breda Šček set Gregorčič's texts to music.

Anka Salmič (1902–1969), Slovenian farmer, folk healer and poet, was particularly fond of Simon Gregorčič’s poetry, so at home they sometimes even called her Simon Gregorčič.

Influences: Petrarca, Vodnik, Stritar, Prešeren.

== Bibliography ==
- Poezije I (1882)
- Poezije II (1888)
- Poezije III (1902)
- Poezije IV (1908) - published after his death
- Izbrano delo I-IV (1947–1951)

== See also ==
- Anton Aškerc
- Simon Rutar
- Slovene literature
