= Magozd =

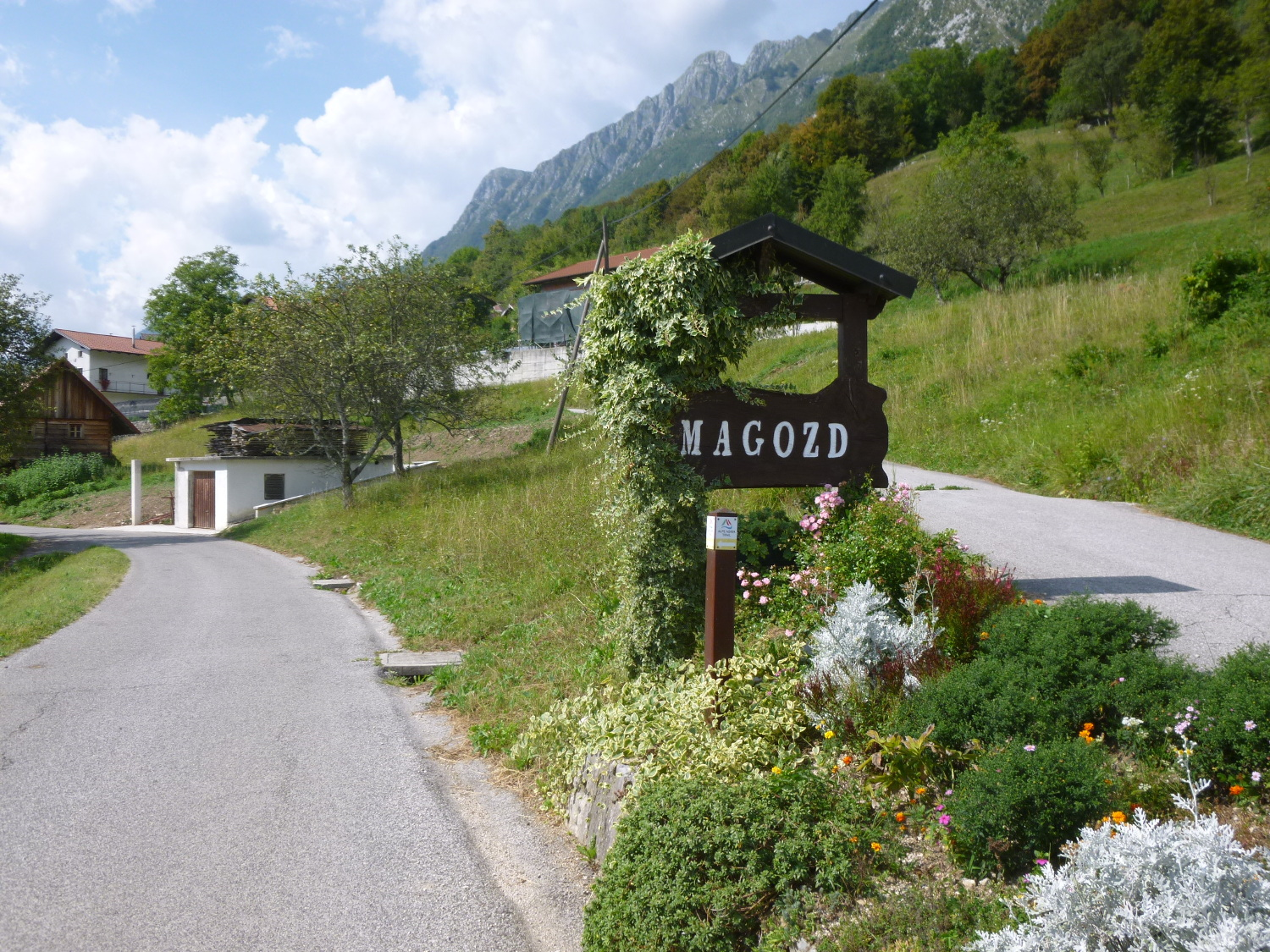

- Location in Slovenia
- Coordinates: 46°16′11.05″N 13°35′32.37″E
- Country: Slovenia
- Traditional region: Slovenian Littoral
- Statistical region: Gorizia
- Municipality: Kobarid

Area
  - Total: 11.16 km^{2} (4.31 sq mi)
- Elevation: 463.4 m (1,520 ft)

Population (2002)
  - Total: 62

Magozd (pronounced [ˈmaːɡɔst]; Italian: Magosti) is a settlement in the Municipality of Kobarid in the Littoral region of Slovenia.

== Name ==
The village was attested in written sources in 1409 as Namabisgonden, circa 1439 as Na mali gosden, and in 1763–87 as Magost zu Dresenze. The name is derived from *Mal(i) gozd (literally, 'little woods'), via *Mau̯ gozd, with syncope of the second syllable.

== Church ==
A small church dedicated to Saint Anne can be found just outside the village. It was built in the late 15th century and the belfry was added in the 17th century. It also has a 17th-century wooden altar.
