= Drežniške Ravne =

- Location in Slovenia
- Coordinates: 46°16′8.15″N 13°36′26.62″E
- Country: Slovenia
- Traditional region: Slovenian Littoral
- Statistical region: Gorizia
- Municipality: Kobarid

Area
  - Total: 15.9 km^{2} (6.1 sq mi)
- Elevation: 569.7 m (1,869 ft)

Population (2002)
  - Total: 153

Drežniške Ravne (pronounced [ˈdɾeːʒniʃkɛ ˈɾáːwnɛ]; Italian: Raune di Dersenza) is a settlement in the Municipality of Kobarid in the Littoral region of Slovenia.

The local church is dedicated to Saint Matthew and dates to 1511. The church itself with some of its furnishings was damaged in an earthquake in 1998, but this also revealed traces of late Gothic frescos on the walls.
