= Ivo Urbančič =

- Born: Ivan Urbančič; 12 November 1930; Robič, Kingdom of Italy (now in Slovenia)
- Died: 7 August 2016 (aged 85)

Philosophical work
- Era: 20th-/21st-century philosophy
- Region: Western Philosophy
- School: Phenomenology
- Main interests: Ontology · Ethics · Technology · Systems theory

Ivo Urbančič (pronounced [ˈíːʋɔ uɾˈbáːntʃitʃ]; 12 November 1930 – 7 August 2016) was a Slovenian philosopher. He is considered by many to be one of the fathers of the phenomenological school in Slovenia.

== Biography ==
He was born Ivan Urbančič in Robič near Kobarid, in what was then the Italian administrative region of Julian March to a peasant Slovene family. His family left the region when he was a child to escape Fascist persecution and moved to the Kingdom of Yugoslavia.

Urbančič's family spent six years in the village of Bistrica in southwest Vardar Macedonia, where a colony of Slovene immigrants from the Julian March was established. In 1937, they moved to Slovenia, to the village of Črešnjevec near Slovenska Bistrica, where young Ivo met with Jože Pučnik, with whom he established a lifelong friendship.

After finishing the technical high school in Kranj, he attended a one-year course in communication technology in Belgrade. In 1960, Pučnik convinced him to enroll in the University of Ljubljana, where he studied philosophy. While a student, he became involved with a group of young intellectuals, known as the "Critical generation". In 1970, he obtained his PhD at the University of Zagreb. Between 1969 and 1970, he studied at the University of Vienna, and between 1971 and 1972 in Cologne where he worked with the philosopher Karl-Heinz Volkmann-Schluck. In 1964, he became a researcher at the Institute for Sociology and Philosophy at the University of Ljubljana.

In the late 1980s, he worked as an editor at the publishing house Slovenska matica, where he supervised the translation and first edition of many major Western thinkers in Slovene. Among others, he was instrumental in the publishing of the complete works of Nietzsche. In the early 1980s, he was one of the co-founders of the alternative review Nova revija. In 1987, he was among the authors of the Contributions to the Slovenian National Program, an intellectual manifesto demanding a democratic, pluralistic and independent Slovenia. In 1989. he was among the co-founders of the Slovenian Democratic Union, one of the first democratic political parties opposing the Communist regime in Slovenia.

Urbančič died in Ljubljana in 2016, aged 85.

== Work ==
Urbančič was one of the first who introduced the thought of Heidegger to Slovenia. He also wrote several monographies on Nietzsche. Urbančič wrote several works on the history of philosophy in the Slovene Lands.

== Selected works ==
- Evropski nihilizem ("The European Nihilism". Ljubljana, 1971);
- Leninova "filozofija" ("Lenin's "Philosophy"". Maribor, 1971);
- Vprašanje umetnosti in estetike na prelomu sodobne epohe: estetska in filozofska misel Dušana Pirjevca ("The Question of Art and Esthetics at the Turning Point of Our Epoch: the Esthetic and Philosophic Thought of Dušan Pirjevec". Ljubljana: 1980);
- Uvod v vprašanje naroda ("Introduction on the Question of Nation". Maribor, 1981);
- Neosholastika na Slovenskem ("Neoscholasticism in the Slovene Lands". Ljubljana, 1983);
- Zaratustrovo izročilo I & II ("Zarathursta's Legacy I & II". Ljubljana, 1993 & 1996);
- Moč in oblast ("Power and Authority". Ljubljana, 2000);
- Nevarnost biti ("The Danger of Being". Ljubljana, 2003);
- Zgodovina nihilizma ("The History of Nihilism". Ljubljana, 2011).
- Povijest nihilizma ("The History of Nihilism". Zagreb, 2019).
