= Vrsno, Kobarid =

Vrsno
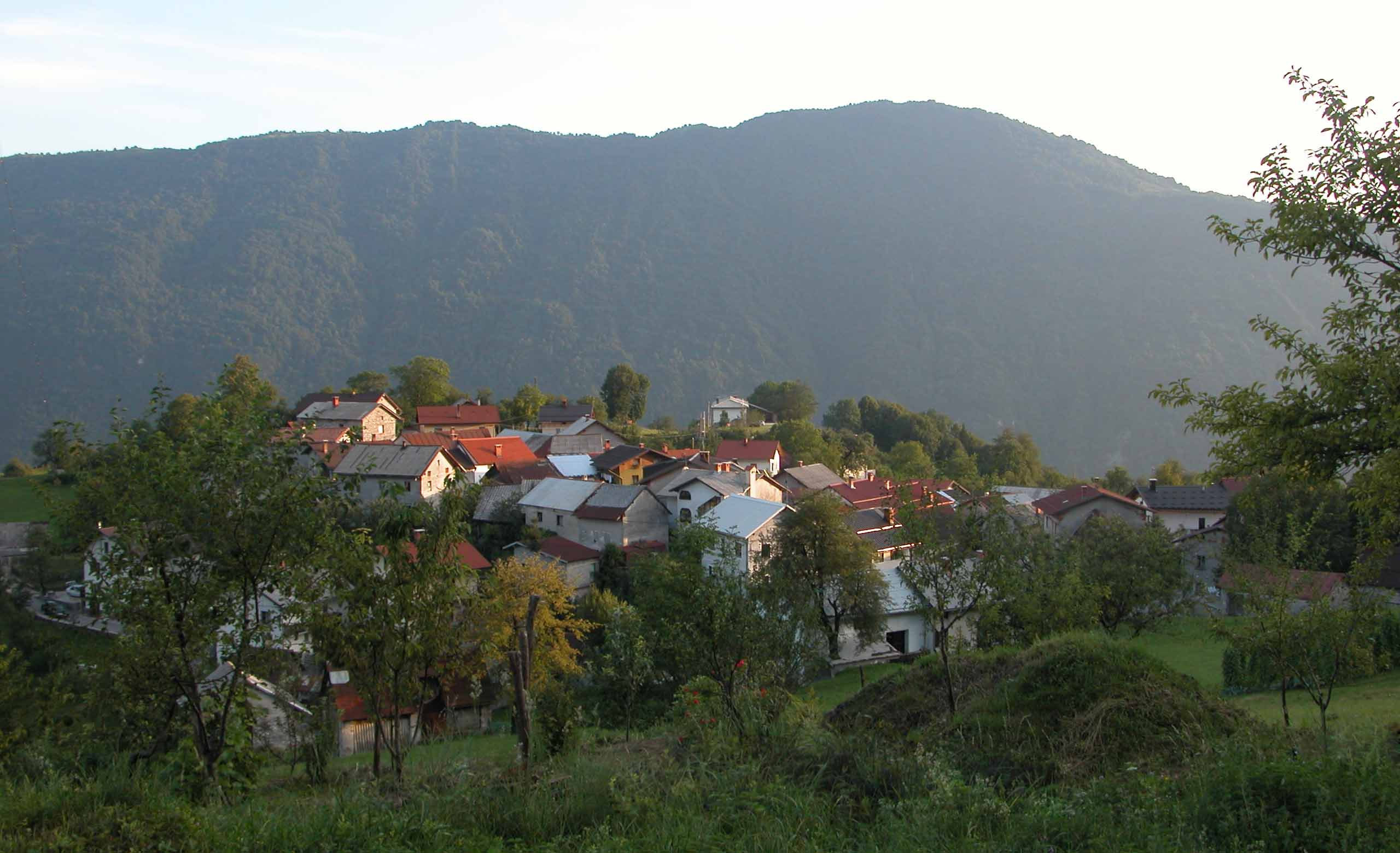
- Vrsno, with the Kolovrat Ridge in the background

- Location in Slovenia
- Coordinates: 46°13′29.41″N 13°38′39.44″E
- Country: Slovenia
- Traditional region: Slovenian Littoral
- Statistical region: Gorizia
- Municipality: Kobarid
- Elevation: 610 m (2,000 ft)

Population (2002)
  - Total: 143

Vrsno (pronounced [ˈʋəɾsnɔ]; Italian: Ursina) is a small village in the Municipality of Kobarid in the Littoral region of Slovenia.

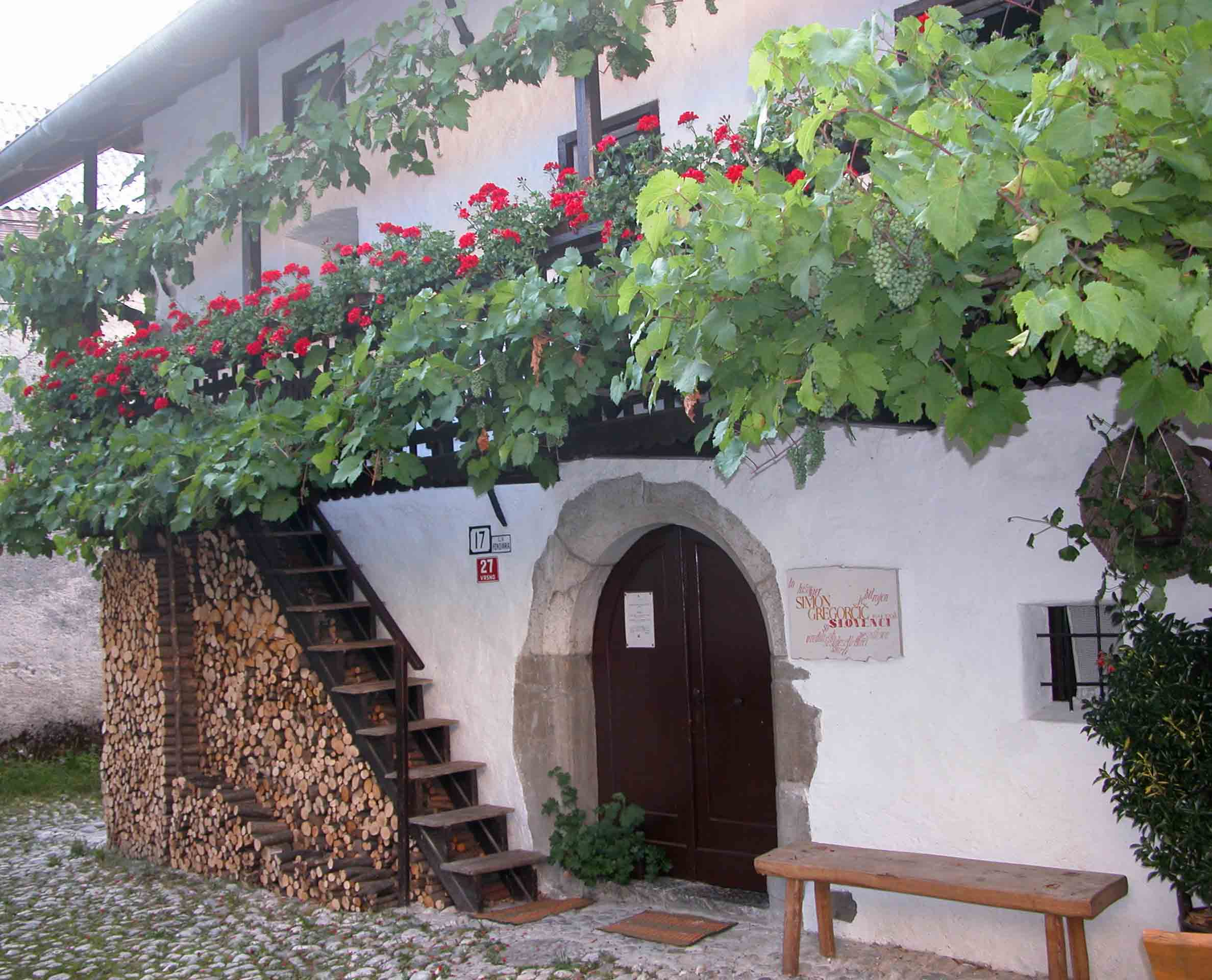
Simon Gregorčič's birthplace in Vrsno

Vrsno is best known as the birthplace of the poet Simon Gregorčič. Since 1966, Gregorčič's home has housed a small ethnographic museum with some exhibits from the poet's life. The museum also showcases the poet's artistic work, displays a timeline of historic events that occurred in his lifetime, and presents his relatives and notable contemporaries.

== Notable people ==
Notable people that were born or lived in Vrsno include:

- Anton Gregorčič (1852–1925), conservative politician
- Simon Gregorčič (1844–1906), poet
