= Matajur =

Mountain in Italy

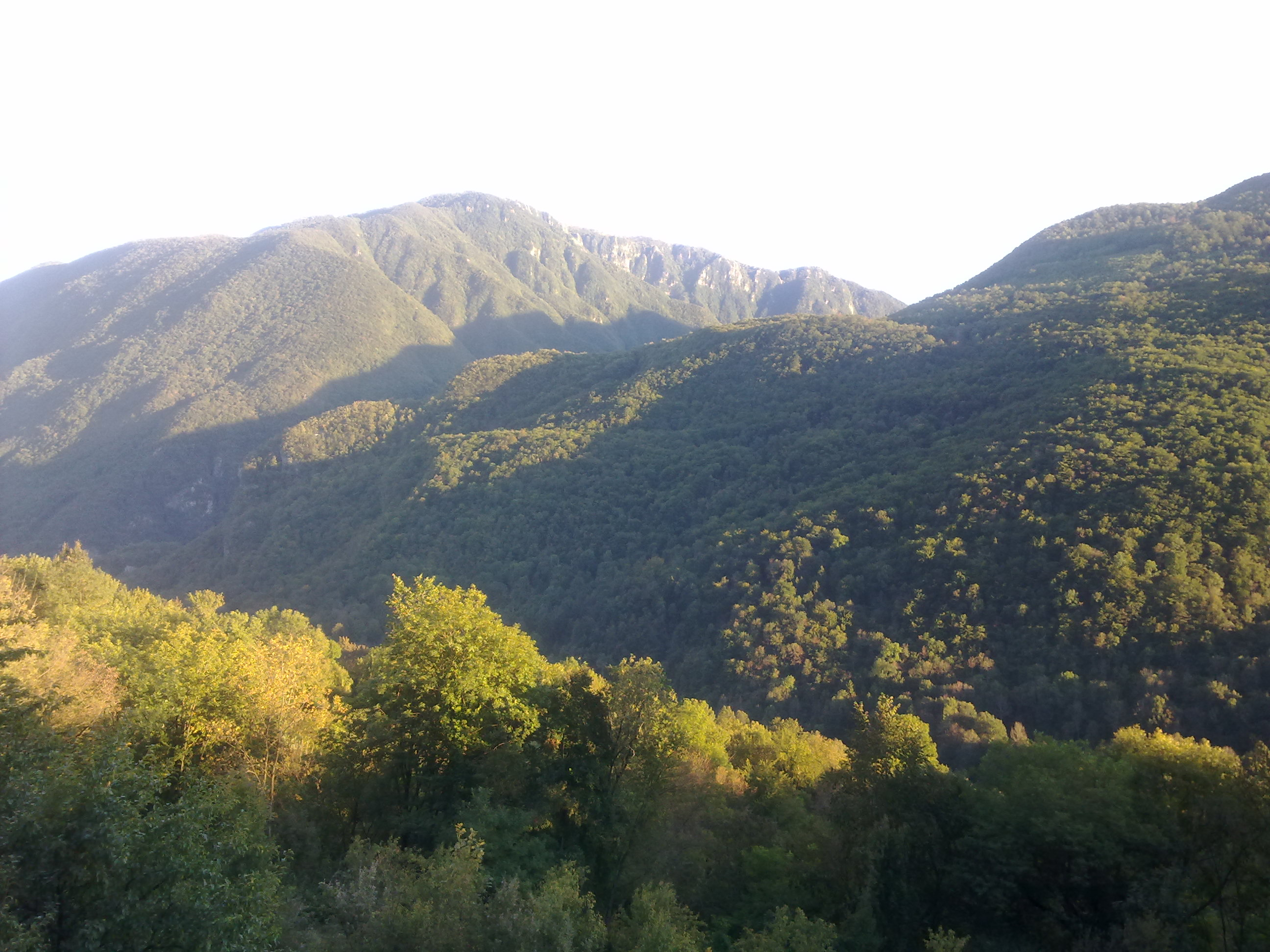
- View of Matajur from the village of Borjana (southwestern Slovenia)

Highest point
- Elevation: 1,650 m (5,410 ft)
- Prominence: 1,385 m (4,544 ft)
- Coordinates: 46°12′44″N 13°31′45″E

Geography
- Location within Alps
- Location: Slovenia / Italy
- Parent range: Julian Alps and Prealps

Matajur (pronounced [mataˈjuːɾ]) is a 1,642-meter (5,387 ft) mountain in the Julian Alps on the border between Italy and Slovenia. It is located on the border between the Soča Valley and the Italian mountainous region known as Venetian Slovenia, with views over the Adriatic Sea. Its prominence is 1,385 meters (4,544 ft).

== Name ==
Matajur was attested as Mons Regis circa 680, and as in Monte Majori in 1275. The Slovene name Matajur is derived via vowel harmony or akanye from *Motajur (< Mǫtmajur), which was borrowed from a Friulian name that developed from Romance Monte(m) maiōre(m) 'higher mountain'. It is known as Mat'jur in the local dialect, and in Friulian as Mòntmaiôr or Mataiûr (a reborrowing from Slovene). Another old name for this peak is Velika Baba.

== History ==
On 26 October 1917, Oberleutnant Erwin Rommel captured the mountain during the battle of Caporetto of World War I.

== See also ==
- Battle of Caporetto
- Kolovrat Range
