= Gorenji Log, Bovec =

Gorenji Log
- Location in Slovenia
- Coordinates: 46°21′40″N 15°32′48″E
- Country: Slovenia
- Traditional region: Slovenian Littoral
- Statistical region: Gorizia
- Municipality: Bovec
- Elevation: 321 m (1,053 ft)

Gorenji Log (pronounced [ɡɔˈɾeːnji ˈloːk], sometimes Gornji Log and often synonymous with Srednji Log) is a former settlement in the Municipality of Bovec in the Littoral region of Slovenia. It is now part of the village of Log pod Mangartom.

== Geography ==
Gorenji Log now forms the village center of Log pod Mangartom. Some sources distinguish two former settlements in the village center: Gorenji Log (abbreviated G. Log) north of Saint Stephen's Church, and Srednji Log (abbreviated Sr. Log) south of the church. Other sources label them as only one settlement called Gorenji Log (abbreviated G. Log), and still others as only one settlement called Srednji Log.

== Name ==
The name Gorenji Log literally means 'upper meadow' (cf. adjacent Srednji Log 'middle meadow' and Spodnji Log 'lower meadow'), derived from the Slovene common noun log 'partially forested (marshy) meadow near water' or 'woods near a settlement'. The name Log is shared with many other settlements in Slovenia. The corresponding German names (Oberbreth, Mittelbreth, Unterbreth) and Italian names (Bretto di sopra, Bretto di mezzo, Bretto di sotto or Bretto Sopra, Bretto Médio, Bretto Sotto) of the three locales are explained as derived from Italian prato 'meadow'. However, maps and printed sources apply the names Oberbreth and Bretto di sopra to Strmec na Predelu rather than the village center of Log pod Mangartom.

== History ==
Gorenji Log (indexed as Srednji Log) had a population of 161 living in 40 houses in 1880, 162 in 37 houses in 1890, and 195 in 38 houses in 1900. Gorenji Log was annexed by Log pod Mangartom in 1953, ending its existence as a separate settlement.
