= Pluzna =

Pluzna may refer to:

- Plužná, a municipality and village in the Czech Republic
- Plužna, a settlement in Slovenia
