= Municipality of Bovec =

Municipality of Slovenia

Municipality of Bovec Občina Bovec
- Municipality
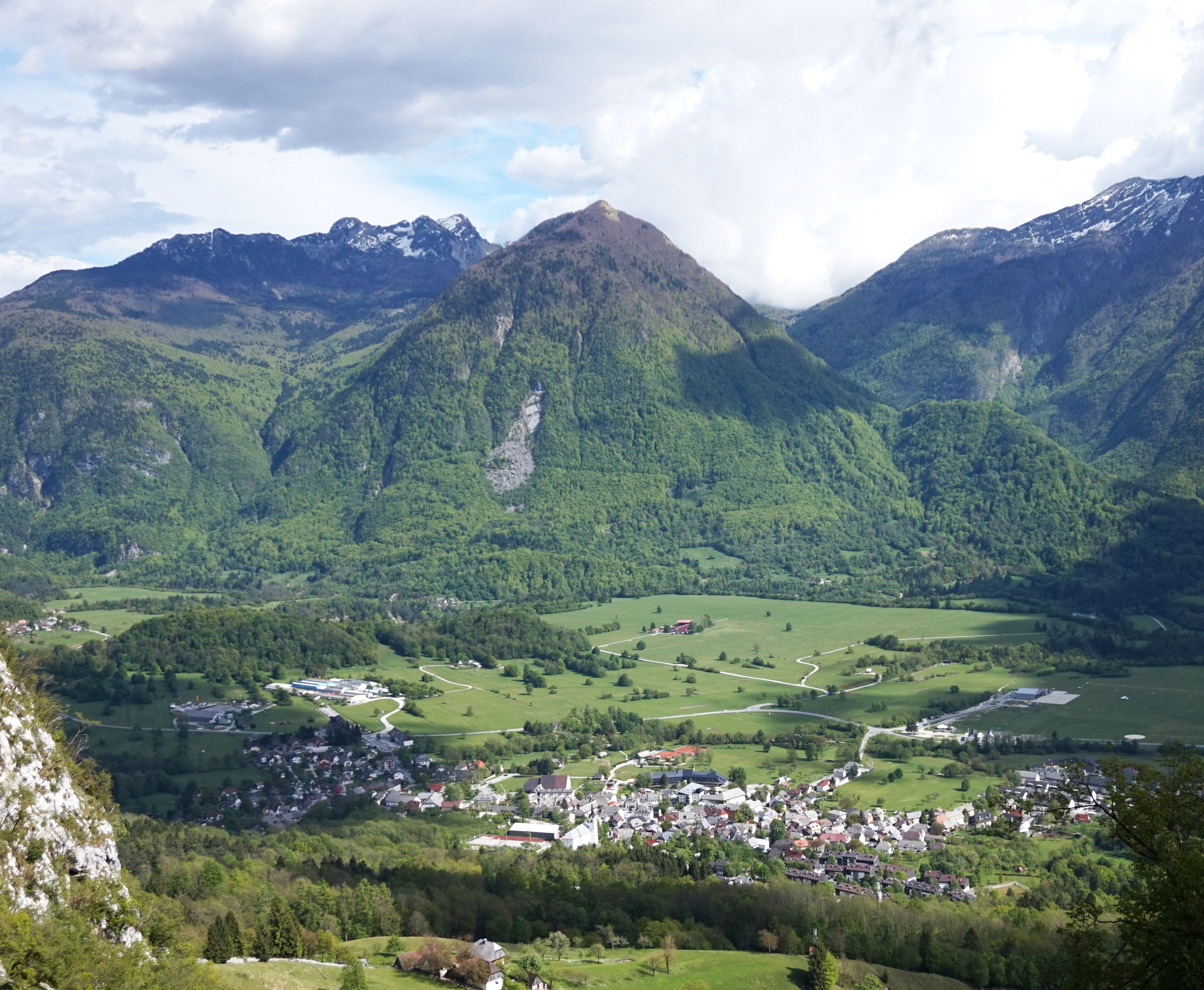

- Location of the Municipality of Bovec in Slovenia
- Coordinates: 46°20′0″N 13°33′0″E
- Country: Slovenia

Government
  - Mayor: Valter Mlekuž (SD)

Area
  - Total: 367.3 km^{2} (141.8 sq mi)
- Elevation: 448 m (1,470 ft)

Population (2025)
  - Total: 3,004
  - Density: 8.179/km^{2} (21.18/sq mi)
- Time zone: UTC+01 (CET)
  - Summer (DST): UTC+02 (CEST)
- Postal code: 5230
- Vehicle registration: GO
- Website: obcina.bovec.si

The Municipality of Bovec (pronounced [ˈbɔːʋəts] or [ˈboːʋəts]; Slovene: Občina Bovec) is a municipality in northwestern Slovenia. Its center is the town of Bovec. As of June 2016, its mayor is Valter Mlekuž.

== Geography ==
The northern parts of the municipality up the Trenta Valley to the peaks of Mts. Mangart, Jalovec, and Triglav are located within Triglav National Park, but not Bovec itself. Two of the most important mountain passes in the Julian Alps are located in the Municipality of Bovec: the Predil Pass on the border between Slovenia and Italy in the northwest, and the Vršič Pass in the northeast, which connects the Soča Valley to Kranjska Gora in the neighbouring Slovenian region of Upper Carniola. In the southwest the Učja (Uccea) Pass connects Bovec with the Resia Valley in Italy.

=== Settlements ===
In addition to the municipal seat of Bovec, the municipality also includes the following settlements:

- Bavšica
- Čezsoča
- Kal–Koritnica
- Lepena
- Log Čezsoški
- Log pod Mangartom
- Plužna
- Soča
- Srpenica
- Strmec na Predelu
- Trenta
- Žaga

== Politics ==
The Municipality of Bovec is governed by a mayor, elected every 4 years by popular vote, and a municipal council of 12 members. In national elections, Bovec has strongly favored conservative candidates, and it is considered one of the most loyal strongholds of the Slovenian Democratic Party in the whole country. In the local elections, however, the vote is usually more dispersed, although mayors of the Slovenian Democratic Party have governed the municipality since 1998.

== Tourism ==
Several natural sights are included in the Municipality of Bovec, such as the source of the Soča River, the 106-meter (348 ft) Boka Falls, the Kanin Ski Resort, and the Trenta Valley, connected to Bovec by a hiking trail. The municipality has a well-developed tourist industry, centered in the town of Bovec itself, with numerous hotels, and an airfield (LJBO).
