= Trenta (valley) =

Valley in the Julian Alps in Slovenia

Coordinates: 46.3894°N 13.7465°E

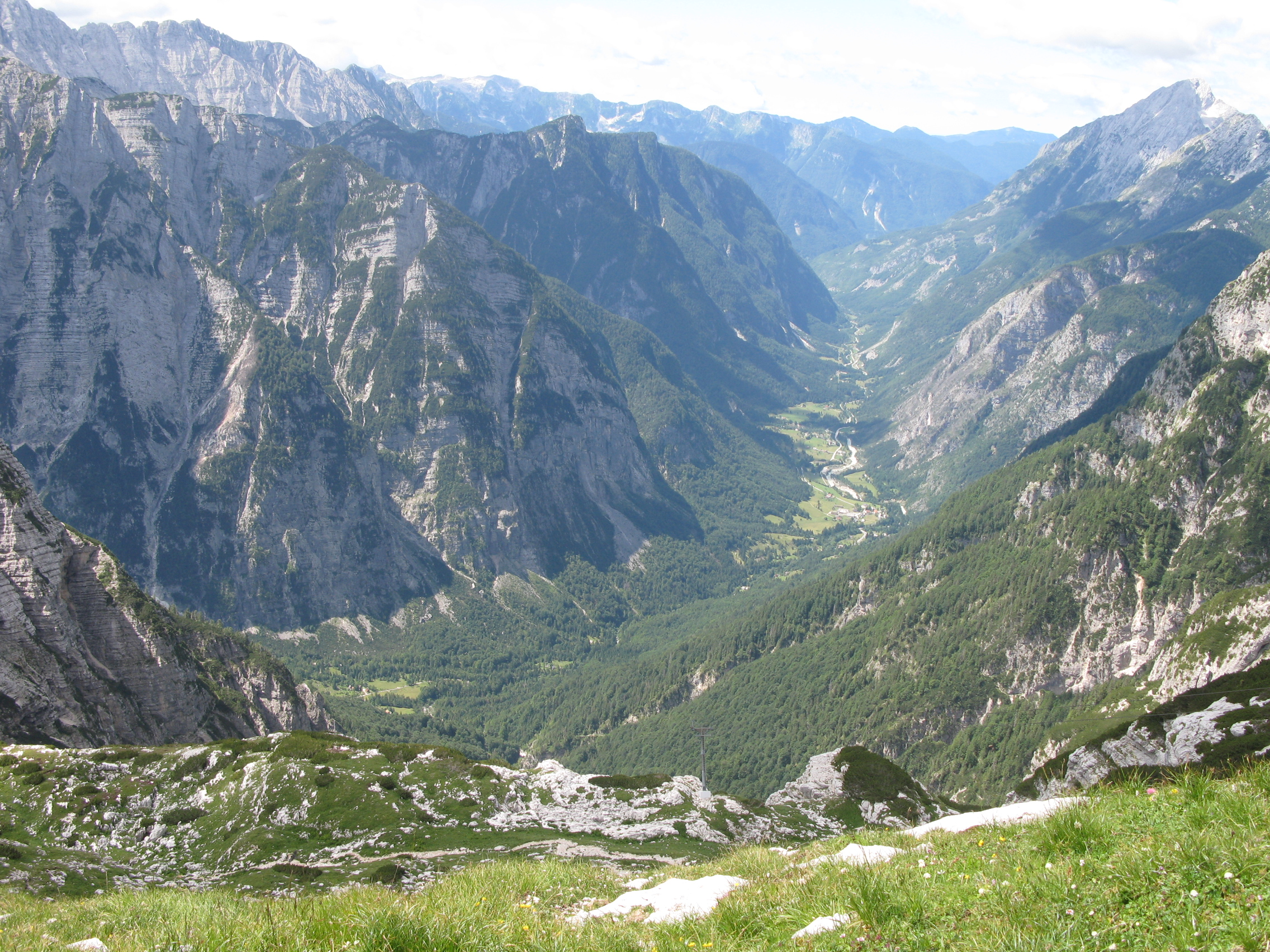
View of the Trenta Valley from the northeast

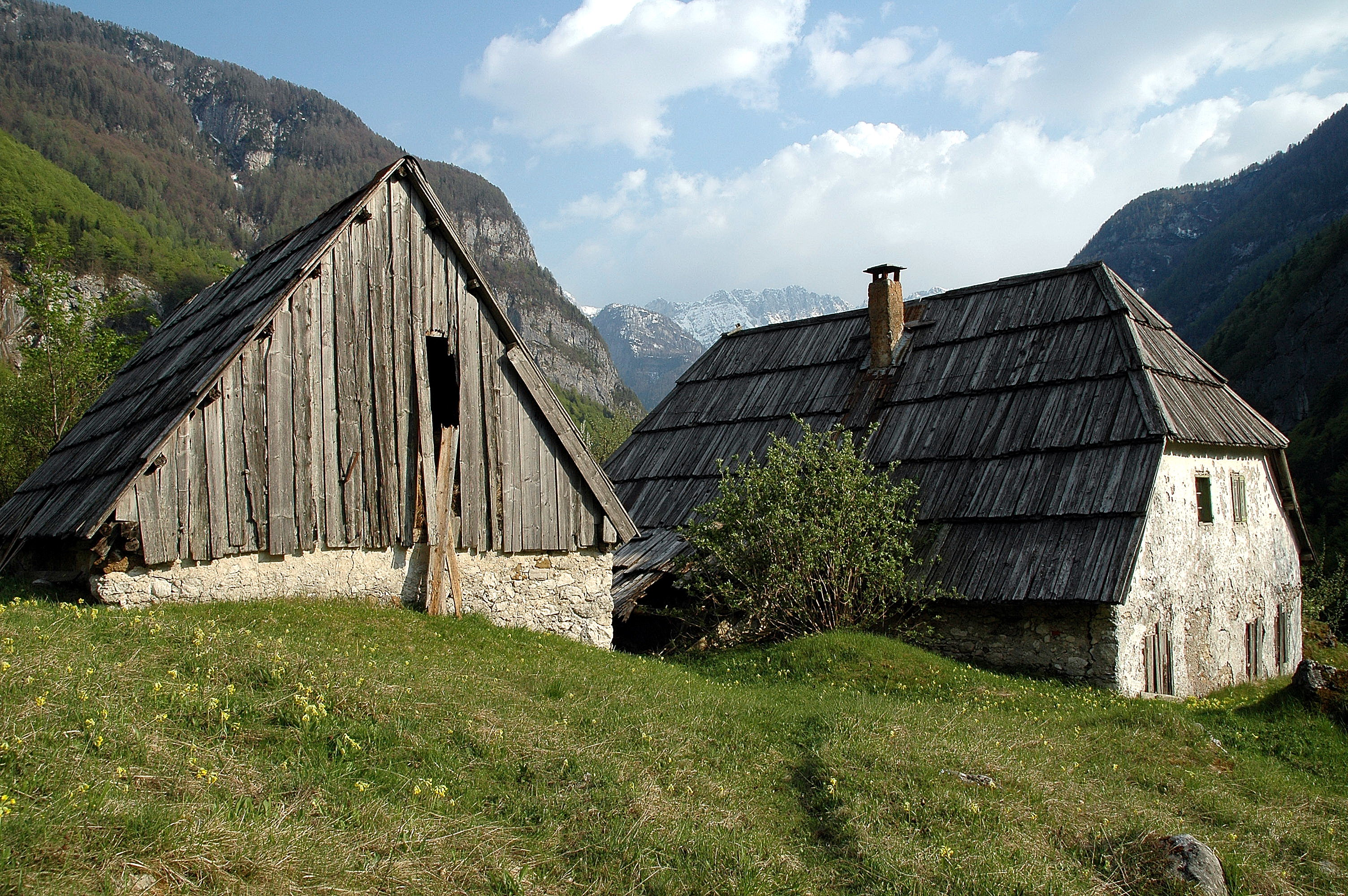
Traditional houses in the Upper Trenta Valley

The Trenta Valley (pronounced [ˈtɾeːnta]) is a valley in the Julian Alps in the northern part of the traditional Gorizia region (Slovene: Goriška) of Slovenia.

== Geography ==
The source of the Soča River and the settlements of Soča, Lepena, and Trenta are located in the Trenta Valley. The Vršič Pass connects the valley with Upper Carniola to the east. The Soča flows generally southwest through the valley and then onwards to Bovec.

== Name ==
The name Trenta is of Friulian origin and was borrowed into Slovene. The name developed from *Tridenta, meaning 'three-tooth' or 'divided into three teeth'. This reflects the geography because the valley splits into the Soča and Zadnjica valleys, and the latter is soon split again by White Creek (Beli Potok), creating three closely spaced summits.
