= Kal–Koritnica =

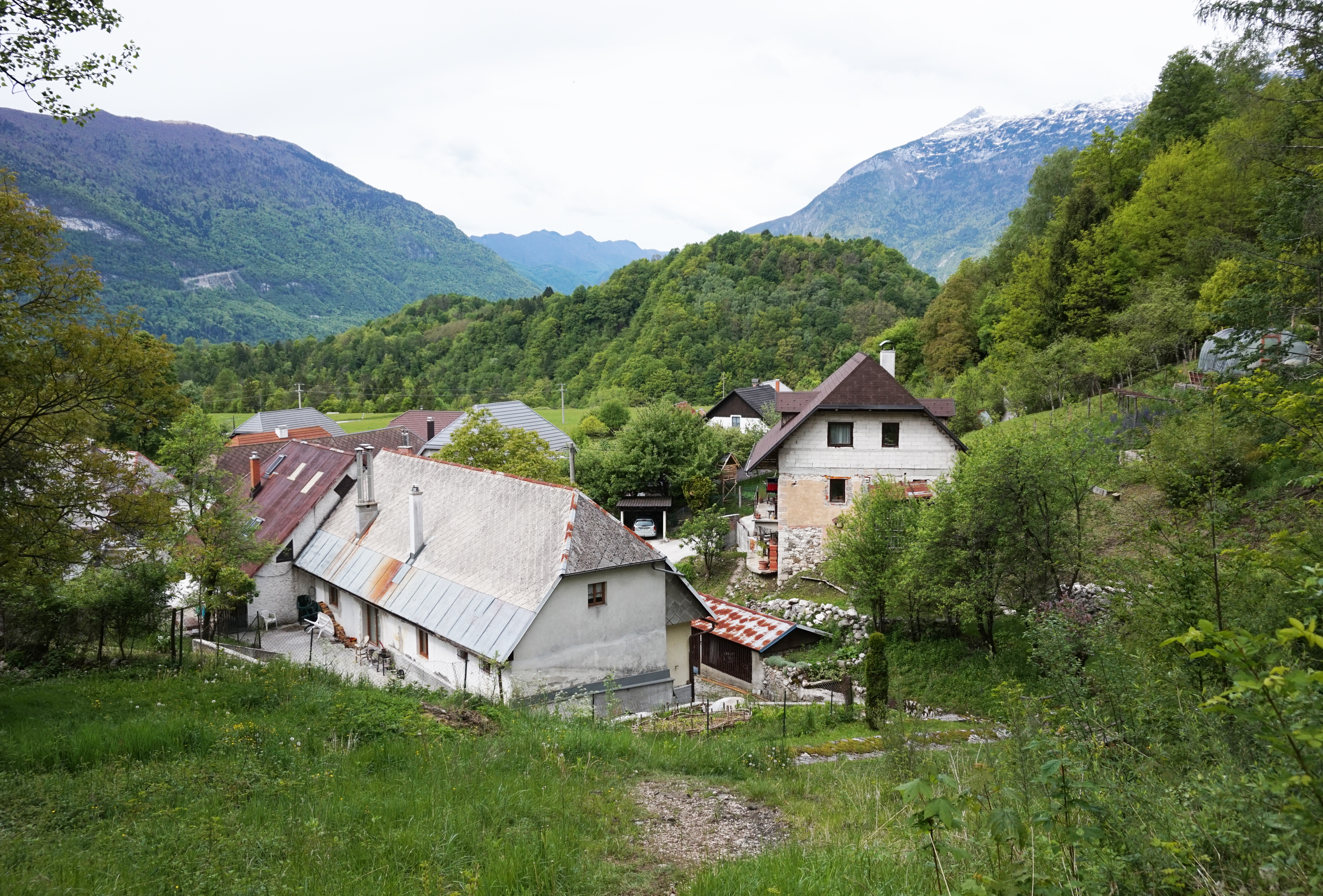

- Location in Slovenia
- Coordinates: 46°20′11.74″N 13°34′41.78″E
- Country: Slovenia
- Traditional region: Slovenian Littoral
- Statistical region: Gorizia
- Municipality: Bovec

Area
  - Total: 7.87 km^{2} (3.04 sq mi)
- Elevation: 460.4 m (1,510 ft)

Population (2020)
  - Total: 131
  - Density: 16.6/km^{2} (43.1/sq mi)

Kal–Koritnica (pronounced [ˈkaːu̯ kɔˈɾiːtnitsa]; Slovene: Kal-Koritnica, Italian: Cal – Coritenza) is a village in the Municipality of Bovec in the Littoral region of Slovenia.

== Geography ==
Kal–Koritnica stands on a sun-exposed terrace below Mount Svinjak to the northeast and above the confluence of the Soča and Koritnica rivers to the southwest. In addition to the village's double core of Kal (to the east) and Koritnica (to the west), it also contains the outlying hamlets of Pri Kukču, Čerče, Kolovrat, and Malnik (from north to south).

== History ==
There is a monument to Partisans killed in what was one of the worst battles in the Bovec area during the Second World War. This took place on 26 April 1943 on the Golobar alpine pasture, when Italian soldiers surrounded the gathered Partisans and 42 soldiers died in the crossfire. Their bodies were taken into the village to the place where the monument stands today and later transported to Bovec, where they were buried in a mass grave at the local cemetery.
