= Log pod Mangartom Mosque =

Former mosque in Slovenia

- Slovene: Džamija v Logu pod Mangartom
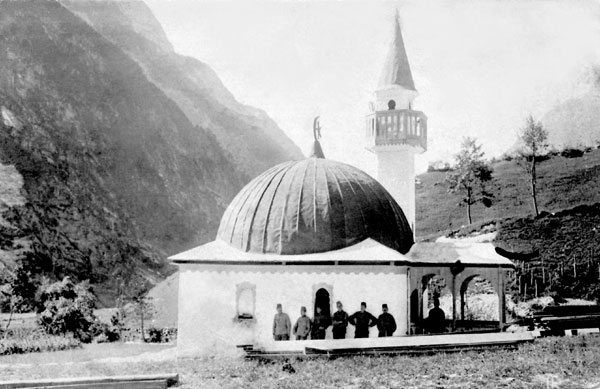
- The mosque in c. 1918, prior to its demolition

- Location of the destroyed mosque in Slovenia

Religion
- Affiliation: Sunni Islam (former)
- Ecclesiastical or organizational status: Mosque (1916–1920s)
- Status: Demolished

Location
- Location: Log pod Mangartom, Austrian Littoral
- Country: Austria-Hungary (Slovenia from 1918)
- Interactive map of Log pod Mangartom Mosque
- Coordinates: 46°24′17.68″N 13°35′52.49″E

Architecture
- Type: Ottoman architecture
- Completed: 1916
- Demolished: 1920s

Specifications
- Dome: Obe
- Minaret: One
- Materials: Stone; timber

The Log pod Mangartom Mosque (Slovene: Džamija v Logu pod Mangartom) was a Sunni Islam mosque that stood from 1916 until the 1920s near the village of Log pod Mangartom in the Austrian Littoral, Austria-Hungary, in the area of what is now the Municipality of Bovec in northwestern Slovenia. It was the first mosque to be purpose-built until 2013 in Slovenian territory, although one converted out of a pre-existing building has functioned in the town of Jesenice since 1989.

== History ==
The mosque was built by Bosnian Muslim members of the Austro-Hungarian army serving on the Isonzo Front of World War I. For their religious needs, the military authorities permitted them to erect a small mosque in November 1916 at the foot of the eastern Alps. The building was mostly built of cut stone, with a carved wooden porch, a domed roof, and a square minaret, and it was surrounded by a stone wall and gated iron fence. An area near the mosque was designated the Log pod Mangartom Military Cemetery, where fallen Austro-Hungarian soldiers of all faiths were buried.

At the end of World War I, the Bosnian Muslim troops returned home and left the mosque untended. Italy, which subsequently annexed the area, demolished the deteriorating mosque some years later. The only surviving record of its existence are six photos preserved by local citizens.

== See also ==
- Islam in Slovenia
- List of mosques in Slovenia
