= Soča, Bovec =

Place in Slovenian Littoral, Slovenia

Soča
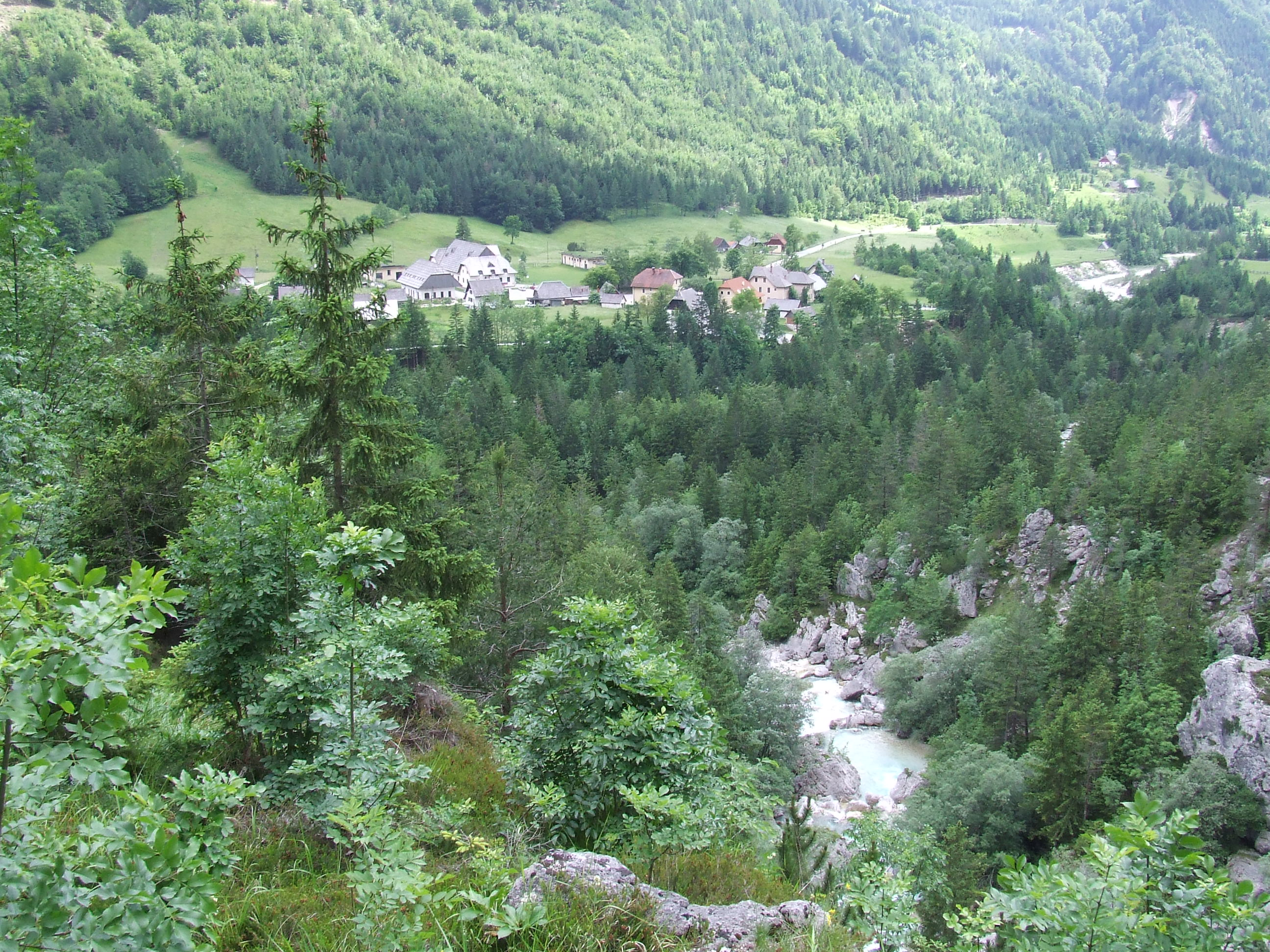

- Location in Slovenia
- Coordinates: 46°20′32.53″N 13°40′10.96″E
- Country: Slovenia
- Traditional region: Slovenian Littoral
- Statistical region: Gorizia
- Municipality: Bovec

Area
  - Total: 43.48 km^{2} (16.79 sq mi)
- Elevation: 491.6 m (1,613 ft)

Population (2020)
  - Total: 137
  - Density: 3.15/km^{2} (8.16/sq mi)

Soča (pronounced [ˈsoːtʃa], Italian: Sonzia) is a dispersed settlement in the Municipality of Bovec in northwestern Slovenia.

== Geography ==
Soča is located on the upper Soča River in the Goriška region, the northern part of the Slovene Littoral, on the road from Bovec up to Trenta and the Vršič Pass. The territory of the village includes scattered farms on various foothills, promontories, and terraces in the narrow valley. Hamlets and farmsteads in the village include Brvca (a.k.a. Jezerca), Črč, Gorenja Soča, Lemovje, Log, Mišja Vas, Na Skali, Pod Bregom, Pod Skalo, Podklanec, Pri Kumerčih, V Klancu, Vršičem, and Vrsnik. To the northwest, the valley rises steeply to Mount Bavšica Grintavec (2,344 meters or 7,690 feet) and Little Mount Grintavec (2,277 meters or 7,470 feet). To the southeast, the valley rises more gradually to a plateau region.

== Name ==
The settlement is named after the Soča River. The name Soča is derived from the form *Sǫťa, which was borrowed from Latin (and Romance) Sontius. In turn, this is probably based on the substrate name *Aisontia, presumably derived from the PIE root *Hei̯s- 'swift, rushing', referring to a quickly moving river. Another possible origin is the pre-Romance root *ai̯s- 'water, river'.

== History ==
In antiquity the area was settled by Illyarians and Celts until the Romans conquered the area. After the fall of the Western Roman Empire it was ruled by Ostrogoths, Lombards, and Byzantines. In the 6th century South Slavs settled in the area. In the Middle Ages, the area south of the pass was ruled by the Patriarchs of Aquileia, later by the Republic of Venice and the March of Verona, until the estates were incorporated into the Inner Austrian lands under Habsburg Emperor Maximilian I in 1509.

The area was part of Italy after the First World War. It was awarded to Yugoslavia after the Second World War. During the war, the area was controlled by Slovenian Partisans after the Italian surrender. Partisan hospitals operated in the village and it came under attack from German forces stationed in Bovec.

== Church ==
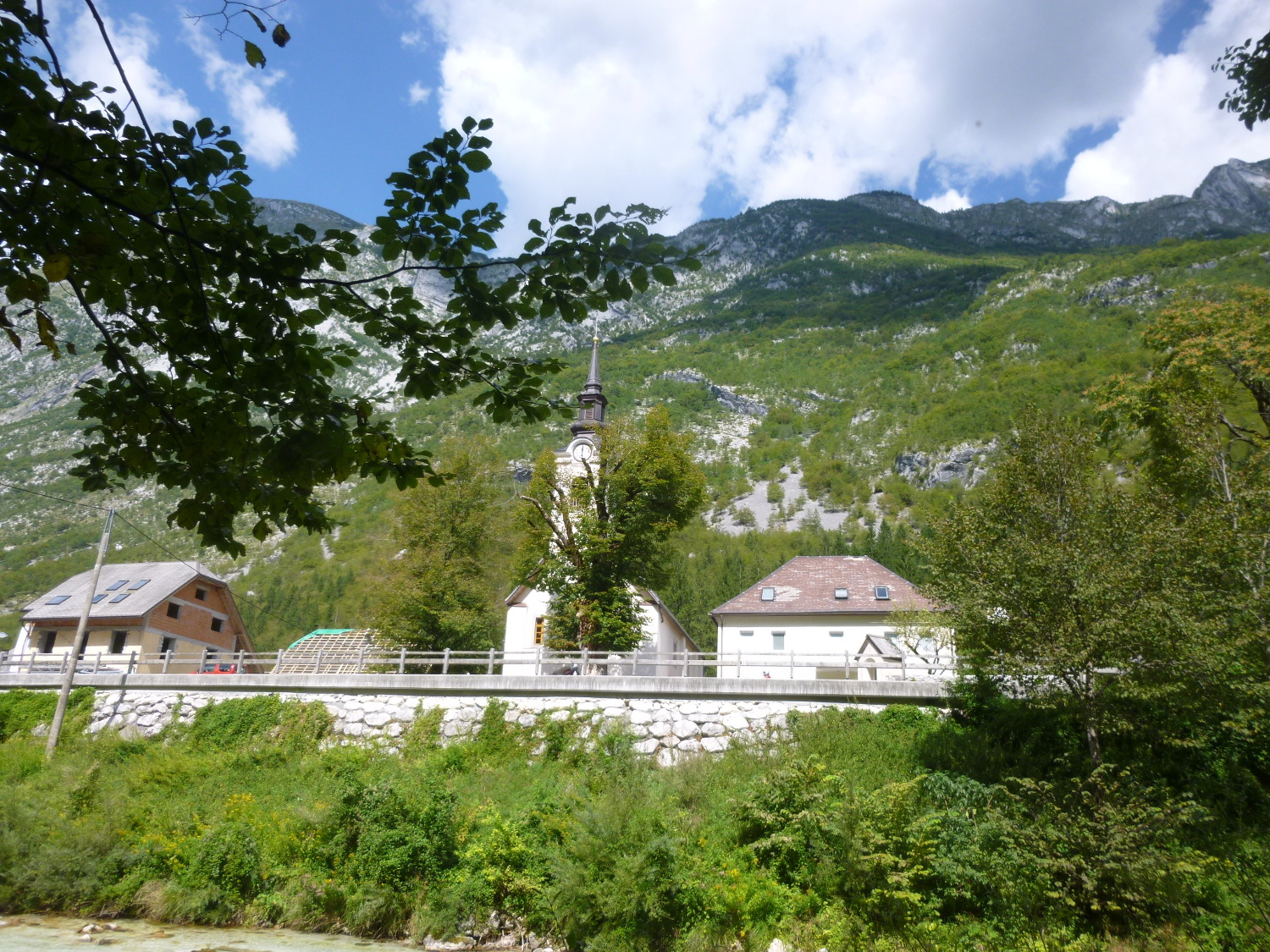
St Joseph's Church

A small church by the roadside in the village is dedicated to Saint Joseph and was built in 1718 and dedicated in 1823. In 1944 it was refurbished and painted by Tone Kralj. The refurbishment was a political statement and he included a scene of Archangel Michael fighting the Devil, in which Hitler and Mussolini are shown as enemies, fighting on the side of the Devil. He also used the Slovene national colours (red, white, and blue) in the interior and, apart from the Apostles and the Four Evangelists, used only Slavic saints in the iconography. Behind the church, the Sοča Military Cemetery is a burial ground for Austrian soldiers that died on the Isonzo front.
