= Log Čezsoški =

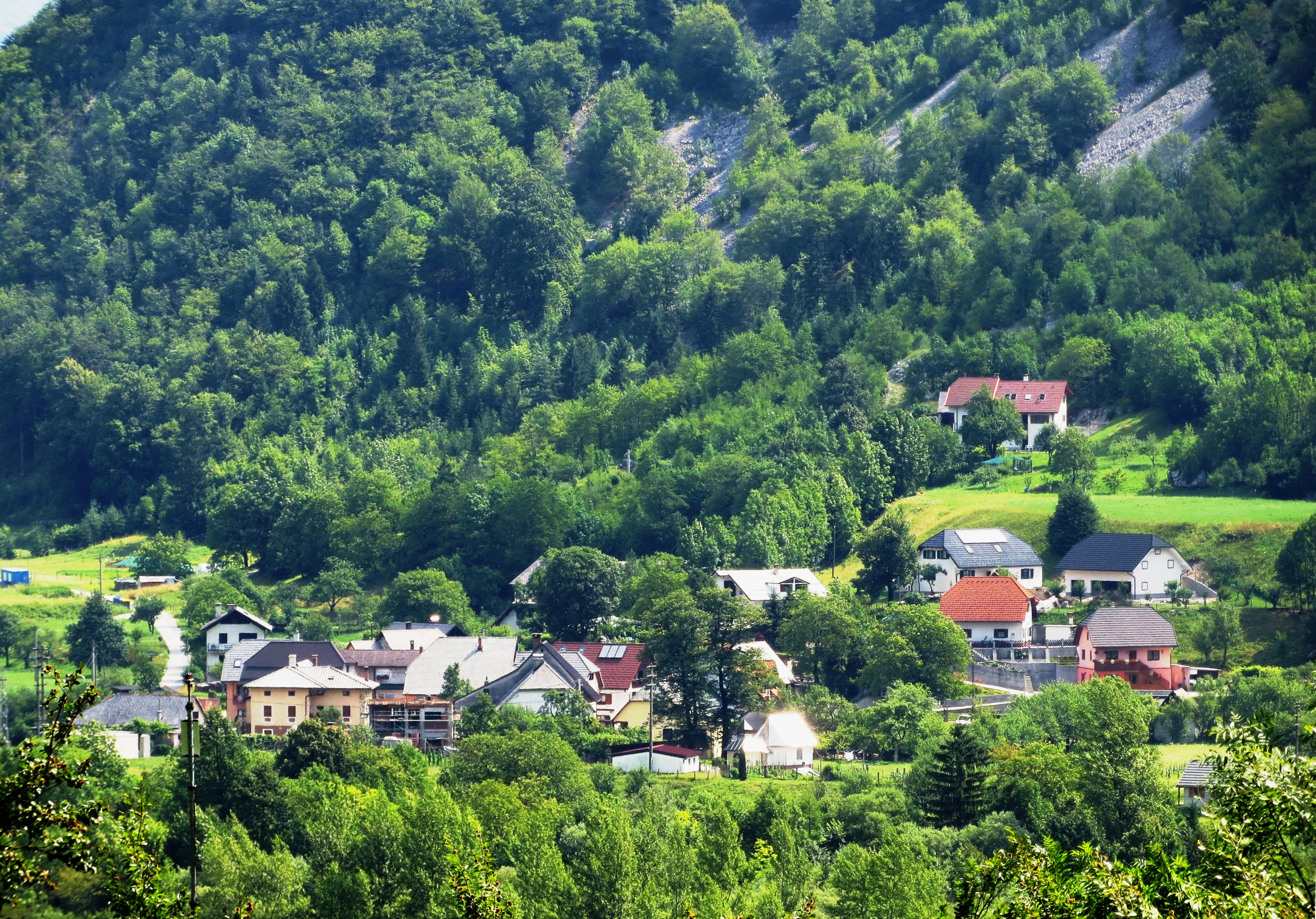

- Location in Slovenia
- Coordinates: 46°18′40.2″N 13°29′23.03″E
- Country: Slovenia
- Traditional region: Slovenian Littoral
- Statistical region: Gorizia
- Municipality: Bovec

Area
  - Total: 0.73 km^{2} (0.28 sq mi)
- Elevation: 344.4 m (1,130 ft)

Population (2020)
  - Total: 65
  - Density: 89/km^{2} (230/sq mi)

Log Čezsoški (pronounced [ˈloːk tʃɛˈsoːʃki]; Italian: Loga d'Oltresonzia) is a small settlement on left bank of the Soča River in the Municipality of Bovec in the Littoral region of Slovenia.

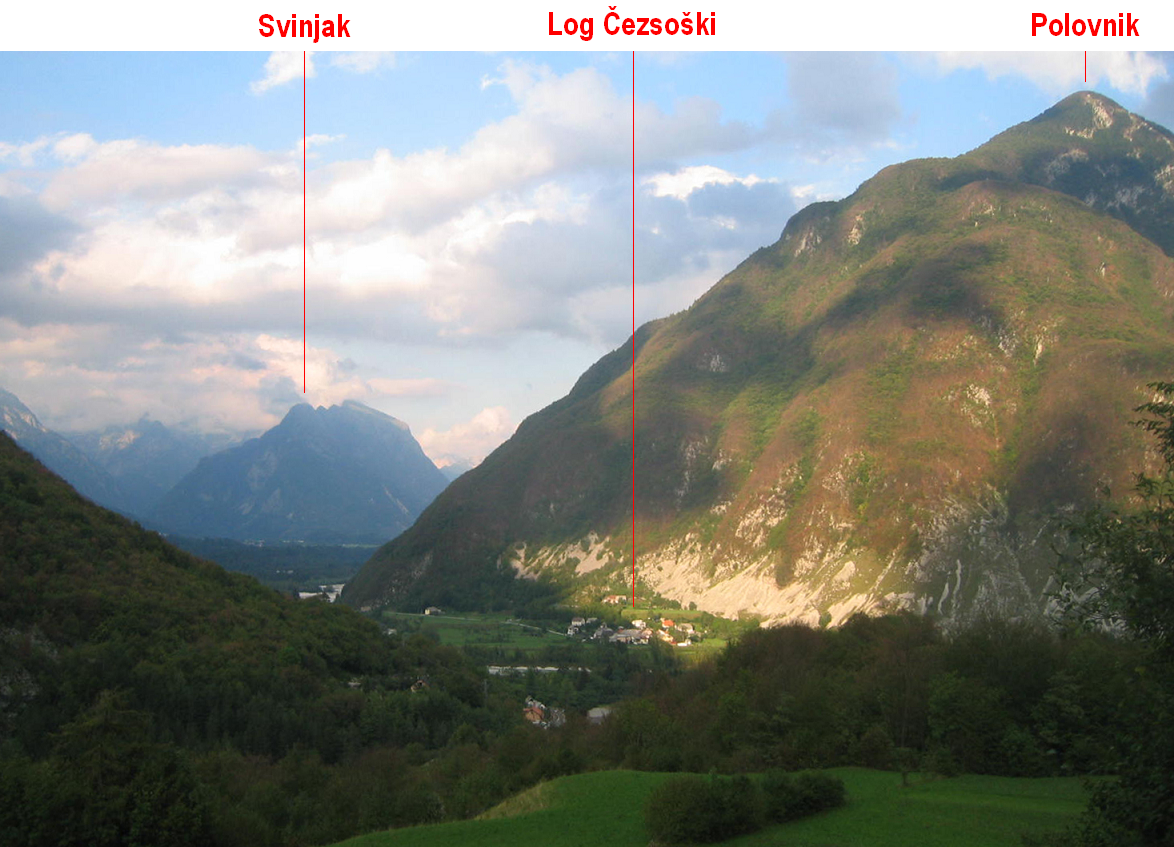
Log Čezsoški and surroundings
