= Valentina Pielich =

Tina Vajtova - Slovenian peddler and Resian storyteller (1900–1984)

Valentina Pielich – Tina Vajtova
- Born: Valentina Pielich; March 4, 1900; Ladina, Solbica (Resia), Italy
- Died: February 21, 1984; Pordenone, Italy
- Occupations: peddler, storyteller

Valentina Pielich, also known as Tina Vajtova (also Tina Vajtawa), (4 March 1900 – 21 February 1984), was a Resian Slovenian peddler and a folk storyteller of Resian fairy tales. With more than 400 different folk stories told, she is considered one of the best folk storytellers of Resian fairy tales.

== Childhood ==
She was born on 4 March 1900 in Ladina, a small village on the eastern edge of Solbica in the Resia Valley, into a Slovenian family in a house known as Pri Vajtovih. Her mother was the peddler and trader of hair and small goods Žvana Siega (1861–1930), and her father was the grinder Giosuè Pielich (1861–1904). She had two brothers, who died young, and a sister. When she was four, her father froze to death while on a grinding journey in Zlatar. Her only schooling consisted of three years of primary school in her native village. She enjoyed listening to fairy tales, especially from her mother, who was a skilled storyteller.

== Work ==
After primary school she joined her mother and sister on their peddling routes and became a peddler herself. She purchased hair and sold thread, ribbons, combs, buttons, thimbles, and other small goods. In 1921, she married the grinder Žvan Negro (1898–1953), born in Ojska in Resia Valley. They had eight children, four girls and four boys. Only four of the children reached adulthood. She outlived all her children except the youngest daughter. During her peddling journeys she heard many fairy tales. In Istria, Trnovo, Pivka, and Vipava she often met other Resian peddler women. Along with exchanging fresh experiences, storytelling was always part of their gatherings. She had an excellent memory and knew more than four hundred fairy tales and stories. She latter said, “For a fairy tale I would have crawled on bare knees into Venice!” and “For a fairy tale I would jump into fire or water.” In 1965, her daughter, a factory worker with two children, became widowed, and Tina moved to Pordenone to help her. She lived with her until her death.

== Collaboration with Milko Matičetov ==
In 1966, the Slovenian ethnologist and ethnographer Milko Matičetov heard about her and her gift for storytelling. He first visited her in August 1966. From 1966 until 1984 she recounted to him over four hundred fairy tales and stories. She also told him many songs, proverbs, riddles, descriptions of old customs, various memories, and autobiographical narratives. She recounted everything in Resian dialect. Her daughter assisted Milko Matičetov with transcription. All the material is preserved and organised at the Institute of Slovenian Ethnology of the SAZU. In the summer of 1967, TV Slovenia filmed a documentary about Tina near Učja for its television series Pri naših pravljičarjih (Among our storytellers). Afterwards she visited Ljubljana with her daughter and Milko Matičetov. At that time fairy tales poured out of her so intensely that they had to be written down even on the road. Many of her tales were published by Milko Matičetov in the book Zverinice iz Rezije (Little Beasts from Resia). The best-known tales she narrated include: Dekle, ki je hotelo rožico (The Girl Who Wanted a Little Flower), Dvanajst ujcev (Twelve uncles), and Rusica pregnala babici Mujo Karotovo (Rusica Drove Away Muja Karotova).

== Later life and death ==
During the last ten years of her life she was often ill and spent much time in hospital. Every summer, when she returned to her native village, she somewhat recovered . She last met with Milko Matičetov in January 1984 and entrusted him with several more stories. Even in the last recordings made by her daughter in early 1984 one can still feel her vivid gift and storytelling mastery. She died on 21 February 1984 in Pordenone, where she is also buried.
