= Log pod Mangartom =

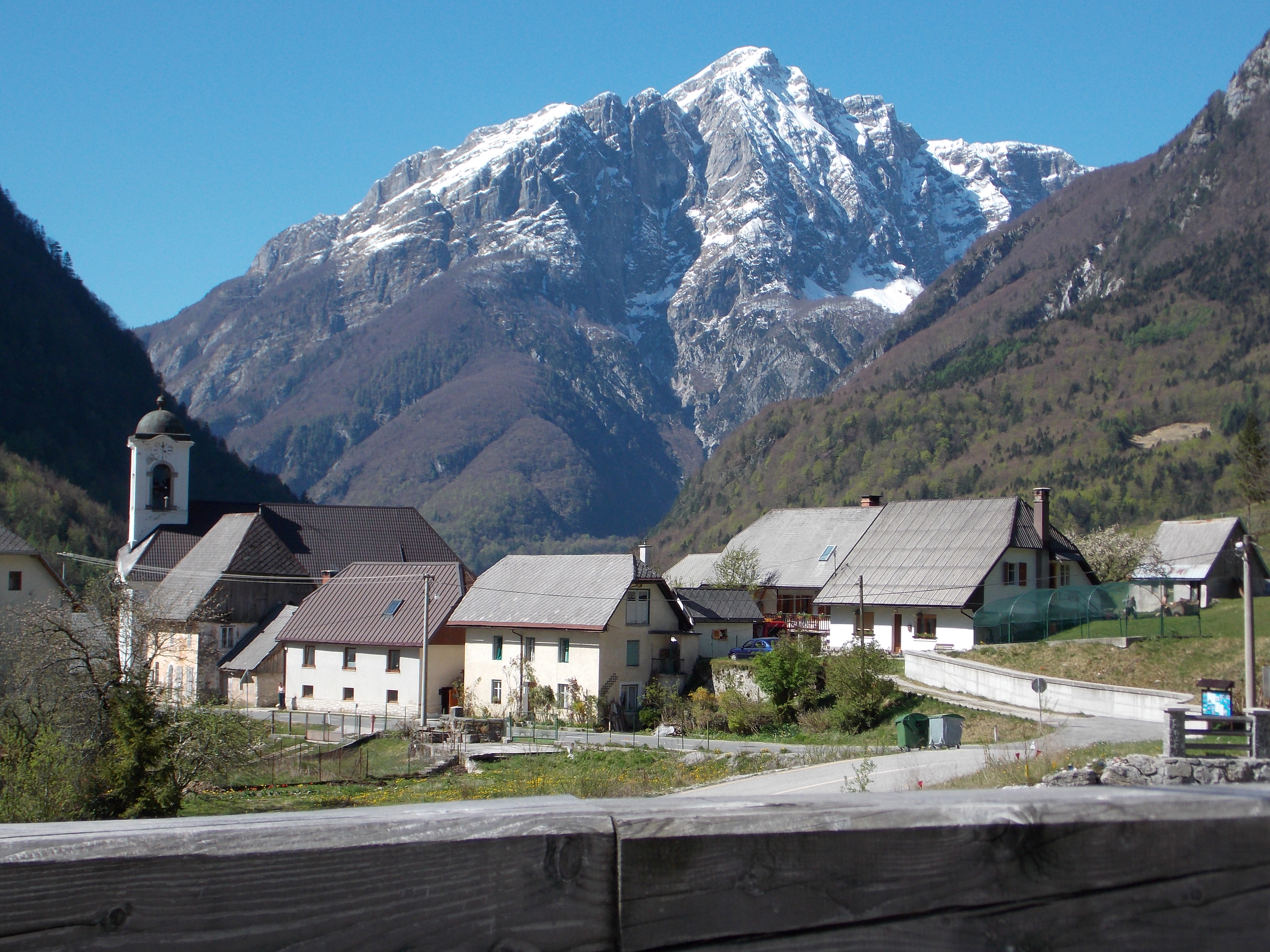

- Location in Slovenia
- Coordinates: 46°24′21.27″N 13°36′11.29″E
- Country: Slovenia
- Traditional region: Slovenian Littoral
- Statistical region: Gorizia
- Municipality: Bovec

Area
  - Total: 40.55 km^{2} (15.66 sq mi)
- Elevation: 643.7 m (2,112 ft)

Population (2020)
  - Total: 133
  - Density: 3.28/km^{2} (8.49/sq mi)

Log pod Mangartom (pronounced [ˈloːk pɔd ˈmaːnɡaɾtɔm]; sometimes Log pod Mangrtom; Italian: Bretto; German: Breth), is a settlement in the Municipality of Bovec in the Littoral region of Slovenia. It comprises the former villages of Gorenji Log and Spodnji Log as well as the hamlets of Loška Koritnica, Možnica, and Pustina.

== Geography ==
Log pod Mangartom lies in the Log Koritnica Valley (Slovene: Loška Koritnica) within Triglav National Park and is surrounded by 15 peaks with an elevation of over 2,000 m, giving it a unique atmosphere and making it an attractive starting point for hikers. The Log Cliff (Slovene: Loška stena, Italian: Parete di Bretto) rises directly southeast of Log pod Mangartom. The road from Bovec to Tarvisio over the Predil Pass and the Predel Viaduct (the viaduct has the longest arch (85 m) in the Alps) runs through the settlement. Between Gorenji Log and Spodnji Log is the entrance to the 4.5 km (2.8 mi.) Štoln drainage tunnel leading through Sheep Mountain (Slovene: Ovčja gora) of the Kolovrat Range to the former lead mine in Cave del Predil, Italy.

== History ==
The Štoln Tunnel was opened in 1903 and was used for a railway during World War I. It was later used for transport of miners and political refugees escaping from the Communist Yugoslavia. In November 2000, a landslide destroyed a large part of the village and took the lives of seven people.

== Church ==
The parish church in the settlement is dedicated to Saint Stephen. It was built at the end of the 18th century and later rebuilt. Frescos by the Impressionist painter Ivan Grohar in the sanctuary depict the stoning of Saint Stephen. It also contains a late 15th-century wooden sculpture of The Virgin enthroned as Queen and a Baroque painting of Saint Sebastian.

== Mosque ==
The town is notable for once being the location of the Log pod Mangartom Mosque, which until 2013 was the only mosque ever built in Slovenia, erected by Bosnian Muslim troops in the service of Austria-Hungary during World War I. After the war, the Bosnian Muslim troops returned home to Bosnia and Herzegovina and the mosque was abandoned and the deteriorating structure was demolished by the local Italian government, which had taken over the area.

== Notable people ==
Notable people that were born or lived in Log pod Mangartom include:

- Zorko Jelinčič (1900–1965), alpinist and journalist
- Ivan Likar (a.k.a. Sočan) (1921–1991), People's Hero of Yugoslavia
- Mihael Strukel (1851–1922), civil engineer and technical writer
