= Žaga, Bovec =

Žaga
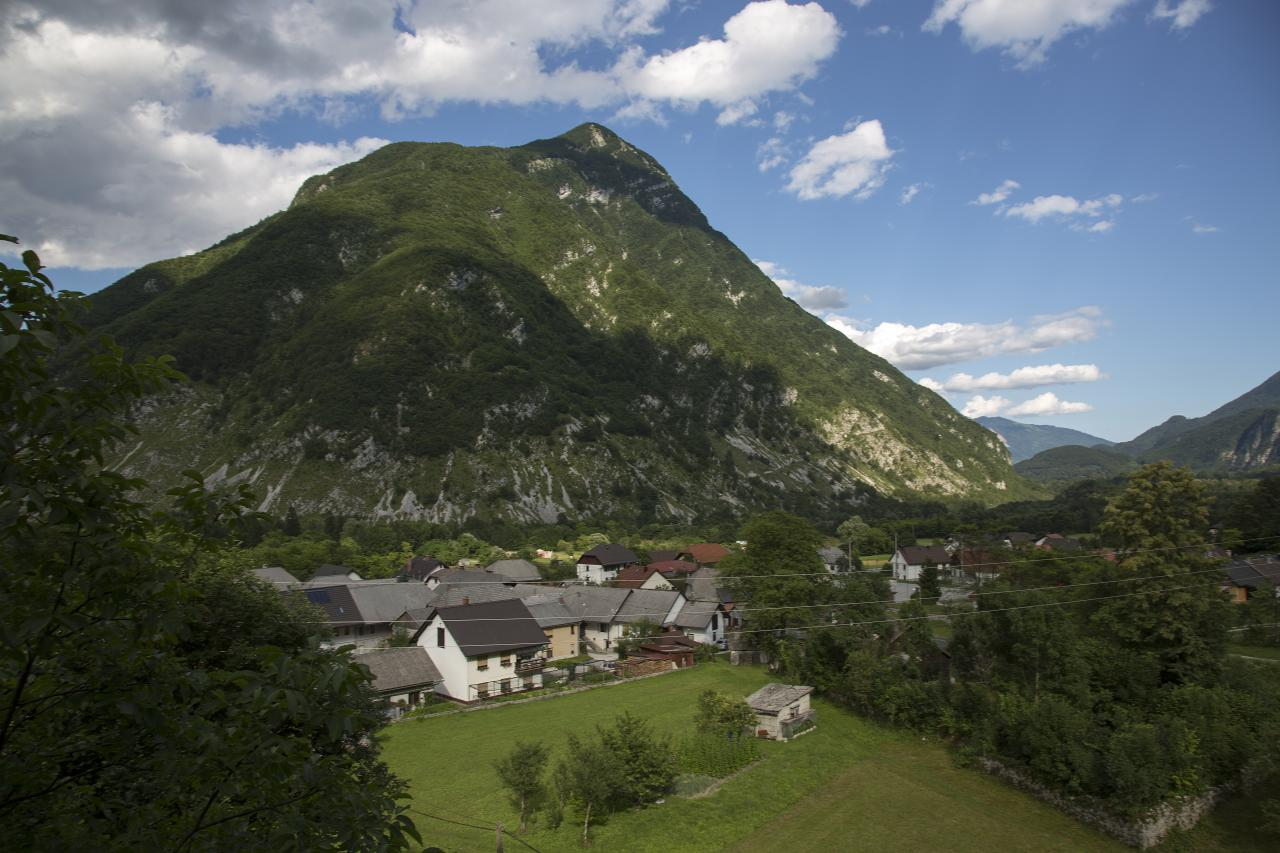

- Location in Slovenia
- Coordinates: 46°18′4.67″N 13°28′41.47″E
- Country: Slovenia
- Traditional region: Slovenian Littoral
- Statistical region: Gorizia
- Municipality: Bovec

Area
  - Total: 25.78 km^{2} (9.95 sq mi)
- Elevation: 419.1 m (1,375 ft)

Population (2020)
  - Total: 312
  - Density: 12.1/km^{2} (31.3/sq mi)

Žaga (pronounced [ˈʒaːɡa]; Italian: Saga) is a settlement on the right bank of the Soča River in the Municipality of Bovec in the Littoral region of Slovenia. The turn for the road to Resia in Italy is in the middle of the settlement.

== Geography ==
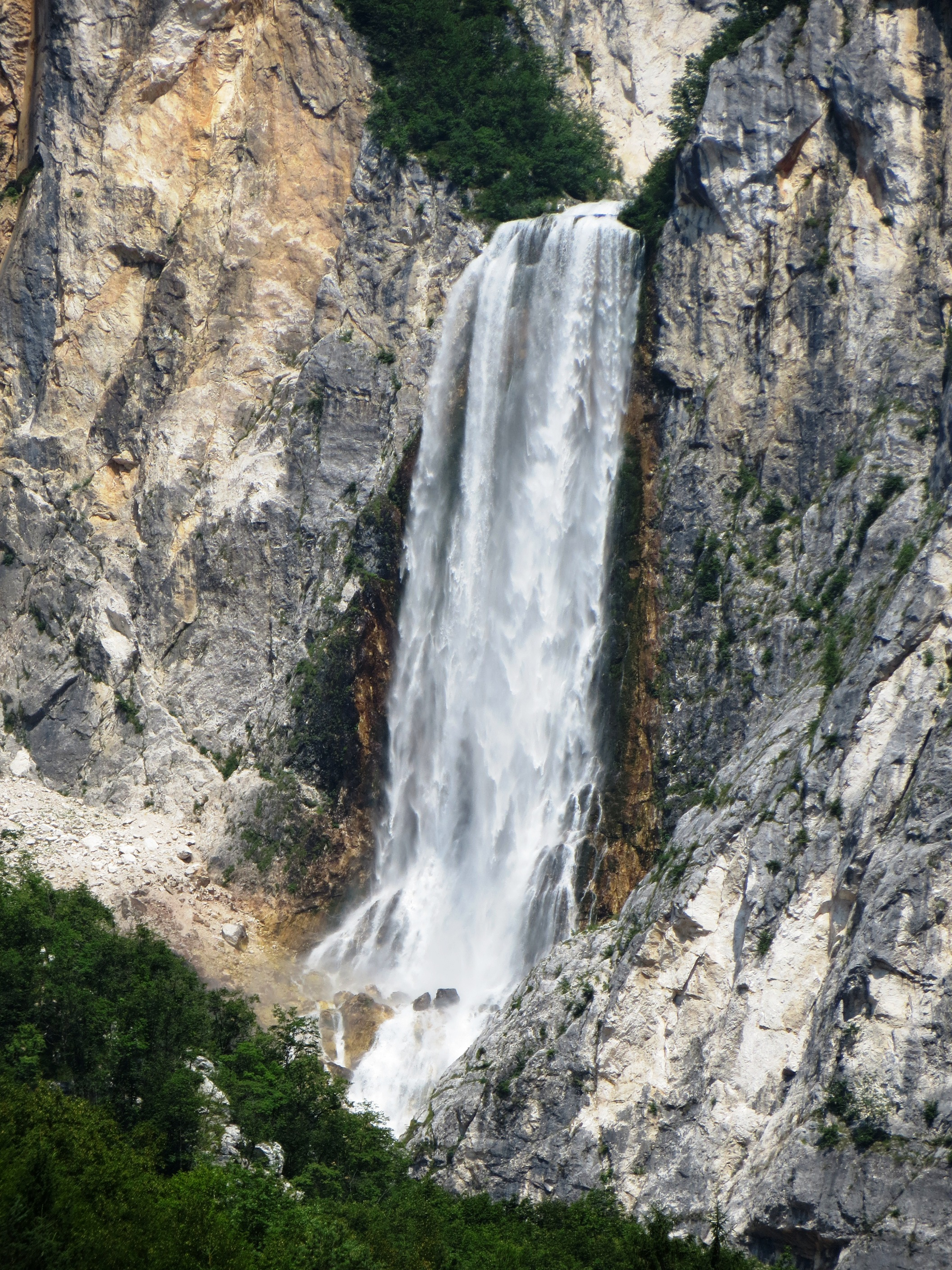
Boka Falls

Boka Falls is a waterfall on Boka Creek in the northeast part of the settlement. There are also two other waterfalls on Globoka Creek in the western part of the settlement.

== Notable people ==
Notable people that were born or lived in Žaga include:

- Oskar Hudales (1905–1968), writer, translator, and teacher
- Anton Ocvirk (1907–1980), literary historian
- Stane Žagar (1896–1942), communist activist and people's hero of Yugoslavia
