= Bavšica =

- Location in Slovenia
- Coordinates: 46°21′55.48″N 13°36′59.03″E
- Country: Slovenia
- Traditional region: Slovenian Littoral
- Statistical region: Gorizia
- Municipality: Bovec

Area
  - Total: 25.22 km^{2} (9.74 sq mi)
- Elevation: 697.6 m (2,289 ft)

Population (2020)
  - Total: 10
  - Density: 0.40/km^{2} (1.0/sq mi)

Bavšica (pronounced [ˈbaːu̯ʃitsa]; Italian: Bausizza) is a dispersed settlement in the Municipality of Bovec in the Littoral region of Slovenia.

== Geography ==
Bavšica lies in a glacial valley below Mount Bavšica Grintovec (Slovene: Bavški Grintavec) in the Julian Alps to the east and the Log Cliff (Slovene: Loška stena, Italian: Parete di Bretto) to the north. The valley also hosts the Bavšica Hiking Training Center (Slovene: Planinsko učno središče Bavšica) (PUS Bavšica), the main educational center of the Alpine Association of Slovenia.

== Name ==
Bavšica was attested in written sources in 1763–87 as Bauschiza. The name is derived from the Slovene common noun balha (dialect bau̯ha) 'matgrass', referring to the local vegetation. A less likely explanation is that the name is derived from the adjective *balh 'whitish, pale'.
