= Strmec na Predelu =

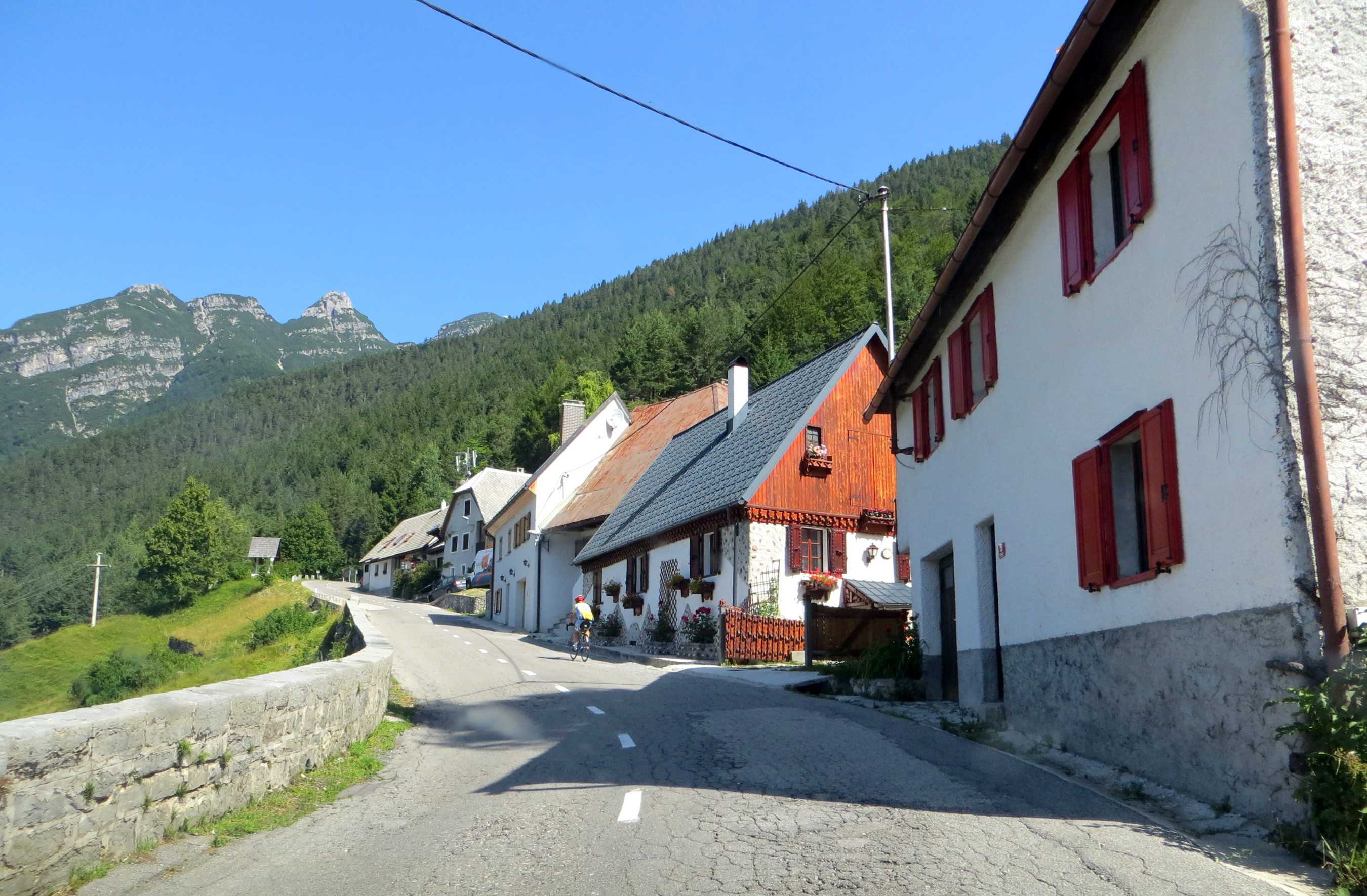

- Location in Slovenia
- Coordinates: 46°24′55.88″N 13°36′33.83″E
- Country: Slovenia
- Traditional region: Slovenian Littoral
- Statistical region: Gorizia
- Municipality: Bovec

Area
  - Total: 12.04 km^{2} (4.65 sq mi)
- Elevation: 955.1 m (3,134 ft)

Population (2020)
  - Total: 9
  - Density: 0.75/km^{2} (1.9/sq mi)

Strmec na Predelu (pronounced [ˈstəɾməts na pɾɛˈdeːlu]; Italian: Bretto di Sopra) is a settlement in the Municipality of Bovec in the Littoral region of Slovenia. It lies on the road to the Predel Pass. Another road, distinguished by being the road built at the highest elevation in Slovenia, splits off the road to Predel and leads to the lodge on Mangart Saddle.

World War Two came to Strmec in 1943 when Germans accused the town of supporting partisans in the region. German soldiers killed 16 men in the town then burned down the village.
