= Trenta, Bovec =

Trenta
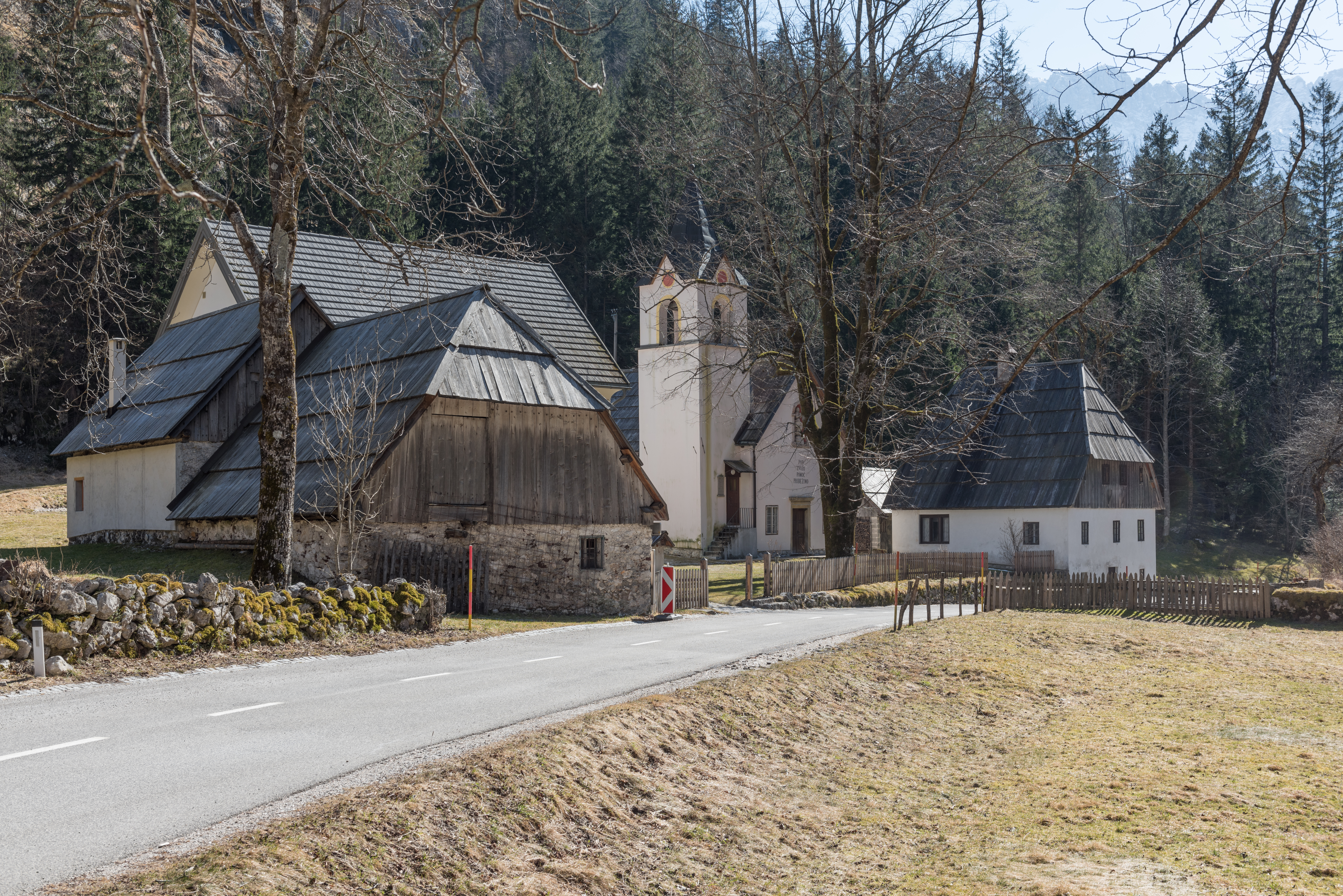
- Our Lady of Loreto Church

- Location in Slovenia
- Coordinates: 46°22′52.27″N 13°45′13.16″E
- Country: Slovenia
- Traditional region: Slovenian Littoral
- Statistical region: Gorizia
- Municipality: Bovec

Area
  - Total: 92.87 km^{2} (35.86 sq mi)
- Elevation: 624.2 m (2,048 ft)

Population (2020)
  - Total: 116
  - Density: 1.25/km^{2} (3.24/sq mi)

Trenta (pronounced [ˈtɾeːnta]) is a settlement in the Municipality of Bovec in the traditional Gorizia region in western Slovenia.

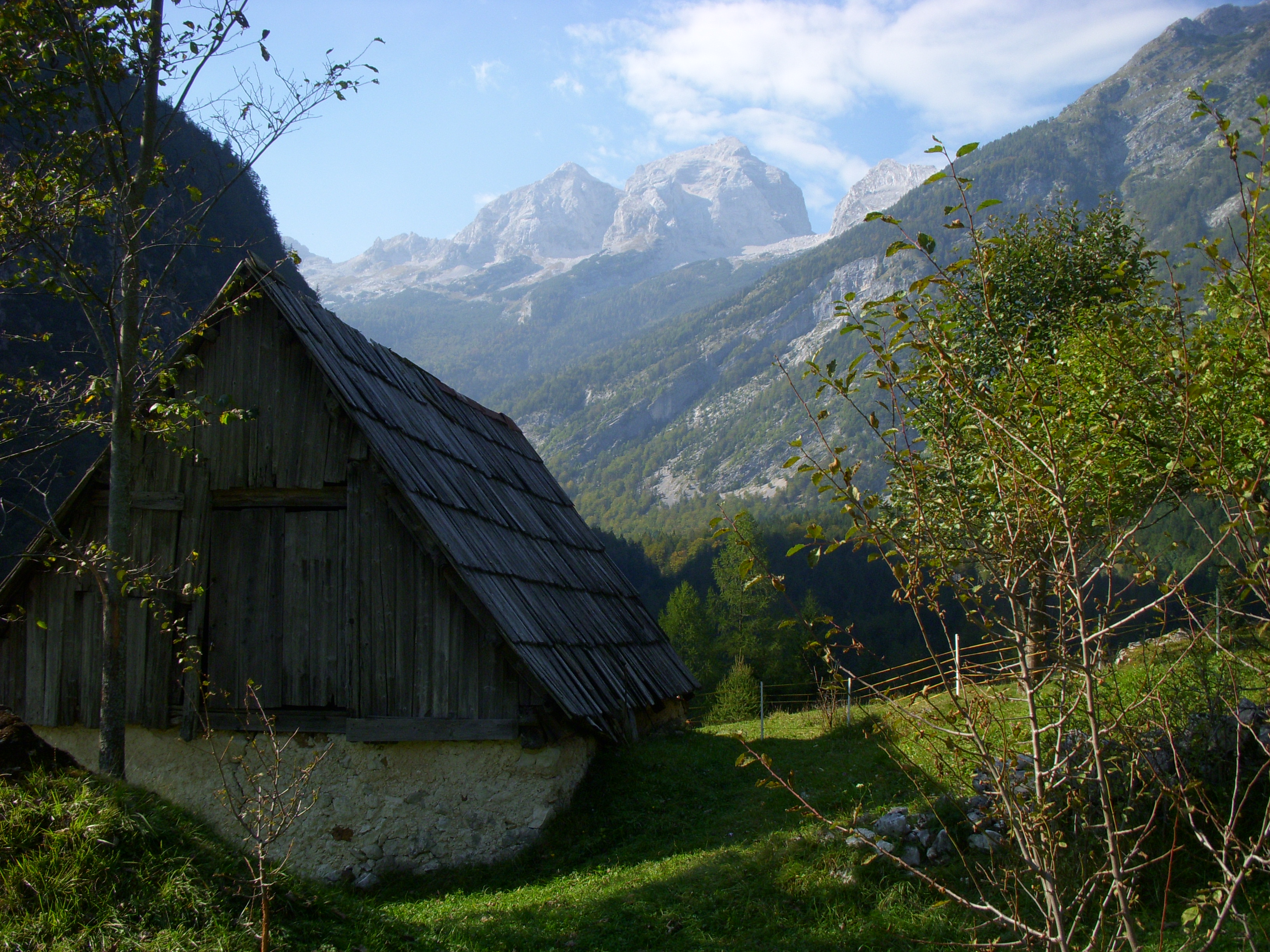
The Trenta Valley

It lies on the upper Soča River in the Gorizia region, the northern part of the Slovene Littoral, along the road from Bovec up to Vršič Pass. It encompasses the Trenta Valley and its side valleys within the Julian Alps, all part of Triglav National Park.

In the Middle Ages, the area south of the pass was ruled by the Patriarchs of Aquileia, later by the Republic of Venice, until the estates were incorporated into the Inner Austrian lands under the Habsburg emperor Maximilian I in 1509 and ruled within the Princely County of Gorizia and Gradisca. Trenta itself was settled in the 14th century; ironworks were documented in 1579.

A miners' church, dedicated to the Virgin Mary of Loreto, stands above the village on the way to Vršič Pass. It was erected in 1690 by the owners of the Trenta bloomeries, the Counts of Attems.

The Trenta Lodge information center of Triglav National Park and the Juliana Alpine Botanical Garden are located in Trenta.
