= Boka (waterfall) =

Coordinates: 46.321007°N 13.4814164°E

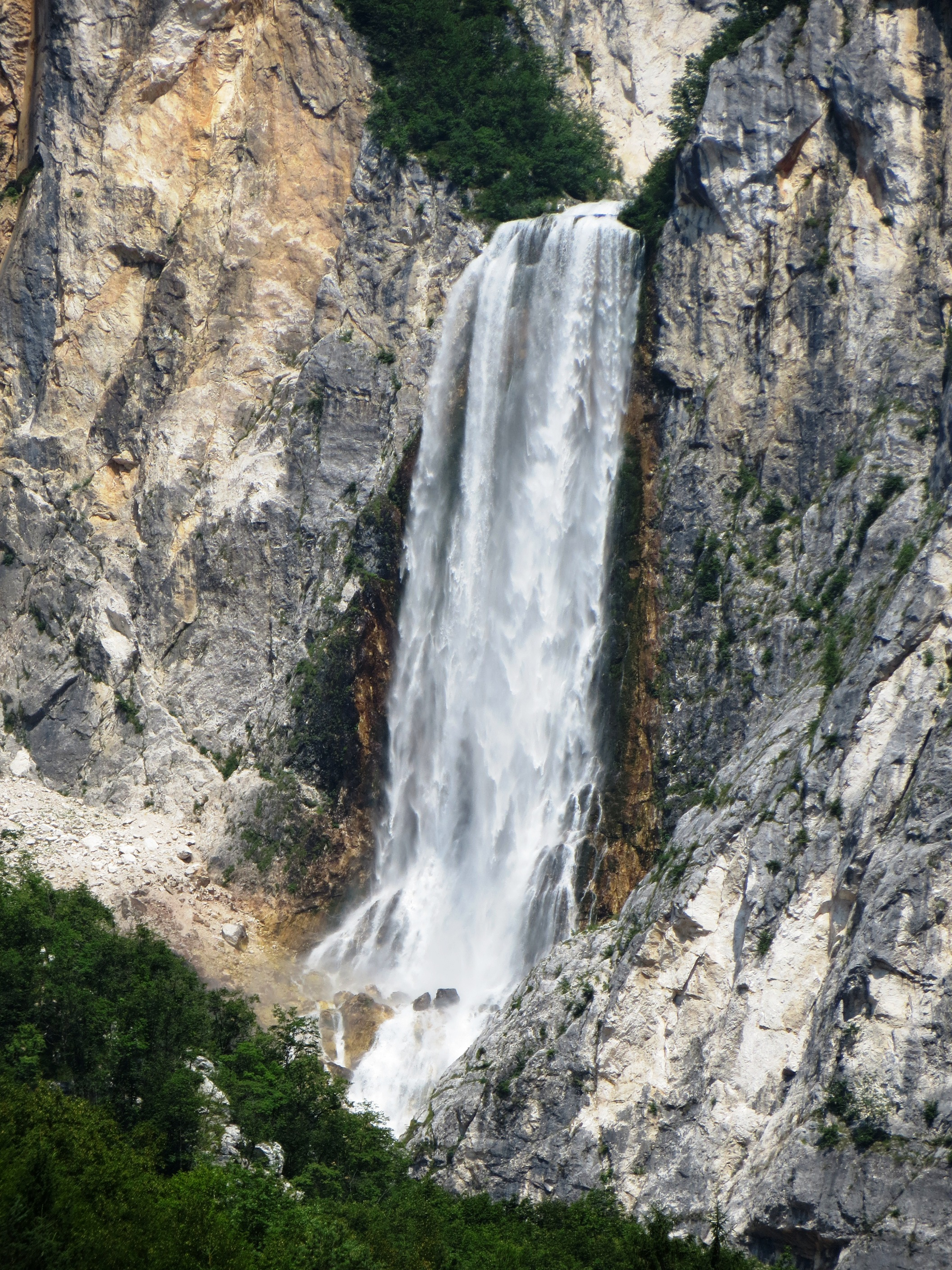
Boka Falls

Boka is a waterfall in the western part of Slovenia, near the Soča River. It begins at a karst spring and has two stages, of which the first is 106 meters (348 ft) high and 18 meters (59 ft) wide, and the second is 33 meters (108 ft) high.

== Overview ==
The waterfall is supplied by a karst spring under an almost vertical limestone wall. Because of its karst nature, the spring has a relatively large discharge due to its underground drainage in the mountains of Kanin. During the driest periods, water flux is around 2 cubic meters per second (71 cu ft/s), and reaches up to 100 cubic meters per second (3,500 cu ft/s) after extensive rains. The stream (also called Boka) flows for about 30 meters (98 ft) over a rocky shelf before falling over the rocks as a spectacular waterfall. This happens in two not so clearly separated stages, of which the upper one has a height of 106 meters (348 ft), and the lower one 33 meters (108 ft). The width of the two stages is around 18 meters (59 ft).

Below the waterfall, Boka Creek flows over a steep valley with stony bottom and empties into the Soča River after less than 1 kilometer (0.62 mi), which makes it one of the shortest streams in Slovenia.

== Access ==
The waterfall is located on the right bank of the Soča River, about 1.3 kilometers (0.81 mi) from the river. The starting point to visit the waterfall is on the regional road between Kobarid and Bovec, about 2.2 kilometers (1.4 mi) upstream from the village of Žaga or 6.1 kilometers (3.8 mi) downstream from the town of Bovec. The waterfall is visible from this road, especially its upper part. Next to the road and Boka Creek, there is a parking lot, and a gravel road leads uphill towards the waterfall. After about 100 meters (330 ft), this road splits into path over the stream on the left, which transitions to a secured climbing path leading to the source of the waterfall, and into the path on the right that leads to the waterfall.

== See also ==
- List of waterfalls
