= Lepena, Slovenia =

Lepena
- Location in Slovenia
- Coordinates: 46°18′48.81″N 13°39′9.43″E
- Country: Slovenia
- Traditional region: Slovenian Littoral
- Statistical region: Gorizia
- Municipality: Bovec

Area
  - Total: 18.52 km^{2} (7.15 sq mi)
- Elevation: 514.9 m (1,689 ft)

Population (2025)
  - Total: 47
  - Density: 2.5/km^{2} (6.6/sq mi)

Lepena (pronounced [lɛˈpeːna]; Italian: Lepegna) is a dispersed settlement in the Municipality of Bovec in the Littoral region of Slovenia. It lies in the valley of Lepenjica Creek, a tributary of the Soča River. The Klement Jug Lodge at the end of the valley is a popular starting point with hikers for trips to the surrounding peaks in the Julian Alps.
