= Resia, Friuli Venezia Giulia =

Resia Reśija (Slovene)
- Comune
- Comune di Resia
- Location within Italy Location within Friuli-Venezia Giulia
- Coordinates: 46°23′N 13°18′E
- Country: Italy
- Region: Friuli-Venezia Giulia
- Province: Udine (UD)
- Frazioni: Prato, San Giorgio, Gniva, Oseacco and Stolvizza

Government
  - Mayor: Sergio Chinese (Civic Party)

Area
  - Total: 119.0 km^{2} (45.9 sq mi)
- Elevation: 492 m (1,614 ft)

Population (Jan. 2026)
  - Total: 904
  - Density: 7.60/km^{2} (19.7/sq mi)
- Demonym: Resiani
- Time zone: UTC+1 (CET)
  - Summer (DST): UTC+2 (CEST)
- Postal code: 33010
- Dialing code: 0433
- Patron saint: Assumption of Mary
- Saint day: August 15
- Website: Comune di Resia

Resia (Resian: Reśija; Slovene: Rezija; Friulian: Resie) is a comune (municipality) in the Regional decentralization entity of Udine, in the Friuli-Venezia Giulia region of northeast Italy, bordering on the municipalities of Chiusaforte, Lusevera, Resiutta, and Venzone, and also on two of the Slovenian municipalities (Kobarid and Bovec). Its residents speak an archaic dialect known as Resian, which is – according to most linguists – a transitional dialect between the Carinthian and Littoral dialects of Slovene. Although they maintain their own traditional system of family names, which are of Slavic origin, the people of Resia have either Italian or Italianized surnames, similarly to some areas in Venetian Slovenia.

It is located in the alpine valley of the same name in the Julian Alps, about 90 kilometres (56 mi) northwest of Trieste and about 35 kilometres (22 mi) north of Udine, on the border with Slovenia and around 20 kilometres (12 mi) from the border with Austria. As of 1 January 2015, it had a population of 1,048 and an area of 119.0 square kilometres (45.9 mi^{2}).

== Geographical location ==
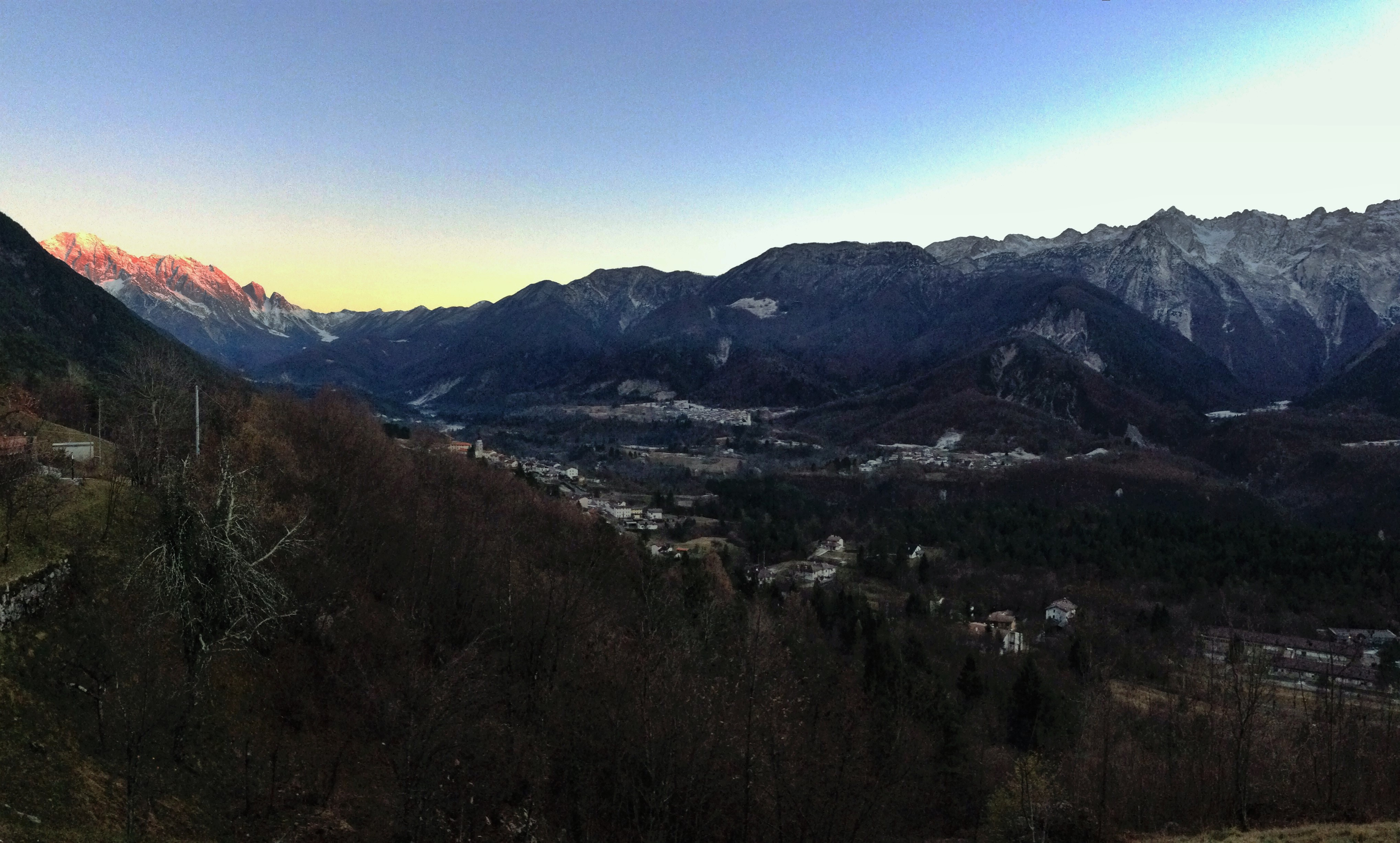
The Resia Valley

The municipality comprises the Resia Valley, a typical Alpine glacial valley, surrounded by high mountains of the Julian Alps, with a narrow opening towards the west. The valley is located on the western edge of a high mountain range of the Julian Alps. To the east, it is closed by the Kanin mountain group also of the Julian Alps, which separates it from the Soča valley in the Slovenian Littoral. To the west, the valley opens towards the Fella valley, which leads to the upper Friulian plain. This is the most usual way to access this isolated valley.

To the south-east of the Resia Valley, there is a narrow mountain pass, called Carnizza (Slovene: Karnica), leading from Resia Valley to the upper Torre Valley (Slovene: Terska dolina). The same mountain pass also leads to the Učja Canyon (Uccea), which ends in the Soča valley near the Slovenian village of Žaga. For centuries, this narrow pass was the only way connecting the Resia Valley with Venetian Slovenia and the Slovene Lands.

== Language and traditions ==
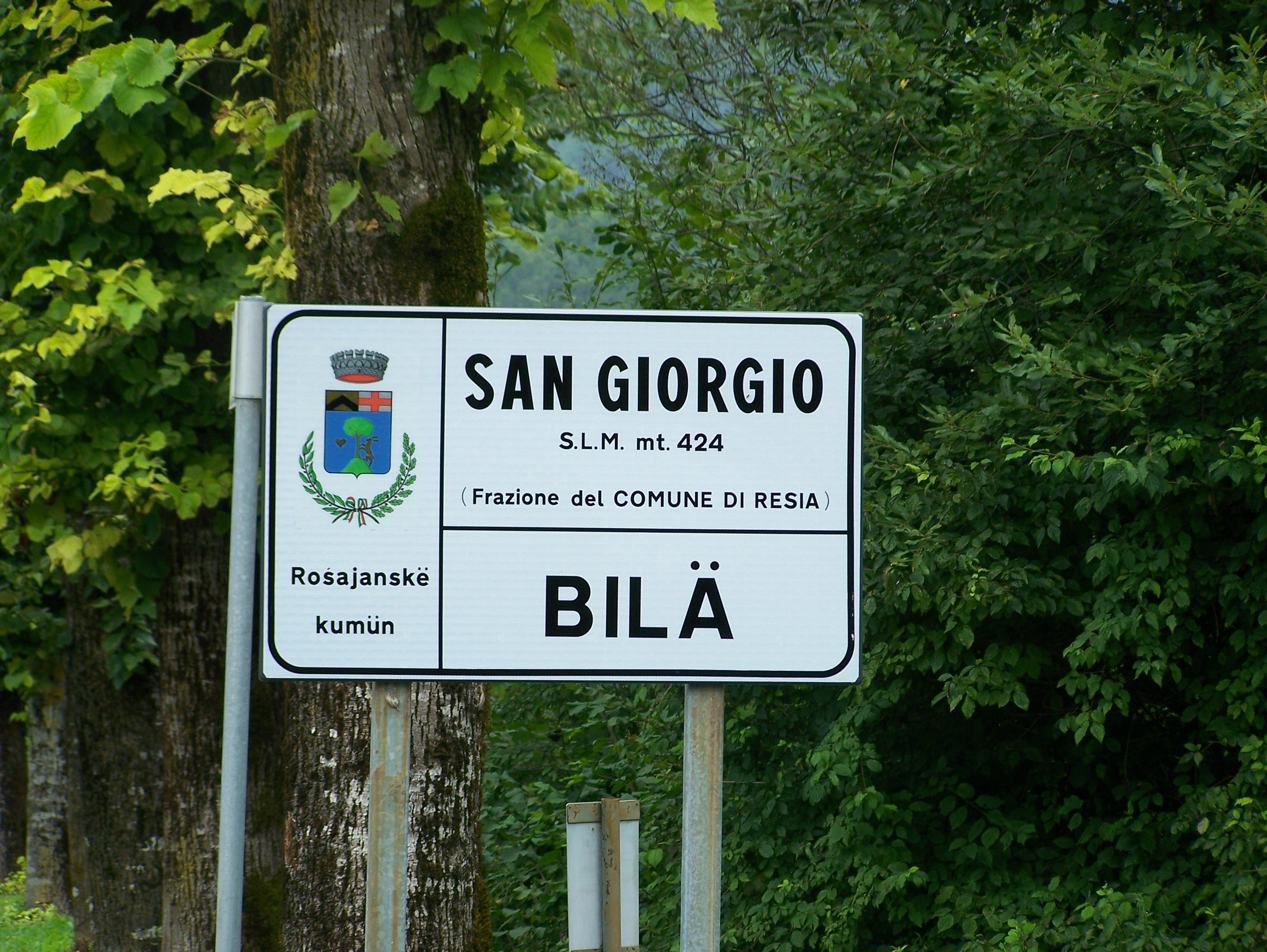
An official bilingual sign in Italian and Resian dialect

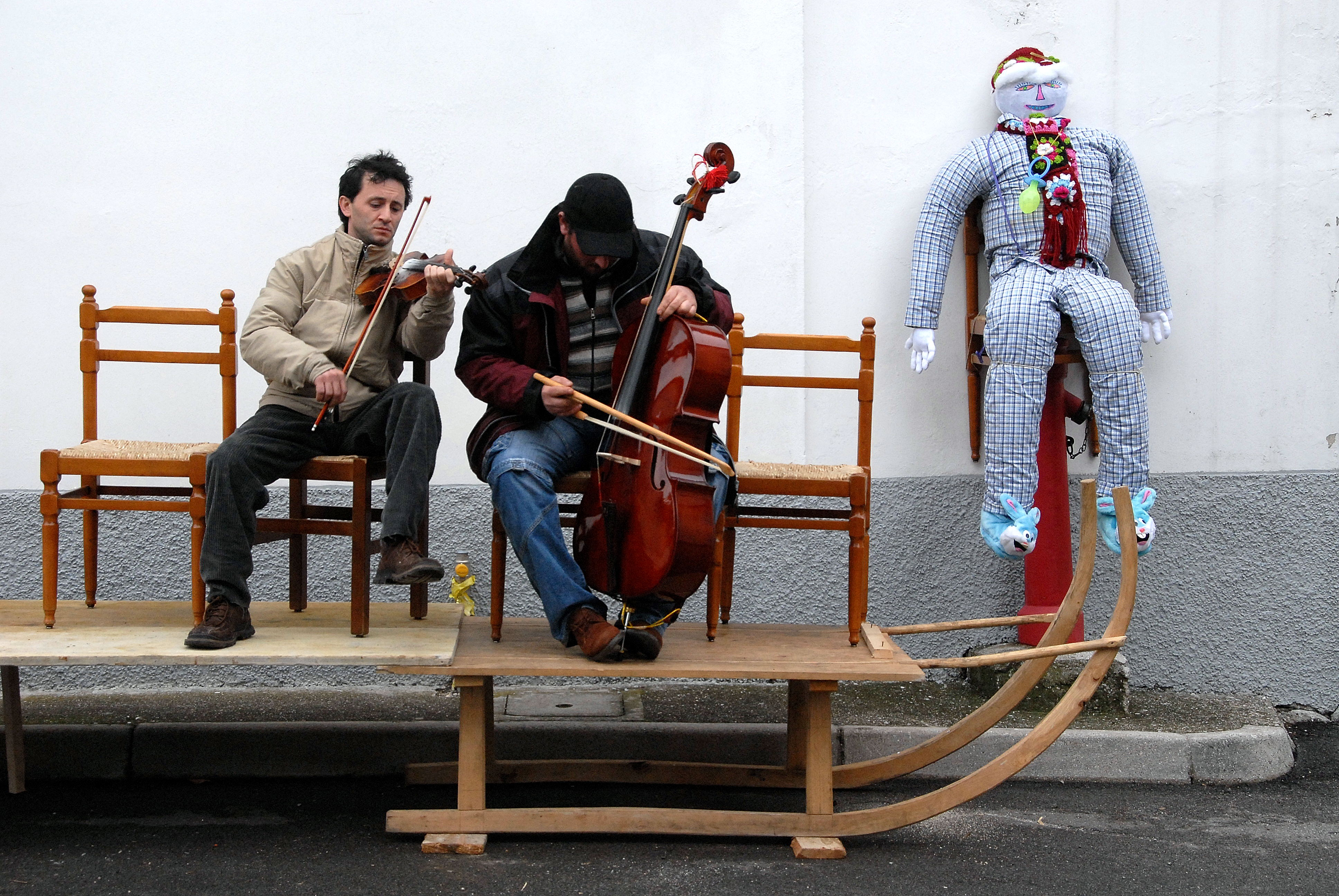
The carnival in Resia

The inhabitants of Resia speak a unique dialect, known as the Resian. According to the dialectologist Tine Logar, Resian is a transitory dialect between the Carinthian and Littoral dialects of Slovene. Resian maintains several archaic features that have been lost in most other Slovene dialects. Due to its isolation, the dialect has also developed a specific phonetic system, unlike any other in the South Slavic language group. In 1994, the linguist Han Steenwijk published the orthography of the Resian, in 1999 the first part of its reference grammar, and in 2005 a small orthographic dictionary.

The people of Resia have conflicting opinions on whether they consider themselves Slovenes although they maintain close cultural, economic and family connections with the people of the historical region known as Slavia Friulana, where Slovene linguistic and cultural identity is much more rooted. The Resians call their dialect rozajanski, while they frequently refer to the dialect of Bovec, which is the first large Slovene settlement on the other side of the Kanin mountain range, as tabuški, meaning 'the one from Bovec'.

Since 2007, the Resia has been included in those municipalities where the Law on the Protection of the Slovene Linguistic Community is to be applied. Many bilingual signs have been erected in the valley since the early 2000s.

The Resian people are known for their rich folkloric traditions, especially their music and dances. Many Slovenian folk and folk rock groups, such as Katalena and Terrafolk, have drawn their inspiration from the Resian folk tradition. Resian folklore is also renowned for its fables, which have been extensively collected, translated into standard Slovene and published in various Slovenian publications since the late 19th century. With more than 400 different folk stories told, Resian Slovenian peddler and a folk storyteller Valentina Pielich - Tina Vajtova (also Tina Vajtawa) is considered one of the best folk storytellers of Resian fairy tales.

== Cultural associations ==
Since the 1990s, several cultural institutions have been set up to promote the historical and cultural heritage of the valley. The most important is the Cultural Association 'Resian Home' (Te kultürski čirkolo "Rozajanski Dum", Italian: Circolo culturale resiano "Rozajanski dum", standard Slovene: Kulturno društvo "Rezijanski dom"), founded in 1983 to foster and protect the local culture. In the 1990s, the 'Resian Cultural Centre' (Ta Rozajanska Kultürska Hïša, Italian: Centro Culturale Resiano, standard Slovene: Rezijanski kulturni dom) was established as the central cultural venue in the valley. Both associations are fully included in the network of cultural associations of the Slovene minority in Italy.

== Identity disputes and minority rights ==
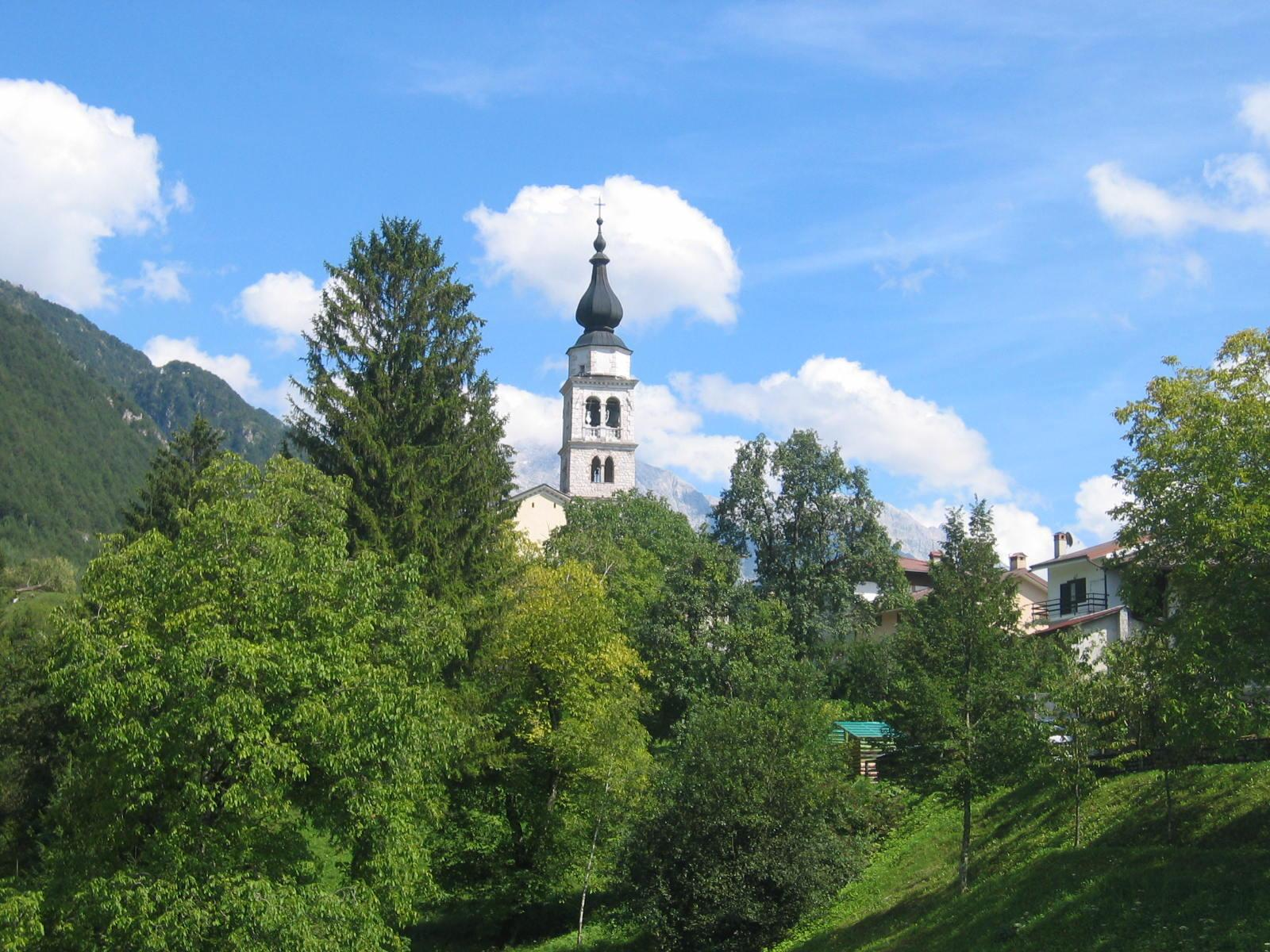
Prato di Resia - Ravanca

The political and public sphere in the valley is highly divided between those who understand the Resian identity in the frame of the Slovene minority in Italy, and those who oppose this identification and refuse to be considered part of the Slovene people. While the majority of the Resian cultural associations are integrated in the network of the Slovene minority in Italy, there are also political movements rejecting the identification of Resians with Slovenes.

The majority of the population does not consider itself Slovene. In 2004, 1,014 out of 1,285 (78.9%) inhabitants of Resia signed a petition declaring that they are not Slovenes.

In January 2009 the mayor of the Resia municipality, Sergio Barbarino, who is not a Resian, filed an official demand that Resia be included among the municipalities in which the Italian–Slovene bilingualism is applied. The subsequent mayor Sergio Chinese – himself a native of Resia – declared that "Resia and the Resians have nothing in common with the Slovenes" and that the Resian language "has nothing to do with Slovene". He requested that Resia be removed from the list of municipalities where Italian–Slovene bilingualism is applied.

In February 2010, the new municipal administration of Resia replaced the bilingual Italian–Resian road signs with new ones, in which the Resian place names were written in the Italian orthography instead of the scholarly accepted New Resian orthography. The Slovenian Foreign Ministry denounced the incident and brought it to the attention of the international community as an evidence of the institutional subversion of minority rights in Italy.

In March 2010, the Italian Ministry of Interior confirmed that Resia is to be considered part of the bilingual Italian-Slovene territory and that linguistic rights guaranteed by the Italian Act for the Protection of the Slovene Minority are to be fully applied in Resia. In August 2010, the municipal assembly of Resia asked for the removal of Resia from the list of municipalities, in which the Law for the Protection of the Slovene Linguistic Community is enforced. However, such removal is not possible according to the law.

== Demographic evolution ==
Historical population

| Year | Pop. | ±% |
|---|---|---|
| 1871 | 3,275 | — |
| 1881 | 3,703 | +13.1% |
| 1901 | 3,952 | +6.7% |
| 1911 | 4,671 | +18.2% |
| 1921 | 3,695 | −20.9% |

| Year | Pop. | ±% |
|---|---|---|
| 1931 | 3,114 | −15.7% |
| 1936 | 2,994 | −3.9% |
| 1951 | 3,350 | +11.9% |
| 1961 | 2,830 | −15.5% |
| 1971 | 1,805 | −36.2% |

| Year | Pop. | ±% |
|---|---|---|
| 1981 | 1,547 | −14.3% |
| 1991 | 1,318 | −14.8% |
| 2001 | 1,285 | −2.5% |
| 2011 | 1,064 | −17.2% |
| 2014 | 1,048 | −1.5% |

Source: Data from ISTAT

== Twin towns ==
Resia is twinned with:

- Fryazino, Russia

== Notable natives and residents ==
- Jan Niecisław Baudouin de Courtenay, Polish linguist, who lived in Resia studying the Resian dialect
- Valentina Pielich - Tina Vajtova (also Tina Vajtawa), (1900–1984), Resian Slovenian peddler and a folk storyteller of Resian fairy tales
