= Plužna =

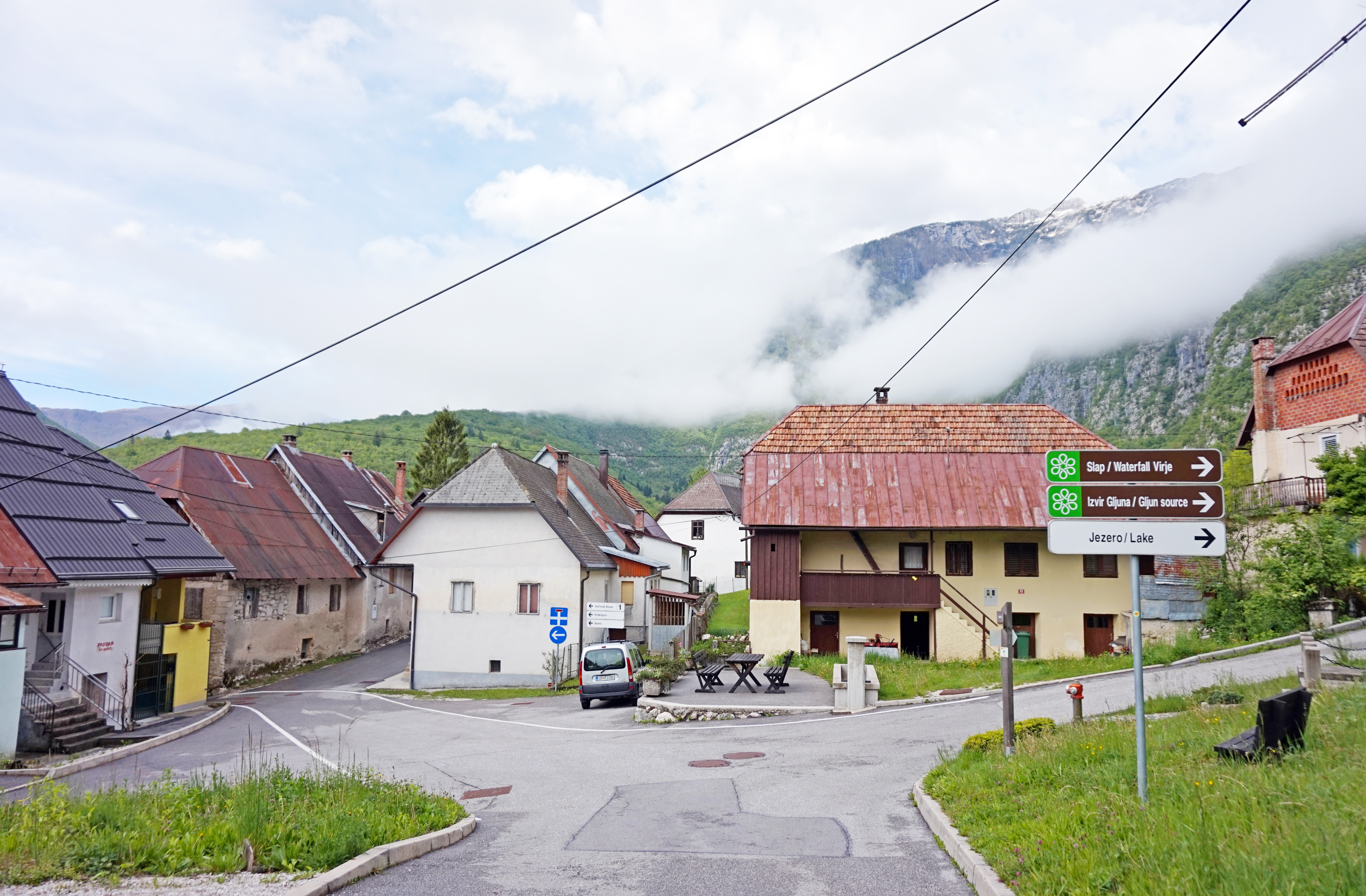

- Location in Slovenia
- Coordinates: 46°20′10.68″N 13°31′10.43″E
- Country: Slovenia
- Traditional region: Slovenian Littoral
- Statistical region: Gorizia
- Municipality: Bovec

Area
  - Total: 32.43 km^{2} (12.52 sq mi)
- Elevation: 452 m (1,483 ft)

Population (2020)
  - Total: 49
  - Density: 1.5/km^{2} (3.9/sq mi)

Plužna (pronounced [ˈpluːʒna]) is a settlement in the Municipality of Bovec in the Littoral region of Slovenia.

== Geography ==
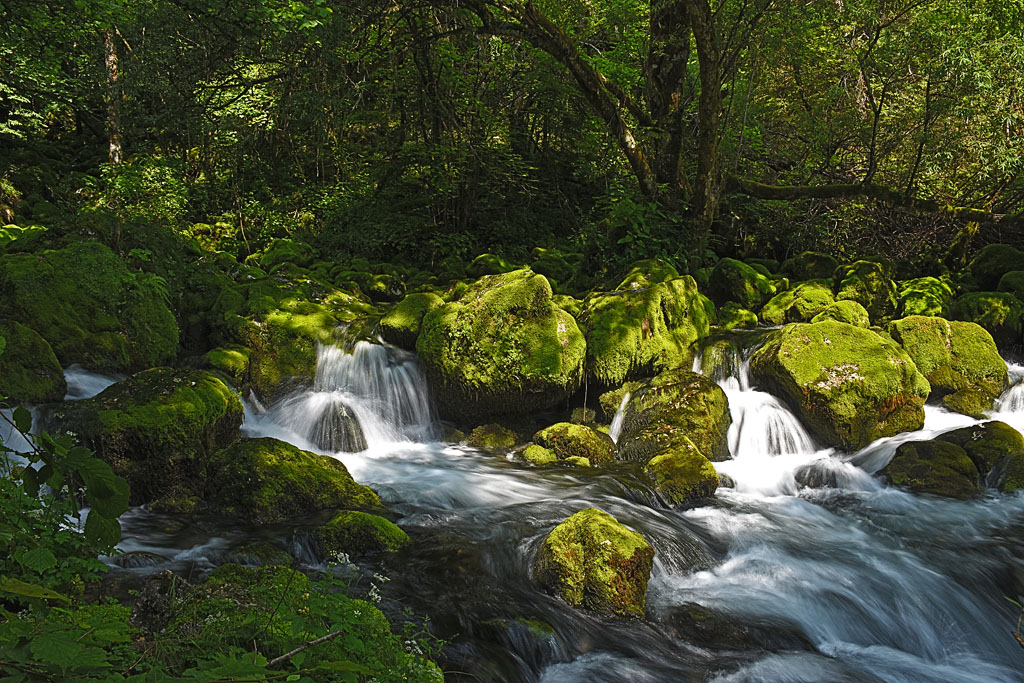
Source of Glijun Creek

The source of Glijun Creek is located in Plužna, about 720 meters (2,360 ft) west of the village center. Most of the slopes of the Kanin Ski Resort are located around and above Plužna.

== Church ==
The church in the village is dedicated to Saint Nicholas.
