= Svinjak =

Mountain in Slovenia

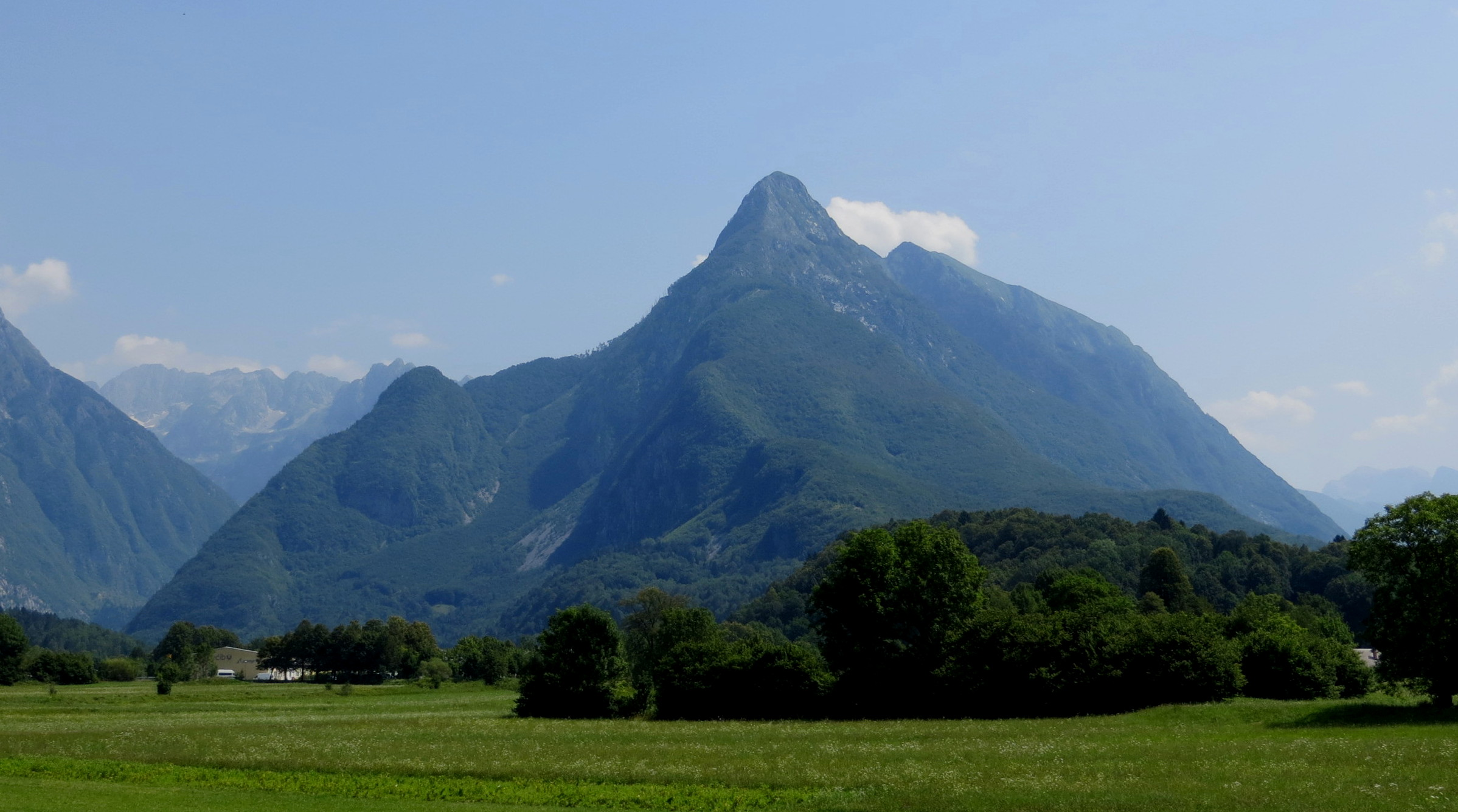
- Mount Svinjak seen from Bovec

Highest point
- Elevation: 1,653 m (5,423 ft)
- Coordinates: 46°21′1.66″N 13°36′38.94″E

Geography
- Location: Slovenia
- Parent range: Julian Alps

Mount Svinjak (pronounced [sʋiˈnjaːk]) is a 1,653-meter (5,423 ft) mountain in northwestern Slovenia in the Julian Alps. It stands east-northeast of Bovec.

The name of the mountain is derived from *Svitnjak 'shining one' (< svit 'dawn; light, shining') because it is illuminated by the rising sun when viewed from Bovec. The resemblance to the common noun svinjak (with various meanings: 'pigsty', 'pig dung'; 'cat's ear') is coincidental.
