= Plužná =

- Municipality
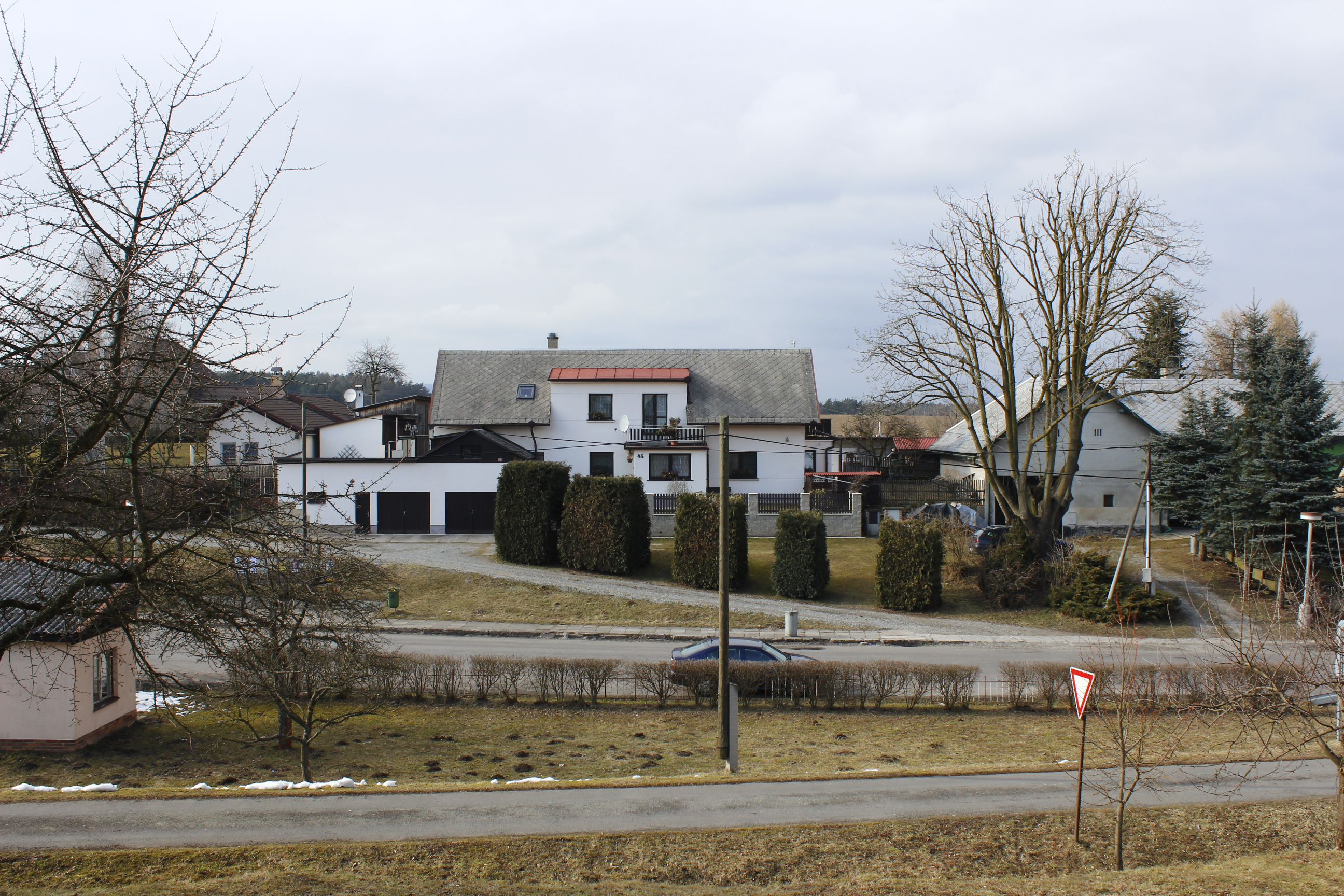
- Centre of Plužná

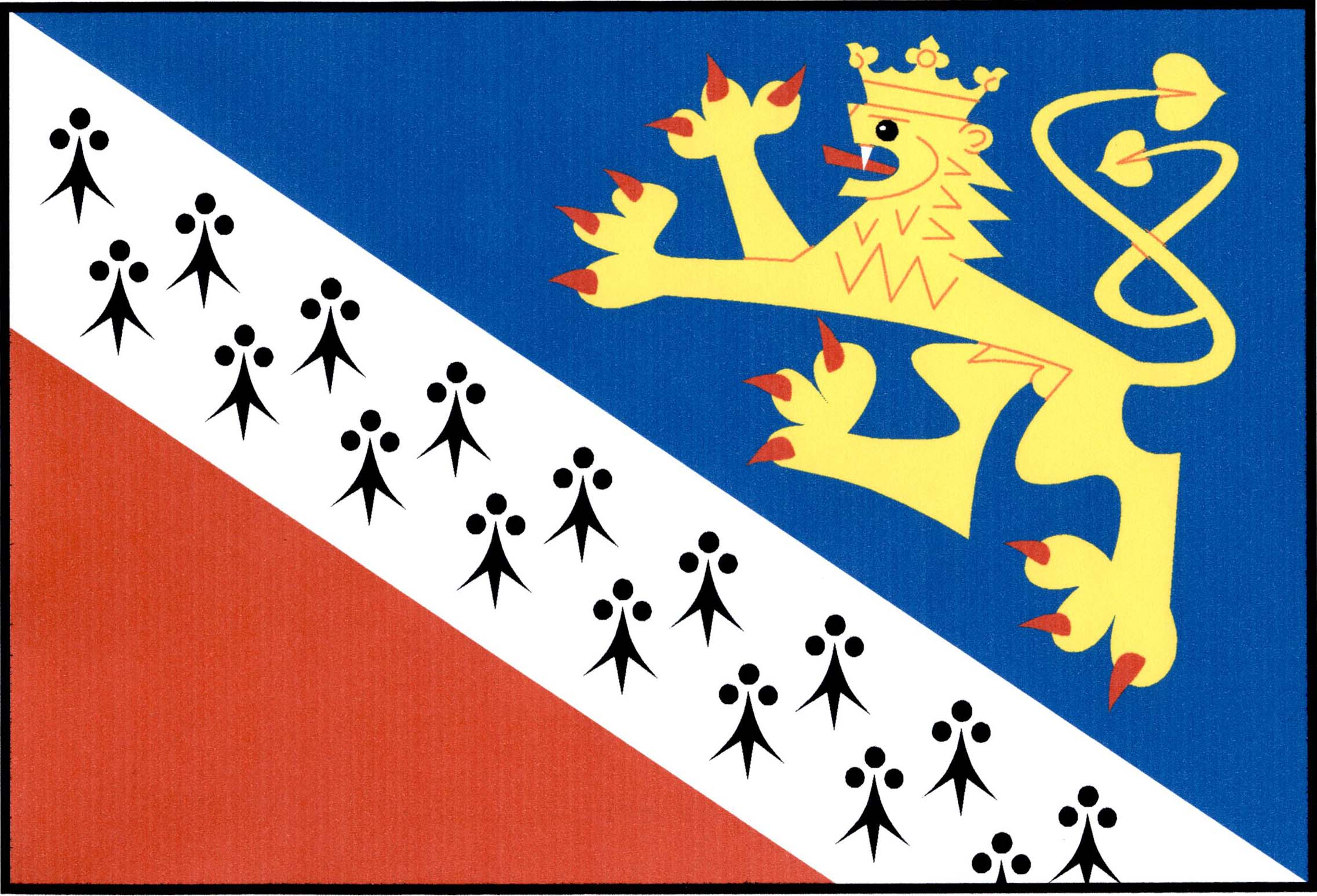
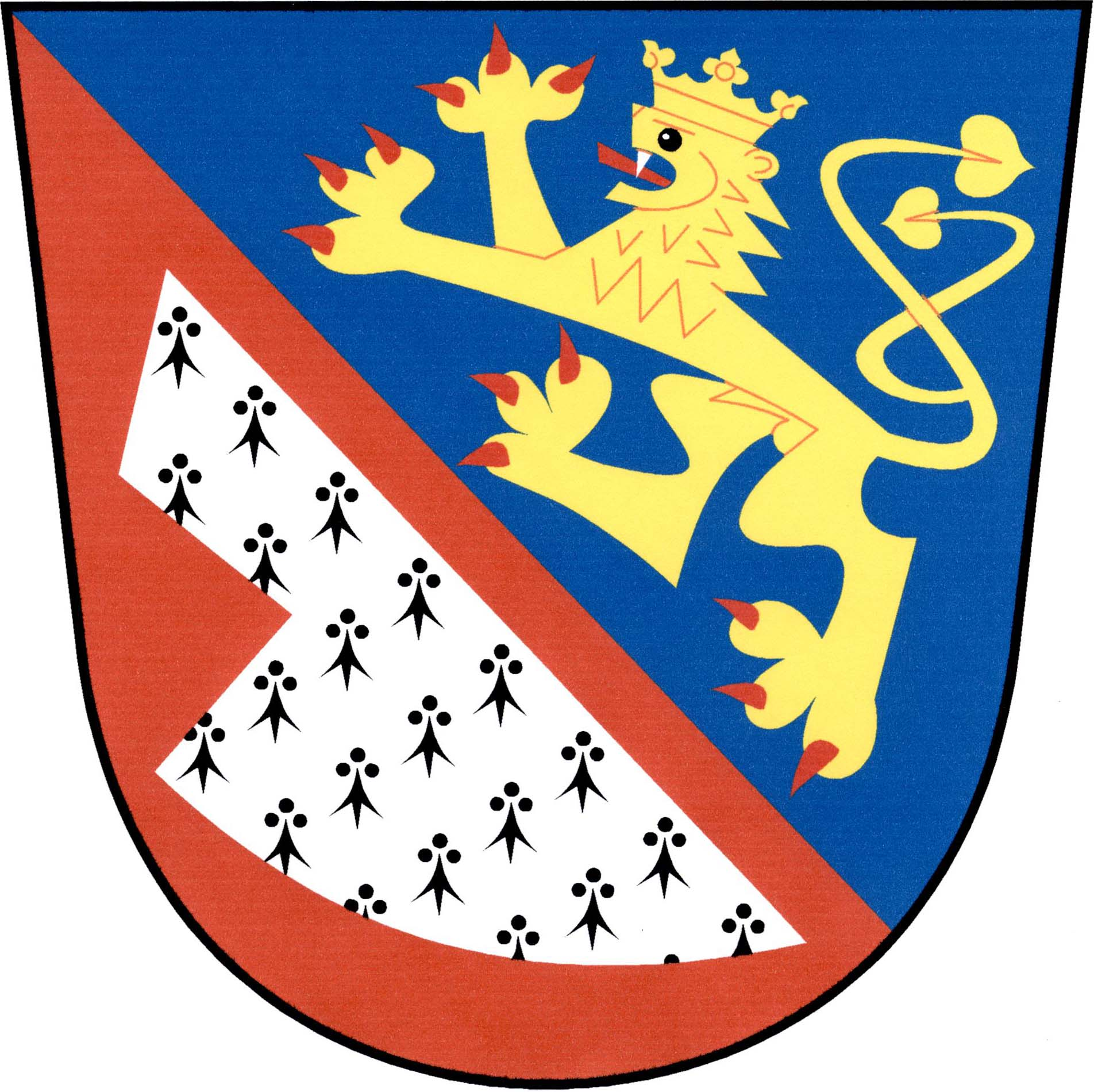
- Flag Coat of arms

- Location in the Czech Republic
- Coordinates: 50°28′26″N 14°48′15″E
- Country: Czech Republic
- Region: Central Bohemian
- District: Mladá Boleslav
- First mentioned: 1337

Area
  - Total: 5.54 km^{2} (2.14 sq mi)
- Elevation: 301 m (988 ft)

Population (2026-01-01)
  - Total: 281
  - Density: 50.7/km^{2} (131/sq mi)
- Time zone: UTC+1 (CET)
  - Summer (DST): UTC+2 (CEST)
- Postal code: 294 23
- Website: www.pluzna.cz

Plužná is a municipality and village in Mladá Boleslav District in the Central Bohemian Region of the Czech Republic. It has about 300 inhabitants.

== Demographics ==
Historical population
Year	Pop.	±%
1869	297	—
1880	273	−8.1%
1890	302	+10.6%
1900	260	−13.9%
1910	307	+18.1%
1921	313	+2.0%
1930	283	−9.6%
1950	221	−21.9%
1961	215	−2.7%
1970	197	−8.4%
1980	185	−6.1%
1991	183	−1.1%
2001	188	+2.7%
2011	237	+26.1%
2021	257	+8.4%
Source: Censuses
