= Ferdo Kravanja =

Slovenian partisan

Ferdo Kravanja Peter Skalar
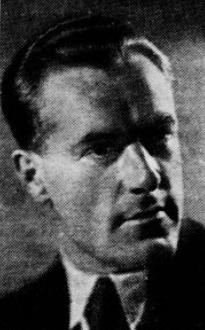
- Image of Kravanja
- Born: 10 August 1912; Čezsoča, Austro Hungarian Empire
- Died: 10 October 1944 (aged 32); Paljevo, Kingdom of Italy
- Burial place: Čezsoča, Republic of Slovenia
- Military career
- Allegiance: TIGR; Royal Italian Army (Penal military unit); Liberation Front of the Slovene Nation; Kobarid Republic
- Known for: Founder of the Kobarid Republic and fighter in the first recorded clash between Slovene partisans and the Axis Powers

Ferdo Kravanja, (10 August 1912 – 10 October 1944) also known by his partisan name Peter Skalar) was a member of the TIGR partisan organization in the Kingdom of Italy, partisan and organizer of the Yugoslav and Slovene liberation struggle in the Tolmin region and founder of the Kobarid Republic, which laid the foundation of the idea of a united and democratic Slovenia.

== Biography ==
=== Early life and political activation ===
Ferdo Kravanja was born into a farming family and completed his primary education in his hometown, Čezsoča. While working in agriculture and manual labor, he was recruited by his teacher Franc Sivec into an underground anti-fascist cell. Sivec trained several young anti-fascist activists in the area, including Kravanja, Ivan Ivančič, Franc Kavs, Edi Mlekuž, Leopold Čopi, and Ivan Šuler. On April 18, 1931, Kravanja and Ivančič set fire to the primary schools in Bovec and Čezsoča in protest against the execution of the "Bazovica victims" (Ferdo Bidovec, Zvonimir Miloš, Fran Marušič, and Alojz Valenčič). Simultaneous attempts to burn schools in Plužna and Log pod Mangartom failed.

=== Underground activity with TIGR ===
In mid-1931, Andrej Čopi facilitated a meeting near Jalovec between Kravanja, Franc Kavs, and TIGR leaders Danilo Zelen and Berti Rejc. Following this meeting, the Čezsoča group began receiving anti-fascist literature and weapons from the Kingdom of Yugoslavia and undertook firearms training. Kravanja routinely crossed the Italian-Yugoslav border at Bogatin and Rateče to coordinate operations with TIGR leadership in Ljubljana and Jesenice. On February 24, 1933, Italian authorities arrested Kravanja in Bela Peča. He was sent to Rome to perform his compulsory military service in the Royal Italian Army and was released on August 27, 1934. Upon his return, he resumed underground anti-fascist operations. To avoid conscription for the Second Italo-Ethiopian War, Kravanja fled to the Kingdom of Yugoslavia on July 19, 1935. After residing in Jesenice and working for the Slograd company, he transitioned to forestry work to allow for greater mobility along the border. In this role, he participated in smuggling armaments and illegal propaganda across the frontier. He also assisted in planning a TIGR plot to assassinate Benito Mussolini during the Italian dictator's visit to Kobarid on September 29, 1938; the attempt, reportedly intended to be carried out by Franc Kavs, was ultimately aborted.

=== Arrest and escape ===
Following diplomatic pressure from Nazi Germany and the Kingdom of Italy, Yugoslav authorities arrested Kravanja. At a trial in Belgrade, he was sentenced to five years' imprisonment, serving his term in Sremska Mitrovica and Niš. Following the Axis invasion of Yugoslavia in April 1941, Kravanja escaped from prison and returned to Slovenia. He joined TIGR members Danilo Zelen and Anton Majnik, initially taking refuge near Pri Cerkvi-Struge before relocating to a forester's cabin on Mala Gora near Ribnica. On May 13, 1941, Italian Carabinieri surrounded the cabin, leading to the first ever armed clash between Slovenian anti-fascists and Axis forces during World War II. During the engagement, Zelen committed suicide to avoid capture, while Kravanja was wounded and taken into custody alongside Majnik (who later escaped). While hospitalized in Kočevje, Kravanja attempted to conceal his identity by posing as a Serbian-American named Djuro Jovanović. He was subsequently transferred to a hospital in Ljubljana, from where members of the Liberation Front of the Slovene Nation orchestrated his escape in October 1941, after which he went into hiding in the city.

=== Reprise partisanship ===
On May 26, 1942, Kravanja joined the Slovene Partisans in Dolenjska before transferring to the Primorska region. Beginning in August 1942, he served as a political activist for the Liberation Front of the Slovene Nation. During this period, he held administrative roles as the secretary of both the District Committee of the Communist Party of Slovenia and the District Committee of the Liberation Front for the Tolmin and Western Primorje districts, operating under the partisan nom de guerre "Peter Skalar." He led and founded the Kobarid Republic which was established on 10 September 1943 and administered by both Italian partisans and the Liberation Front of the Slovene Nation up until the fall of Kobarid on 1 November 1943. The short-lived republic was the first democratic experiment and the basis for the idea of a free and united Slovenia.

=== Death ===
While en route from Venetian Slovenia to attend a session of the Regional Committee of the Liberation Front in Lokve nad Gorico, Kravanja was shot in the head near the hamlet of Paljevo and died from his injuries. He was initially buried in Deskle before being reinterred in his hometown of Čezsoča after the war.

== Legacy ==
Following his death, in 1983, a mountain hut, the Dom Petra Skalarja na Kaninu, was named after him.
