= Republic of Caporetto =

Partisan republic during World War II

Republic of Caporetto Repubblica di Caporetto Kobariška republika
- Motto: "Kar je naše hočemo, druzega ne maramo. (Slovene)" (Note: Lovro Kuhar, a Slovenian realist writer and a committed communist activist who served as a high-ranking official within the Liberation Front of the Slovenian Nation, authored a 20-page political brochure in September 1942 titled O slovenskih mejah which explained what a liberated, unified post-war Slovenia should look like. To ground this territorial claim morally, he invoked the protective, non-aggressive principle: "Tujega nočem, svojega ne dam!", a different earlier version of the motto adopted by the Kobarid Republic and later by Yugoslav Partisans. See: "Historijski pogledi" (PDF). Časopis Historijski pogledi (in Slovenian).) "We want what is ours; we do not want what belongs to others."
- Largest city: Kobarid/Caporetto
- Recognised national languages: Italian language and Slovene language
- Ethnic groups: Italian people; Slovene people; Friulian people
- Government: Popular democracy
  - Founder: Ferdo Kravanja
- History
  - Established: 10 September 1943
  - Dissolved: 1 November 1943

Area
  - Total: 2,750 km^{2} (1,060 sq mi)

Population
  - Estimate: 100,000
- Currency: Italian lira

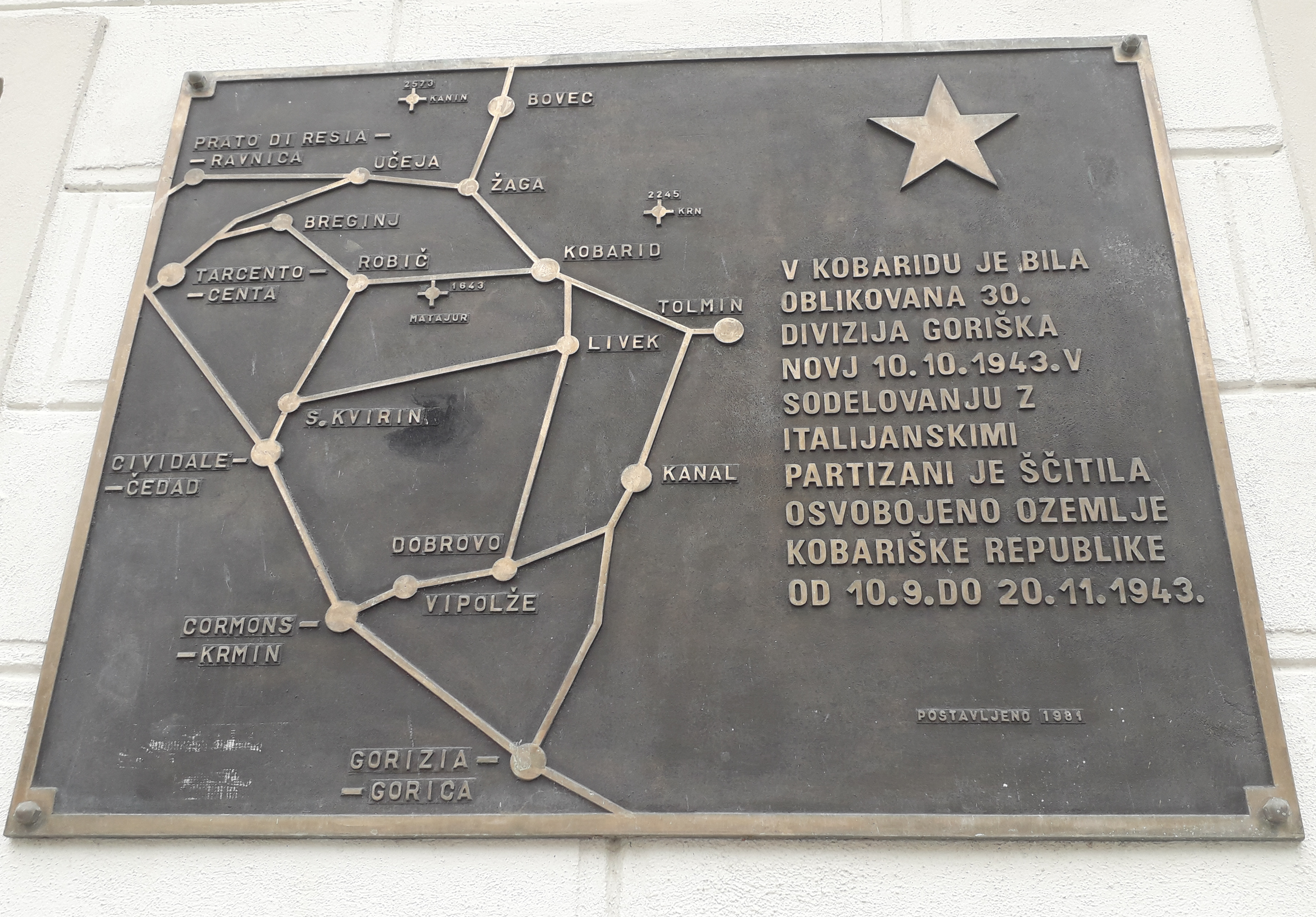
Commemorative plaque made in 1981, located in "Liberty Square" in Kobarid, in honor of the partisan republic.

The Republic of Caporetto (Italian: Repubblica di Caporetto; Slovene: Kobariška republika) was a partisan republic founded on 10 September 1943 and that persisted until 1 November of the same year. The republic is attributed to the foundation of the idea of a united democratic country of Slovenia and it is the first democratic republic of the region. The foundation of the republic is considered as one of the major milestones of Slovenian history. In Italian history it is considered notable due to the fact it is dubbed the first italian partisan republic. The liberated territory, at its peak covered 2,750 km2 with more than 100,000 inhabitants.

== Name ==
The name of the republic was not initially chosen by the partisans within it, but rather, it originated from the way Nazi Germany's forces deployed in the area started calling it when they encountered the republic's forces in the local areas of Kobarid/Caporetto, Tarvisio, Gorizia and Cividale del Friuli.

== History ==
=== Foundation ===
In the aftermath of the Armistice of Cassibile (8 September 1943), which marked Italy's surrender to the Allies, the territories occupied by the Kingdom of Italy following the invasion of Yugoslavia became the scene of a joint resistance against the impending German occupation. Italian partisan and Slovenian units, elements of the Royal Italian Army, and local civilians joined forces to defend the area. The republic was led by slovene partisan Ferdo Kravanja, native of Čezsoča, his partisan name was "Peter Skalar".

=== Resistance ===
During its existence a successful incursion led to the liberation of 56 political prisoners from the Udine prison. On 14 September 1943 the Andrej Manfred Battalion was formed from the local militias and inhabitants recruited from Bovec, Kobarid and Venetian localities. The battalion was commanded by partisan Franc Uršič, also known by his partisan name "Joško".

On 16 September 1943, the Supreme Plenum of the Liberation Front of the Slovene Nation in the republic adopted a decree on the annexation of the Slovenian Littoral to a free and united Slovenia in a free and democratic Yugoslavia, promising to also incorporate within it slovene-speaking areas of Resia and portions of Veneto; However, it is worth noting that, in contrast, some slovene and italian elements within the republic itself wanted to rejoin a democratic Italy following an hypothetical end of the war.

On 1 October 1943, due to the increase in manpower, a new battalion was created, the 2nd Isonzo Brigade. This brigade was led by partisan Tone Bavec, also known by his partisan name "Cene". When the numbers of the new division also became overwhelming, it resulted in the creation of a new division on 10 October 1943, the Gorizia Division, led by partisan leader Albert Jakopič, also known as Kajtimir. The republic's army by then had reached a peak of 5,000 units. Slovenes and Italians were not the only participating in the republic's partisan army; Members of the Yugoslav Partisan Army of Montenegrin and Croatian descent also joined the various divisions, alongside Soviet, English and French prisoners of war. Amongst the Italian partisans battalions there were the Brigate Garibaldi under the leadership of partisan Mario Modotti ("Tribune" ) and friulian commander Mario Lizzero; Other italian formations included the 52nd Venetian Battalion, the Friuli Battalion led by Giacinto Calligaris ("Enrico"), the Pisacane Battalion under Gianni Bossi (“Battista”), the Mazzini Battalion in Neblo (Goriška Brda) under Filzi Vidoni, and the subsequently established Matteotti Battalion.

During its existence, the partisans of the republic managed to fend off the raids from Nazi Germany and the National Republican State of Italy in Čezsoča, Žaga, Svina, and villages in Benečija and Brda.

=== Fall ===
On 1 November 1943 the capital of the republic fell and so did its government following a German incursion.

== Administration ==
In the region around the Municipality of Kobarid (Caporetto), the liberated territory was organized as a de facto self-governing state on 10 September 1943. Its borders were guarded by partisan forces, both Italian and Slovene, political authorities were elected by local citizens, a judicial system was established, and three hospitals were opened. For the first time since the area's annexation by Italy, Slovenian-language schools were also allowed to operate. France Bevk was assigned as head of the republic's "educational organization" department, helped by the local clergy, which, however, for the most part had limited efficiency in its helping role due to the fact that most of them had studied in italian schools. The state, which kept the italian lira as the official currency, applied taxes and accepted voluntary contributions from the local population.

== Life under the republic ==
According to the testimony of Oton Medveš, given during a 2018 ceremony organized by the Association of Fighters for the Values of the National Liberation War in Bovec and Tolmin, the partisans held "rallies everywhere" throughout the republic. Medveš recalled that there was a widespread sense of normalcy and security during the republic's existence, in contrast to the harsh realities of the Second World War.

== Geography and Demographics ==
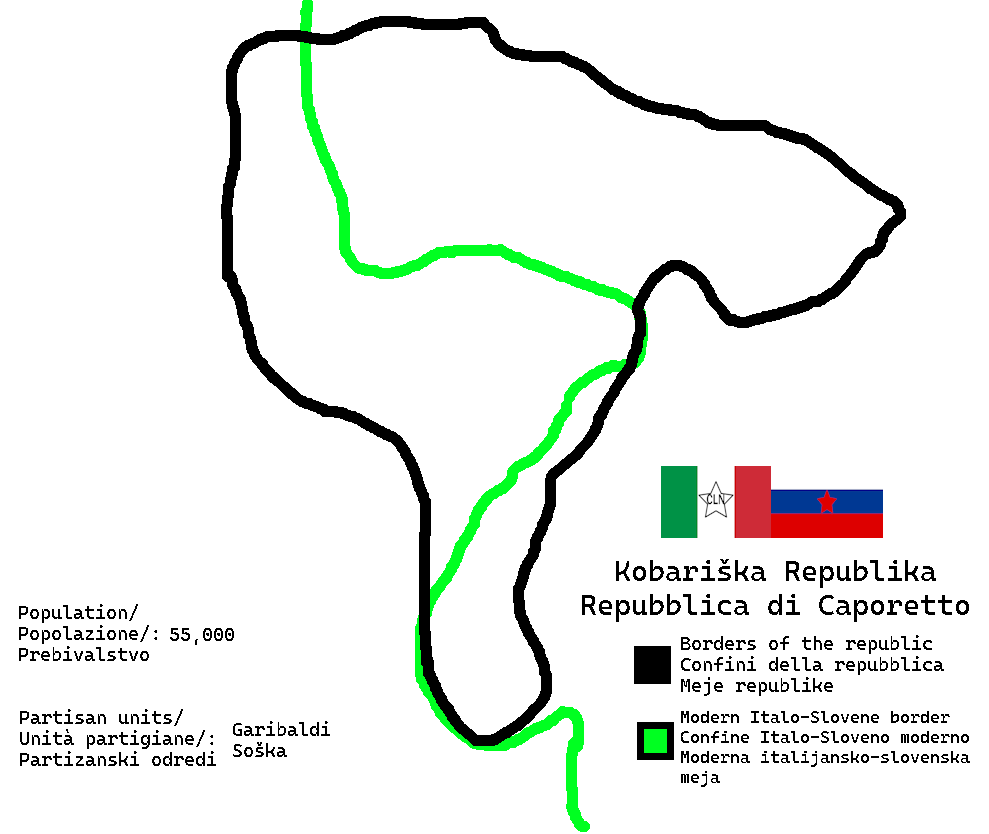
Map of the partisan republic in September 1943, compared to the modern Italo-Slovene border

The Republic of Caporetto, upon its foundation, had a population of approximately 55,000 inhabitants and covered an area of about 1,400 km^{2} (540 sq mi). It encompassed both territories that had been assigned to Italy in 1866, namely the Resia Valley and Benecia (Slavia Friulana) and the upper Soča (Isonzo) Valley north of Gorizia, which became part of the Kingdom of Italy after the First World War. This latter area included the municipalities of Bovec (Plezzo), Kobarid (Caporetto), Tolmin (Tolmino), and Kanal (Canale d'Isonzo), all of which are now part of the Republic of Slovenia. At its peak, the republic covered 2,750 km^{2} with more than 100,000 inhabitants.

== See also ==
- Italian partisan republics
- Italian resistance movement
- Slovene Partisans
