= Koritnica (river) =

River in Slovenia

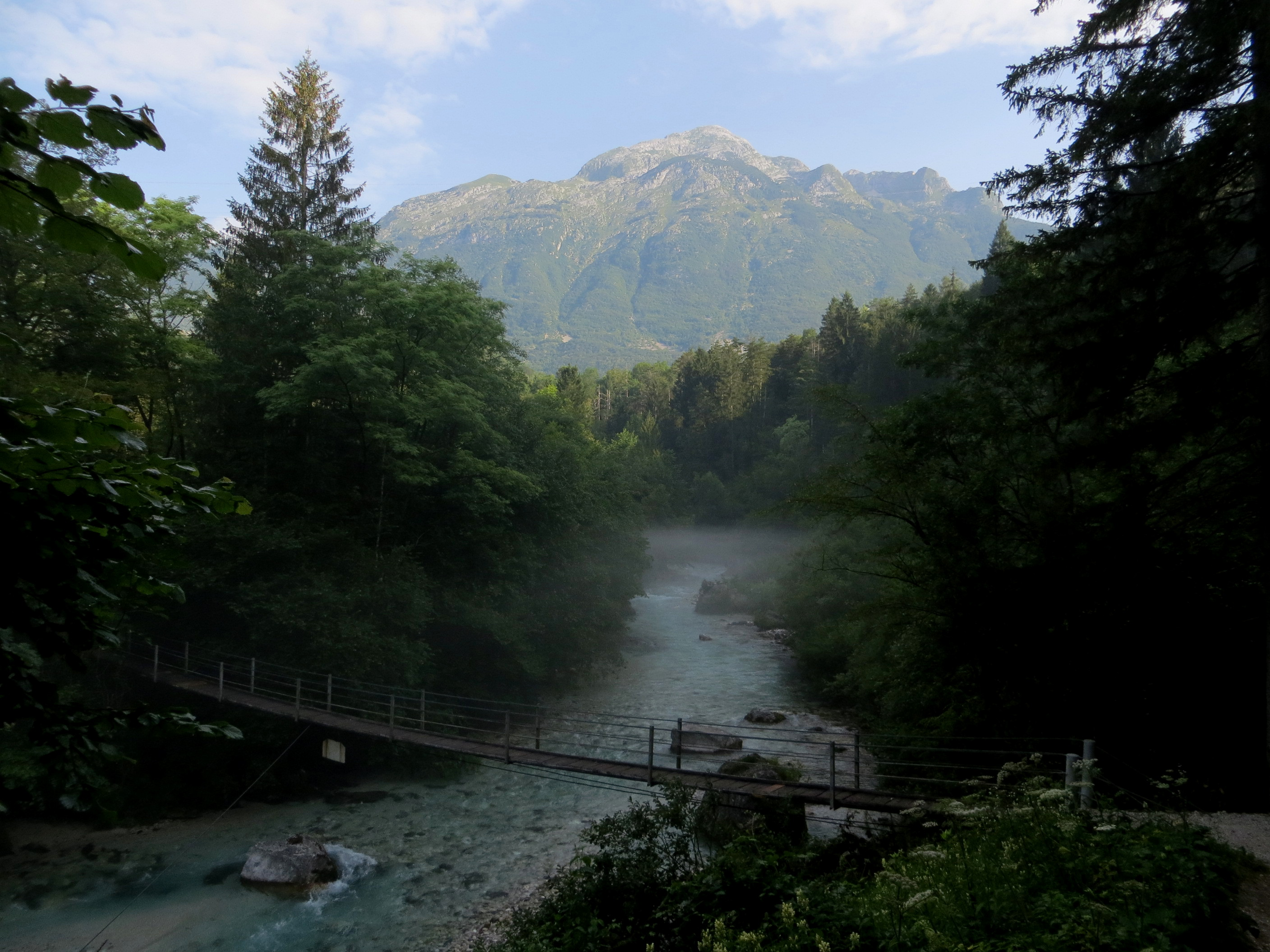

Location
- Country: Slovenia

Physical characteristics
- Source
  - location: Julian Alps, south of Mount Mangart
- Mouth
  - location: Soča River, southeast of Bovec
  - coordinates: 46°19′48.74″N 13°34′31.67″E

Basin features
- Progression: Soča→ Adriatic Sea

The Koritnica (pronounced [kɔˈɾiːtnitsa]; Italian: Coritenza), with a length slightly over 16 kilometers (9.9 mi), is a right tributary of the Soča River. It flows west through the Log Koritnica Valley (Slovene: Loška Koritnica) south of Mount Mangart and then turns south near Log pod Mangartom, flowing past the Kluže Fortress and through the 70-meter (230 ft) deep and 200-meter (660 ft) long Kluže Canyon (korita Kluže), also known as the Koritnica Canyon (korita Koritnice). It empties into the Soča southeast of Bovec.

== See also ==
- List of rivers of Slovenia
