= Jalovec =

Jalovec may refer to:

- Jalovec, Prievidza in Slovakia
- Jalovec, Liptovský Mikuláš in Slovakia
- Jalovec (mountain), a mountain in Slovenia's Julian Alps
