= Kluže Fortress =

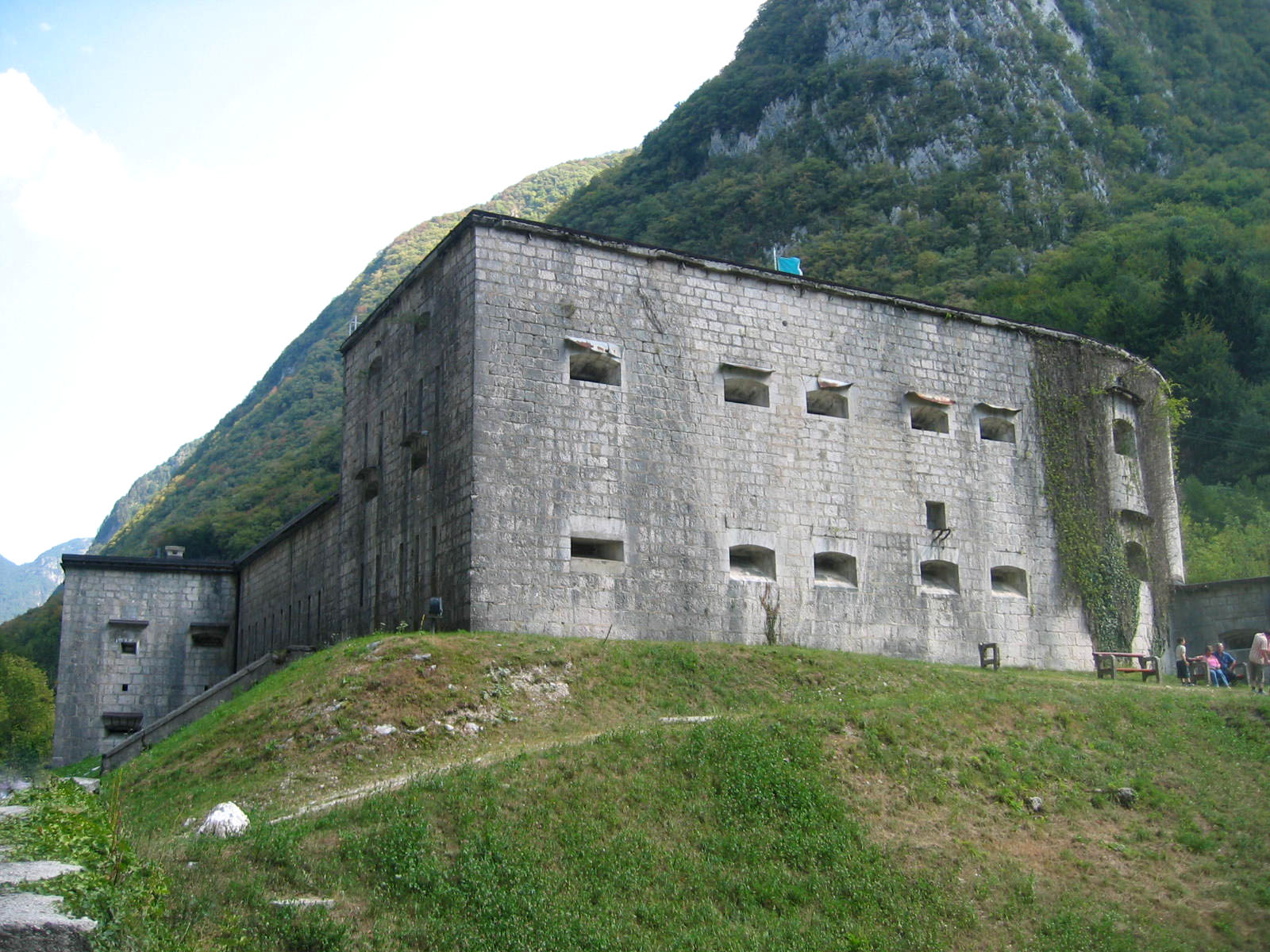

- Location within Slovenia

General information
- Location: Bovec, Slovenia
- Coordinates: 46.3611°N 13.5898°E
- Completed: 1472

Website
- www.kluze.net

The Kluže Fortress is a fort near the town of Bovec in northwestern Slovenia.

The original fortress was built in 1472 near Bovec on the road between Cave del Predil and Carinthia. Its likely original purpose was defence of Friuli against the Turks. In the course of the 16th century Bovec came under Austrian authority as a result of the wars between Venice and the Habsburgs. However, for the time being it remained as an ecclesiastical dependence of Cividale and Aquileia. At the end of the 18th century, it was entirely under Austria's administration, and remained so until 1918.

In 1796 and 1797 fighting took place around the fort, as Napoleon's army pushed through the Koritnica gorge. Napoleon's forces took the fort in 1797 by placing artillery at a higher elevation (where Fort Hermann now stands). The fortress was then destroyed. The current fort was built upon the site by the Austrians in the late 19th century. Fort Hermann, covering the higher elevation, was built at the same time. The two are linked by a trail and a tunnel. Fort Hermann was heavily damaged and rendered unusable by Italian artillery bombardment in 1915.

In 1903 part of Bovec was destroyed by a fire. What remained standing was ravaged in World War I, when the Italian-Austrian front (Battles of the Isonzo) crossed through the valley as the battle cut from north to south.
