= Fort Hermann =

Coordinates: 46.3598°N 13.5880°E

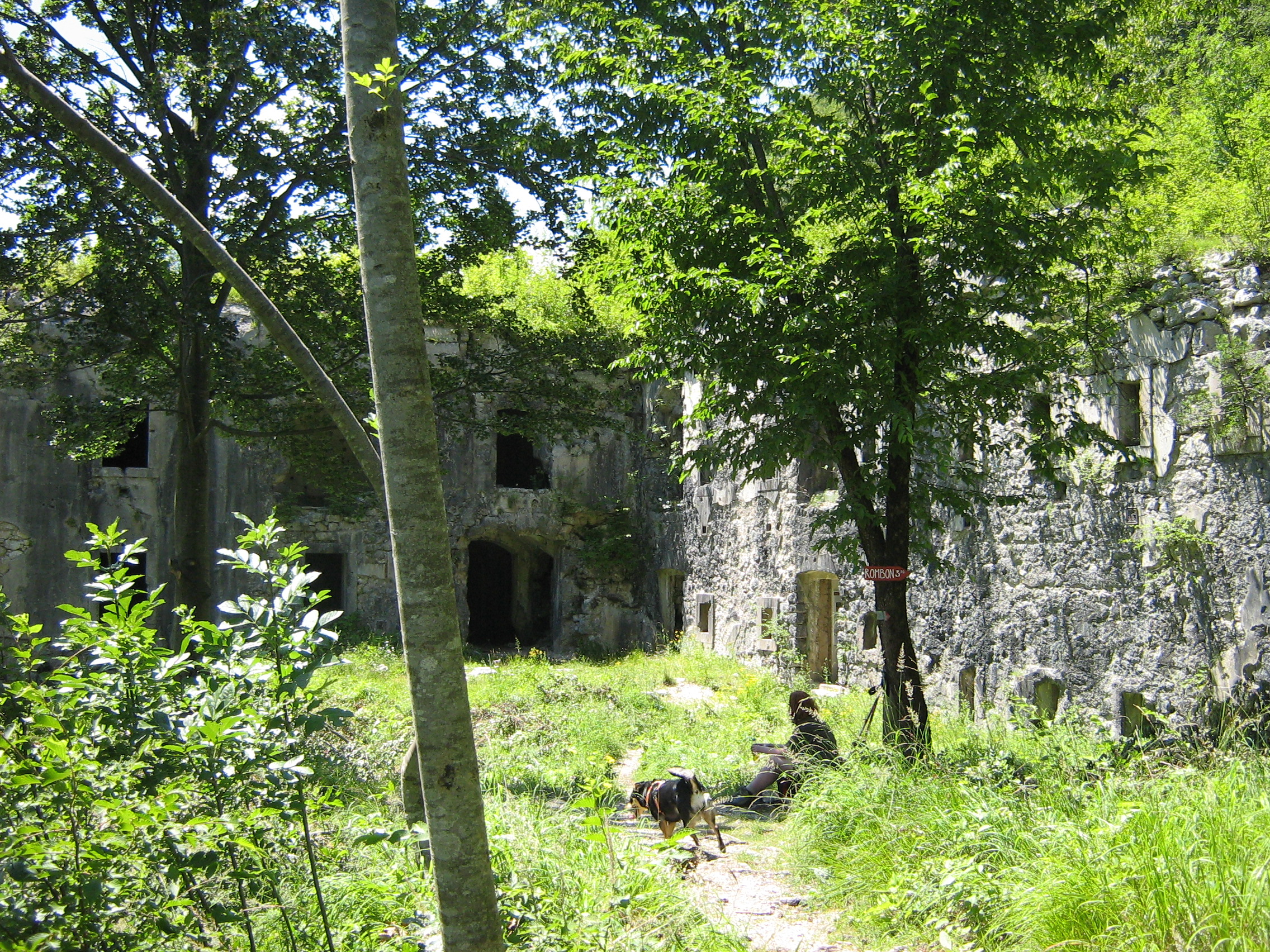
Part of the casemate battery

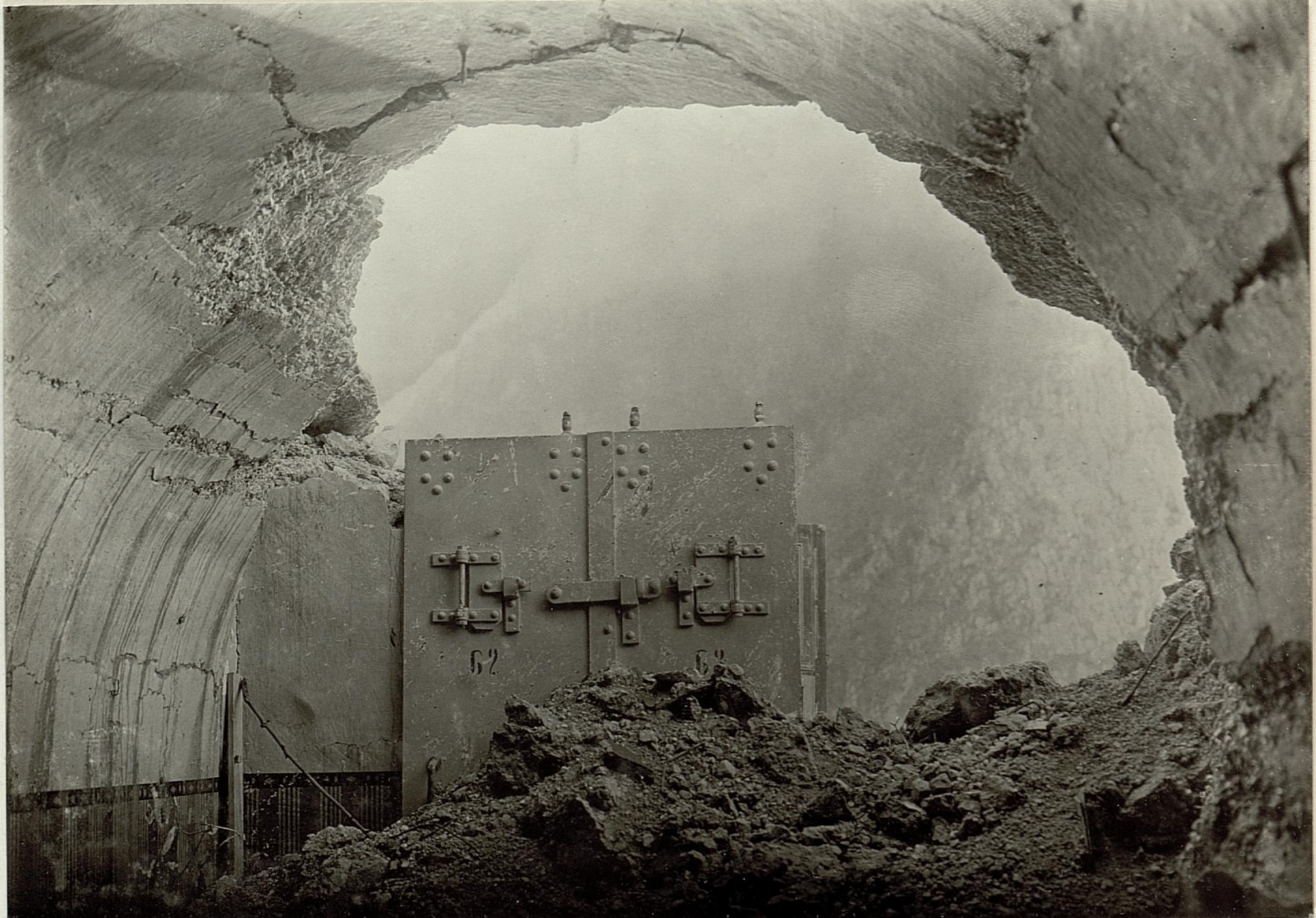
Damage caused by an Italian shell

Fort Herman is an Austro-Hungarian fortification built on Mount Rombon, now in Slovenia. Work started on Apr. 9, 1897, and ended in 1900. Fort Hermann is named after Johann Hermann von Hermannsdorf, who died nearby fighting Napoleon’s forces in 1809. Hermann was built to supplement the aging Werk Flitscher Klause, just down the mountain. Fort Hermann was also built to control the Bovec Valley and support Flitscher Klause with artillery. Hermann is designated a fort because it is named after a person rather than a location.

== Armament ==
- Two 15 cm mortars
- Four 12 cm howitzers in casemates

== World War I ==
Despite the rather new construction, Hermann was obsolete by World War I. As preparation for the coming battles, Hermann was heavily shelled by Italian heavy guns, which in June 1915, managed to pierce the casemate. The guns were removed, and in March 1916, the Austro-Hungarians abandoned it.
