= Čezsoča =

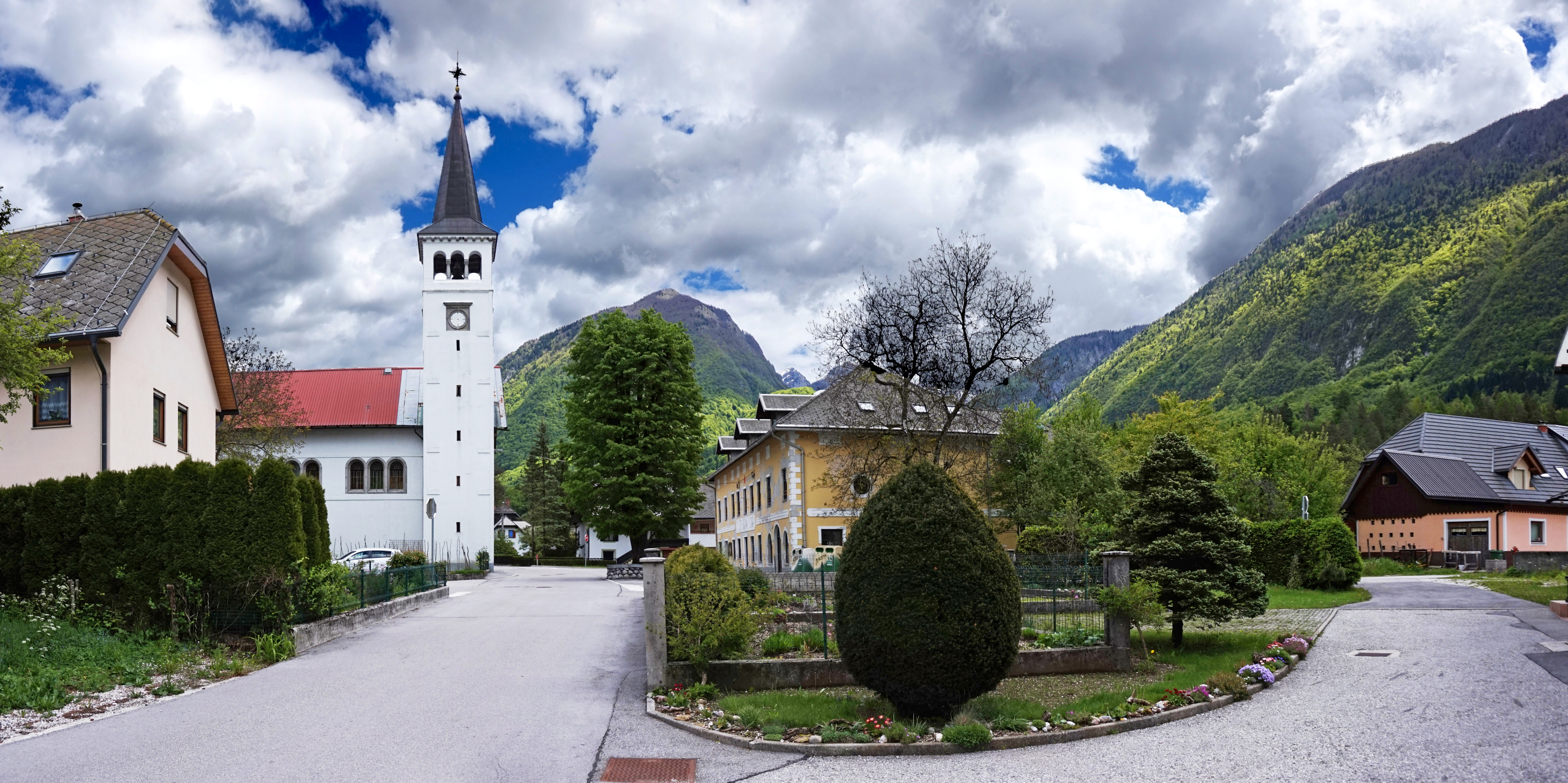

- Location in Slovenia
- Coordinates: 46°18′50.77″N 13°33′25.34″E
- Country: Slovenia
- Traditional region: Slovenian Littoral
- Statistical region: Gorizia
- Municipality: Bovec

Area
  - Total: 35.02 km^{2} (13.52 sq mi)
- Elevation: 460 m (1,510 ft)

Population (2020)
  - Total: 313
  - Density: 8.94/km^{2} (23.1/sq mi)

Čezsoča (pronounced [tʃɛˈsoːtʃa]; Italian: Oltresonzia) is a settlement in the Municipality of Bovec in the Littoral region of Slovenia. It includes the hamlets of Gorenja Vas (Slovene: Gorenja vas), Dolenja Vas (Dolenja vas), Jablanica, Kršovec, and Na Glavi.

== Geography ==
Čezsoča lies in the valley on the left bank of the Soča River. The terrain then rises up towards Mount Polovnik (1,480 m). East of the settlement is Humčič Hill (810 m), behind which rises Mount Javoršček (1,557 m). Oplenk Creek flows through the village between Gorenja Vas and Dolenja Vas, and Slatenik Creek flows below Humčič Hill. The mountains block direct sunlight from the village from mid-November to the end of February, making the winter in Čezsoča more severe than in neighboring Bovec. The broad river banks on the Soča and its proximity to the town of Bovec make Čezsoča popular with visitors.

== History ==
The village was badly damaged during the First World War because it was located on the front line. During the Second World War, Partisan troops in the First Bovec Company assembled in a World War I bunker at Humčič Hill in 1942. On 8 November 1943 the village came under German aerial bombardment and several houses were burned.

== Church ==
Saint Anthony the Great Church

The church in Čezsoča is dedicated to Saint Anthony the Great. It was badly damaged during the First World War and restored in a Romanesque style in 1927. It contains the remnants of old frescoes. The altar painting is a 1931 work by Eda Galli.

== Other cultural heritage ==
In addition to Saint Anthony the Great Church, other sites in Čezsoča are registered as cultural heritage:

- The remains of a lime kiln stand next to the bridge across the Soča River. The lime kiln was built in the 19th century and has a stone base.
- The farm at Čezsoča no. 17 features a large two-story house built in the Bovec–Trenta style, dating from the 19th century.
- The former house at Čezsoča no. 15 is located in the upper end of the village and dates from the first quarter of the 20th century. It is a two-story house built in the Bovec–Trenta style. The west side has a door casing with a semicircular top. The structure is being used as an outbuilding today.
- The house at Čezsoča no. 10 stands in the hamlet of Jablanica and dates from the first quarter of the 20th century. It is a single-story house with a half-hip roof. The front side has masonry steps and a balcony, and an extended wooden awning.
- The house at Čezsoča no. 23 stands in the hamlet of Gorenja Vas and dates from circa 1900. It is a solid structure with a cellar and a half-hip roof with external stairs and a balcony. The front side has broad wooden eaves.
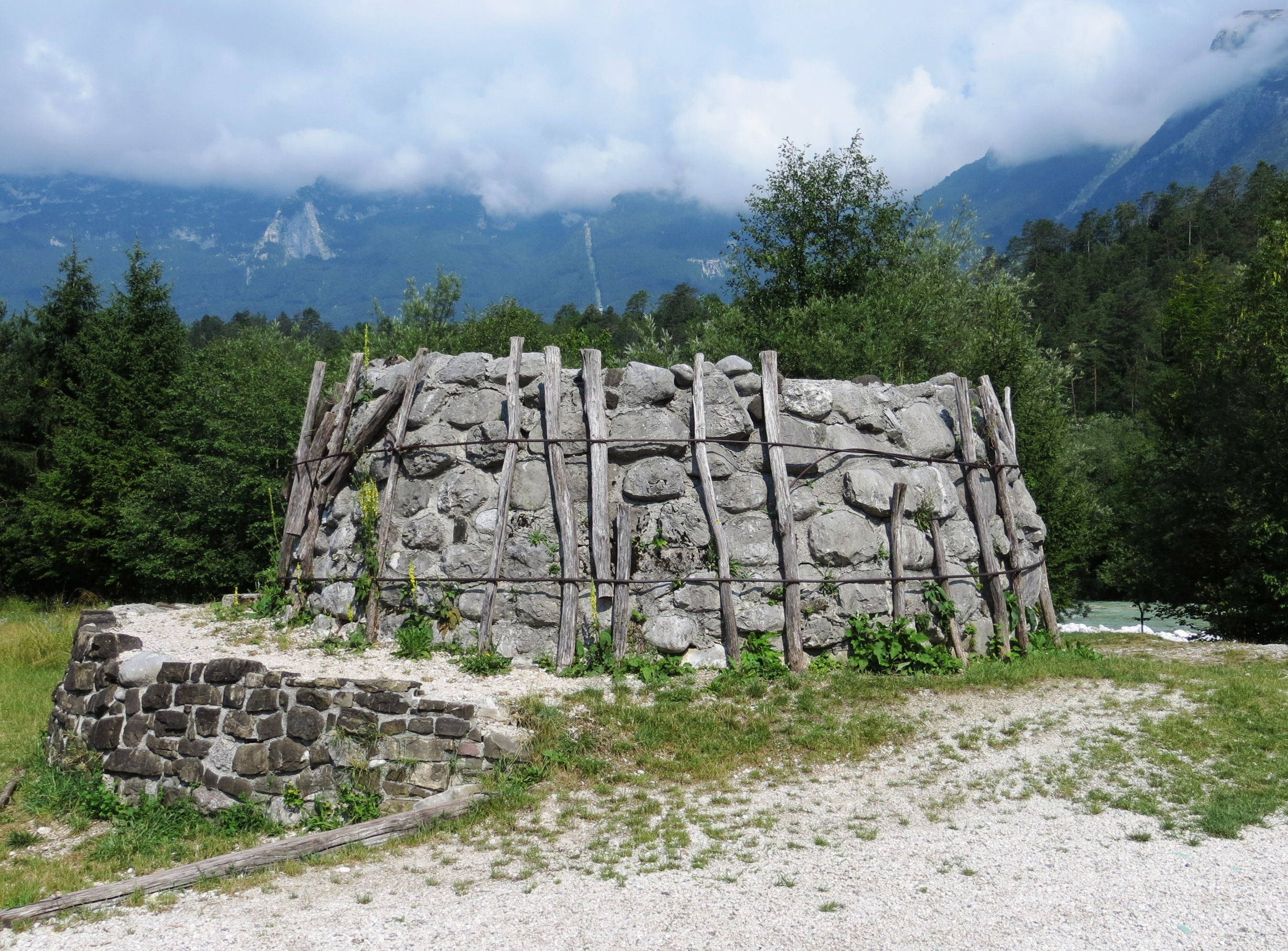
Lime kiln

== Notable people ==
Notable people that were born or lived in Čezsoča include:

- Ferdo Kravanja (a.k.a. Peter Skalar, 1911–1944), anti-Fascist resistance fighter
