= Paljevo =

Paljevo is a place name that may refer to:

- Paljevo, Kanal ob Soči, a village in the Municipality of Kanal ob Soči, western Slovenia
- Paljevo, Tutin, a village in the Municipality of Tutin, southwestern Serbia
