= Bovec =

- Town
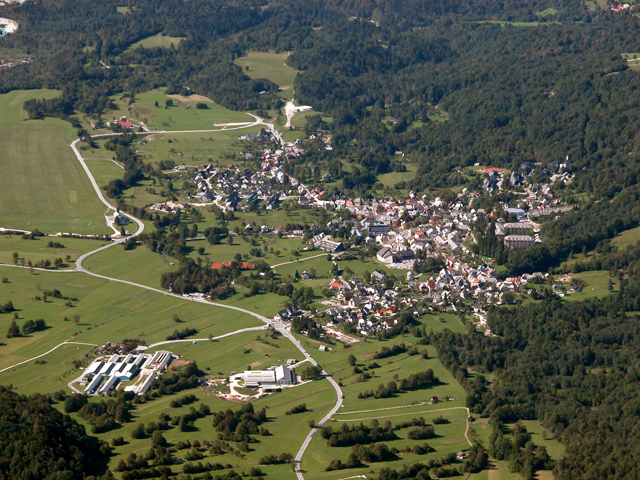
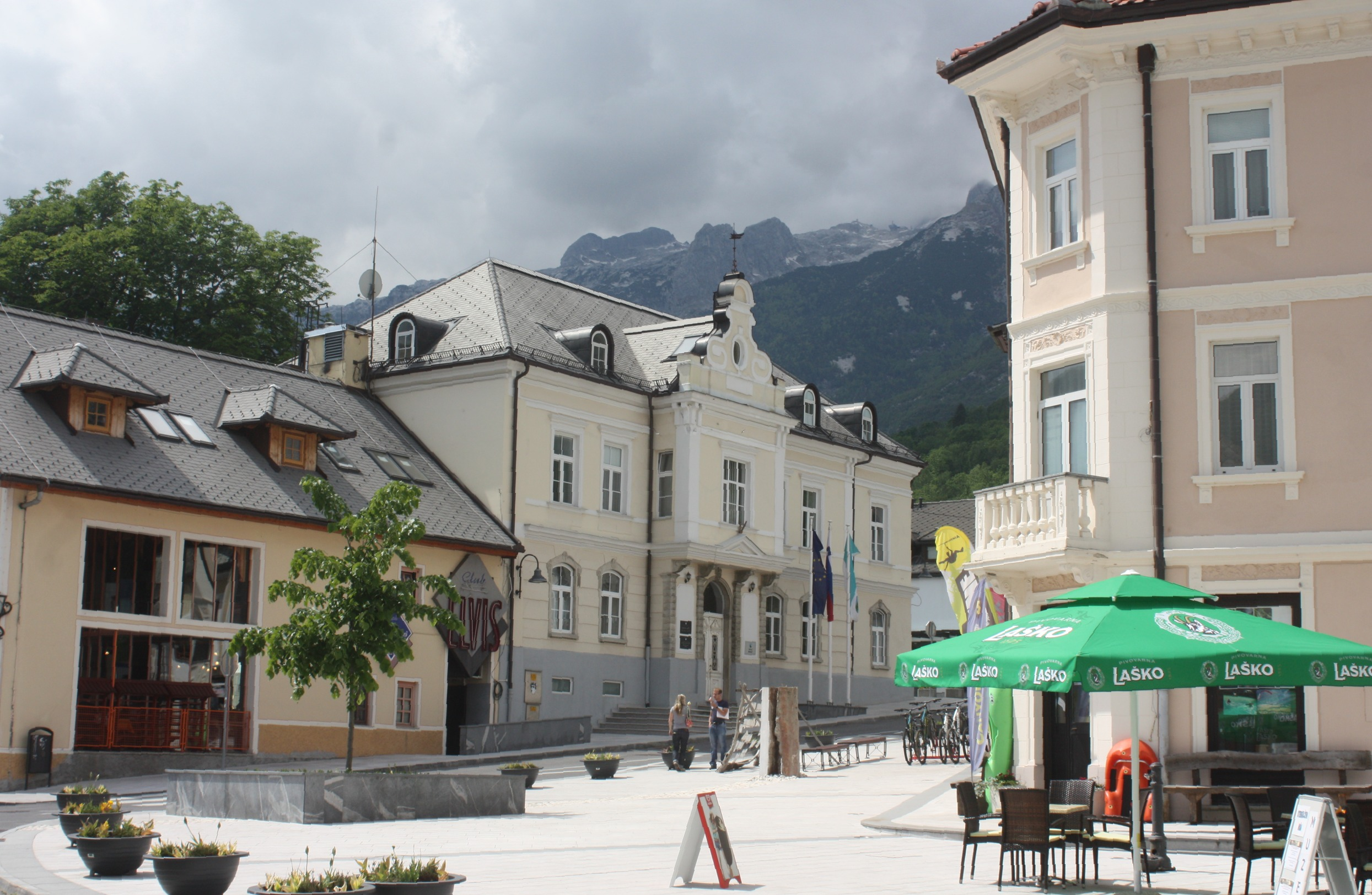
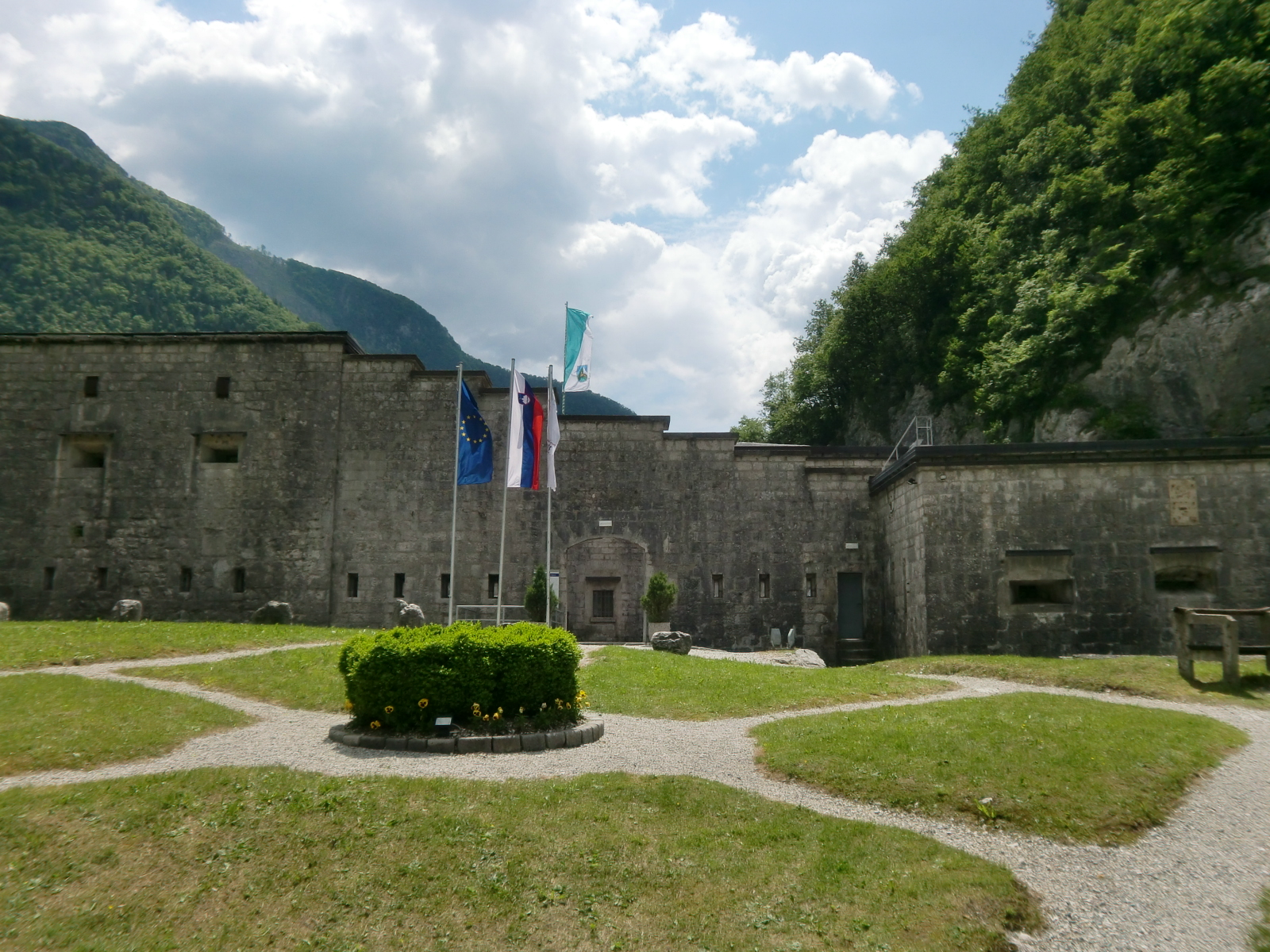
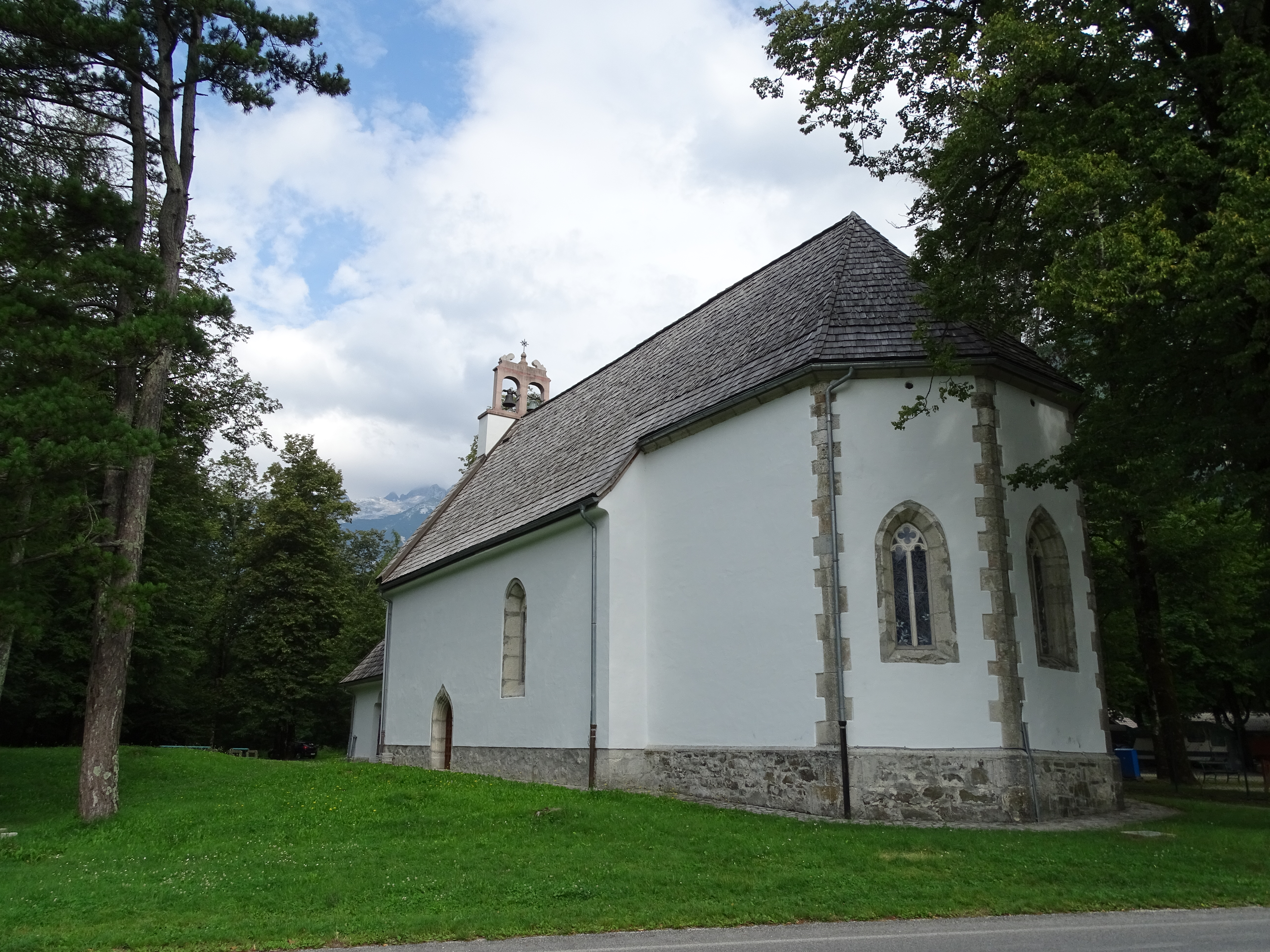
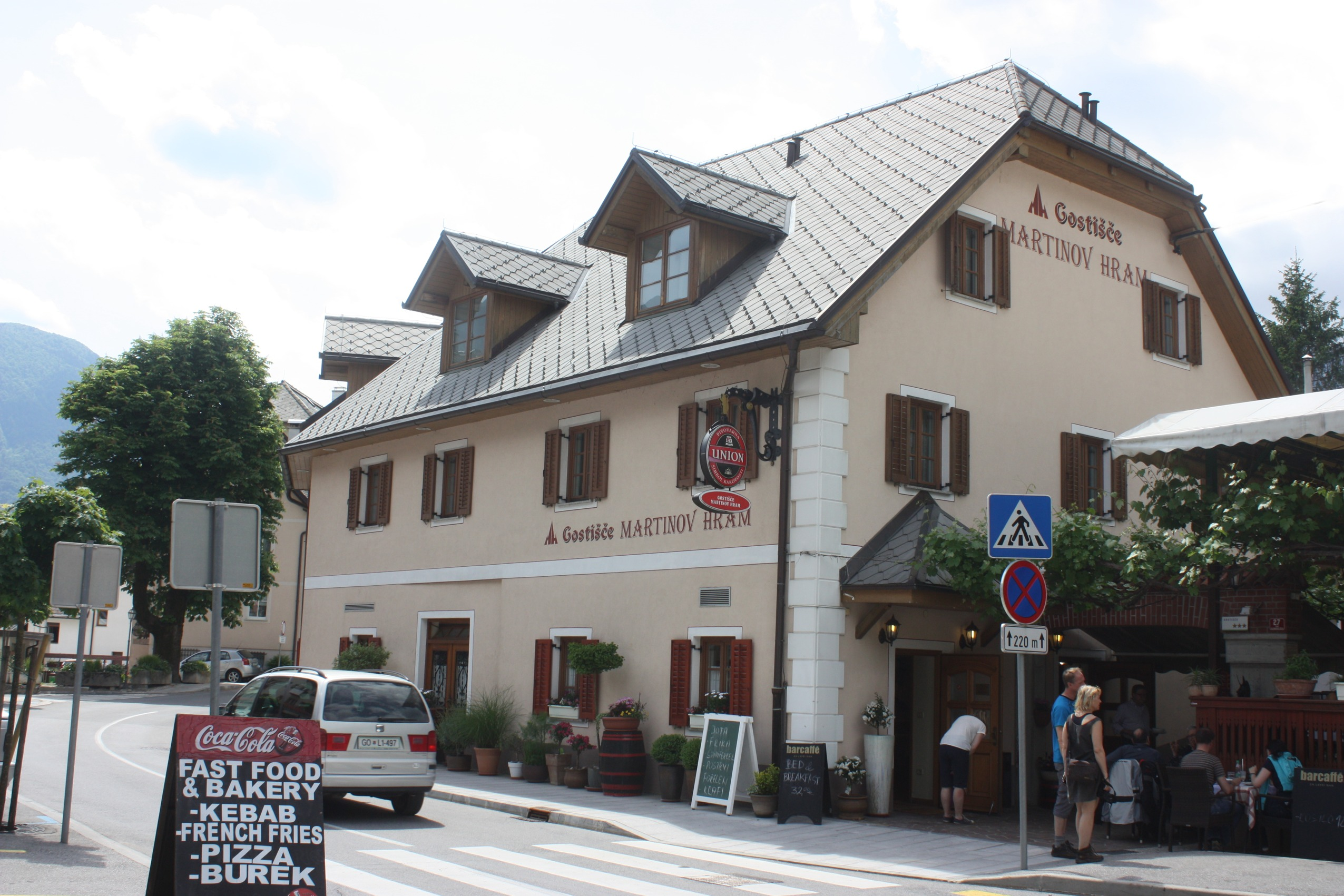
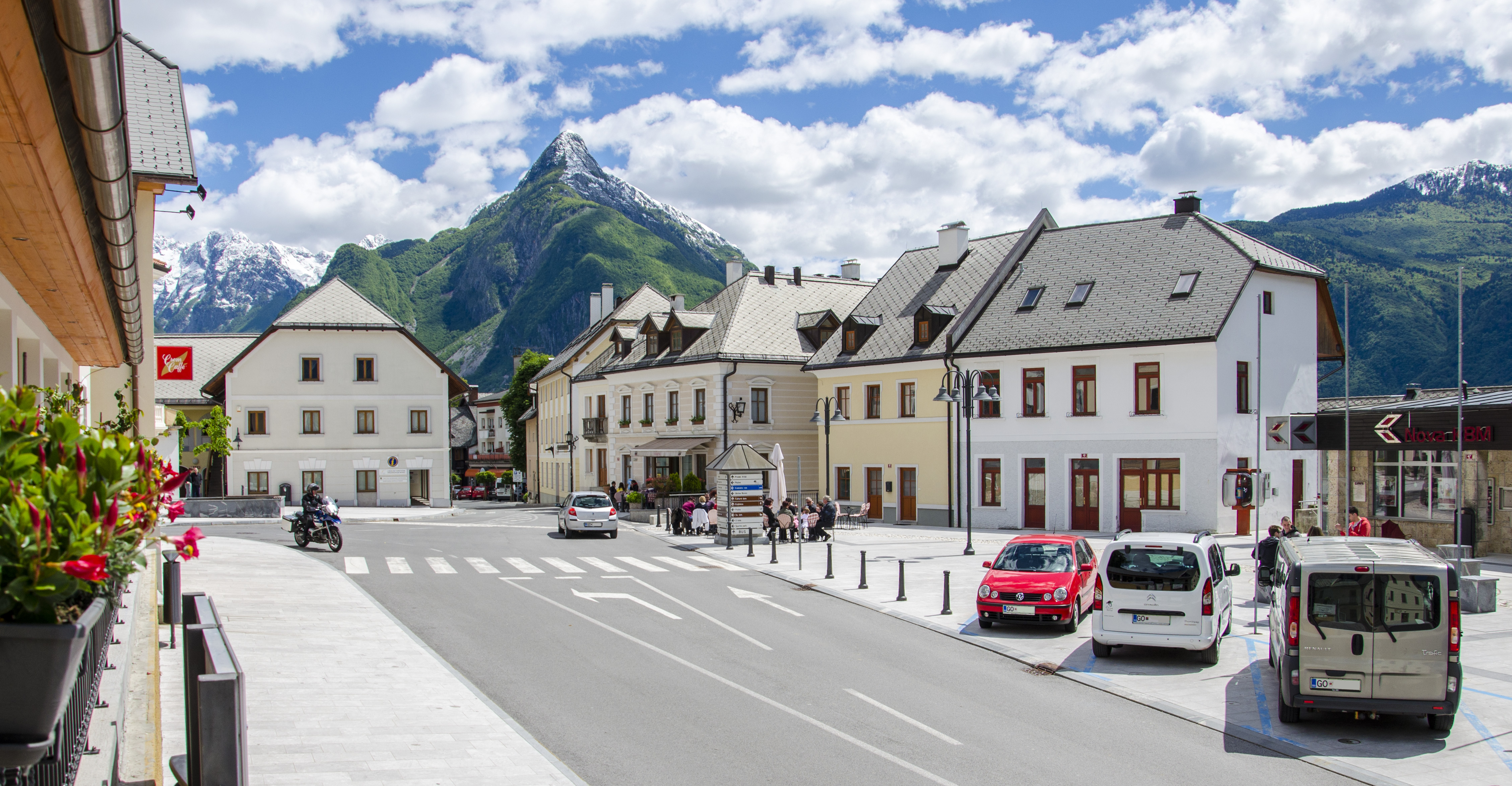
- From top, left to right: Bovec from above, Administration building, Kluže Fort, St. Mary's Church, Martinov Hram Inn, Town center

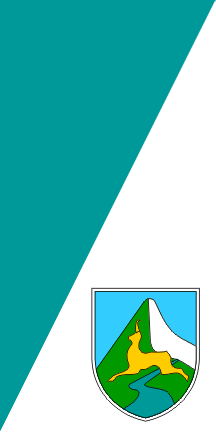
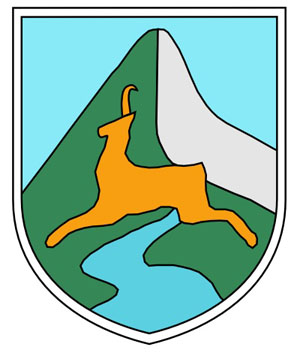
- Flag Coat of arms

- Location in Slovenia
- Coordinates: 46°20′16″N 13°33′08″E
- Country: Slovenia
- Traditional region: Slovene Littoral
- Statistical region: Gorizia
- Municipality: Bovec

Area
  - Total: 25.22 km^{2} (9.74 sq mi)
- Elevation: 453.5 m (1,488 ft)

Population (2025)
  - Total: 1,507
  - Density: 59.75/km^{2} (154.8/sq mi)
- Postal code: 5230 Bovec
- Climate: Cfb

Bovec (pronounced [ˈbɔ̀ːʋəts]; Italian: Plezzo, German: Flitsch, Pless, Friulian: Plèz) is a town in the Littoral region in northwestern Slovenia, close to the border with Italy. It is the central settlement of the Municipality of Bovec.

== Geography ==
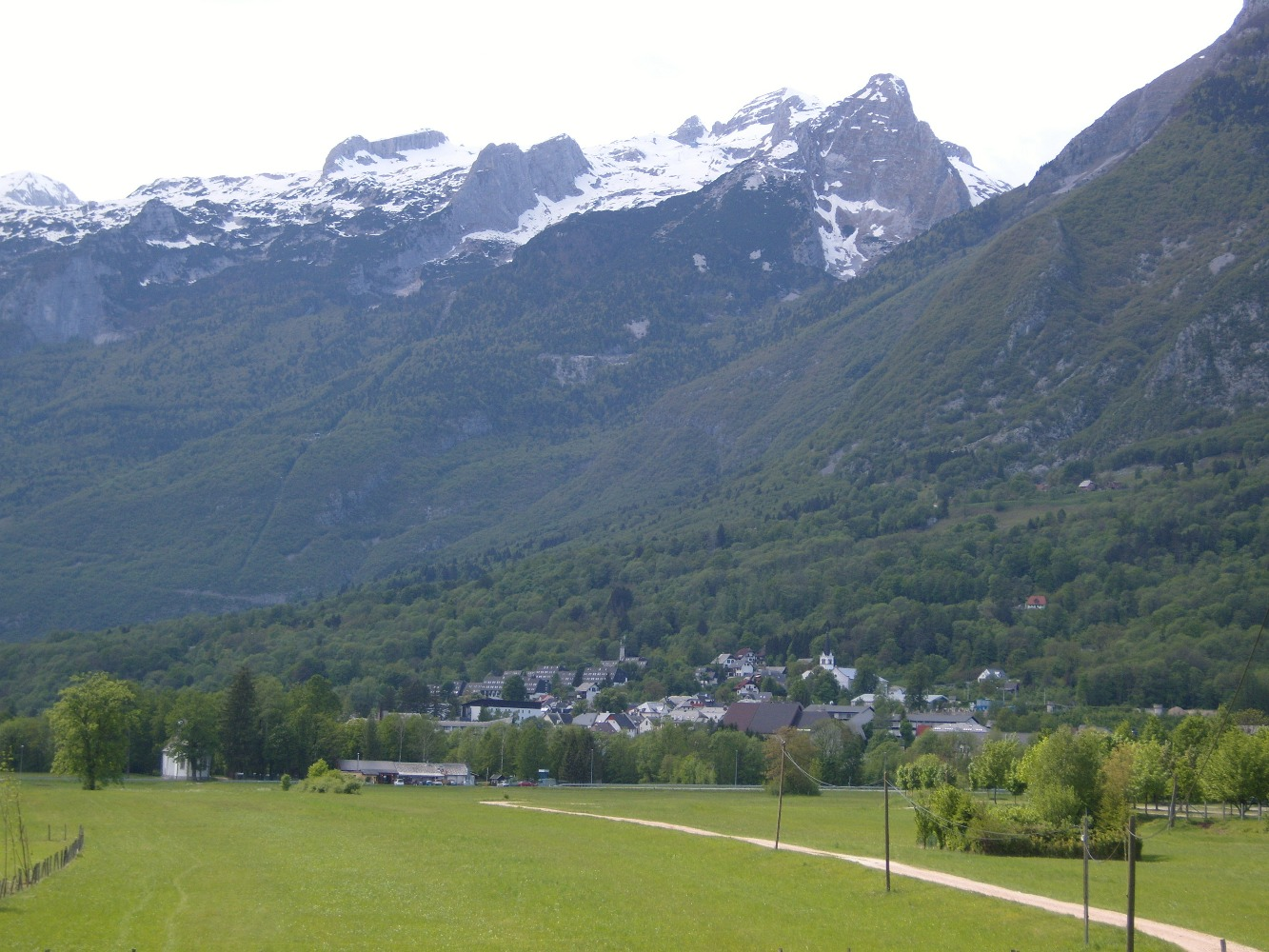
View of Bovec and Mt. Kanin

Bovec is located 136 kilometres (85 mi) from the capital Ljubljana, at an elevation of 434 m (1,424 ft). The settlement lies in the Bovec Basin of the upper Soča (Isonzo) River, below the eastern slopes of Mount Kanin in the Julian Alps, forming the border with Italy. The adjacent Trenta Valley in the northwest leads into Triglav National Park.

It has been traditionally part of the historic Goriška region, but today locals prefer to identify with the wider region of the Slovene Littoral.

== Name ==
Bovec was attested in written sources in 1070 as Plecium and Pletium (and as Vlicez in 1181–96, Plezio in 1257, and Pleç in 1377). During the 12th and 13th centuries, the name designated not only the settlement itself, but also the wider Upper Soča region, including the Trenta Valley. The Slovene name is derived from the Slavic form *blьcь, but this itself is of pre-Slavic origin.

The Friulian and German names indicate that the names may be derived from *Plitium or *Pletium, which could possibly be connected with the oronym Phligadia mentioned by the ancient Greek geographer Strabo or the place name Phlygades. Less likely possibilities include a connection to the ancient place names Ampletium and Planta. In the local dialect, the settlement is known as Bec.

== History ==
Archaeological finds in the upper Soča Valley indicate continuous settlement since the Hallstatt era. In ancient times, the area on the Roman road leading up to the Predil Pass was part of the northeastern Venetia et Histria region of the Italia province. It was incorporated into the Carolingian March of Friuli, after Charlemagne had conquered the Italian Kingdom of the Lombards in 774.

With the medieval Kingdom of Italy, it came under the rule of King Otto I of Germany in 952 and was incorporated into the Imperial March of Verona. Bovec itself was first mentioned in 1192, when it belonged to the ecclesiastical Patria del Friuli, ruled by the Patriarchs of Aquileia. It was part of Tolmin (Tolmein) County, which was conquered by the Republic of Venice in 1420 and incorporated into the Domini di Terraferma.

=== Habsburg rule ===
Historical population
Year	Pop.	±%
1948	1,255	—
1953	1,252	−0.2%
1961	1,314	+5.0%
1971	1,408	+7.2%
1981	1,676	+19.0%
1991	1,675	−0.1%
2002	1,612	−3.8%
2011	1,631	+1.2%
2021	1,671	+2.5%
2025	1,507	−9.8%
Population size may be affected by changes in administrative divisions.

The lands on the upper Soča River were finally annexed to the Inner Austrian lands under Emperor Maximilian I during the War of the League of Cambrai in 1509 and added to the County of Gorizia (Görz) in the south, which Maximilian had inherited in 1500.

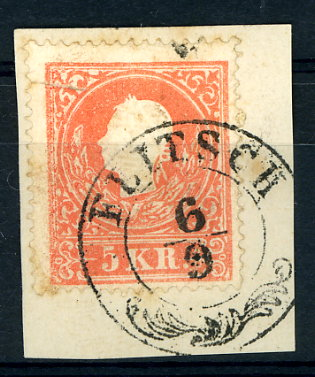
Austrian stamp cancelled around 1860

Elevated to the Princely County of Gorizia and Gradisca in 1754, the majority of the predominantly Slovene-speaking territories of the province—with the exception of a brief period between 1809 and 1813, when it was divided between the Napoleonic Kingdom of Italy and Illyrian Provinces—remained under Austrian rule until 1918, from 1815 within the Kingdom of Illyria (Königreich Illyrien) crown land, then from 1849 within the Austrian Littoral crown land (Küstenland). Slovene completely replaced German as the language of everyday communication in the 19th century.

From 1868, during the Austro-Hungarian period when the Littoral was part of Cisleithanian Austria, Flitsch was administered within the Tolmein district (one of the 11 districts within the Littoral). The Austro-Hungarian Army had two fortresses erected along the Predil Pass road: the well-preserved Kluže Fortress in 1881–82 and the ruined Fort Hermann.

=== World War I ===
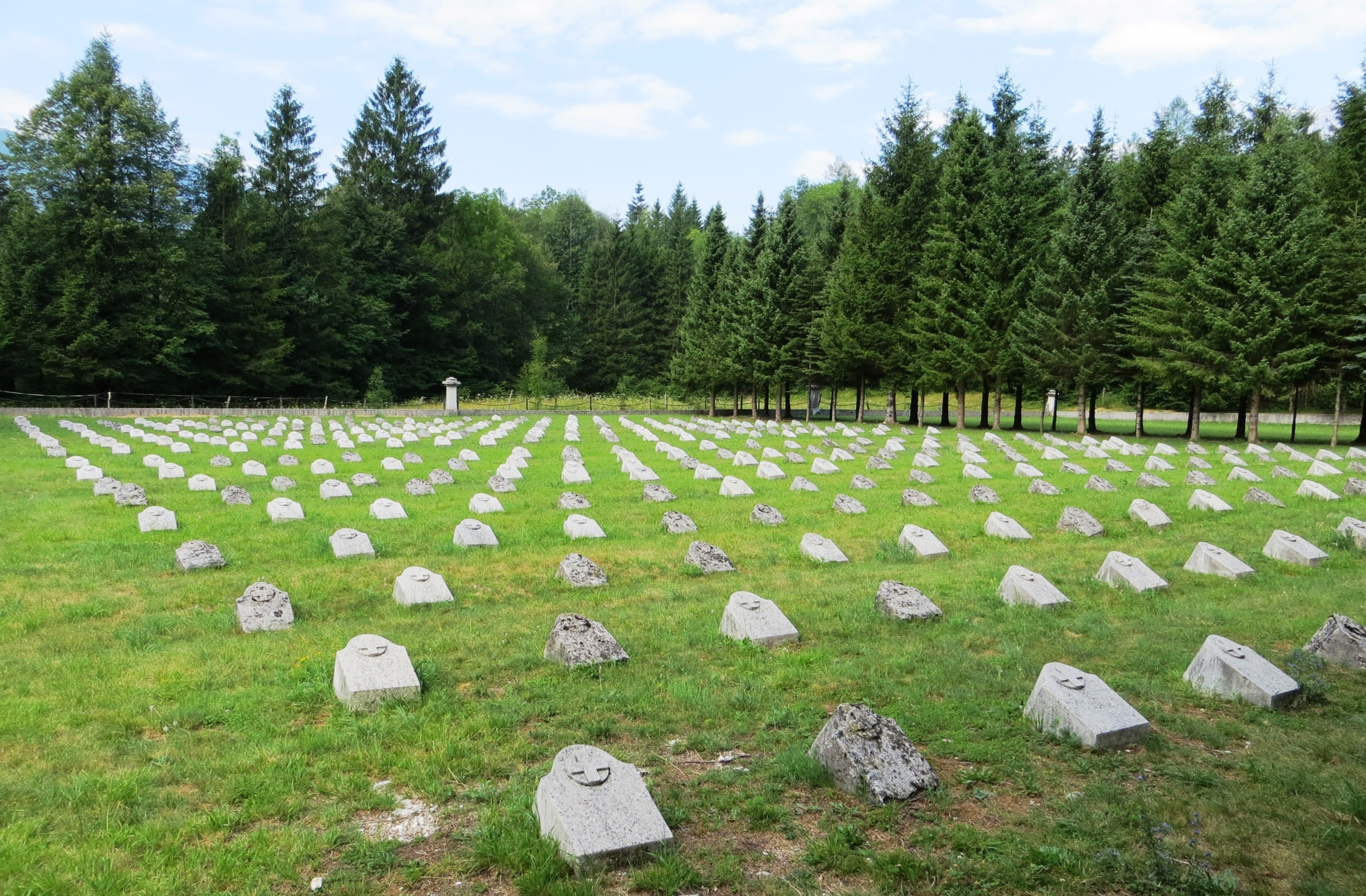
World War I military cemetery

During World War I, the area was the theatre of the bloody Battles of the Isonzo, fought between Austro-Hungarian forces and the Italian Army between June 1915 and November 1917, which devastated the region almost completely.

After the war, the military cemetery east of Bovec was expanded and the remains of Austro-Hungarian and Italian soldiers were transferred to the cemetery from surrounding cemeteries. The remains of the Italian soldiers were exhumed and transferred to the Italian military ossuary outside Kobarid in 1938. Over 600 soldiers are buried in the cemetery; the graves cover the entire cemetery area, although only the south quarter has concrete grave markers. There are no names on the grave markers.

Upon the 1918 Battle of Vittorio Veneto, Bovec was occupied by Italian forces and by the 1920 Treaty of Rapallo officially annexed to the Julian March as part of the Kingdom of Italy. Under the Italian Fascist regime between 1922 and 1943, the Slovene-speaking population of Bovec and the neighbouring villages was submitted to a policy of forced Italianization. Numerous locals in turn joined the underground militant anti-fascist TIGR organization, while many others emigrated to the neighbouring Kingdom of Yugoslavia.

=== World War II ===
Between 1943 and 1945, the area was occupied by Nazi German forces, and units of Slovene partisans were active in the area. After liberation by the Yugoslav People's Army in May 1945, Bovec came under joint British-U.S. occupation. Between June 1945 and September 1947, Bovec and the entire right bank of the Soča River was included in Zone A of the former Julian March, which was under Allied military administration, with the demarcation line with the Yugoslav occupation zone running just a few kilometers east of the town.

==== Mass grave ====
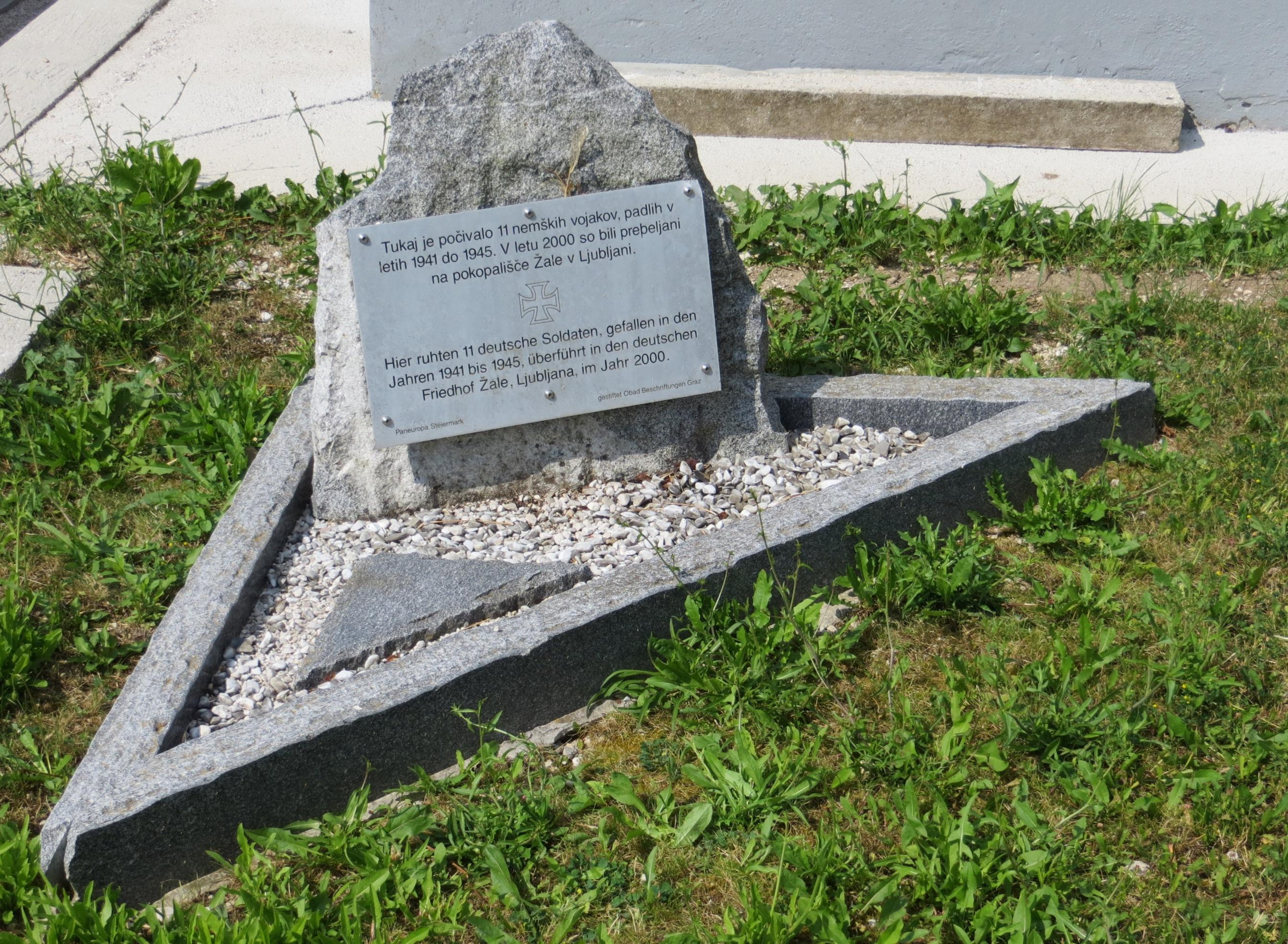
Mass grave memorial

Bovec is the site of a mass grave associated with the Second World War. The Cemetery Mass Grave (Slovene: Grobišče na pokopališču) is located next to the entrance to the town cemetery. It contained the remains of 11 German soldiers killed between 1941 and 1945. The names of all of them are known. The grave was exhumed in 2000 and the remains were transferred to Žale Cemetery in Ljubljana. Unlike most mass graves in Slovenia, the grave was well maintained during the communist era with funds provided by the German War Graves Commission. The mass grave is marked by a plaque in Slovene and German.

=== Postwar ===
In September 1947, the Paris Peace Treaties gave the town to Yugoslavia. In 1951, Bovec became a town. With the breakup of Yugoslavia in 1991, Bovec became part of independent Slovenia.

Bovec was heavily damaged by the 1976 Friuli earthquake. Another moderate quake with a magnitude of 5.6 on the Richter magnitude scale shook the town in April 1998, and a weaker one occurred in July 2004, with a 4.9 magnitude.

== Economy ==
=== Tourism ===
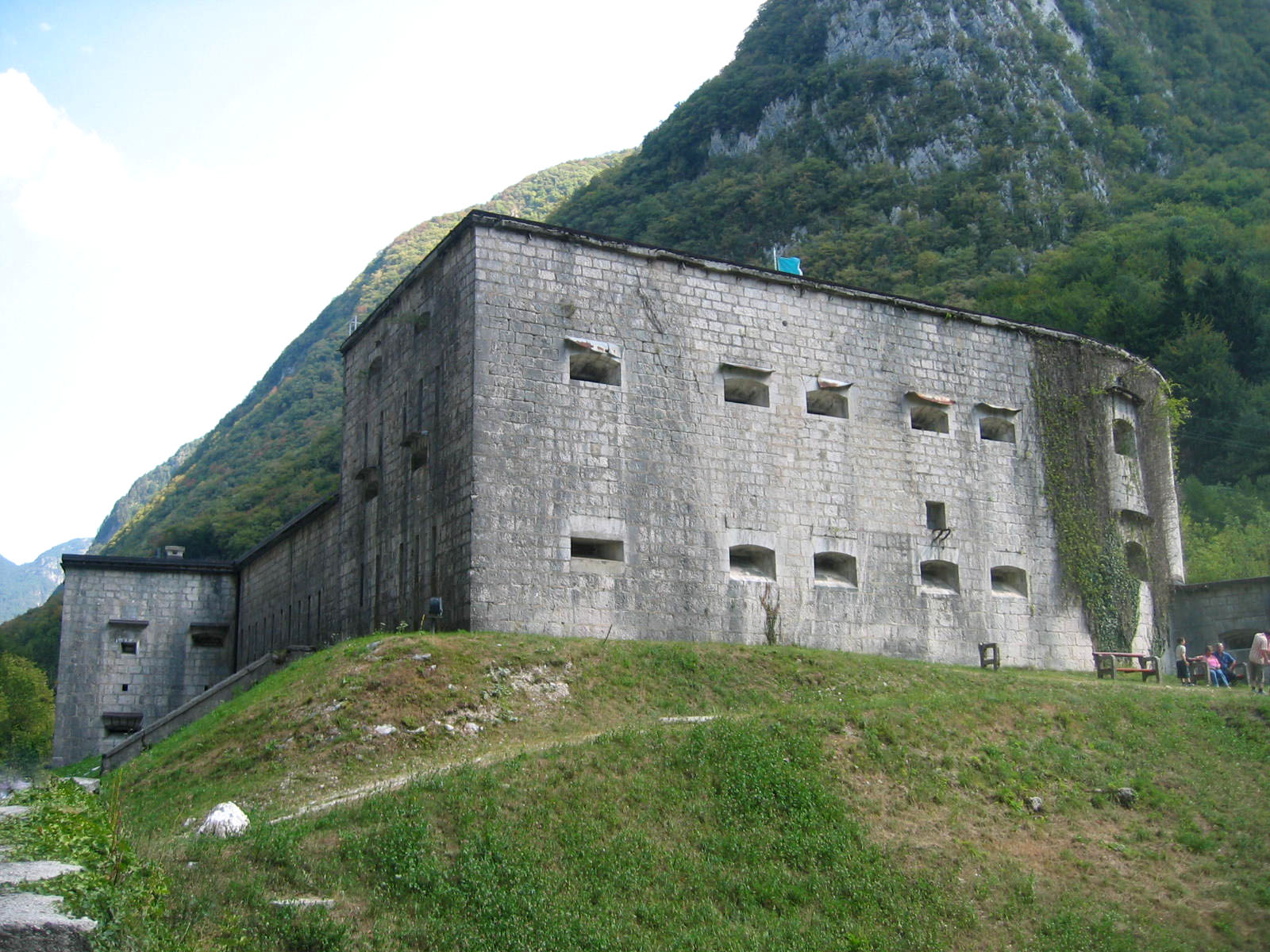
Kluže Fortress

The citizens of Bovec largely depend on tourism. In recent years, the area has become increasingly popular with advertisers and filmmakers; part of the Disney film The Chronicles of Narnia: Prince Caspian was shot here. The area received the European Destinations of Excellence award in 2008 with the Soča Stories project.

Area destinations include Boka Falls, Mount Triglav (2864 m), the Soča River, Lake Krn, the Kanin (Sella Nevea) ski resort, the Vršič Pass (1611 m), and the mountain road to the Mangart Saddle. Activities around Bovec include kayaking, rafting, hiking (the Peace Trail from Bovec to Kluže Fortress, the Soča Trail, and the Alpe-Adria Trail), performances by Društvo 1313, cheese tasting on the Mangart Plain, the Kanin circular cableway, Prestreljenik Window (Slovene: Prestreljeniško okno) and other karst features, a zip line, and fishing.

== Notable natives ==
Notable people that were born or lived in Bovec include the following:

- Vasja Klavora (born 1936), author and politician

== See also ==
- Julius Kugy
