= Jalovec, Liptovský Mikuláš District =

Village and municipality in Slovakia

Jalovec
- Municipality
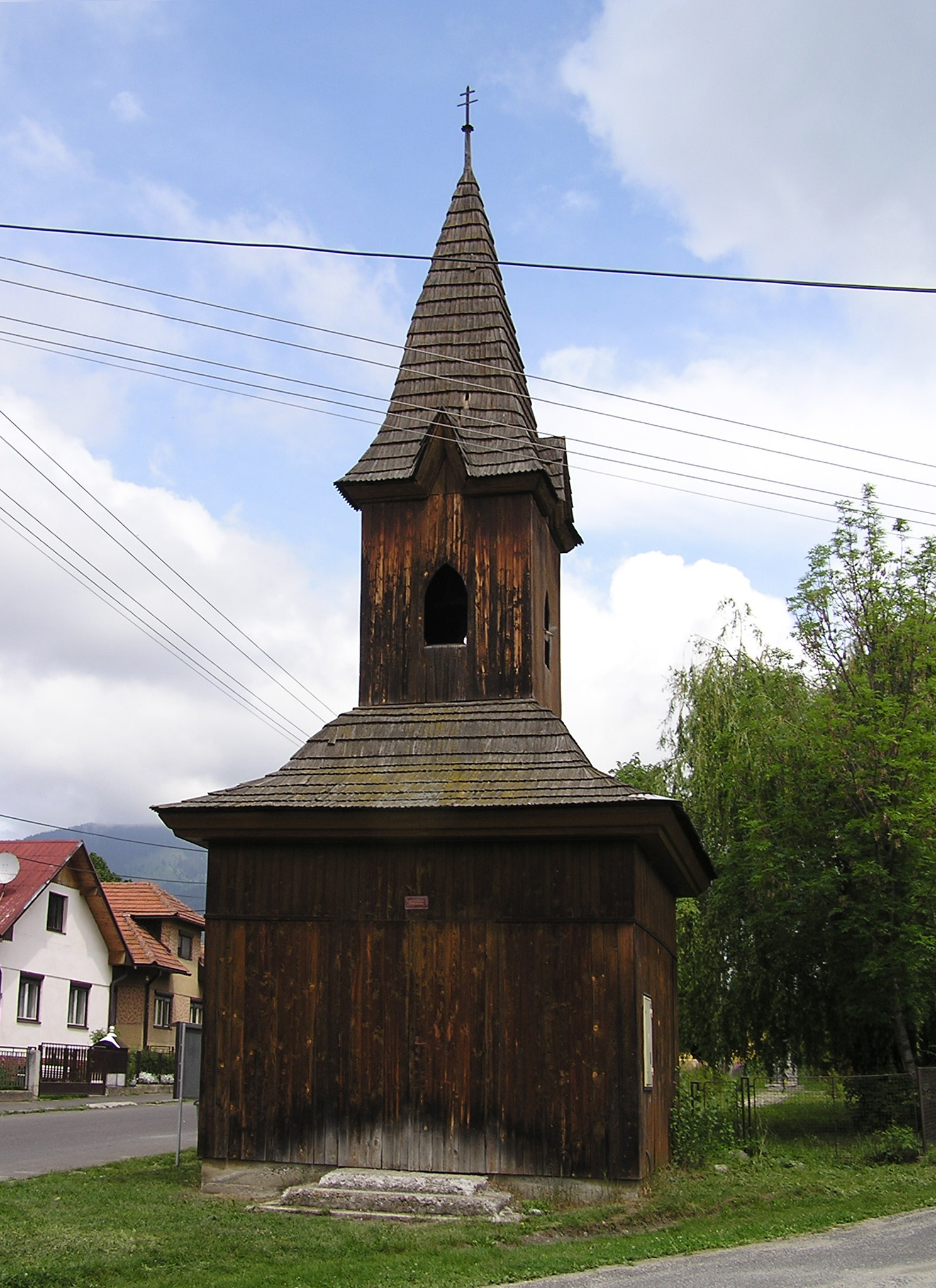

- Flag

- Location of Jalovec in the Žilina Region Location of Jalovec in Slovakia
- Coordinates: 49°08′10″N 19°37′46″E
- Country: Slovakia
- Region: Žilina Region
- District: Liptovský Mikuláš District
- First mentioned: 1391

Area
  - Total: 20.17 km^{2} (7.79 sq mi)
- Elevation: 692 m (2,270 ft)

Population (2025)
  - Total: 311
- Time zone: UTC+1 (CET)
  - Summer (DST): UTC+2 (CEST)
- Postal code: 322 1
- Area code: +421 44
- Vehicle registration plate (until 2022): LM
- Website: obecjalovec.sk

Jalovec (Hungarian: Jalóc) is a village and municipality in Liptovský Mikuláš District in the Žilina Region of northern Slovakia.

== History ==
In historical records the village was first mentioned in 1391. Before the establishment of independent Czechoslovakia in 1918, it was part of Liptó County within the Kingdom of Hungary. From 1939 to 1945, it was part of the Slovak Republic.

== Geography ==
The municipality lies at an altitude of 692 metres (2,270 ft) and covers an area of 20.17 km^{2} (7.79 sq mi) (2025).

== Population ==
Population statistic (10 years)
Year	1995	2005	2015	2025
Count	263	325	301	311
Difference		+23.57%	−7.38%	+3.32%

Population statistic
Year	2024	2025
Count	318	311
Difference		−2.20%

It has a population of 311 people (31 December 2025).

=== Ethnicity ===
Census 2021 (1+ %)
Ethnicity	Number	Fraction
Slovak	304	97.74%
Czech	6	1.92%
Total	311	

In year 2021 was 311 people by ethnicity 304 as Slovak, 6 as Czech, 3 as Not found out, 2 as Rusyn, 1 as Polish and 1 as Other.

Note on population: The difference values of population numbers in the table "Population statistic" and in the sections "Ethnicity" & "Religion" is caused by the use of various statistical methods.

=== Religion ===
Census 2021 (1+ %)
Religion	Number	Fraction
Evangelical Church	141	45.34%
Roman Catholic Church	79	25.4%
None	74	23.79%
Greek Catholic Church	7	2.25%
Total	311	

In year 2021 was 311 people by religion 141 from Evangelical Church, 79 from Roman Catholic Church, 74 from None, 7 from Greek Catholic Church, 3 from Not found out, 3 from Buddhism, 2 from United Methodist Church, 1 from Other and 1 from Ad hoc movements.

== Genealogical resources ==
The records for genealogical research are available at the state archive "Statny Archiv in Bytca, Slovakia"

- Roman Catholic church records (births/marriages/deaths): 1732–1900 (parish B)
- Lutheran church records (births/marriages/deaths): 1868–1895 (parish B)

== See also ==
- List of municipalities and towns in Slovakia
