= List of Slovenian engineers =

A list of notable engineers from Slovenia:

- Maks Klodič Sabladoski
- Bojan Kraut
- Herman Potočnik
- Zoran Rant
- Jurij Vega
- Milan Vidmar
- Svetopolk Pivko
