= Nova Gorica railway station =

Railway station in Nova Gorica, Slovenia

Nova Gorica
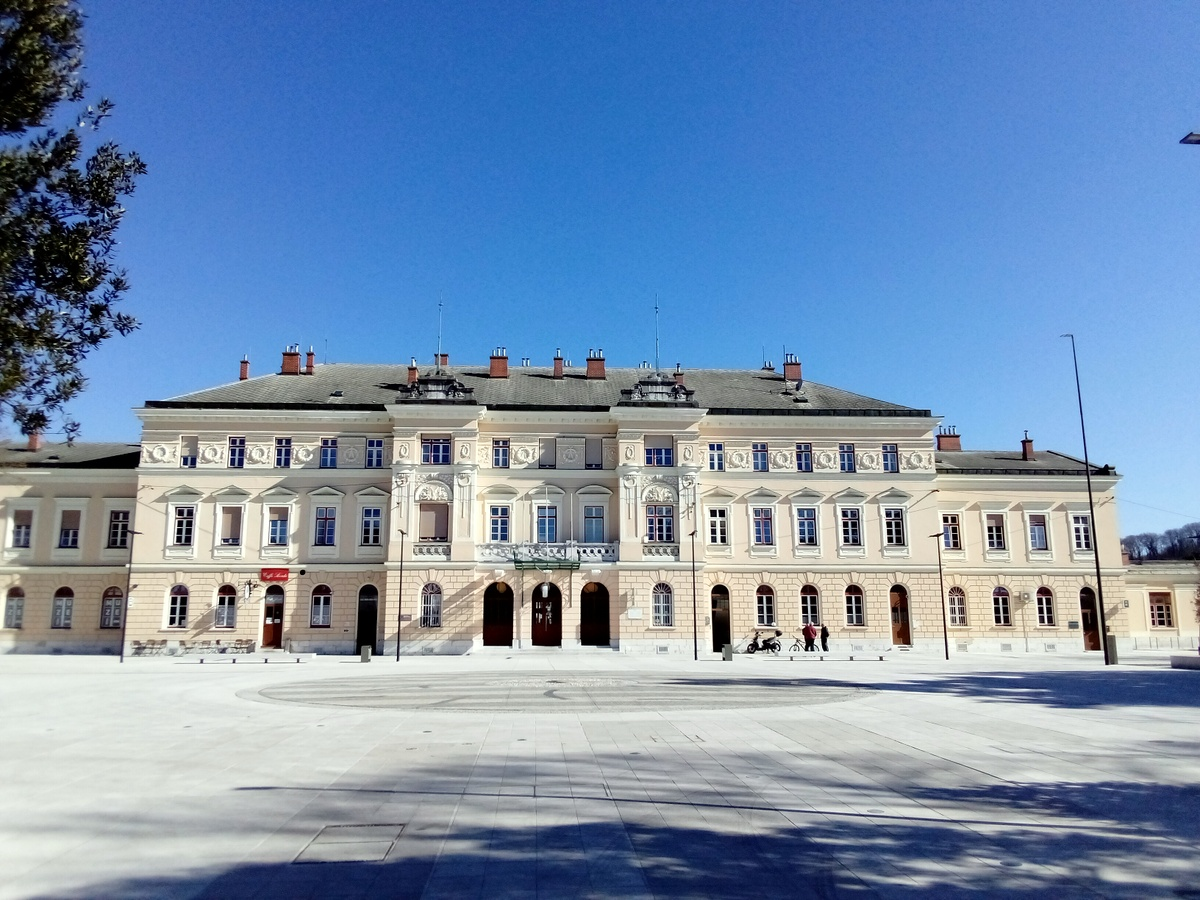

General information
- Location: Europe Square; 5000 Nova Gorica; Slovenia
- Coordinates: 45°57′18″N 13°38′07″E
- Owner: Slovenske železnice
- Operator: Slovenske železnice
- Line: Jesenice–Trieste

History
- Opened: 23 July 1906
Location
- Location within Slovenia

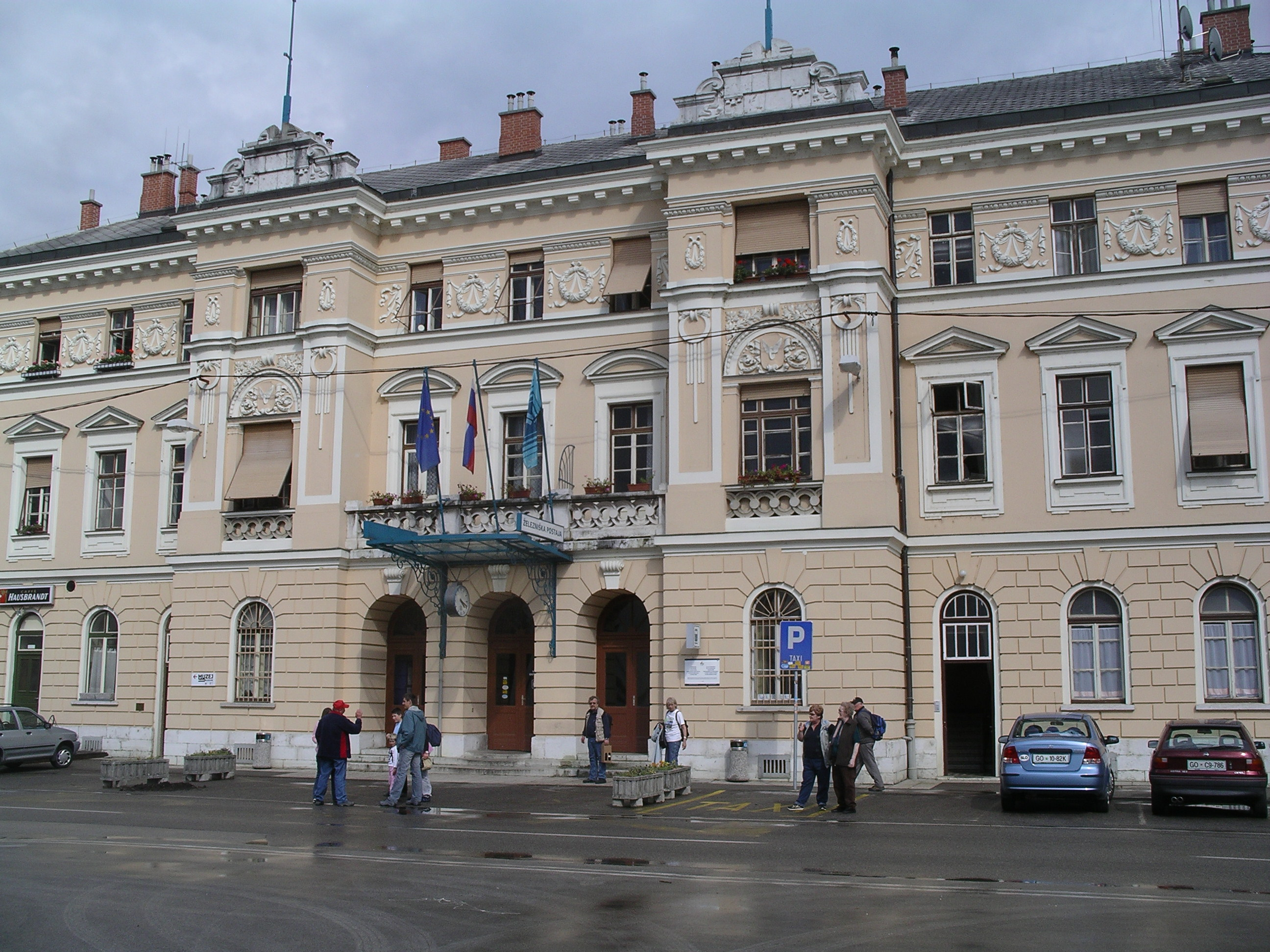
Station building, in front of Europe Square / Transalpina Square. This image is taken from the centre of the square, which is crossed by the Italian–Slovene border.

Nova Gorica railway station (Slovene: Železniška postaja Nova Gorica; Italian: Stazione di Nova Gorica) serves the town and municipality of Nova Gorica, in the Slovenian Littoral region of Slovenia, and is also accessible from the town of Gorizia, Italy.

The station forms part of the Bohinj Railway, between Jesenice, Slovenia, and Trieste, Italy. Due to its geographical position, it has undergone several changes of nationality and name.

From its opening in 1906 until 1919, the station was located within the Austrian Empire, and was named Görz Staatsbahnhof (English: Gorizia station of the State Railways). In 1919, as part of border changes following World War I, it was annexed by the Kingdom of Italy, and renamed Stazione di Gorizia Nord. In 1923, the station was renamed again, this time as Stazione di Gorizia Montesanto.

In 1947, control of the station passed to the Socialist Federal Republic of Yugoslavia, with the station being located within the Socialist Republic of Slovenia, and renamed Železniška postaja Nova Gorica. Slovenia became independent in 1991, but on that occasion the station was not renamed. The station is currently owned and operated by Slovenske železnice (SZ).

== Location ==
The main station building faces the Transalpina Square (Italian: Piazza della Transalpina, Slovene: Trg Evrope), which has formed part of the border between Nova Gorica and Gorizia since 1947.

== History ==
=== Austrian period ===
The station was opened on 23 July 1906, upon the inauguration of the Jesenice–Trieste (or Bohinj Railway) section of the network of railway lines known as the Transalpine Railway (German: Neue Alpenbahnen; Italian: Ferrovia Transalpina). At that time, the station served Gorizia (German: Görz), which was then within the Austrian Empire.

The Transalpine Railway network was built at the beginning of the twentieth century by the Austro-Hungarian Empire, to improve the links between its interior and the Port of Trieste, by connecting the city of České Budějovice, in the present day Czech Republic, with the city of Trieste, then also in the Austrian Empire. The management of the network and its rolling stock was initially entrusted to the Imperial Royal Austrian State Railways.

The station was originally named Görz Staatsbahnhof (English: Gorizia station of the State Railways), to distinguish it from Gorizia's main station, Görz Südbahnhof (English: Gorizia South station), which formed part of the Udine-Trieste railway and was managed by the Austrian Southern Railway, a private company. The two stations were joined by a connecting line that partially used the existing railway line between Gorizia and Ajdovščina (German: Haidenschaft, Italian: Aidussina).

During World War I, given its proximity to the war front, the station's passenger building was severely damaged.

=== Italian period ===
In 1918, upon the reallocation of the territories of the Julian March to the Kingdom of Italy, control of the Bohinj Railway between Podbrdo and Trieste became the responsibility of the Ferrovie dello Stato (FS). Under the management of the FS, the main task was the rebuilding of the passenger building according to the original plans. Additionally, the station's name was changed twice, initially to Stazione di Gorizia Nord (English: Gorizia North), and in 1923 to Stazione di Gorizia Montesanto (English: Gorizia Holy Mountain).

With the entry of Italy into World War II in 1940 and especially during the invasion of Yugoslavia in 1941, the station played an important role in the transport of men and resources directed to the front or back from it. In 1943, the railway premises were occupied by the Germans.

=== German period ===
From 1943 to 1945 the station was operated by the Deutsche Reichsbahn-Gesellschaft. It was a strategic point in the transport of Jews and partisans to concentration camps, including Auschwitz, Mauthausen, Theresienstadt and Risiera di San Sabba. The partisans were captured Slavs usually sent to the Island of Rab or Risiera di San Sabba.

=== Yugoslav period ===
Under the Paris Peace Treaties, 1947, the eastern territories of the province of Gorizia went to Yugoslavia, as did the eastern districts of Gorizia and the railway line between the Bohinj Railway at Podrbrdo and Villa Opicina.

The management of the station then passed to Yugoslav Railways, under its Ljubljana division. The square in front of the passenger building was divided between the two states by the so-called Wall of Gorizia. On the pediment of the passenger building, which faced directly towards Italy, was placed a red star, symbol of socialism.

Yugoslav Railways renamed the station Železniška postaja Nova Gorica to indicate that a new municipality would be built in the eastern districts of Gorizia, and also rebuilt the line between Gorizia and Montesanto Prvačina. The station's connection with Udine and Trieste was cut at the border near the Gorizia San Marco railway station (Slovene: Železniška postaja Vrtojba), which was placed between the two railway administrations and was located in Yugoslav territory.

In 1960, the connection with the Gorizia Centrale railway station was reopened, and a passenger service began operations using FS rolling stock.

=== Slovenian period ===
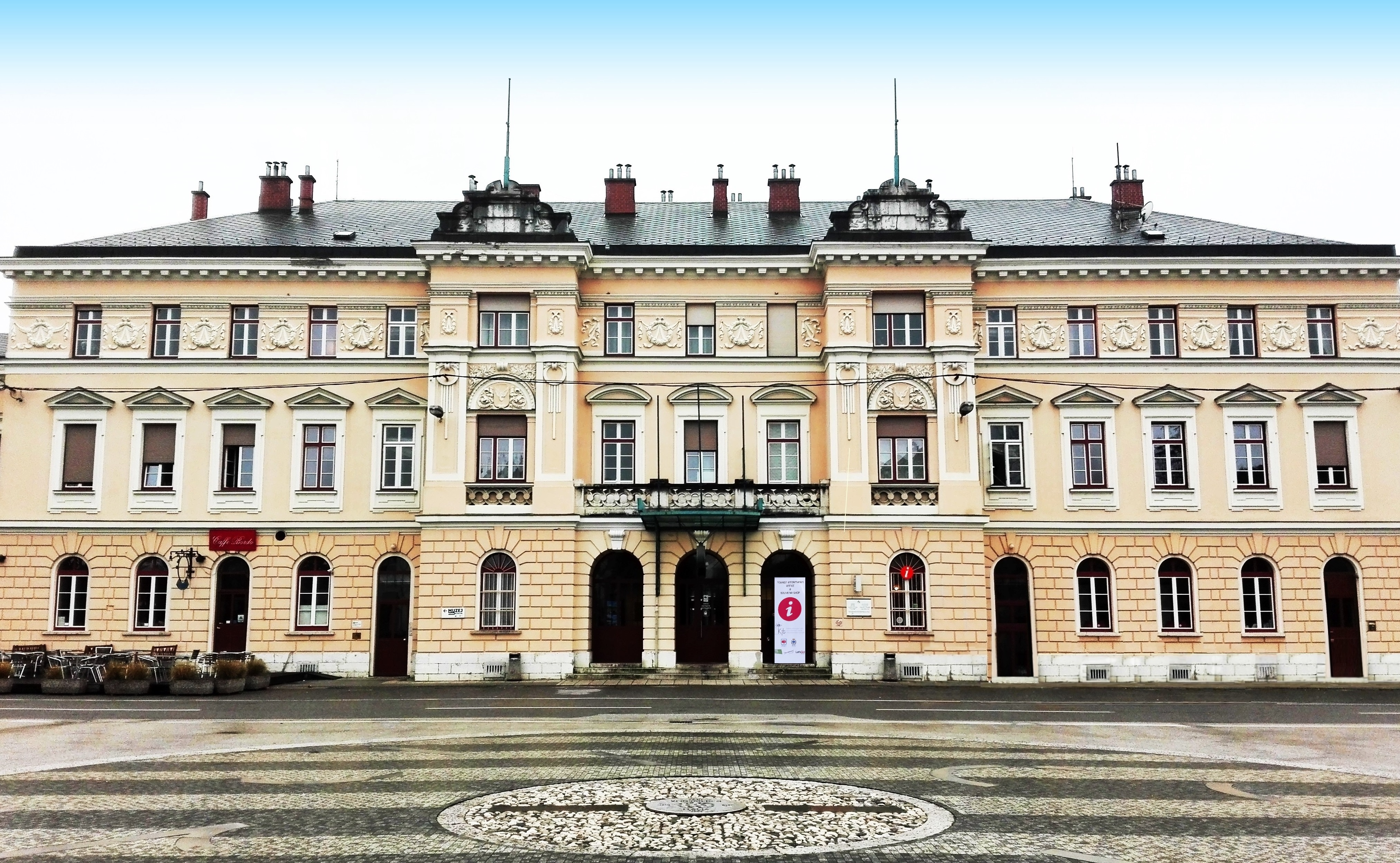
Nova Gorica, the railway station

With Slovenian independence in 1991, the station and railway line passed to Slovenian Railways. In December 1991, the communist red star on the station pediment was modified to represent a Christmas star. Soon afterward, it was removed. Transalpina Square was divided between Italy and the new state of Slovenia.

In 2004, when Slovenia joined the European Union, all border markers on the square were removed, and the Wall of Gorizia that had divided it in two was demolished. In 2007, when Slovenia entered the Schengen area, the last formal customs controls were eliminated and the square was reunited.

== Facilities and equipment ==
In addition to the passenger building, the station is equipped with a locomotive shed, a turntable and a State Border Museum.
