= Via del San Gabriele-Erjavčeva ulica =

Via del San Gabriele and Erjavčeva ulica is the main urban road linking together Gorizia and Nova Gorica, a city that used to be a single unit and now it's divided between Slovenia and Italy.

The Italian side is named after the mount where a harsh battle between Italy and Austria-Hungary was won by the Italians, while the Slovene side is named after writer Fran Erjavec.

== History ==
In the undivided Gorizia, the road was called via del Camposanto, since it linked the city centre to the Grassigna Cemetery, built in the 1880s and destroyed in World War I: that name was kept by the Italians who conquered the city until the end of the 1930s, when it was named after the mount San Gabriele, where the Eleventh Battle of the Isonzo was fought.

When Italy lost the Eastern side of Gorizia after World War II the road was initially kept closed, as the Udine Agreements providing for local border transit had no provision for a border crossing in the city, but there was a special opening in 1971 to allow the Giro d'Italia to have its first leg in Jugoslavia.

When the Treaty of Osimo definitively marked the border between the two countries a border crossing was opened, allowing to reach Transalpina/Europe Square from Italy, and it became one of the main crossings: when Slovenia got independence the crossing remained under Slovene administration until 2007, when the country joined the Schengen Area and border checks were stopped in ordinary circumstances.

== Characteristics ==
The road starts at a roundabout in Gorizia as via del San Gabriele and it runs for 440 meters up until the border crossing, when it becomes Erjavčeva ulica: after some meter there is a level crossing for the Bohinj Railway, then it runs for 1,2 kilometers up ultin another roundabout which is nearby Edvard Kardelj Square, the main square in Nova Gorica.

There is a bike path on all the road, originally it was just on the Slovene side but when the border opened it was decided to extend it into Italy.
