= Maks Klodič-Sabladoski =

Slovenian civil engineer and painter

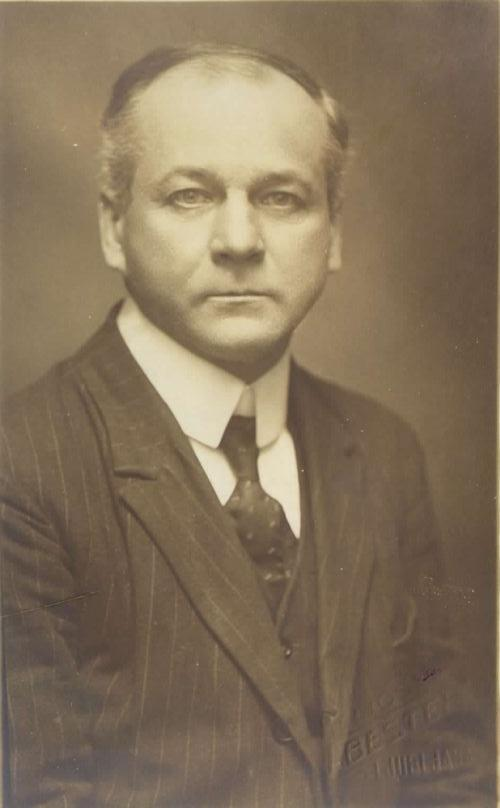
Portrait of Maks Klodič in 1927

Maks Izidor Klodič Ritter von Sabladoski (13 August 1875 – 11 November 1953) was a Slovenian civil engineer.

He was born in Trieste, Austria-Hungary, to the pedagogue and public servant Anton Klodič and Matilda née Pagliaruzzi. His mother came from a Carniolan noble family of Venetian origin but of Slovene national identity, while his father was ennobled when Maks was four years old, acquiring the noble title Ritter von Sabladoski (vitez Sabladoski in Slovene). Maks got his middle name, Izidor, after his maternal grandfather Izidor Pagliaruzzi, a Slovenian politician, mayor of Kobarid and member of the Provincial Diet of Gorizia and Gradisca.

Klodič completed his elementary studies in Trieste and enrolled in the Imperial and Royal Naval Academy in Fiume. After finishing his high school studies at the Realgymnasium (technical high school) in Gorizia in 1894, he enrolled at the Vienna Technical University graduating in 1901 with a thesis on railway engineering, a subject on which he spent most of his professional life.

In the early 1900s, he was the chief engineer of the Bohinj Railway, which included the construction of the Solkan Bridge, with the hitherto largest stone arch in the world. After World War One, he moved to the Kingdom of Serbs, Croats and Slovenes and continued his work on railways, publishing several monographs on the subject. He died in Ljubljana and is buried in Žale cemetery. In his youth, he was also a marine painter like his brother, Paolo Klodic. He would sign his art as Max Klodic.

Klodič was married to Mina Miczuda, an Austrian noblewoman of Polish descent, with whom he had three children. His granddaughter Neda Klodič was married to engineer Anton Jež, Dachau concentration camp survivor and author.

In 2017, the Slovenian Railways named one of its passenger coaches after Maks Klodič, with his image painted on the outside and information on his life in the inside of the car.
