= Gorizia Centrale railway station =

Railway station in Italy

Gorizia
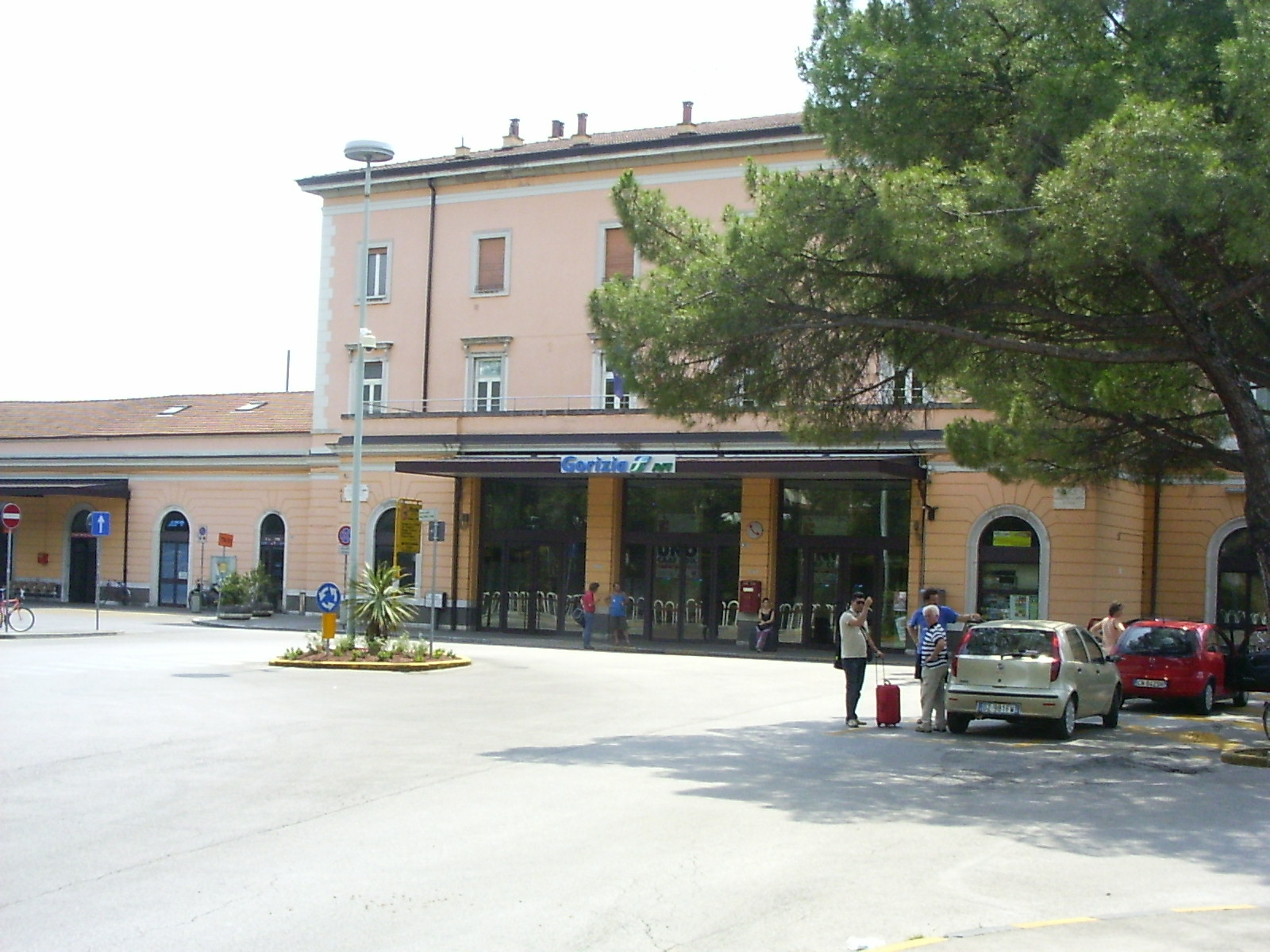
- The main entrance.

General information
- Location: Piazzale Martiri per la Libertà d'Italia; 34170 Gorizia GO; Gorizia, Gorizia, Friuli-Venezia Giulia; Italy
- Coordinates: 45°55′58″N 13°36′27″E
- Operator: Rete Ferroviaria Italiana; Centostazioni
- Lines: Udine–Trieste; Gorizia-Nova Gorica railway Gorizia–Ajdovščina (closed 1993)
- Distance: 32.682 km (20.308 mi) from Udine
- Train operators: Trenitalia
- Connections: Local buses

Other information
- Classification: Silver

History
- Opened: 1 October 1860; 165 years ago
Location
- Location within Friuli-Venezia Giulia Location within Northern Italy Location within Italy

Gorizia Centrale railway station (Italian: Stazione di Gorizia Centrale; German: Görz Südbahnhof (former name)) is the main station serving the town and comune of Gorizia, in the autonomous region of Friuli-Venezia Giulia, northeastern Italy.

== Overview ==
Opened in 1860, the station forms part of the Udine–Trieste railway, and is also a junction station for an international branch line linking Gorizia with Ajdovščina in nearby Slovenia.

The station is currently managed by Rete Ferroviaria Italiana (RFI). However, the commercial area of the passenger building is managed by Centostazioni. Train services to and from the station are operated by Trenitalia. Each of these companies is a subsidiary of Ferrovie dello Stato Italiane (FS), Italy's state-owned rail company.

== Location ==
Gorizia Centrale railway station is situated at Piazzale Martiri per la Libertà d'Italia, at the southwestern edge of the city centre.

== History ==
The station was opened on 1 October 1860, upon the inauguration of the Cormons–Galleria section of the Udine–Trieste railway. Located at that time in the territory of the Austrian Empire, the station then had the dual name of Görz/Gorizia and was operated by the Imperial Royal Privileged Southern Railway Company of Austria, Venice and central Italy (German: Kaiserlich königliche privilegierte Südbahngesellschaft).

In 1902, the station became a junction station for the branch line to Ajdovščina (Italian: Aidussina; German:Haidenschaft), built by the Austrian imperial society Localbahn Görz-Haidenschaft, which awarded management rights to the Südbahngesellschaft.

Four years later, upon the opening of the Jesenice-Trieste railway (part of the network of railway lines known as the Transalpine Railway), the station took on the dual designation of Görz Südbahnhof/Gorizia Meridionale, to distinguish it from its counterpart on the new line, the Görz Staatsbahnhof/Gorizia stazione delle ferrovie dello stato (now the Nova Gorica railway station). The two systems were connected by a short rail link using part of the branch line to Ajdovščina.

Under the Treaty of Saint-Germain-en-Laye (1919), the two stations went to the Kingdom of Italy, and the FS became the operator of both. Over the next twelve years, the station on the Udine-Trieste railway changed its name several times: initially it retained only its Italian name Gorizia Meridionale, then it became Gorizia Campagnuzza, and since 1923 it has been Gorizia Centrale.

== Features ==
Inside the station, there are ticket windows, ticket machines, a lounge, a bar, a newsagency, and passport photo machines.

All the regional trains travelling on the Udine-Trieste railway stop at the station, and some of them terminate there.

== Train services ==
The movement of passengers is about 1.4 million people a year, which means that the station is the fifth busiest station in Friuli-Venezia Giulia in terms of numbers of passengers.

The station is served by the following service(s):

- Night train (Intercity Notte) Rome - Bologna - Venice - Udine - Trieste
- Express services (Regionale Veloce) Venice - Treviso - Udine - Gorizia - Trieste
- Regional services (Treno regionale) Venice - Treviso - Udine - Gorizia - Trieste

== See also ==
- History of rail transport in Italy
- List of railway stations in Friuli-Venezia Giulia
- Rail transport in Italy
- Railway stations in Italy
- Nova Gorica railway station
