= Bača pri Modreju =

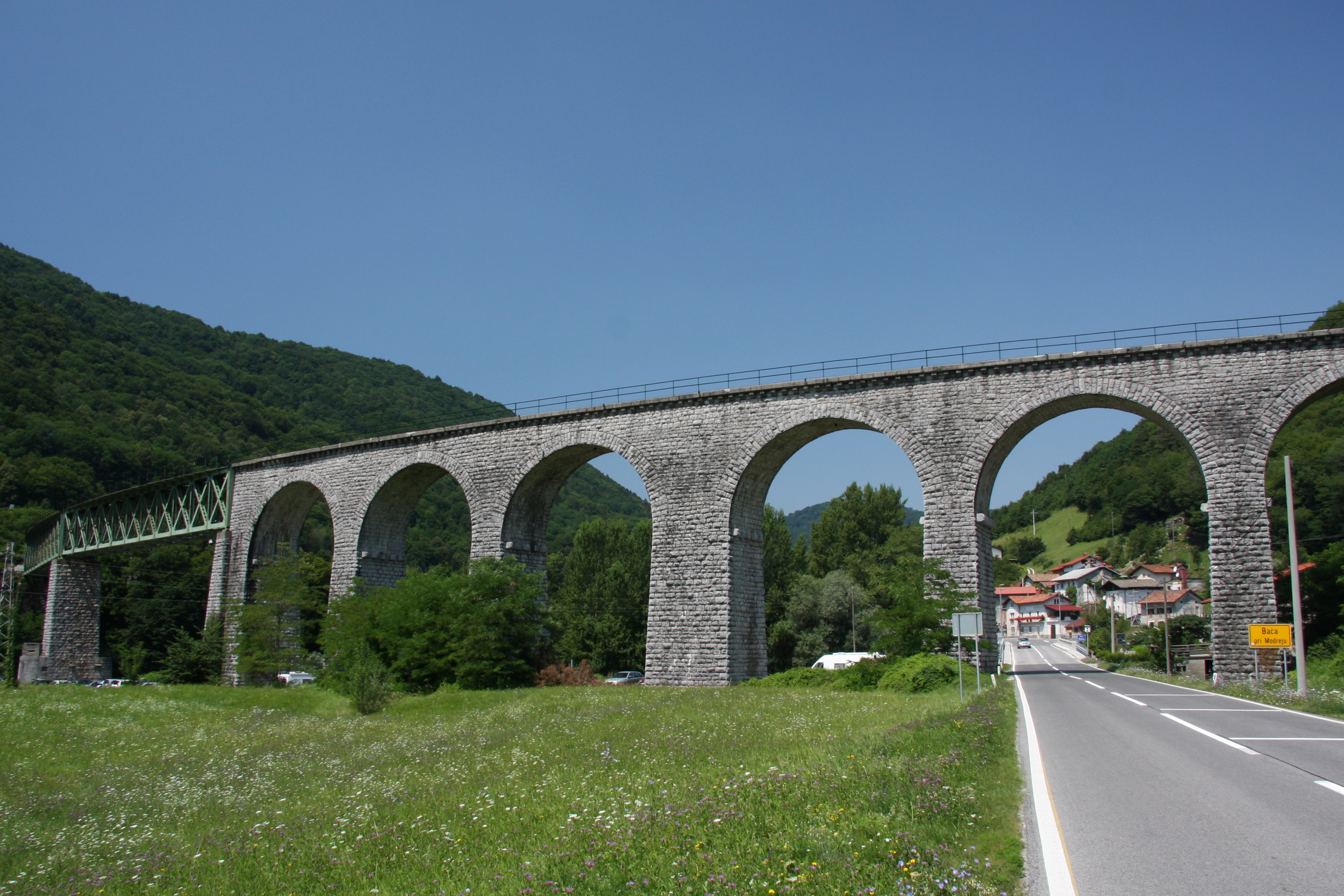

- Location in Slovenia
- Coordinates: 46°8′45.24″N 13°46′0.23″E
- Country: Slovenia
- Traditional region: Slovenian Littoral
- Statistical region: Gorizia
- Municipality: Tolmin

Area
  - Total: 2.95 km^{2} (1.14 sq mi)
- Elevation: 164 m (538 ft)

Population (2002)
  - Total: 153

Bača pri Modreju (pronounced [ˈbaːtʃa pɾi mɔˈdɾɛːju] or [-ˈdɾeːju]; in older sources also Bača pri Modreji) is a village in the Municipality of Tolmin in the Littoral region of Slovenia. It lies at the confluence of the Bača River with the Idrijca River, which in turn joins the Soča River at Most na Soči, northwest of the settlement. The village includes the hamlets of Grapa, Stopec, and Sopotnica.

== Name ==
The name Bača pri Modreju literally means 'Bača near Modrej', distinguishing the village from the settlement of Bača pri Podbrdu (literally, 'Bača near Podbrdo') in the same municipality. Both settlements are named after the Bača River.

== History ==
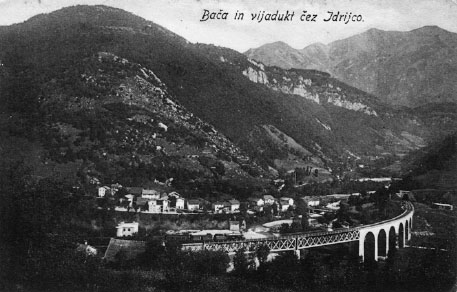
Postcard of Bača and the Bača Viaduct, 1915

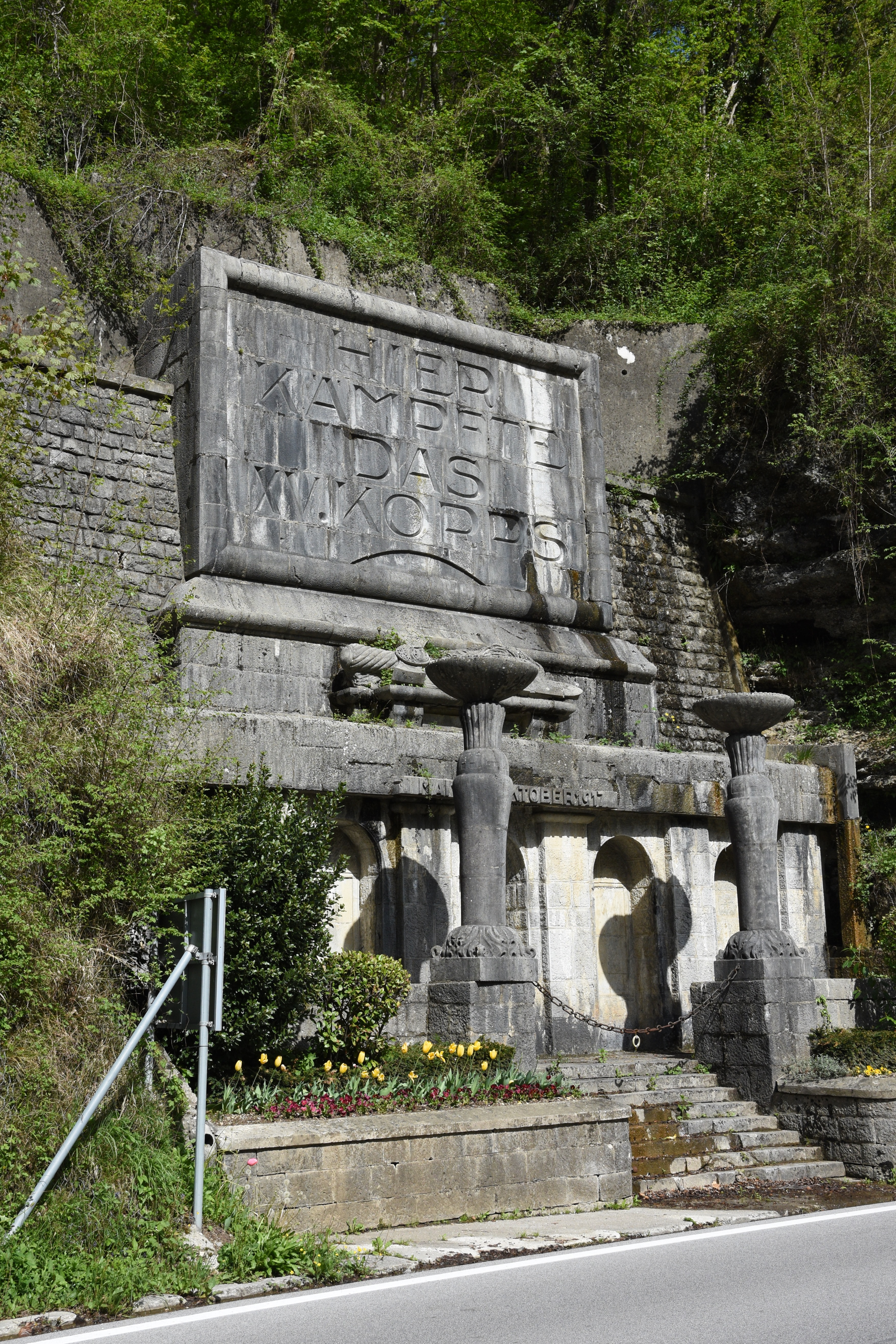
Monument of the First World War

In 1888 the archaeologists Carlo de Marchesetti and Josef Szombathy discovered 23 urn graves with objects from the Hallstatt culture in Bača pri Modreju. The finds are kept at the museums in Vienna and Trieste. During the Middle Ages, the counts of Tolmin had a toll house in the village. There are two abandoned sawmills along the Bača River in the settlement; one was established in 1544. During the First World War, the Austrians built a memorial to their soldiers in the southwest part of the settlement, along the main road next to the railway bridge directly opposite the settlement of Postaja. The inscription reads "Hier kämpfte das XV. Korps. Mai 1915 : Oktober 1917" (The 15th Corps fought here. May 1915–October 1917). After Italy assumed control of the area, the Italians added the inscription "Venne il di nostro – ottobre 1918" (Our day arrived: October 1918).

== Railway bridge ==
There is an imposing railway bridge belonging to the Bohinj Railway over the Idrijca in the settlement and partly in the settlement of Postaja. It is the longest and largest such structure along the entire line and has seven arches.
