= Postaja, Tolmin =

Postaja
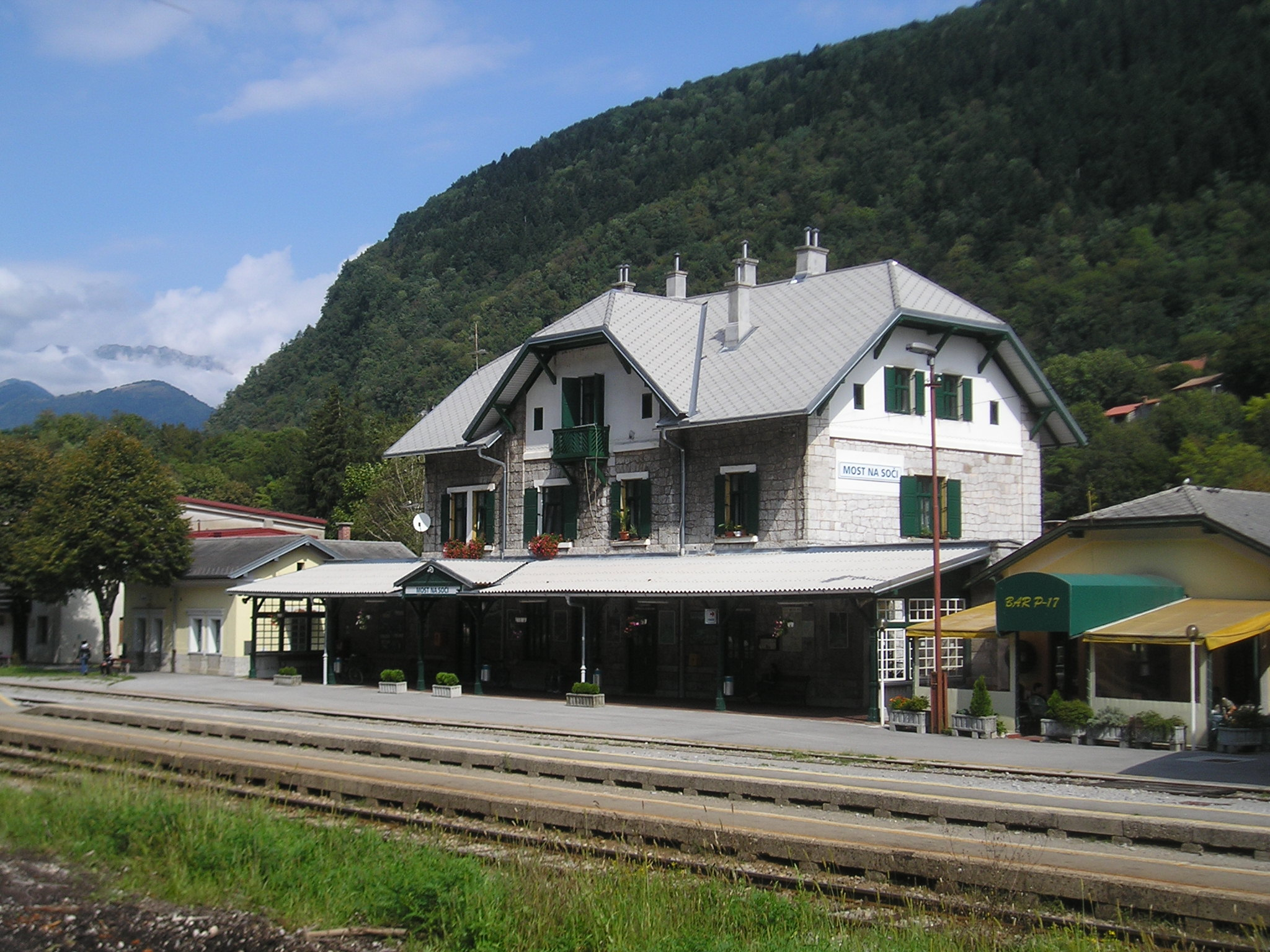

- Location in Slovenia
- Coordinates: 46°8′36.62″N 13°45′51.14″E
- Country: Slovenia
- Traditional region: Slovenian Littoral
- Statistical region: Gorizia
- Municipality: Tolmin

Area
  - Total: 2.17 km^{2} (0.84 sq mi)
- Elevation: 187.5 m (615 ft)

Population (2002)
  - Total: 122

Postaja (pronounced [pɔˈstaːja]) is a settlement on the left bank of the Idrijca River, southeast of Most na Soči, in the Municipality of Tolmin in the Littoral region of Slovenia. It includes the hamlets of Na Lazih (Slovene: Na lazih) and Klohe. The Most na Soči train station is located in Postaja.

== Name ==
Until 1937, Postaja was a hamlet of Sveta Lucija ob Soči (later renamed Most na Soči) and its house numbers were continuous with that of the main town. Postaja received its own house numbering system in 1938 even though it still had no official name, and it was referred to as the "Sveta Lucija ob Soči railroad station" or simply "the station" (Slovene: postaja). The name Postaja became the official name of the settlement in 1952.

== History ==
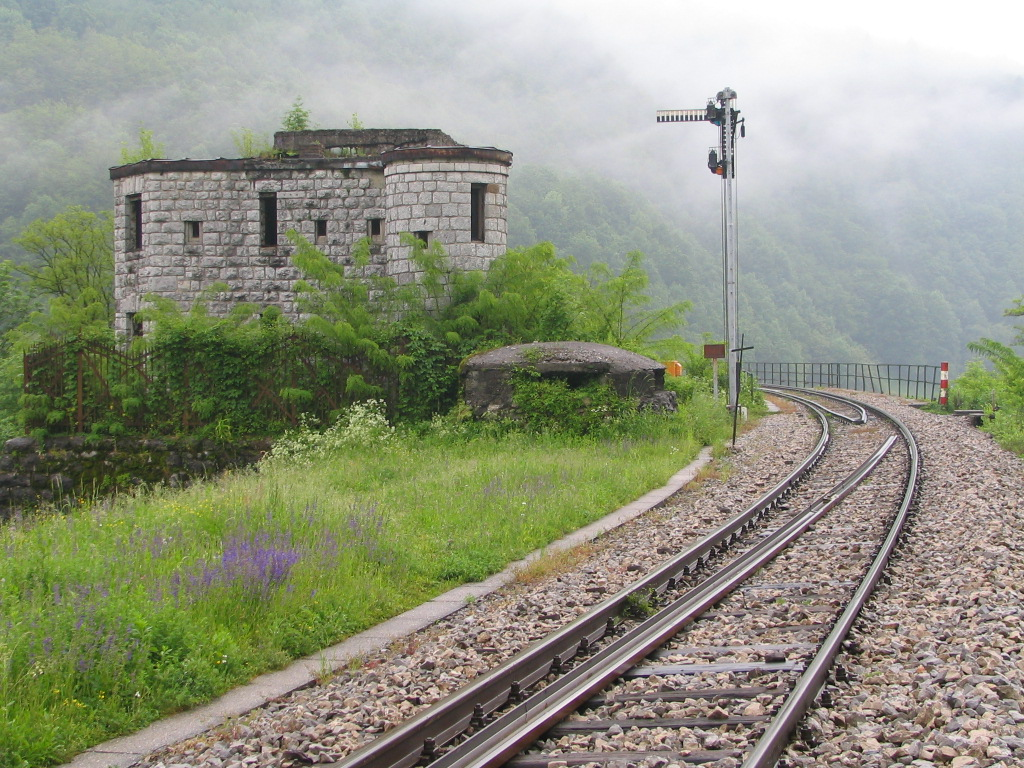
Railroad fortification

The Austrian authorities built a fortification to protect the railroad bridge belonging to the Bohinj Railway on the east edge of the settlement. After the First World War, the fortification was used by the Italian army for housing and to store weapons.

== Railway bridge ==
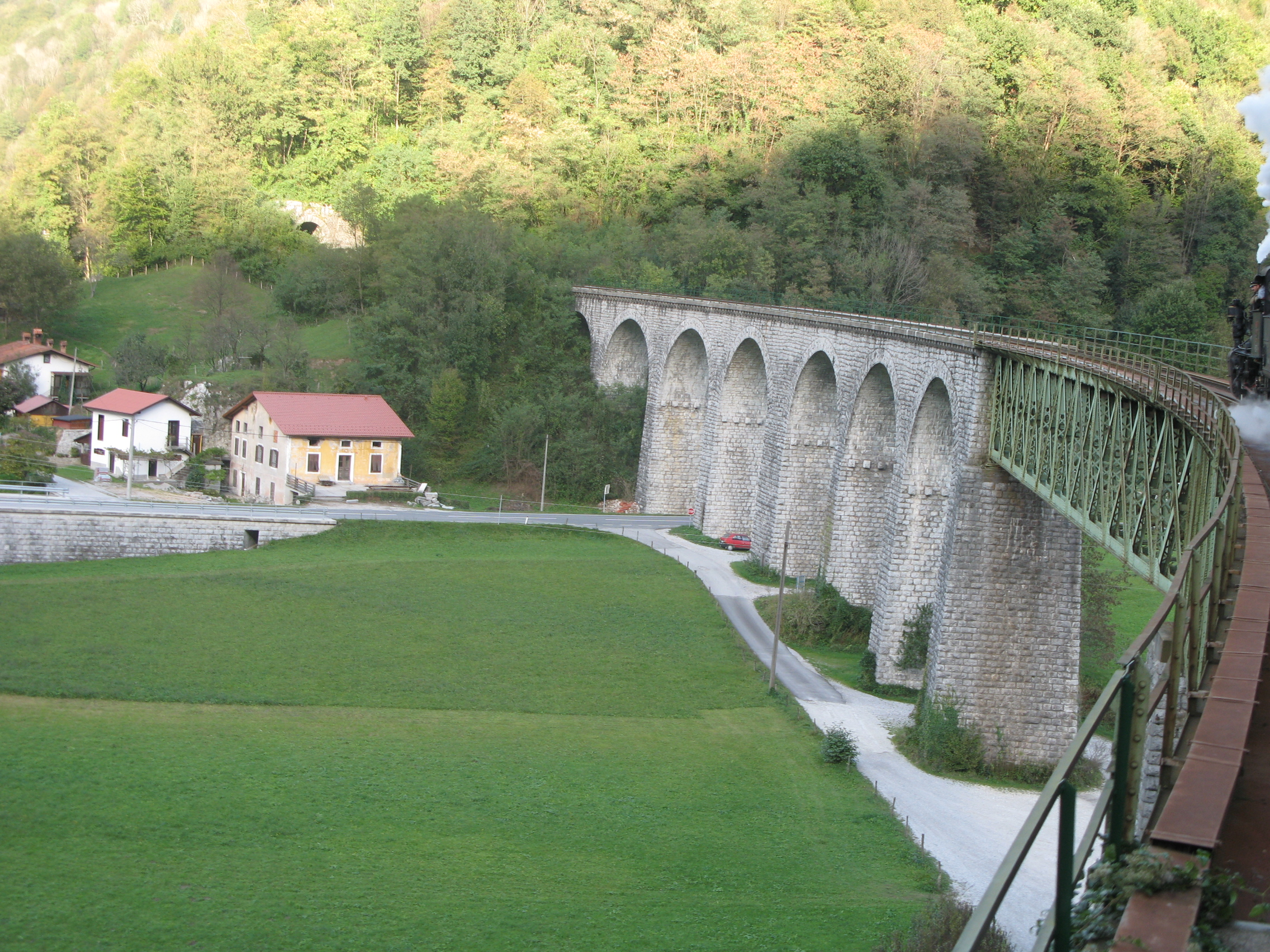
Railway bridge and part of the village of Bača pri Modreju

There is an imposing railway bridge belonging to the Bohinj Railway over the Idrijca in the settlement and in the nearby settlement of Bača pri Modreju. It is the longest and largest such structure along the entire line and has seven arches.
