= Anton Klodič Sabladoski =

Slovenian philologist, poet and pedagogue

Anton Klodič Ritter von Sabladoski (10 November 1836 – 15 February 1914) was a Slovenian philologist, poet and pedagogue. Between 1869 and 1902, he served as the main school inspector for the County of Gorizia and Gradisca, where he was instrumental in establishing a school system in the Slovene language.

He was born in the village of Hlodič (Clodig, in Italian) in the municipality of Grimacco (Garmak in the local Slovene dialect) in what was then the Austrian-administered Kingdom of Lombardy–Venetia. His father Valentin was a freeholder peasant and inn-keeper. His mother Anna, née Sabladoski, was the daughter of a Polish officer in Napoleon's army who had settled in Gorizia and married a local Slovene woman.

He spent much of his childhood under the tutelage of his maternal uncle, Jožef Sabladoski, who served as a priest in nearby Livek and sponsored young Anton's education. He enrolled at the Catholic seminary in Gorizia but dropped out before consecration as a priest. After finishing his studies in classical philology at the University of Vienna, he taught at the gymnasiums in Graz, Split, Trieste and Gorizia.

In 1869, he was appointed by the Austrian Government as the school inspector for the Austrian Littoral where he vigorously promoted the study of both vernacular and classical languages. He published several books on the subjects of education and pedagogy, linguistics and philology.

In 1865, he married the noblewoman Matilda Pagliaruzzi, daughter of Izidor Pagliaruzzi, mayor of Kobarid. Klodič was instrumental in the posthumous publication of the selected works of his brother-in-law, the Slovene poet and writer Josip Pagliaruzzi who died in 1885 at the age of 25. Klodič himself wrote poems and short stories, both in standard Slovene and in his native Natisone dialect.

In 1880, he was granted the Order of the Iron Crown of the 3rd class, and ennobled with the hereditary title of Ritter (translatable as knight) von Sabladoski (vitez Sabladoski or plemeniti Sabladoski in Slovene).

He spent his last years in Trieste where he died in February 1914. He was the father of the renowned marine painter Paolo Klodic who served as the director of the port of Trieste under the Anglo-American administration after World War II, and of Maks Klodič-Sabladoski, the civil engineer who designed much of the Bohinj Railway. He was also the great-grandfather of Slovene entrepreneur Vanja Lokar and economist Aleš Lokar.
