= Bača (river) =

River in Slovenia

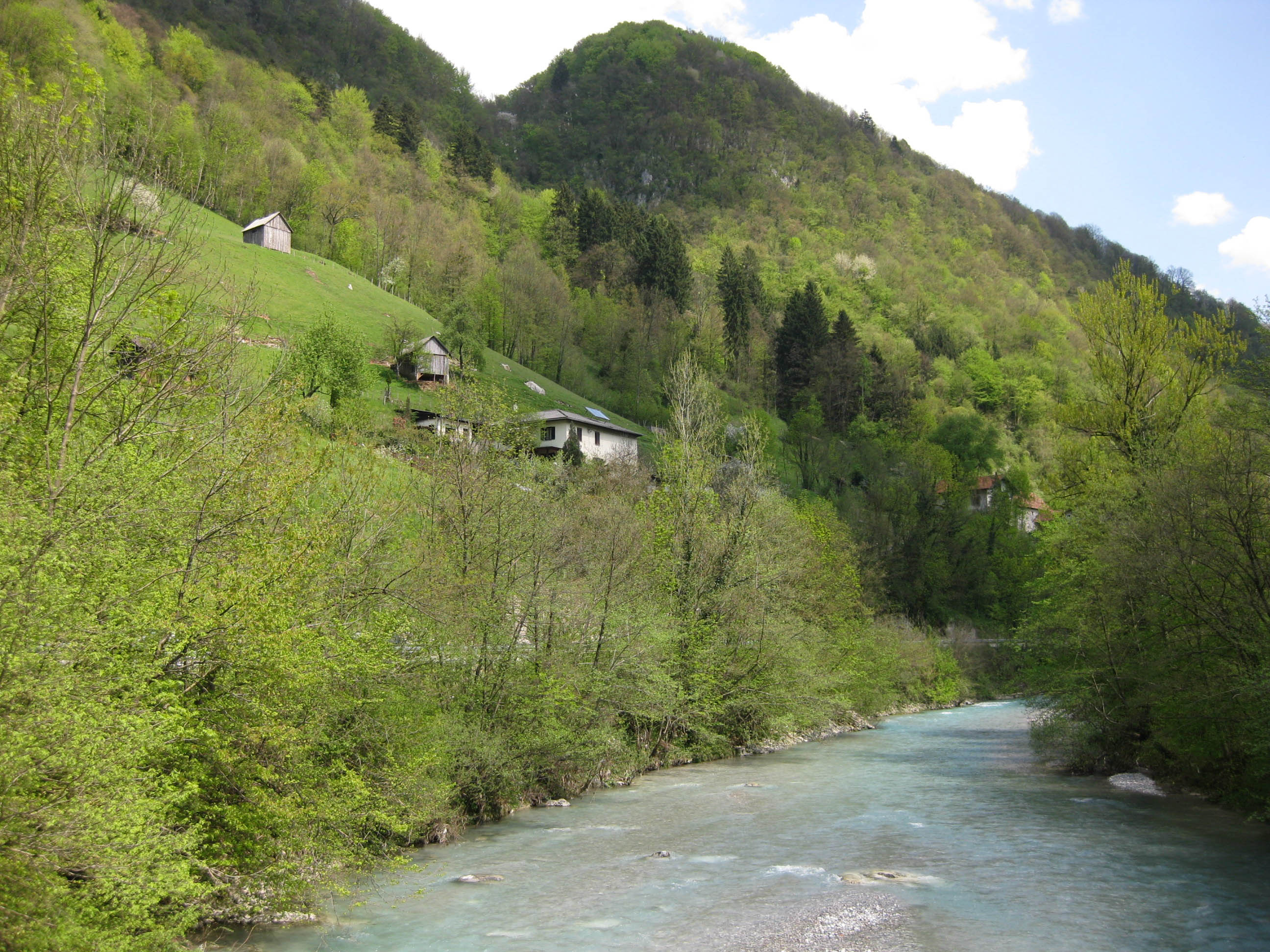
- Lower course of the Bača

Location
- Country: Slovenia

Physical characteristics
- Mouth
  - location: Idrijca
  - coordinates: 46.1447°N 13.7667°E
- Length: 22 km (14 mi)

Basin features
- Progression: Idrijca→ Soča→ Adriatic Sea

The Bača (pronounced [ˈbaːtʃa]) is a river in northwestern Slovenia with a length of 22 km (14 mi). It runs from Bača pri Podbrdu to Bača pri Modreju, where it joins the Idrijca River as its last right tributary. It has a pluvio-nival regime and belongs to the Adriatic Sea Basin.

The Bača River is the basis of the name of the area it flows through, known as the Bača Gorge (Slovene: Baška grapa) or Bača Valley (Slovene: Baška dolina).

== Ecology ==
A survey of the Bača's hyporheic zone—the network of saturated sediments beneath and alongside the stream bed—was carried out in January, March and May 2005. Researchers extracted 10 one-litre samples of sediment–water mixtures from three habitats (shallow hyporheic zone at 30–60 cm depth, deeper hyporheic zone at 60–90 cm and adjacent gravel bars at 60–90 cm) using a piston pump, and concurrently measured temperature, conductivity and dissolved oxygen in both surface and subsurface waters.

The study recovered 21,657 specimens representing 63 taxa, with juvenile copepods (Cyclopoida), early larval stoneflies (Leuctra sp.) and non-biting midges (Chironomidae) most abundant. Taxonomic richness varied from 8.7–14.3 taxa per 10 litres in shallow hyporheic sediments to 14.0–17.5 taxa in deeper layers and peaked at 18.0–21.7 taxa in gravel bars, reflecting the greater physical disturbance of shallower sediments during floods. Despite broadly uniform water chemistry across habitats, differences in sediment composition and flood-driven sediment turnover create a mosaic of more stable, food-rich refuges in deeper and gravel-bar sediments that support higher invertebrate diversity in the River Bača’s hyporheic zone.

== Effects of gravel extraction on invertebrate drift ==
A controlled study of in-stream gravel extraction in October 2004 demonstrated that dredging activities induce a massive downstream drift of benthic and hyporheic invertebrates. During active extraction, drift rates immediately below the excavation site rose to an average of 626 individuals per hour—nearly thirty times the roughly 21 individuals per hour recorded at an upstream control—and remained elevated up to 200 m downstream. The number of taxa drifting increased from about six taxa per hour at the control site to over twelve taxa per hour during extraction, with initial drift dominated by insect larvae but shifting to crustaceans (including groundwater specialists such as Speocyclops and Parastenocaris) by the third day. Even after dredging ceased at night, drift rates and diversity remained higher than background levels, indicating prolonged impacts on the river's invertebrate community.
