= Edvard Kardelj Square =

Edvard Kardelj Square (Slovenian: Trg Edvarda Kardelja) is the main square in Nova Gorica, and it's popularly known as the Meadow (Slovenian: Travnik): it sits where the former Grassigna cemetery, destroyed in World War I, used to be, and in fact Erjavčeva ulica, the main road leading to it, used to be the road linking Gorizia city centre to the graveyard.

Named after the Slovene partisan and politician Edvard Kardelj, on the square there is the Nova Gorica City Hall, the Slovene National Theatre and the Public Library France Bevk.
