= Bača pri Podbrdu =

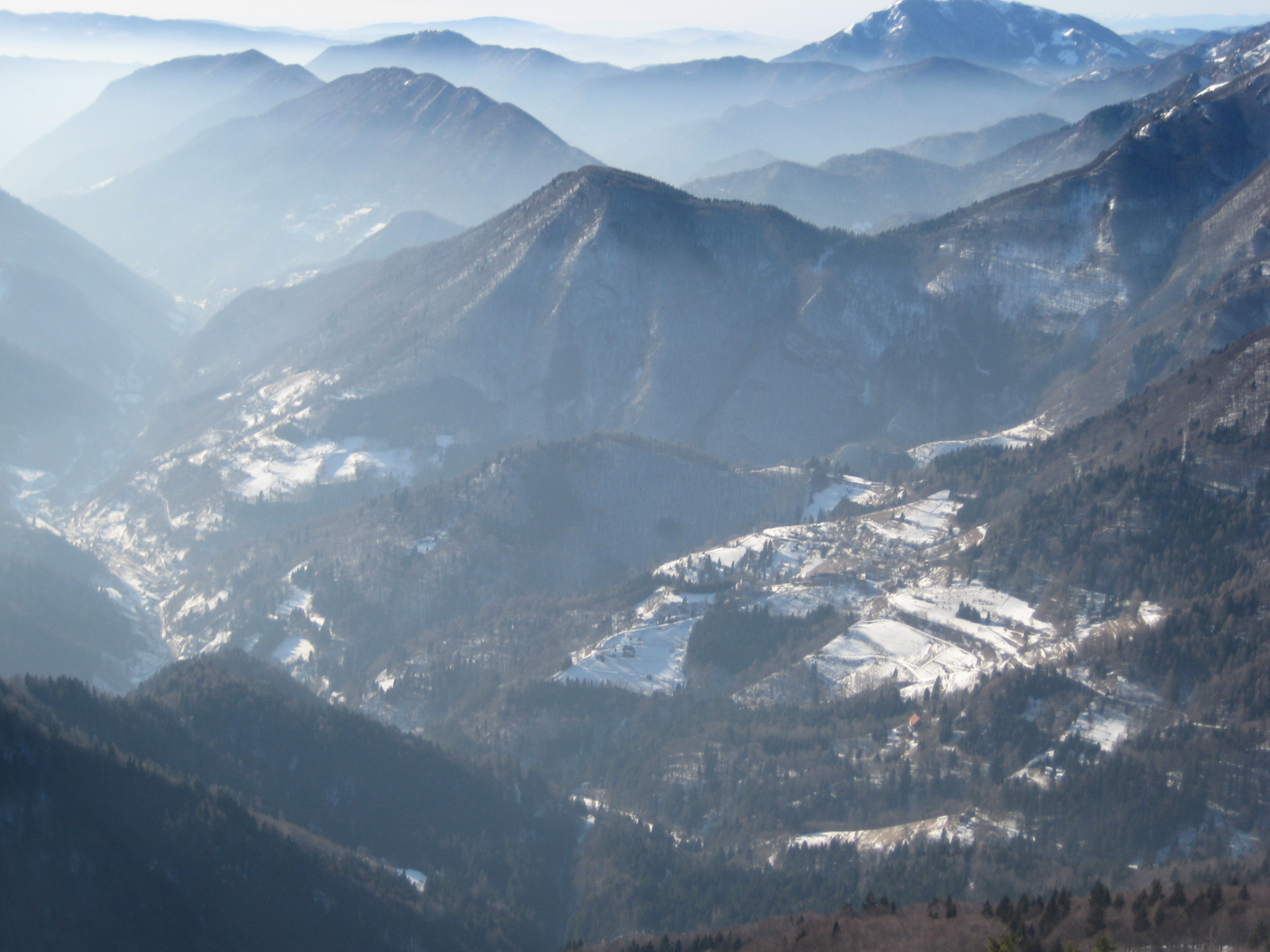

- Location in Slovenia
- Coordinates: 46°13′23.16″N 13°58′11.4″E
- Country: Slovenia
- Traditional region: Slovenian Littoral
- Statistical region: Gorizia
- Municipality: Tolmin

Area
  - Total: 3.99 km^{2} (1.54 sq mi)
- Elevation: 749.6 m (2,459 ft)

Population (2002)
  - Total: 23

Bača pri Podbrdu (pronounced [ˈbaːtʃa pɾi pɔdˈbəɾdu]) is a dispersed settlement above Podbrdo in the Municipality of Tolmin in the Littoral region of Slovenia. It lies on the southern slopes of Mount Kobla and is a popular starting point for hiking trips into the surrounding peaks of the southern Julian Alps.

The local church is dedicated to Saint Leonard and belongs to the Parish of Podbrdo.

== Name ==
The name of the settlement was changed from Bača to Bača pri Podbrdu (literally, 'Bača near Podbrdo') in 1955, distinguishing it from nearby Bača pri Modreju. The settlement was attested as Binchinvel in 1377. The origin of the name Bača is uncertain; it may be derived from the Slavic root *bač-, referring to a wet or damp place, or, less likely, from a personal name.
