= Podbrdo railway station =

Railway station in Slovenia

Podbrdo
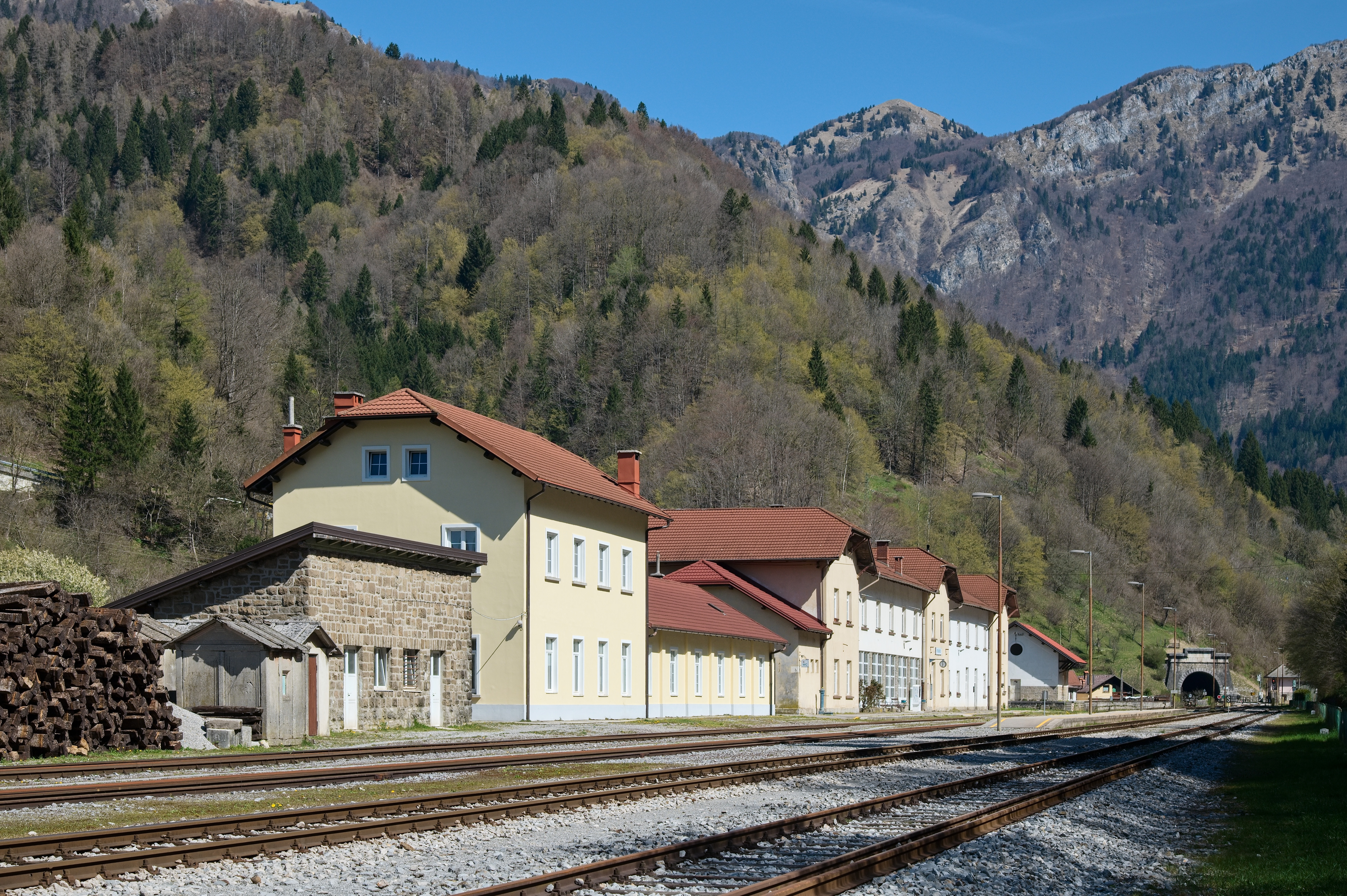

General information
- Location: 5243 Tolmin; Slovenia
- Coordinates: 46°12′33″N 13°58′00″E
- Owner: Slovenske železnice
- Operator: Slovenske železnice
- Line: Bohinj Railway

History
- Opened: 19 July 1906
Location
- Location within Slovenia

Podbrdo railway station (Slovene: Železniška postaja Podbrdo; Italian: Stazione di Piedicolle; German: Bahnhof Podberda) serves the settlement of Podbrdo, in the municipality of Tolmin, Slovenia.

== Location ==
The station forms part of the Bohinj Railway between Jesenice, Slovenia, and Trieste, Italy. It is situated at the southern portal of the Bohinj Tunnel, which is the longest railway tunnel in Slovenia (6,327.3 metres (20,759 ft)) and passes underneath Mount Kobla and the Julian Alps drainage divide between the Danube Valley and the Adriatic Sea.

== History ==
The station was opened on 19 July 1906, as Bahnhof Podberda (its German language name). At that time, it was located within the Austrian Empire, and its original operator was the Imperial Royal Austrian State Railways.

After World War I, and the annexation of Podberda to the Kingdom of Italy, the station was renamed Stazione di Piedicolle (its Italian language name). It also became the Bohinj Railway's border crossing point between the Ferrovie dello Stato (Kingdom of Italy) and the Yugoslav Railways (Slovene: Jugoslovanske železnice) of the Kingdom of Yugoslavia.

Soon afterwards, the station yard was enlarged, to facilitate the exchange of locomotives on trains crossing the border.

In 1947, following the end of World War II, the entire area surrounding the station was reassigned to the Socialist Federal Republic of Yugoslavia. The station, renamed Železniška postaja Podbrdo (its Slovenian language name), simultaneously lost its status and importance as a border crossing point.
