= Solkan Bridge =

Arch bridge over the Soča River

Coordinates: 45.978981°N 13.651822°E

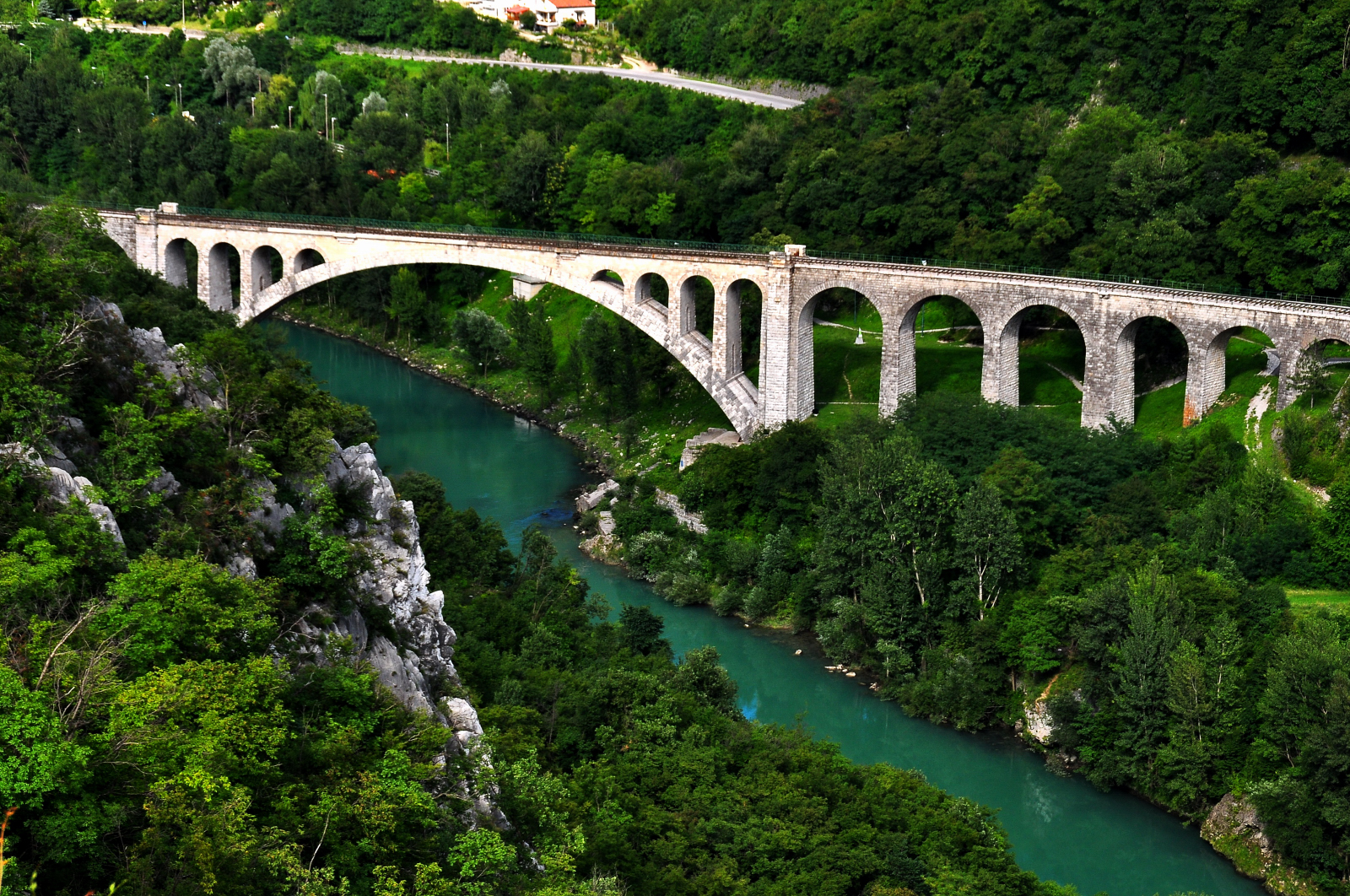
The Solkan Bridge

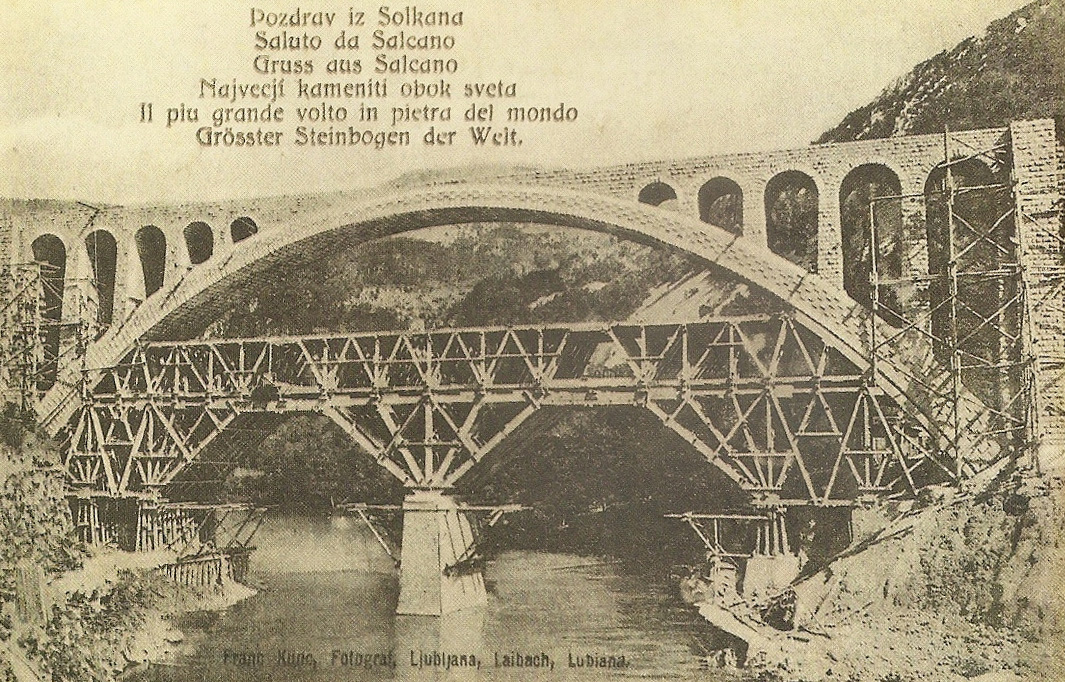
The Solkan Bridge (the photograph is from 1906) originally had five sub-arches.

The Solkan Bridge (Slovene: Solkanski most, Italian: Ponte di Salcano) is a 219.7-meter (721 ft) arch bridge over the Soča River near Nova Gorica in western Slovenia (by railway terminology it is a viaduct). With an arch span of 85 meters (279 ft), it is the world's longest stone arch railroad bridge (and second-longest stone arch bridge, after Germany's Syratal Viaduct, a road bridge). It holds this record because later construction technology used reinforced concrete to build bridges. It was originally built to carry the Bohinj Railway in the time of the Vienna Secession, between 1900 and 1905, and officially opened in 1906.

== Description ==
The bridge was designed by the architect Rudolf Jaussner and engineer Leopold Oerley, initially with an 80-meter (260 ft) stone arch, and built in 1904 and 1905. Its central span was built by the Viennese construction company Brüder Redlich und Berger and the end viaducts were built by the Italian construction company Sard, Lenassi & Co, incorporated in Gorizia for this project by the Italian engineer Giovanni Battista Sard of Turin. Initially a steel arched bridge was planned at this location, but later they decided to build a stone bridge instead.

In the spring of 1904 the builders had to change the project because of the light soil and increased the arch to 85 meters (279 ft). It is built of 4,533 stone blocks.

On July 19, 1906, the Bohinj Railway (Slovene: Bohinjska proga, Italian: Transalpina, German: Wocheiner Bahn) from Jesenice to Gorizia was inaugurated (the Austrian heir Franz Ferdinand travelled across the bridge).

In August 1916, during the First World War, Austrian soldiers destroyed the bridge (using 930 kilograms or 2,050 pounds of Ecrasite) as they left Solkan to prevent the invading forces from using it. After the 12th Isonzo battle the Austrian army built a steel construction where the bridge once stood. After the war in April 1925 the Italians started to build a new bridge, which was finished in 1927. This bridge was very similar to the first one, with the exception of having only four sub-arches instead of the original five.

During the Second World War, the bridge suffered only minimal damage in aerial bombing. On August 10, 1944, bombs missed the bridge; on March 15, 1945, a bomb that hit the bridge did not explode.

== Literature ==
- Gorazd Humar: Kamniti velikan na Soči. Nova Gorica: Branko, 1996, ISBN 961-6079-30-1.
- Gorazd Humar, Bogdan Kladnik: Slovenski Mostovi: Bridges of Slovenia. Part 2: Štajerska, Dolenjska, Gorenjska, Prekmurje. Ljubljana: Zaklad, 2002, ISBN 961-6266-12-8.
- Eduard Jordan (2013): Der Eisbahnviadukt von Solkan/Salcano
- Walther Schaumann: Die Bahnen zwischen Ortler und Isonzo 1914 - 1918. Vom Friedensfahrplan zur Kriegsfahrordnung. Vienna: Bohmann Verlag, 1991.
