= Svetopolk Pivko =

Slovenian aeronautic engineer

- Born: 29 September 1910; Maribor, Austria-Hungary
- Died: 13 October 1987 (aged 77); Belgrade, SR Serbia, SFR Yugoslavia
- Education: Czech Technical University in Prague, University of Belgrade and Saint Cyr Paris
- Occupations: Aeronautic and University professor
- Years active: 1938–1987

Svetopolk Pivko (Serbian Cyrillic: Светополк Пивко; 29 September 1910 – 13 October 1987) was a professor and engineer at the Faculty of Mechanical Engineering and the Faculty of Mathematics in Belgrade, was a colonel of the Yugoslav Air Force deputy commander of JRV, the founder and the first director of the Aeronautical Technical Institute in Žarkovo. In 1961 he was elected a corresponding member of the Serbian Academy of Sciences and Arts (SANU) and from 1976 he was a full member of the Academy.

== Life ==
He was born on 29 September 1910 in Maribor (today Slovenia), where he completed elementary and high school in 1928. He began his studies of mechanical engineering in Prague at the Czech College of Technical Engineering where he studied for two years. Then he moved to Belgrade and ended his studies of mechanical engineering at the Faculty of Technical Engineering, Belgrade University in 1933. After finishing the school for reserve officers, in October 1934 he pursued his specialist studies in France. In Paris, he spent 4 years working in the l'Institut Aérotechnique de Saint-Cyr-l'École (Aerospace technical Institute Saint-Cyr) on his PhD thesis, and in 1938 he was given the PhD title at Sorbonne. He died on in Belgrade on October 13, 1987, as a retired professor at the University of Belgrade and a full member of the Serbian Academy of Sciences and Arts (SASA).

== Career ==
After defending his doctoral dissertation at the Sorbonne, S. Pivko returned to the country and got employment in the construction office and in Zemun-based seaplane and aircraft factory “Zmaj” whose technical director was the already renowned aircraft designer engineer. D. Stankov. “Zmaj” factory was operating until April 1940, when a strike broke out in aviation industry factories. Having participated in the strike (by political affiliation he was a left-winger) in May 1940, as punishment he was sent to a military exercise. In March 1941 he was mobilized as a reserve officer of the Yugoslav army and he participated in war operations from 6 April 1941 to capitulation, when he goes into hiding. He actively participated in the resistance movement as of 1941 in Montenegro, Slovenia and Bosnia, and as an officer of the Yugoslav People's Army (JNA) during the war, he served in Italy and the USSR. He spent a year in Russia as an engineer of the Yugoslav Aviation Assault Regiment in training.

In July 1945 he was appointed assistant to the commander of the Yugoslav Air Force. For more than two years he was in charge of the aerospace technical services and the aviation industry. During this period, he initiated the establishments of the Aeronautical Institute FPRY, while in 1947 S. Pivko, PhD, was appointed the first director of the institute. In 1951 he was reassigned to the Construction Bureau of the General Directorate of the Aviation Industry where he worked for two years as a senior aero dynamics engineer. During the 1953 he returned to the Aeronautical Institute, where he was appointed Deputy Head of the Research Department. He worked in the Institute until 1964 when as a colonel in technical aviation, his service within the JNA ceased.

From 1968 to 1978 upon meeting the legal requirements for retirement, Professor. S. Pivko worked in the Faculty of Mechanical Engineering of the University of Belgrade. On 22 December 1961 he was elected an associate member of the Serbian Academy of Arts and Sciences, and in 1976 he was elected a full member of SASA.

== Research ==
S. Pivko's research started with his specialization in France in Saint Cyr Aerospace Technical Institute, where he worked on problem of vertical flight, using aerodynamic forces generated on the wing aircraft under the influence of the air flow behind the propeller. This is the “Pivko effect phenomenon." The idea that the plane lifts vertically using the air flow generated by the propellers of the engine and moving parts wing, was as of 1937 protected by patent.

Furthermore, he worked on propeller and rotor aerodynamics in high subsonic and supersonic speeds, aerodynamics of helicopters flight in vertical flight and hovering. Another field of study was the aerodynamics of supporting surfaces and the velocity and pressure distribution on wings of various shapes. He experimented and studied the effects of jet emitted near the trailing edge on airfoil lift including the effect of spoilers.

A number of his papers was devoted to the aerodynamics of aircraft propulsion (piston, turbo-prop and turbojet engines). Furthermore, he tackled the problem of air flow through the introduction pipe and exhaustion of combustion gases through a jet exhaust nozzle. He dedicated one of his monographs to the problem of the airfoil ring aerodynamics.

== Teaching ==
He was elected a full-tenured professor at the Faculty of Mechanical Engineering in 1960 and in 1962 he was elected a full-tenured professor at the Faculty of Mathematics in Belgrade. Since he was employed full-time in the Aeronautical Institute, he had the status of part-time full professor at faculties until 1964 when he fully transferred to the University. At the Faculty of Mechanical Engineering he held lectures in the following subjects: Statics, Kinematics, Dynamics, Vibration theory and Design, and at postgraduate degree courses he gave lectures in Analytical mechanics and Aerodynamic aircraft design.

During his work at the Faculty of Engineering he held various positions: Chair of Mechanics Department, he was a member of the Academic Council, a member of the Basic Organization of Associated Labor Council, as well as a member of various boards and committees of the Faculty.

== Gallery ==
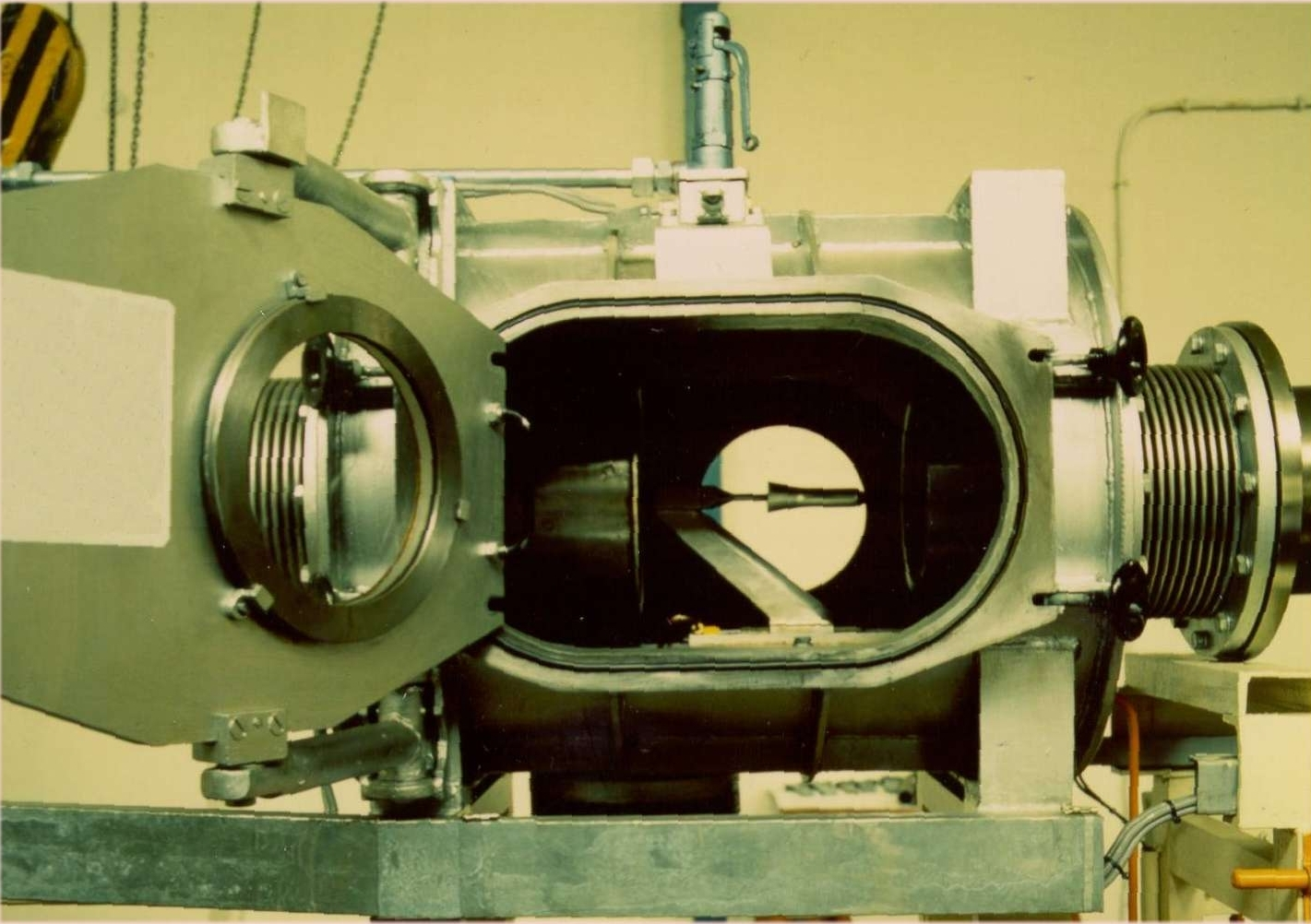
Hipersonic wind tunnel

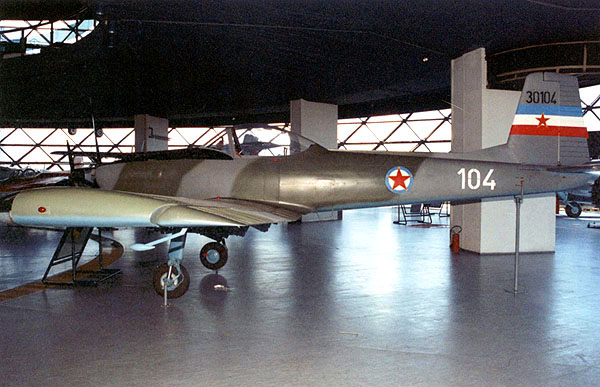
J-20 Kraguj

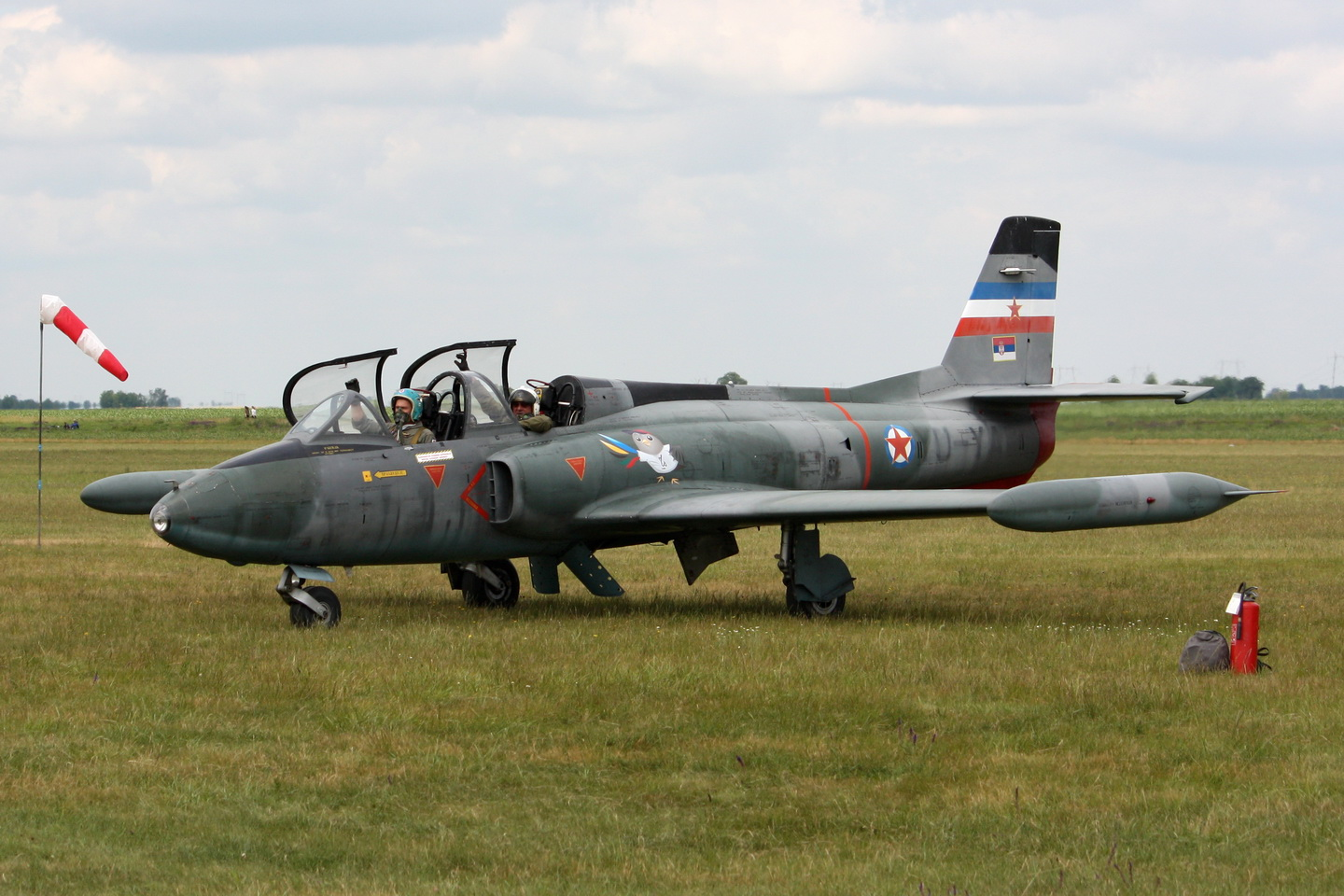
G-2 Galeb

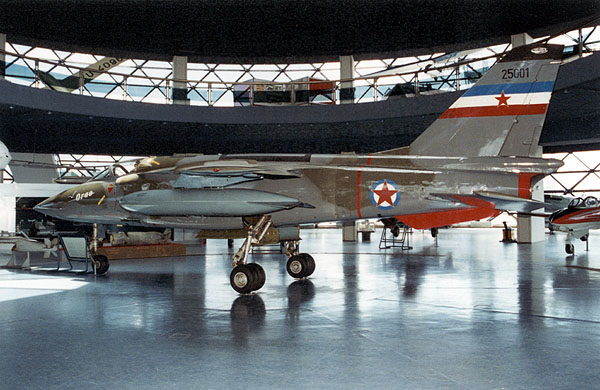
J-22 Orao

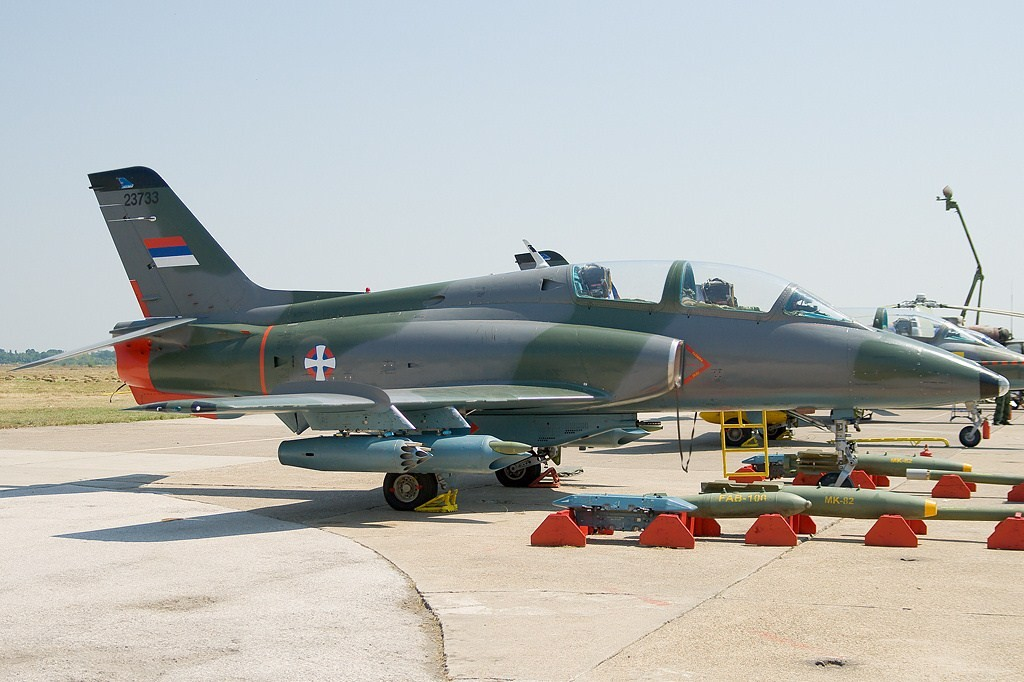
G-4 Super Galeb

== Awards and honors ==
For his dedication academic Svetopolk Pivko received the following awards:

- Medal Army Order II 1974th year
- Order of the Red Flag 1965th year,
- Bearer of several national and international awards and
- Numerous plaques and acknowledgments.

He was also a member of many national and international professional organizations such as:

- Српске академије наука и уметности (САНУ), (Serbian Academy of Sciences and Arts - SASA),
- Југословенског друштва за механику, (Yugoslav Society of Mechanics),
- Member of Board the Association of Engineers and Technicians of Yugoslavia,
- Mathematical Institute of the Serbian
- International Council of the Aeronautical Sciences-ICAS,
- GAMM (Gesellschaft für Angewandte Mathematik und Mechanik)

== Books ==
Professor Svetopolk Pivko has written six books for university undergraduate and graduate studies, and three monographs. His entire literary oeuvre is as follows: 123 scientific papers, 6 books, 3 monographs, 14 technical essays. From a total of 178 published professional papers, 18 were published in editions of SASA, 38 to foreign magazines: 17 in France, 7 in England, 5 in Germany, 4 in the Netherlands and one in Belgium, Switzerland, Romania, USA and Canada.

1. Pivko, Svetopolk. (1938). Contribution à l'étude de l'hélice dans le domaine du point fixe et de son interaction avec l'aile sustentatrice (in French). Paris: La Rougery.
2. Пивко, Светополк. (1949). Примењена Аеродинамика (in Serbian). Београд: Техничка књига.
3. Пивко, Светополк. (1963). Механика 1, Статика (in Serbian). Београд: Научна књига.
4. Пивко, Светополк. (1964). Механика 2, Кинематика (in Serbian). Београд: Научна књига.
5. Пивко, Светополк. (1966). Механика 3, Динамика (in Serbian). Београд: Научна књига.
6. Пивко, Светополк. (1971). Механика Последипломски курс (in Serbian). Београд: Машински факултет.
7. Пивко, Светополк. (1977). Аеродинамика прстенастог крила (in Serbian). Београд: Српска академија наука и уметности.
8. Пивко, Светополк. (1978). Аеродинамика погона ваздухоплова (in Serbian). Београд: Машински факултет у Београду.
9. Пивко, Светополк. (1982). Основи аеродинамичког обликовања ваздухоплова (in Serbian). Београд: Српска академија наука и уметности.

== See also ==
- Aeronautical Technical Institute
- Serbian Academy of Sciences and Arts
