= Transalpina/Europe Square =

Square divided between the towns of Gorizia, Italy and Nova Gorica, Slovenia

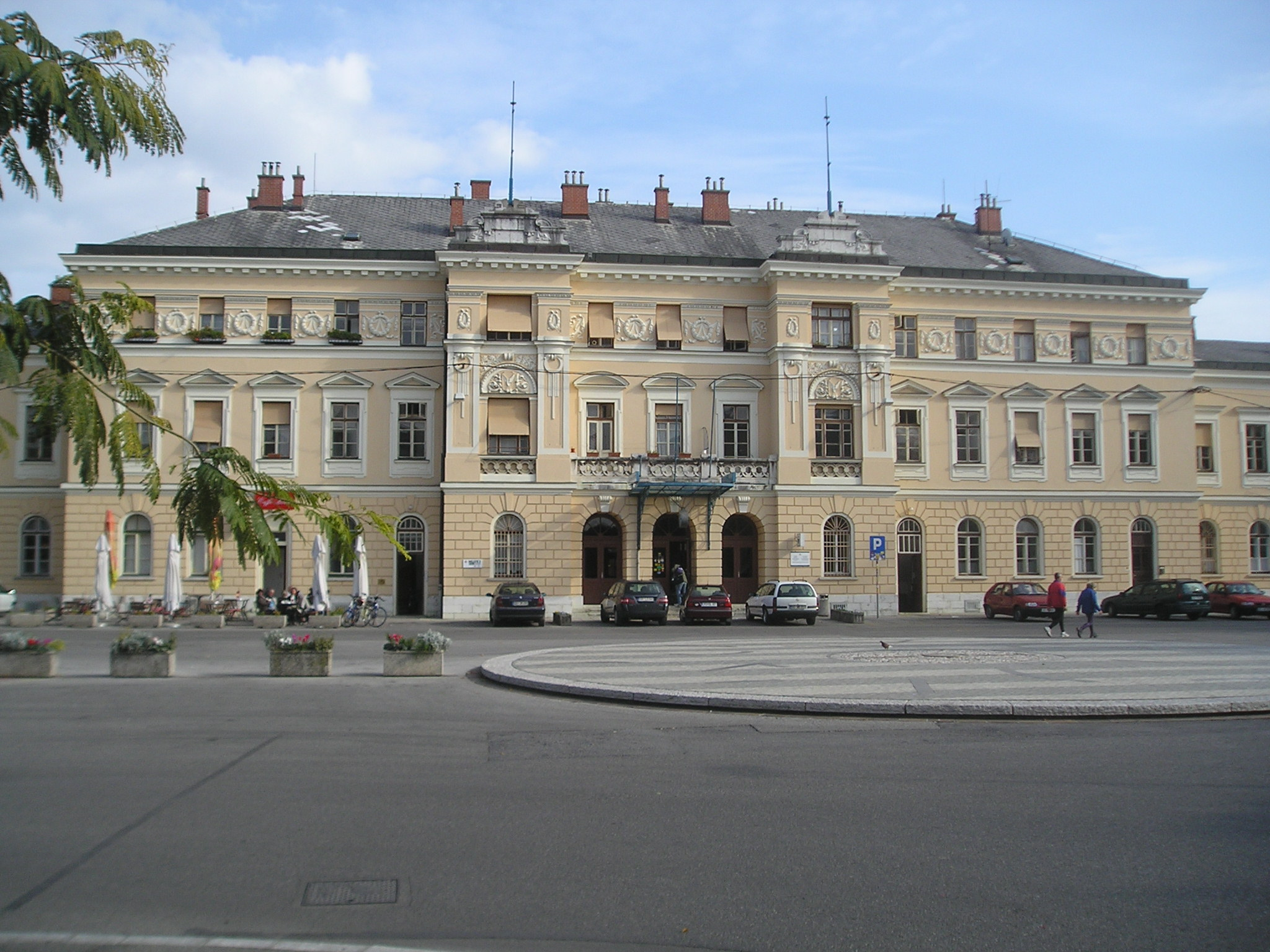
- Nova Gorica railway station and the middle of the square
- Native name: Piazza della Transalpina (Italian); Trg Evrope (Slovene)
- Namesake: Transalpina Railway; Europe
- Location: Gorizia, Italy; Nova Gorica, Slovenia
- Coordinates: 45°57′18″N 13°38′05″E

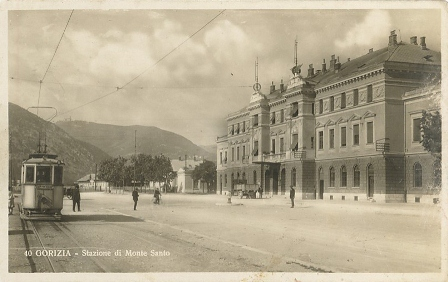
The station in early 20th century, when it was crossed by Gorizia Tramway.

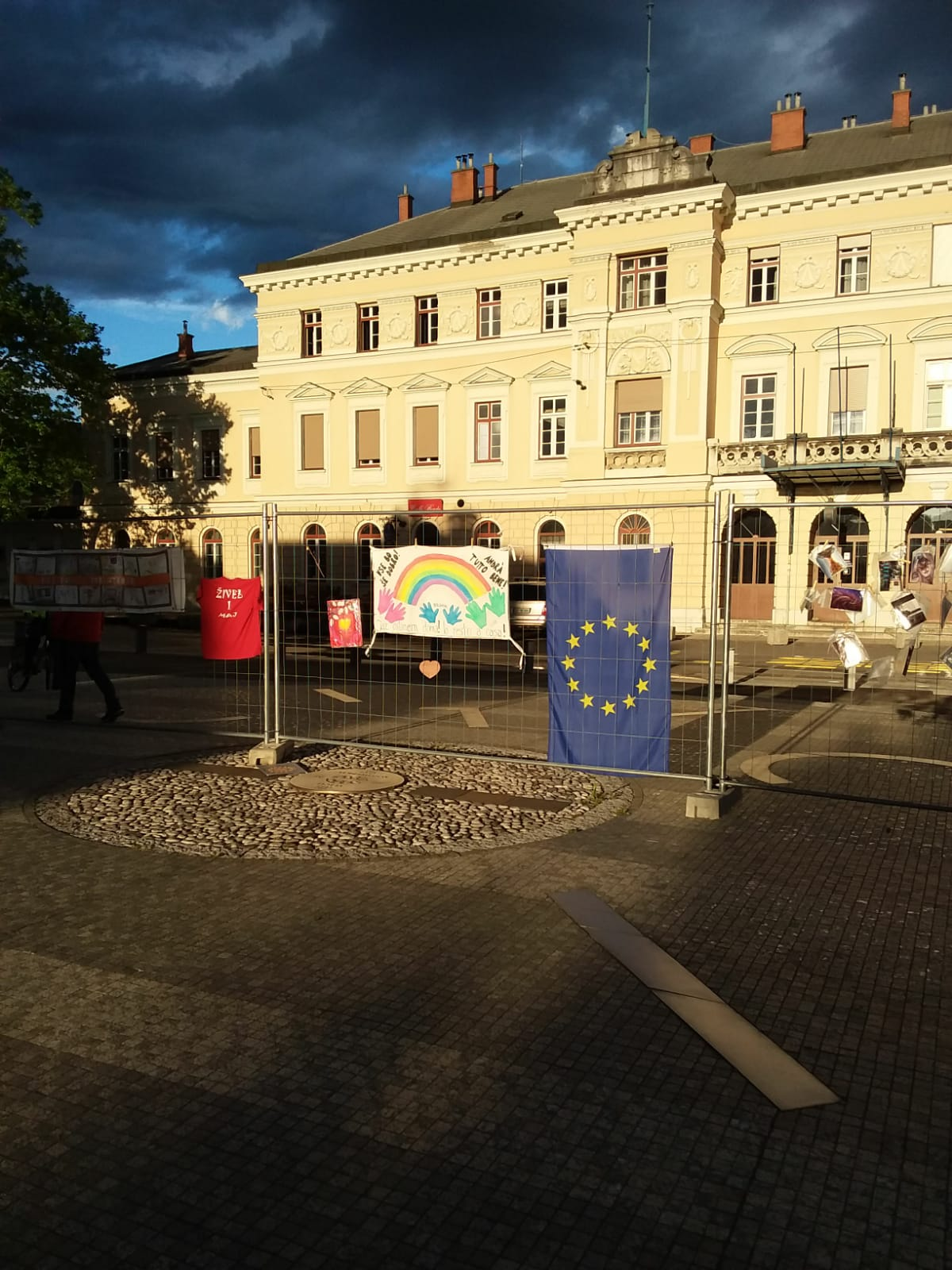
In May 2020, during the coronavirus pandemic, Transalpina Square was shut down and a wire net arose to divide the square and to not let people cross the border. This reminded many citizens of Gorizia and Nova Gorica of the times between 1947 and 2004 when the two towns were divided by a fence.

Transalpina Square (Italian: Piazza della Transalpina, meaning "Square of the Transalpina [Railway Line])"; Slovene: Trg Evrope, meaning "Europe Square"), is a square divided between the towns of Gorizia, northeastern Italy, and Nova Gorica, southwestern Slovenia. The railway station of Nova Gorica is located at the eastern end of the square, on the Slovenian side.

== History ==
=== Overview ===
From 1947 (Treaty of Paris) an international border between Italy and Yugoslavia (Slovenia since 1991) crosses the square. Until 2004 the square was divided by a border wall; movement on the square is now free because both Italy and Slovenia are EU members and part of the Schengen Area. Before 21 December 2007, free movement was only allowed within the square provided that a person that entered the square from one country returned to that country. An approved border crossing was located 100 m (330 feet; 110 yards) from the square. It is now no longer needed and has not been in use since 2007.

=== Naming ===
The square, in which is located Nova Gorica station, until 1947 Gorizia Montesanto, was named after the Transalpine Railway, Jesenice-Trieste. The naming of the square is somewhat controversial because Slovenia suggested "Europe Square", but Italy has preferred to use the old historical name Piazza della Transalpina.

== Location ==
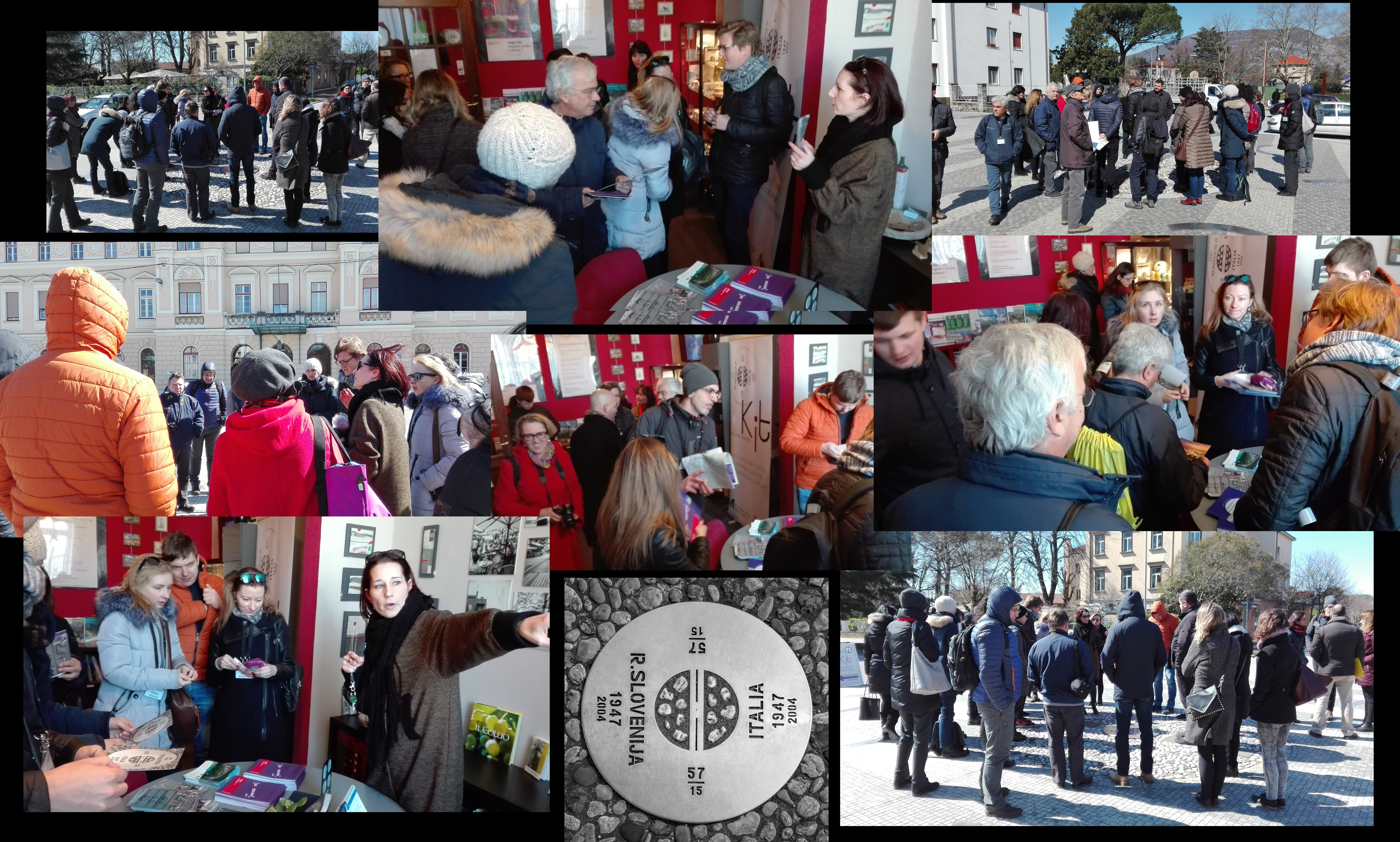
Tourist information office in Transalpina square (Europe square).

On the Slovenian side the square is crossed, parallel to the station building, by a road named "Kolodvorska pot". The partly parallel Italian road is "Via Ugo Foscolo", that continues as "Via Caterina Percoto". Always on the Italian side, "Via Giuseppe Caprin", that starts in "Via Montesanto" ends in front of the station.

== Events ==
In summers, the square is regularly used for concerts, public meetings, and public demonstrations or protests against local politics or current events.

== Gallery ==
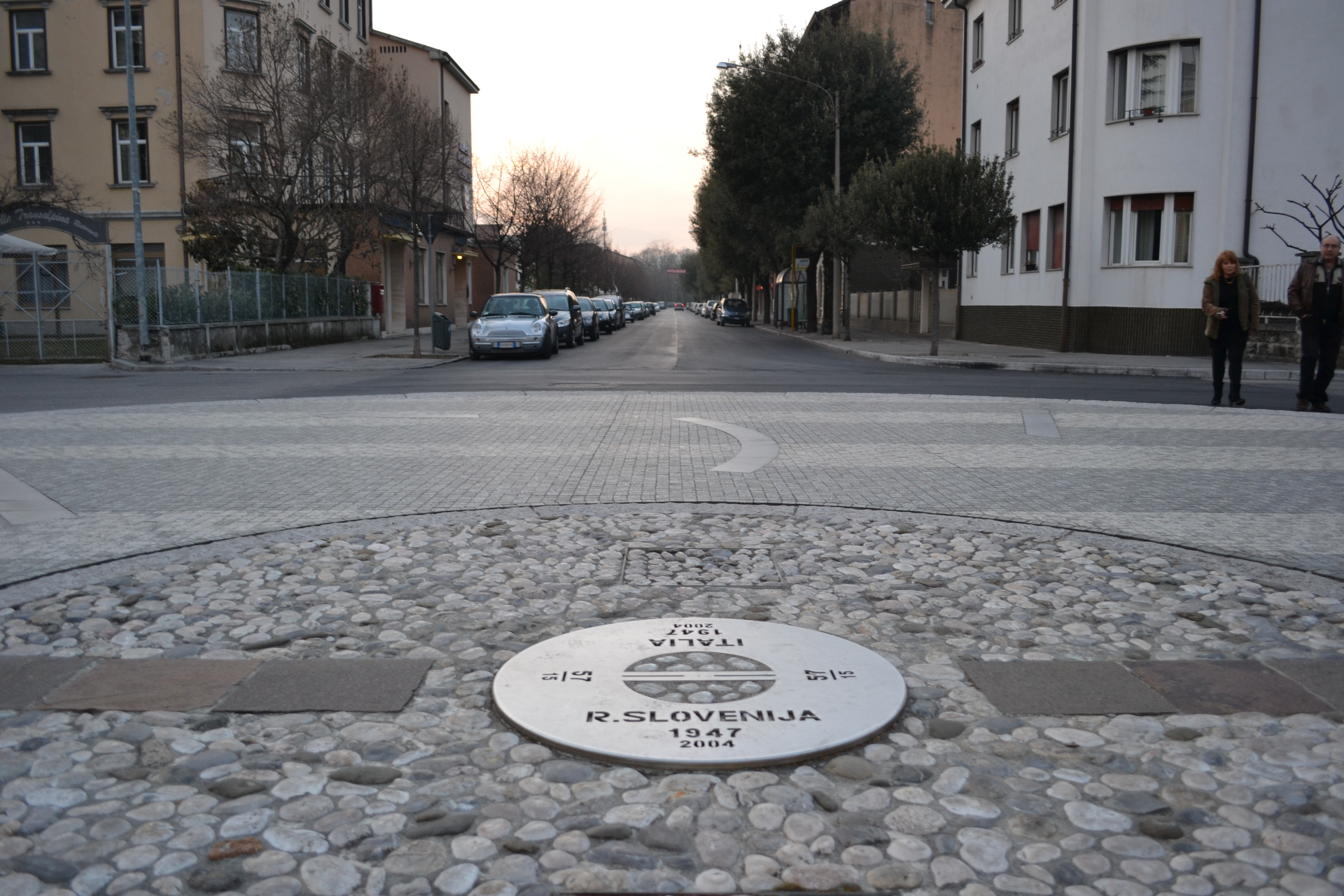
Metal plaque installed in 2004 in the middle of the square at the border point, once crossed by the "Gorizia Wall" [the latter separated Slovenian Yugoslavia from Italy, and during this era border controls were carried out the same way as along Berlin wall, moreover this was strengthened with barbed wire to prevent escapes ]

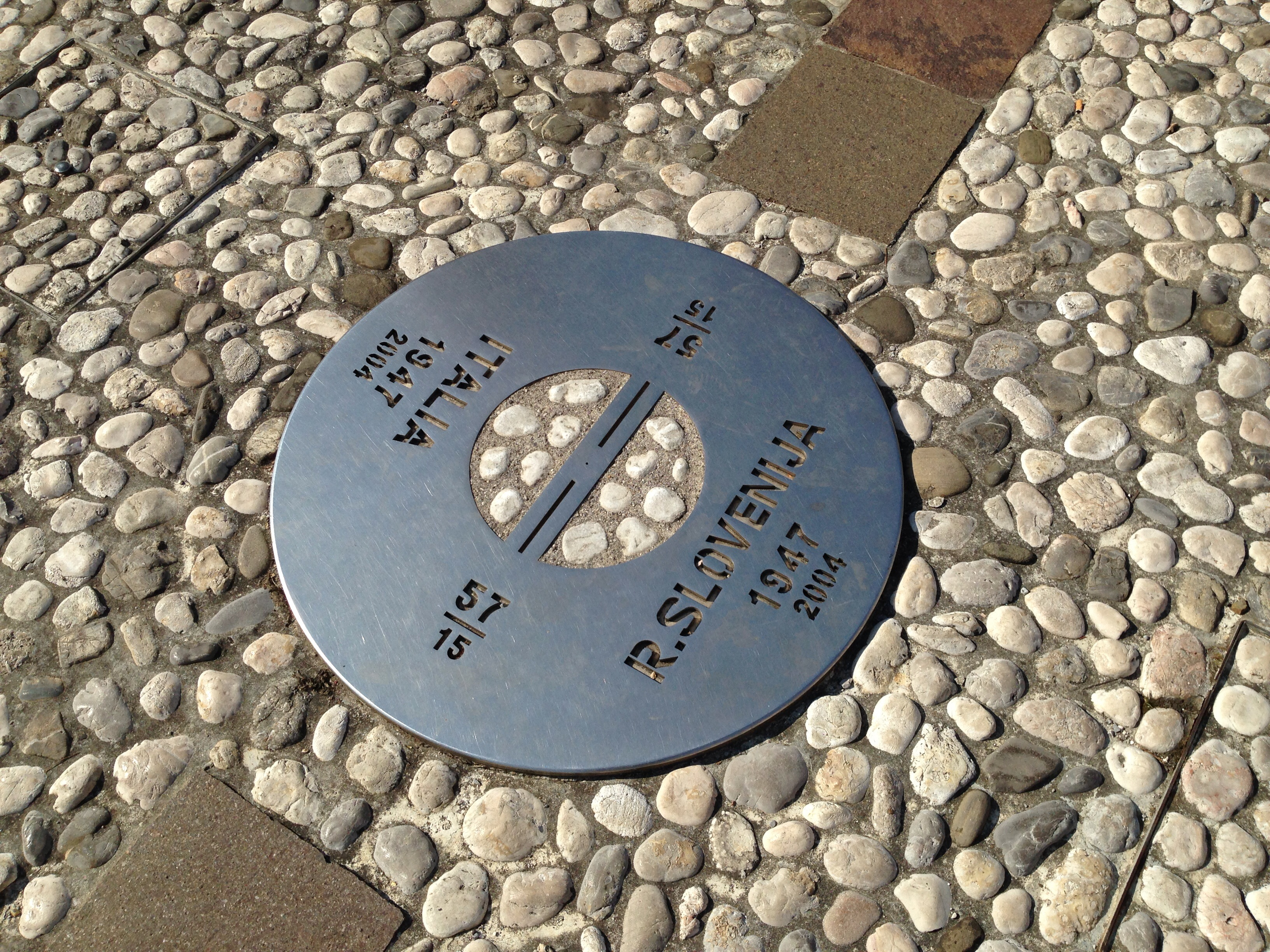
Detail of the metal plaque

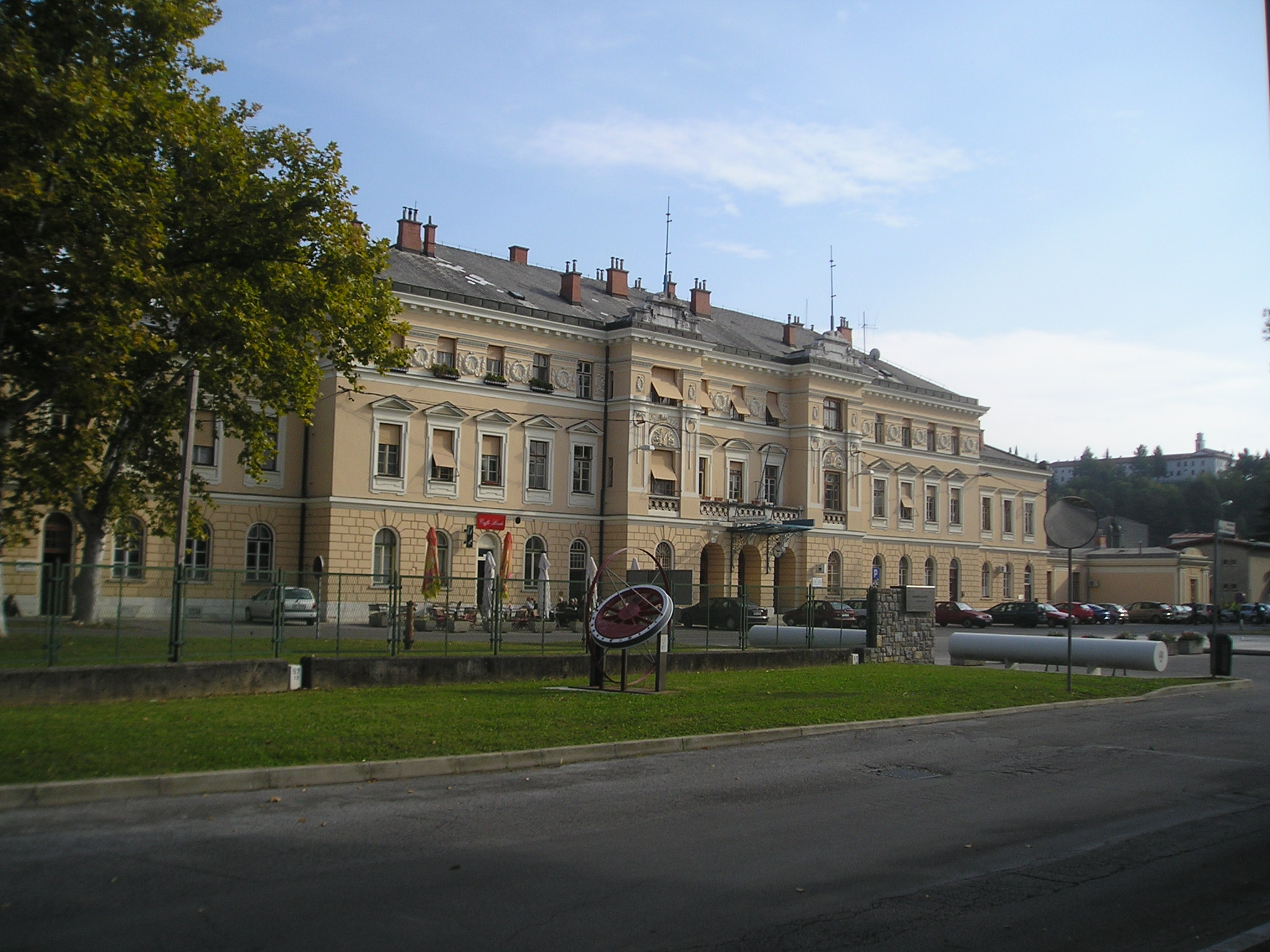
The western corner of the square (and station) from "Via Ugo Foscolo" (Gorizia). The remaining parts of the wall are shown.

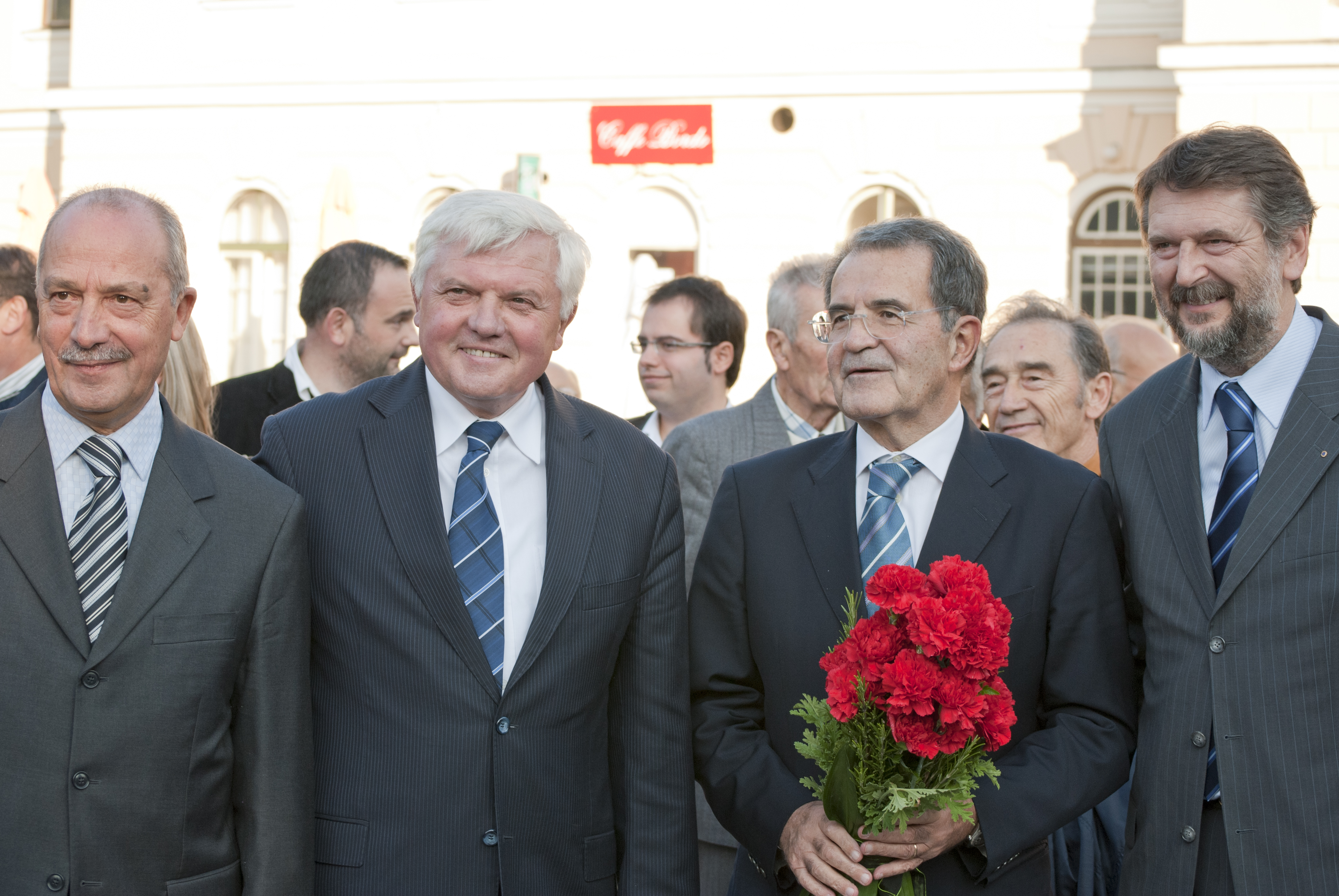
From left: Vittorio Brancati (mayor of Gorizia), Mirko Brulc (Mayor of Nova Gorica), Romano Prodi (member of the European Commission) and Dragan Valenčič (mayor of Šempeter-Vrtojba); during the ceremony of the fall of the border (2004)
