= Podbrdo, Tolmin =

Podbrdo
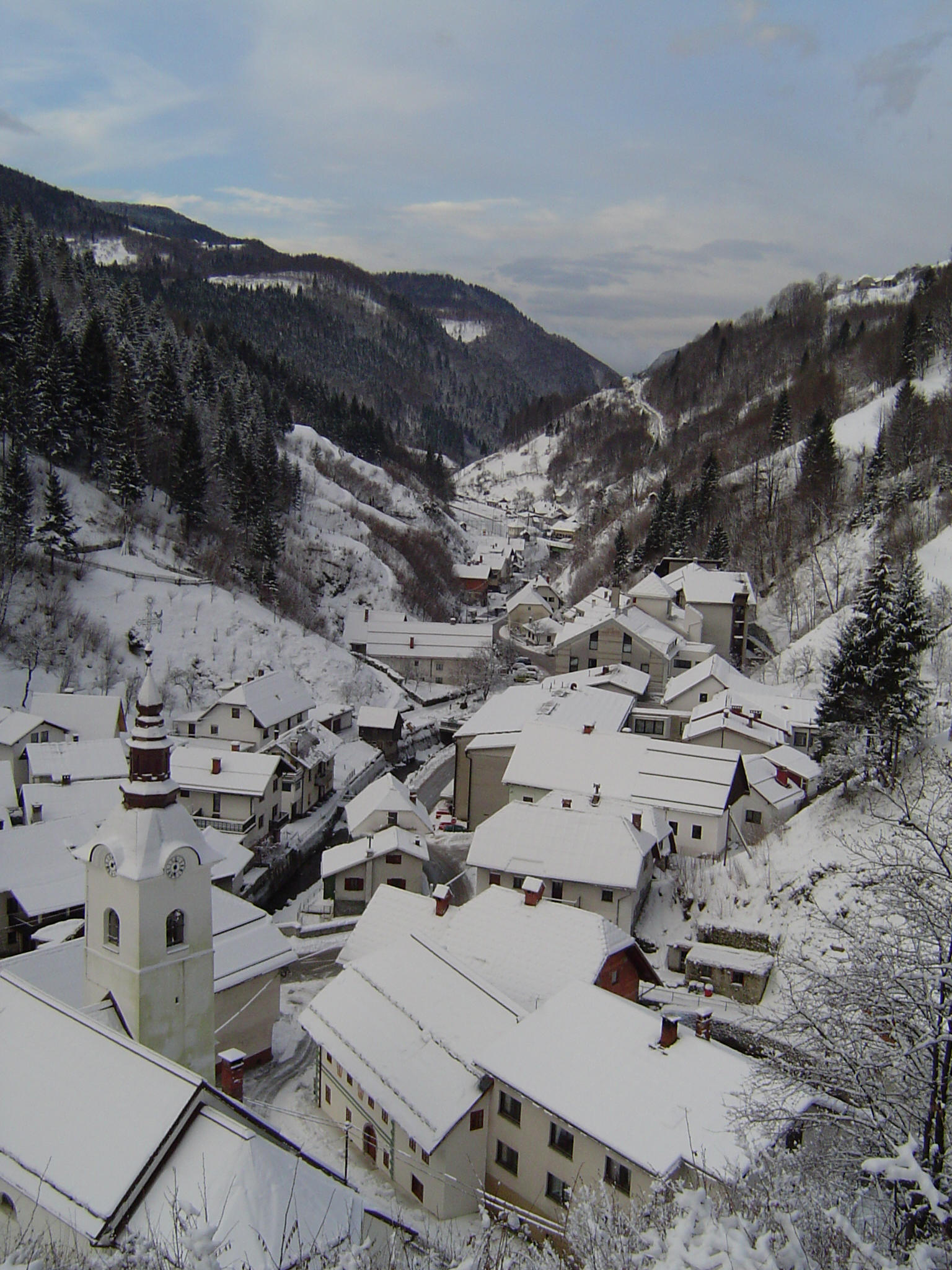

- Location in Slovenia
- Coordinates: 46°12′35.97″N 13°58′22.08″E
- Country: Slovenia
- Traditional region: Slovenian Littoral
- Statistical region: Gorizia
- Municipality: Tolmin

Area
  - Total: 5.44 km^{2} (2.10 sq mi)
- Elevation: 535.3 m (1,756 ft)

Population (2002)
  - Total: 725

Podbrdo (pronounced [pɔdˈbəɾdɔ]; Italian: Piedicolle, German: Untereck) is a settlement in the Municipality of Tolmin in the Littoral region of Slovenia. It lies in narrow valley of the Bača River, next to the Bohinj Railway line at the end of the longest railway tunnel in Slovenia (6,327.3 m) and next to the road from Bohinjska Bistrica and Železniki across Petrovo Brdo towards Most na Soči.

== Name ==
The name Podbrdo is a fused prepositional phrase that has lost its case inflection, from pod 'under' + brdo 'hill', thus referring to the local geography.

== History ==
The settlement was founded in the 16th century by German-speaking settlers from Tyrol, but the area was settled earlier.

== Church ==
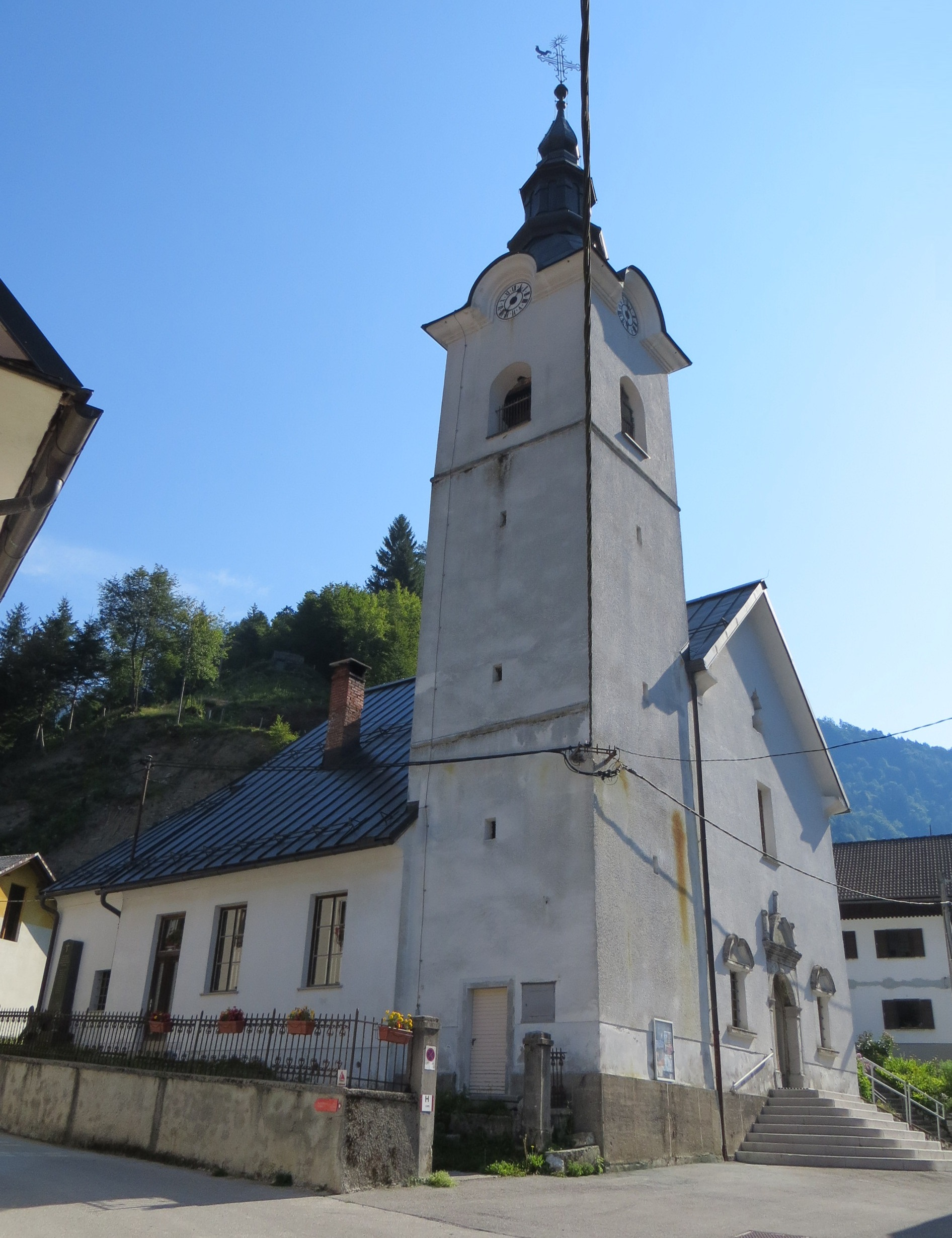
Exterior

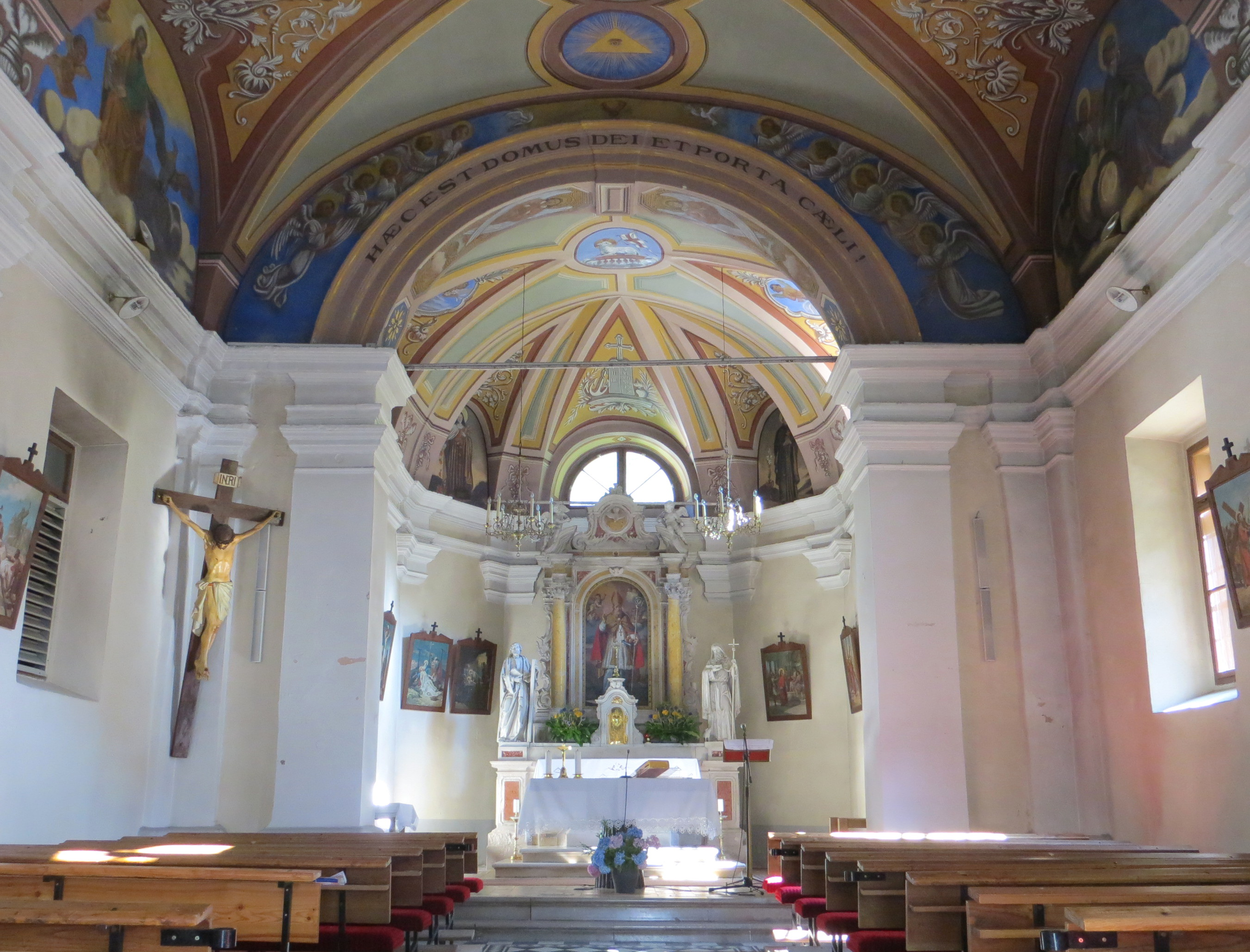
Chancel

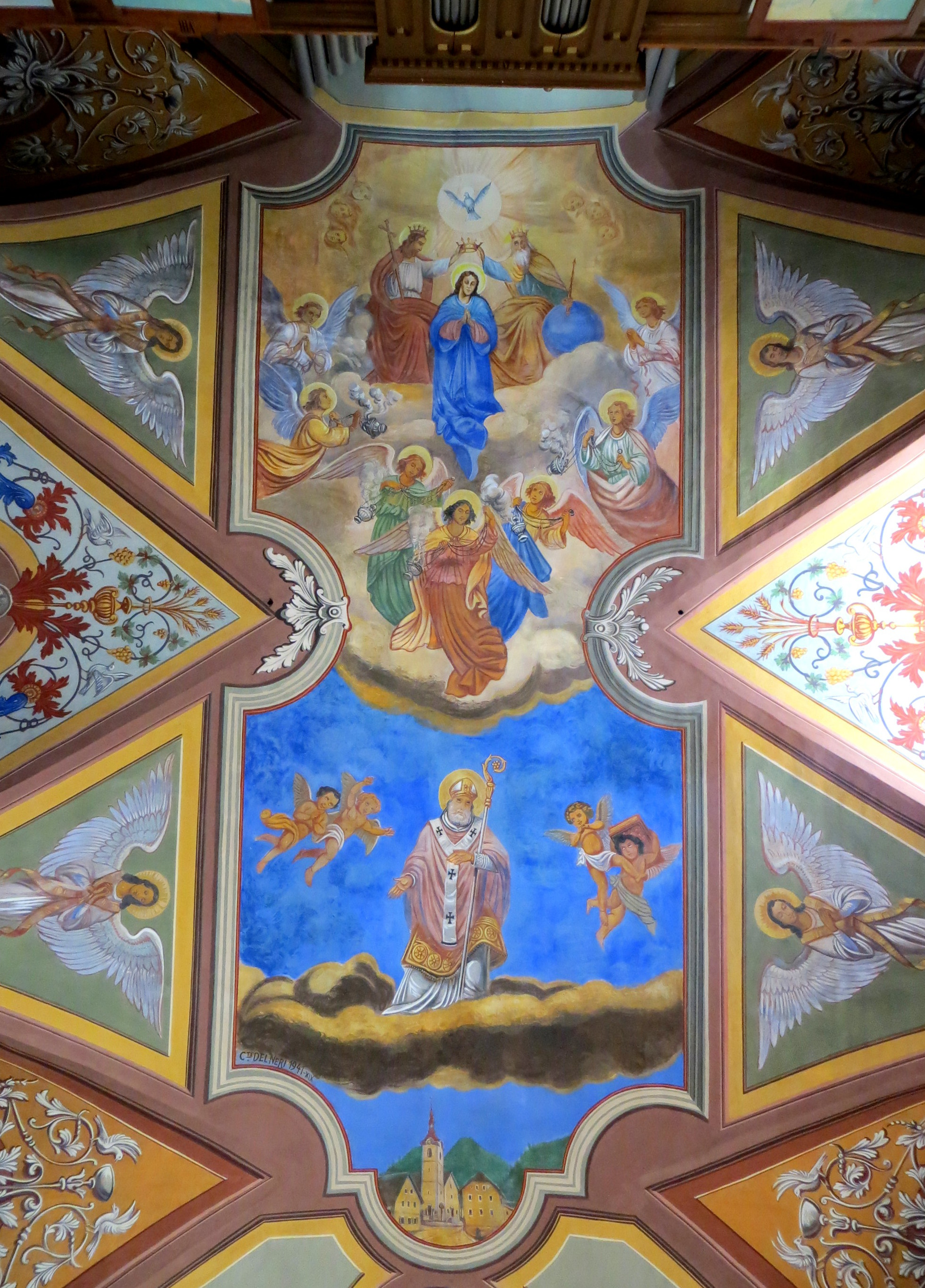
Ceiling

Saint Nicholas's Church

The most important building in the village is the parish church; it is dedicated to Saint Nicholas and belongs to the Diocese of Koper. It dates from the Baroque period.

== Other cultural heritage ==
Podbrdo railway station, on the Bohinj Railway, was a border crossing point between the Kingdom of Italy and the Kingdom of Yugoslavia between World War I and World War II.

There are also many 19th-century houses, a monument to the workers that died during construction of the railway tunnel, and memorials to the uprising against fascism (between World War I and World War II, when Podbrdo, then named Piedicolle, was part of Italy).

== Natural heritage ==
Podbrdo is surrounded by many attractive mountains such as Slatnik (1589 m), Lajnar (1549 m), Bača Peak (Vrh Bače, 1281 m), Črna Prst (1844 m), Kobla (1498 m), and Porezen (1622 m).
The sunny side of Črna Prst has attracted botanists for more than 200 years. In the mountain meadows it is possible to find a number of rare species:

- Short-haired sandwort (Moehringia villosa), an endemic flower of Bača
- Silvery crane's bill (Geranium argenteum)
- Alpine sea holly (Eryngium alpinum)
- Tephroseris pseudocrispa
- Campanula zoysii
- Artemisia nitida
