= Bohinj Railway =

Slovenian-Italian cross-border railway

Jesenice–Nova Gorica–Trieste Campo Marzio Bohinj Railway
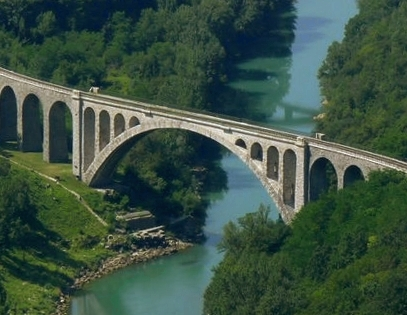
- Solkan Bridge, the second-longest stone bridge in the world

Overview
- Line number: 70 (Austria); 67 (Italy)

Technical
- Line length: 129 km (80 mi)
- Track gauge: 1435mm
- Electrification: Villa Opicina–Trieste: 3 kV DC
- Operating speed: 80 km/h (50 mph) max.
- Maximum incline: 2,5%

The Bohinj Railway (Slovene: Bohinjska proga, Italian: Transalpina, German: Wocheiner Bahn) is a railway in Slovenia and Italy. It connects Jesenice in Slovenia with Trieste in Italy. It was built by Austria-Hungary from 1900 to 1906 as a part of a new strategic railway, the Neue Alpenbahnen, that would connect Western Austria and Southern Germany with the then Austro-Hungarian port of Trieste. The line starts in Jesenice, at the southern end of the Karawanks Tunnel; it then crosses the Julian Alps through the Bohinj Tunnel, and passes the border town of Nova Gorica before crossing the Italian border and reaching Trieste.

During the First World War, it carried the majority of Austrian military supplies to the Isonzo Front. Because of new political divisions in Europe, with the dissolution of Austria-Hungary into separate states in 1918 and the isolation of communist Yugoslavia after 1945, the railway decreased in importance during the twentieth century. However, Slovenia's accession to the European Union has created new prospects for the railway as a convenient passenger and freight route from Central and Eastern Europe to the port of Trieste.

Distinctive features of the railway are the 6,327.3-metre (20,759 ft) Bohinj Tunnel under 1,498-metre (4,915 ft) Mount Kobla and the Solkan Bridge with its 85-metre (279 ft) arch over the Soča River (the longest stone railway arch in the world).

== Names ==
- The Slovenian name for the railway is Bohinjska proga (Bohinj railway), referring to both the valley and the town of Bohinj.
- The German name for it is Wocheiner Bahn (the German name of Bohinj); the southern part of the railway, beyond Nova Gorica, has also been known as the Karstbahn. At the time of construction, the official designation was Karawanken- und Wocheinerbahn, in reference to the Karawanks railway from which it originates in Jesenice: together with the Tauern Railway (Tauernbahn), it formed the New Alpine Railways project (Neue Alpenbahnen).
- In Italian, the railway is known as the Ferrovia Transalpina (the Cross-Alps Railway), and that name is still used for Italian services between Gorizia and Trieste.

== History ==
=== The political decision ===
In 1869, the Trieste Chamber of Commerce had sent a petition to the Emperor Franz Joseph, in which they argued that the opening that year of the Suez Canal would indubitably lead to further development of Trieste, the main port of the Austro-Hungarian Empire; therefore, a second railway line to Vienna or the northern parts of Austria would be needed to support increased maritime traffic, in addition to the existing Austrian Southern Railway. The discussion regarding the path that new railway would take was not easily settled, and led to a "nearly thirty year long war".

Only by 1901 was this dispute settled. On 12 February of that year, the Minister for Railway Affairs of Austria Heinrich Ritter von Wittek brought a bill to the attention of the Imperial Council (the Austrian parliament) for the construction of and public investment in new railways. After approval by both chambers, the Emperor signed the bill into law on 6 June 1901. Among other provisions, the law provided that the Karawanks and Wocheiner (now Bohinj) railways should be built by 1905 as main lines of the first rank. The cost of that railway was estimated at 103.6 million Kronen, by far the most expensive railway project in the law. That cost would be covered by the issue of government bonds.

To overhaul such a large project, the Minister named a Construction Director directly subordinate to him, the engineer Karl Wurmb. In 1905, both Minister Wittek and Wurmb were subjected to criticism in parliament regarding cost overruns incurred by the construction because of geological difficulties.

On the Austrian Littoral side of the route, the builders first faced more demanding work in Podbrdo. Giacomo Ceconi’s company started the exploratory shaft along the axis of the planned Bohinj Tunnel as early as 1900. The works on the rest of the route for the Bohinj Railway was subcontracted in spring 1903. The section between Podbrdo and Šempeter was divided into nine parts: construction of the first five sections from Podbrdo to Ajba was taken over by the Viennese company Brüder Redlich und Berger, and the remaining four sections to Šempeter were taken over by the Italian company Sard, Lenassi & Co incorporated in Gorizia for this project by the Italian engineer Giovanni Battista Sard of Turin. Construction of the section between Podbrdo and Grahovo was the most demanding: eight bridges, thirty-three culverts, and six tunnels had to be built because of avalanche slopes and watery terrain. The most important and still most admired structures along the entire Bohinj Railway are the Bohinj Tunnel, the Idrijca Viaduct at Bača pri Modreju, and the Solkan Bridge.

=== Operation until 1945 ===
After the First World War, the railway was separated to Yugoslavia and Italy as a result of the Treaty of Versailles. The border had been located in the middle of the Bohinj tunnel; Italy obtained the whole area of the Isonzo valley. In Italy, the new Solkan bridge was reconstructed in its original form. The segment Villa Opicina–Trieste was until 1936 electrified with the 3000 V direct current.

=== Operation since 1945 ===
In 1945, the border between Italy and Yugoslavia moved in the western direction; most parts of the Isonzo valley then belonged to Yugoslavia. Until 1948, the Kreplje–Sežana branch line was constructed; near Sežana it connects to the historical Austrian Southern Railway. This connection enables traffic between the Southern Railway and this line to avoid Italian territory altogether. At this time, the passenger service south of Kreplje ceased, terminating at Sežana instead of continuing into Italy. The original southern terminus, Trieste Campo Marzio, thereafter served only local passenger traffic, and entirely closed to passengers in 1960. Because of political isolation in Europe, the Bohinj Railway lost its importance from 1945 to 1990.

After the opening of the Koper Railway in 1967, services ran from Koper via the Karst Railway and this line into Germany or Austria. After the earthquake in Friuli in 1976, it was used as a detour for express trains. Since the beginning of the 1990s, rail transport has been mostly via Pivka and Ljubljana, which caused the Soča corridor to decline significantly.

The accession of Slovenia and other states to the European Union in 2004 and to the Schengen area at the end of 2007 significantly increased rail traffic from large parts of Europe to the ports of Trieste and Koper, which are conveniently located especially for the Czech Republic, southern Germany, Slovakia, Austria, and Hungary, by abolishing border controls. Nevertheless, international passenger services on the Bohinj Railway did not resume.

== See also ==
- Transalpina/Europe Square

== Literature ==
- "Die Eisenbahnneubauten in Oesterreich. Wocheiner-Bahn" (PDF). Zentralblatt der Bauverwaltung. Nachrichten der Reichs- und Staatsbehörden. XXIII (56). Berlin: Herausgegeben im Ministerium der Öffentlichen Arbeiten: 357ff. 1903. ZDB-ID 200914-6
- Die Wocheiner Bahn (Hiezu 12 Bilder). In: Österreichs Illustrierte Zeitung, Year 1905, Nr. 44/1905, p. 998 f. (Online bei ANNO).
- Hofmann, Albert (1906). "Die Eröffnung der Wocheiner Linie der neuen Alpenbahn Salzburg-Triest" (PDF). Deutsche Bauzeitung. XL (62). Berlin: Verlag der Deutschen Bauzeitung: 422ff. ZDB-ID 211963-8
- Benesch, Fritz (1910). "Verkehrsbuch österreichischer Eisenbahnen". Krain und Küstenland. Wien: Reisser.
- Der Bau des Wocheiner Tunnels. In: Allgemeine Bauzeitung, Year 1911, LXXVI. Jahrgang, p. 25–41 sowie Pläne 16–21. (Online bei ANNO).
- Siebente Auflage (1912). "Illustrierter Führer auf den k.k. Österreichischen Staatsbahnen". Für die Strecken Schwarzach-St. Veit–Badgastein–Villach, Villach–Rosenbach–Assling–Görz–Triest (36). Wien: Steyrermühl.
- Heinersdorff, Richard (1975). Die k.u.k. privilegierten Eisenbahnen der österreichisch-ungarischen Monarchie. Vol. 1. Wien: Verlag Fritz Molden. ISBN 3-217-00571-6.
- Pilgram, Gerhard; Berger, Wilhelm (2006). Das Weite suchen. Zu Fuß von Kärnten nach Triest. Ein Wander-Reise-Lesebuch. Gerhard Maurer illustrator. Klagenfurt: Carinthia-Verlag. ISBN 978-3-85378-594-2.
- Oberegger, Elmar (2007). "Die wichtigsten Hauptbahnen". Alpen-Donau-Adria-Raumes. Sattledt: Eigenverlag Info-Büro für Österreichische Eisenbahngeschichte. ZDB-ID 2387534-3
- Rustja, Karol (1990). Proga predorov (in Slovenian) (2nd ed.). Ljubljana: Železniško gospodarstvo, Odsek za muzejsko dejavnost. COBISS 13198338
