= Gorski Vrh =

Gorski Vrh Vrh (until 1955)
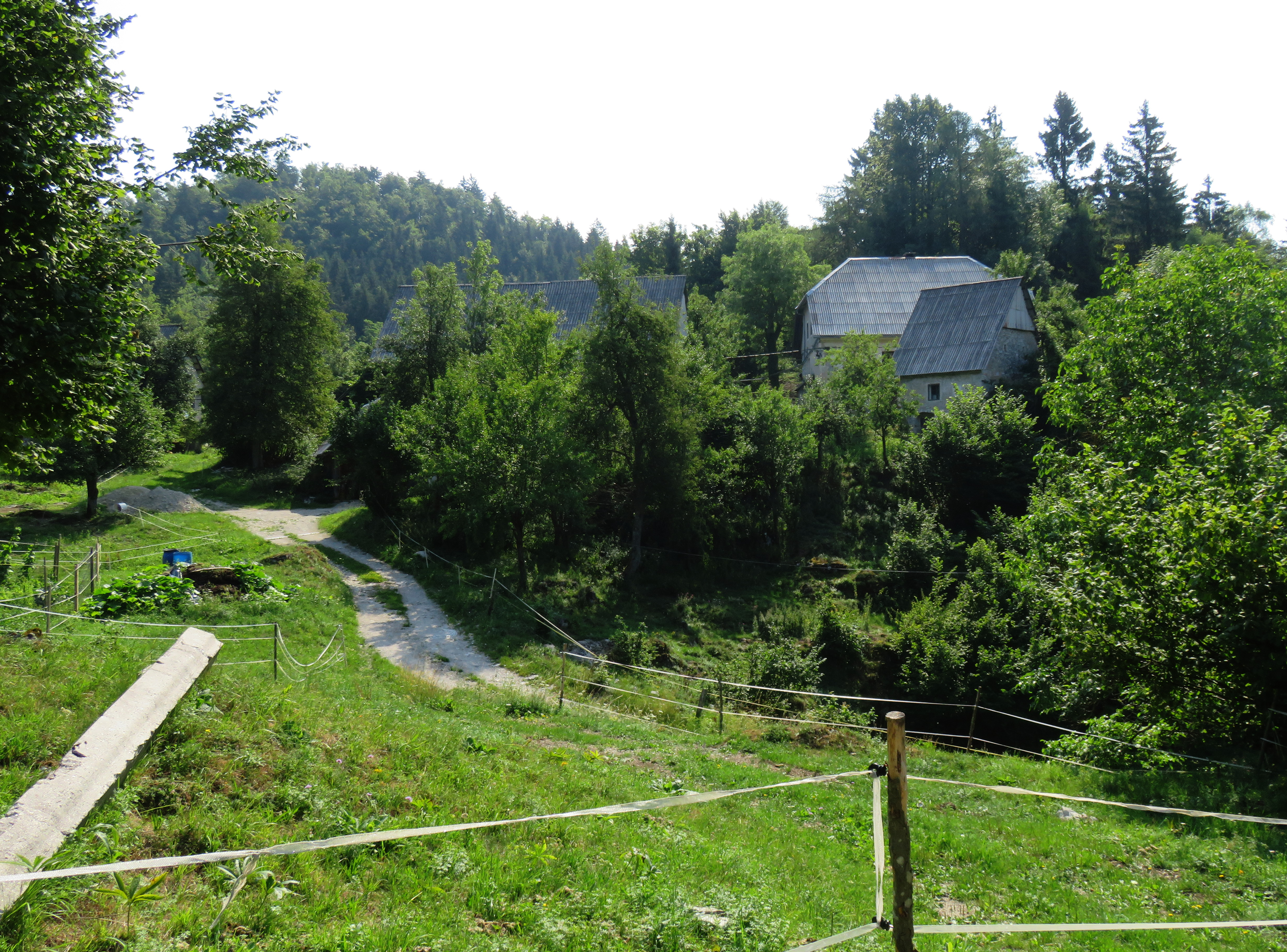

- Location in Slovenia
- Coordinates: 46°8′4.48″N 13°52′32.56″E
- Country: Slovenia
- Traditional region: Slovenian Littoral
- Statistical region: Gorizia
- Municipality: Tolmin

Area
  - Total: 3.85 km^{2} (1.49 sq mi)
- Elevation: 862.5 m (2,830 ft)

Population (2002)
  - Total: 12

Gorski Vrh (pronounced [ˈɡɔːɾski ˈʋəɾx], locally Vrh) is a small dispersed settlement in the hills north of the Idrijca River in the Municipality of Tolmin in the Littoral region of Slovenia. It is accessible from the village of Slap ob Idrijci via Šentviška Gora.

== Geography ==
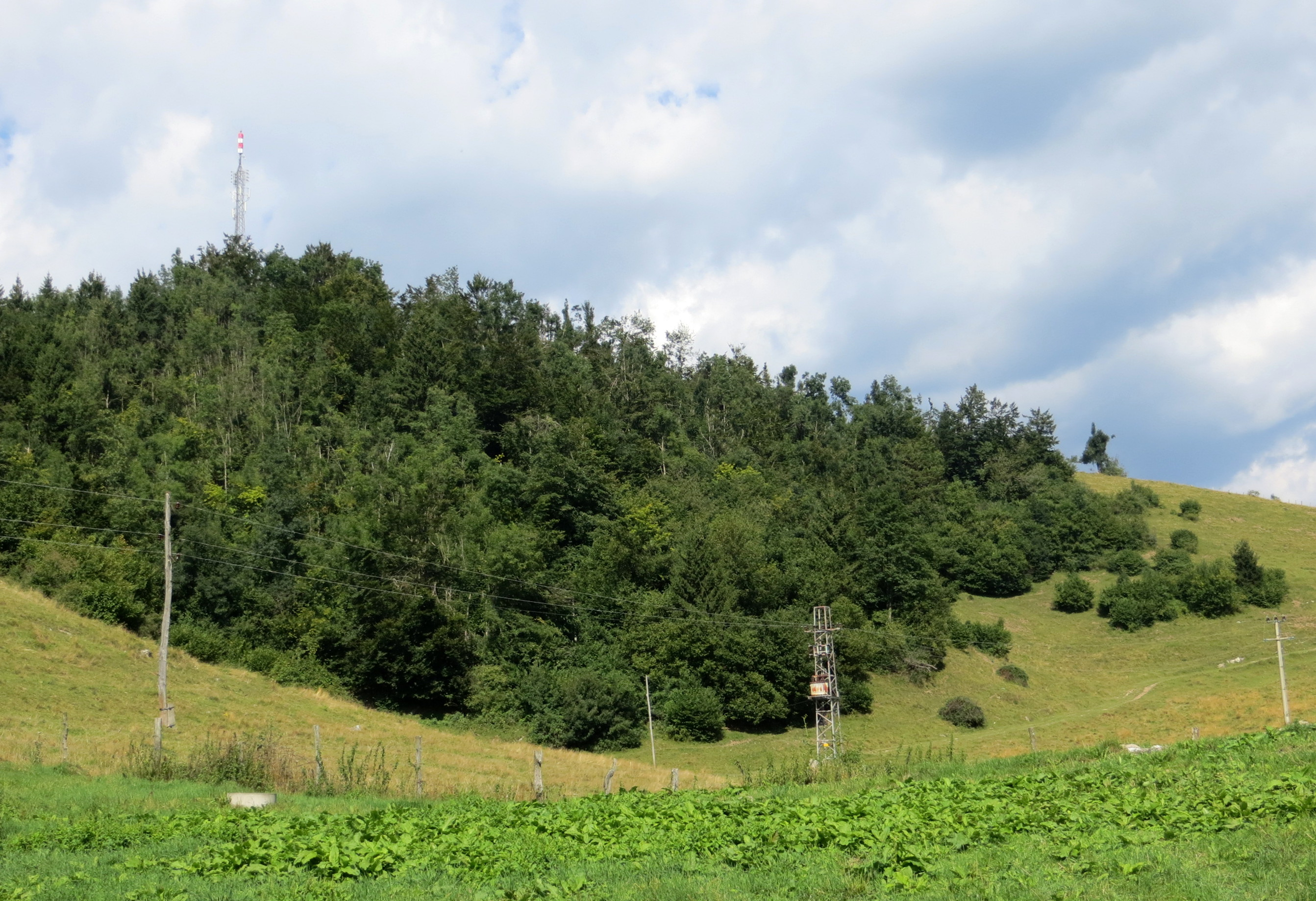
Črv Peak with radio tower

Gorski Vrh is a scattered village on the slope south of the highest point on the Šentviška Gora Plateau, Črv Peak (Slovene: Črvov vrh, 974 meters or 3,196 feet), also known as Črv Hill (Slovene: Črvov grič). Košarica Hill (961 meters or 3,153 feet) rises in the eastern part of the village. Gorski Vrh includes the hamlets and isolated farms of Jerovica, Podkremenk, Štrin, Travnikar, and V Griču (Slovene: V griču). The land has a karst character and generally lacks running surface water. There are karst caves in the vicinity, including Skrinjce Cave, where a short intermittent stream runs into the ground. The few springs in the area (at Travnikar, Oplence, Poloji, Skrinje, and Podkorito) produce water only after heavy rainfall. The hill slopes in the village are mostly covered in mixed woods. There are very few pastures in the village, but low-quality hay fields are also used for pasturing.

== Name ==
The name of the settlement was changed from Vrh to Gorski Vrh in 1955. Locally, the settlement continues to be known as Vrh.
