= Zadlaz–Žabče =

- Location in Slovenia
- Coordinates: 46°12′17.35″N 13°45′34.54″E
- Country: Slovenia
- Traditional region: Slovenian Littoral
- Statistical region: Gorizia
- Municipality: Tolmin

Area
  - Total: 5.09 km^{2} (1.97 sq mi)
- Elevation: 450.7 m (1,479 ft)

Population (2002)
  - Total: 27

Zadlaz–Žabče (pronounced [zadˈlas ˈʒaːptʃɛ]; Slovene: Zadlaz - Žabče) is a settlement in the hills northeast of Tolmin in the Littoral region of Slovenia. It is accessible by road through the village of Žabče.
