= Sela nad Podmelcem =

- Location in Slovenia
- Coordinates: 46°10′40.7″N 13°48′56.28″E
- Country: Slovenia
- Traditional region: Slovenian Littoral
- Statistical region: Gorizia
- Municipality: Tolmin

Area
  - Total: 6.47 km^{2} (2.50 sq mi)
- Elevation: 829.8 m (2,722 ft)

Population (2002)
  - Total: 9

Sela nad Podmelcem (pronounced [ˈseːla nat pɔdˈmeːu̯tsɛm]) is a small village in the hills north of Podmelec in the Municipality of Tolmin in the Littoral region of Slovenia.
