= Loje =

- Location in Slovenia
- Coordinates: 46°10′56.96″N 13°50′6.35″E
- Country: Slovenia
- Traditional region: Slovenian Littoral
- Statistical region: Gorizia
- Municipality: Tolmin

Area
  - Total: 2.53 km^{2} (0.98 sq mi)
- Elevation: 460.3 m (1,510 ft)

Population (2002)
  - Total: 7

Loje (pronounced [ˈloːjɛ]) is small settlement in the hills north of Kneža in the Municipality of Tolmin in the Littoral region of Slovenia.

== Name ==
Loje was attested in historical sources as the singular Loch in 1566, and then as the plural Lose around 1600, Vlosech in 1624, and Losech in 1648. Like the name Voje (with shvapanye, or pronunciation of /l/ as [w] before back vowels), the name is derived from *Logje, an accusative plural of the common noun log 'low-lying marshy or wooded meadowland', thus referring to the geographical character of the place.

== Church ==
The local church is dedicated to Saints Peter and Paul and belongs to the Parish of Podmelec.
