= Doline (disambiguation) =

Doline is a common name for a sinkhole.

Doline may also refer to:

- Doline (Kanjiža), a village in the Kanjiža municipality, Serbia
- Doline, Kneževo, a settlement in Kneževo, Bosnia and Herzegovina
- Doline (Prnjavor), a settlement in Republika Srpska, Bosnia and Herzegovina
- Doline (Srbobran), a hamlet in Vojvodina, Serbia
- Doline, a hamlet in Bukovski Vrh in the Littoral region of Slovenia

== See also ==
- Dolina (disambiguation)
