= Ljubinj =

- Location in Slovenia
- Coordinates: 46°10′4.12″N 13°46′25.09″E
- Country: Slovenia
- Traditional region: Slovenian Littoral
- Statistical region: Gorizia
- Municipality: Tolmin

Area
  - Total: 10.39 km^{2} (4.01 sq mi)
- Elevation: 385.2 m (1,264 ft)

Population (2002)
  - Total: 138

Ljubinj (pronounced [ljuˈbiːn]; Italian: Lubino) is a settlement southeast of Tolmin in the Littoral region of Slovenia.

The local church is dedicated to Saint Michael and belongs to the Parish of Tolmin.
