= Kanalski Lom =

- Location in Slovenia
- Coordinates: 46°7′5.87″N 13°45′46.18″E
- Country: Slovenia
- Traditional region: Slovenian Littoral
- Statistical region: Gorizia
- Municipality: Tolmin

Area
  - Total: 5.56 km^{2} (2.15 sq mi)
- Elevation: 607.9 m (1,994 ft)

Population (2002)
  - Total: 96

Kanalski Lom (pronounced [kaˈnaːlski ˈloːm]) is a village in the hills south of Most na Soči in the Municipality of Tolmin in the Littoral region of Slovenia.

The parish church in the settlement is dedicated to Saints Primus and Felician and belongs to the Koper Diocese.
