= Temljine =

- Location in Slovenia
- Coordinates: 46°10′2.95″N 13°50′14.02″E
- Country: Slovenia
- Traditional region: Slovenian Littoral
- Statistical region: Gorizia
- Municipality: Tolmin

Area
  - Total: 6.53 km^{2} (2.52 sq mi)
- Elevation: 518.8 m (1,702 ft)

Population (2002)
  - Total: 45

Temljine (pronounced [tɛˈmljiːnɛ]) is a settlement in the Municipality of Tolmin in the Littoral region of Slovenia.
