= Kozaršče =

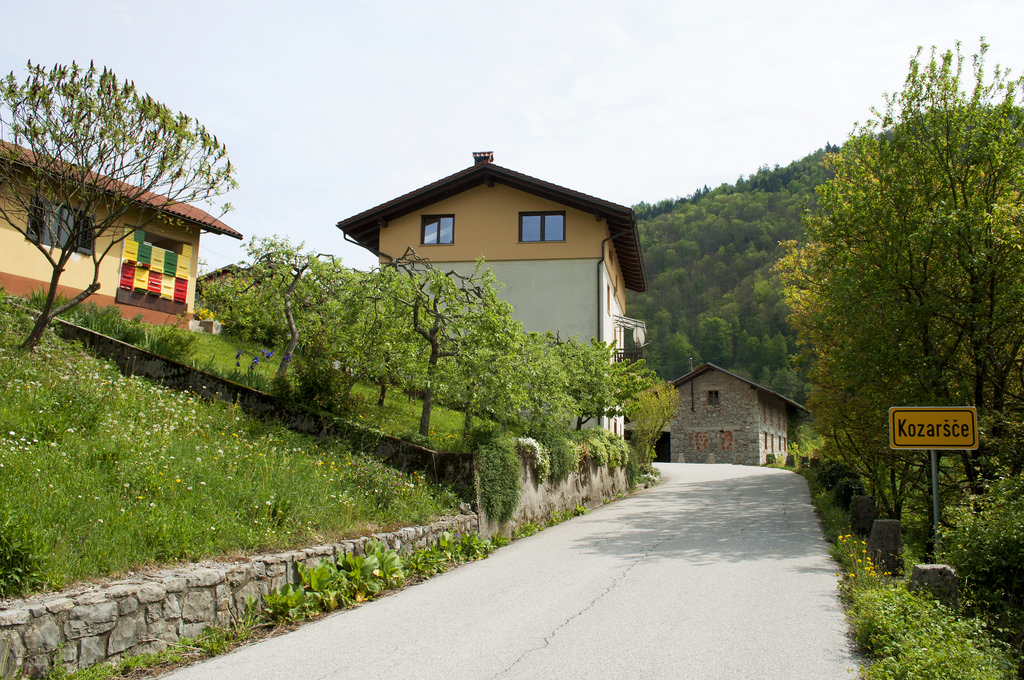

- Location in Slovenia
- Coordinates: 46°9′43.63″N 13°43′19.54″E
- Country: Slovenia
- Traditional region: Slovenian Littoral
- Statistical region: Gorizia
- Municipality: Tolmin

Area
  - Total: 1.8 km^{2} (0.69 sq mi)
- Elevation: 216.2 m (709 ft)

Population (2002)
  - Total: 98

Kozaršče (pronounced [kɔˈzaːɾʃtʃɛ]) is a small village northwest of Most na Soči in the Municipality of Tolmin in the Littoral region of Slovenia.

The local church, built on a hill to the north of the settlement, is dedicated to the Holy Name of Mary. It belongs to the Parish of Volče and dates back to the 12th century.
