= Kuk, Tolmin =

Kuk
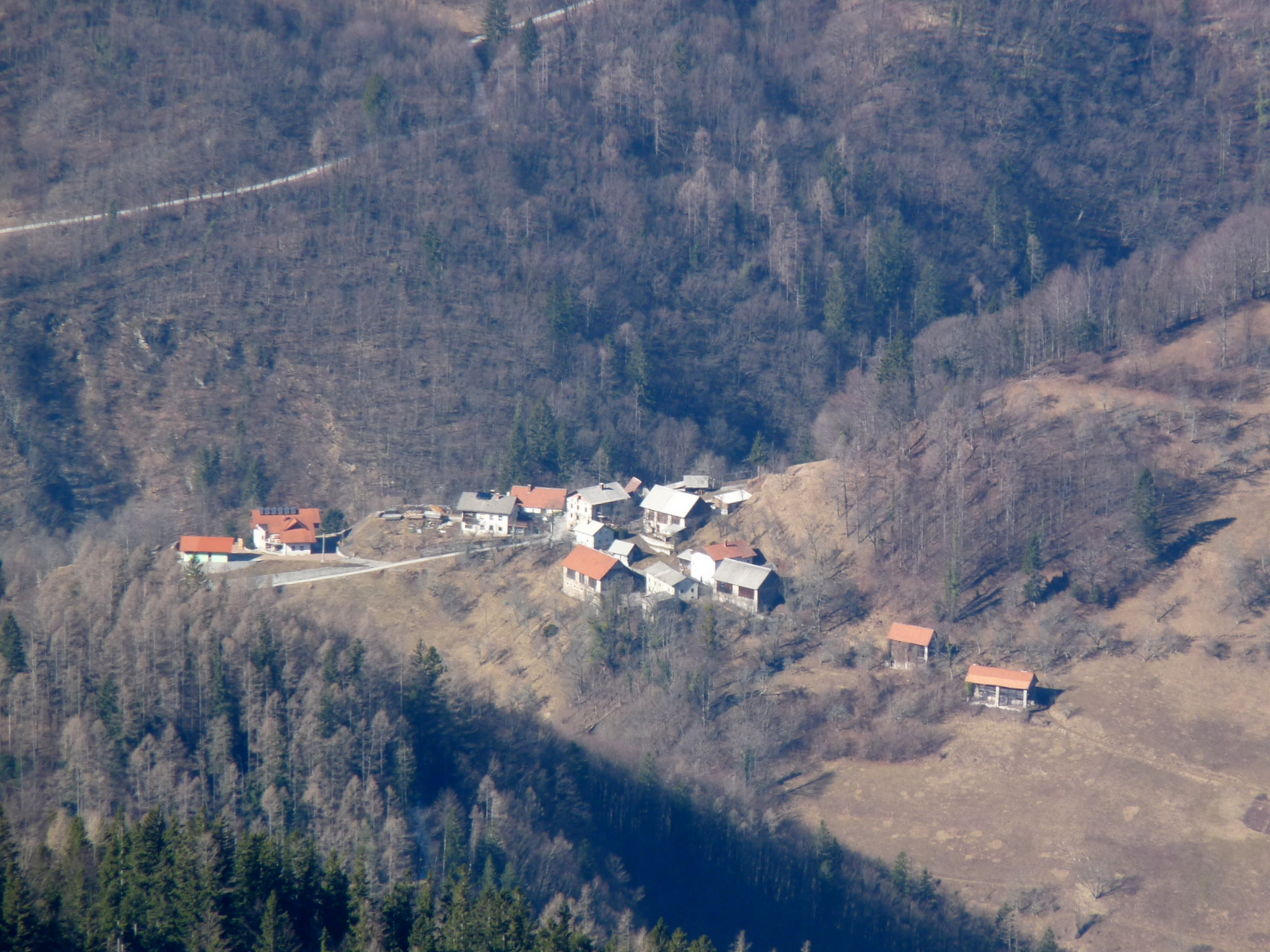

- Location in Slovenia
- Coordinates: 46°11′51.27″N 13°56′0.64″E
- Country: Slovenia
- Traditional region: Slovenian Littoral
- Statistical region: Gorizia
- Municipality: Tolmin

Area
  - Total: 3.85 km^{2} (1.49 sq mi)
- Elevation: 573.3 m (1,881 ft)

Population (2002)
  - Total: 30

Kuk (pronounced [ˈkuːk], German: Sonneck) is a small settlement above the right bank of the upper course of the Bača River in the Municipality of Tolmin in the Littoral region of Slovenia.
