= Municipality of Tolmin =

Municipality of Slovenia

Municipality of Tolmin Občina Tolmin
- Municipality
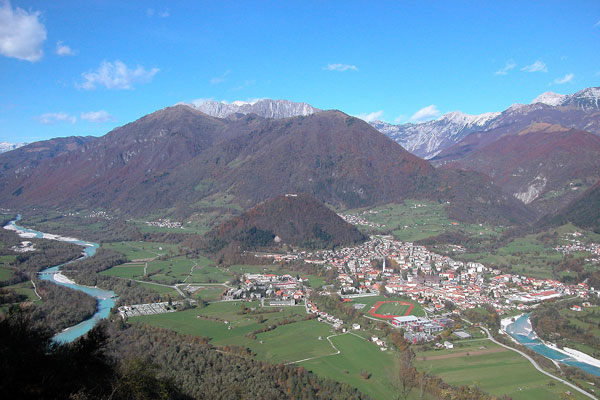
- Tolmin, the centre of the municipality

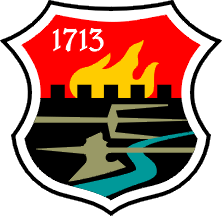
- Coat of arms

- Location of the Municipality of Tolmin in Slovenia
- Coordinates: 46°11′4″N 13°43′59″E
- Country: Slovenia

Government
  - Mayor: Alen Červ

Area
  - Total: 381.5 km^{2} (147.3 sq mi)

Population (2002)
  - Total: 12,198
  - Density: 31.97/km^{2} (82.81/sq mi)
- Time zone: UTC+01 (CET)
  - Summer (DST): UTC+02 (CEST)
- Website: www.tolmin.si

The Municipality of Tolmin (pronounced [tɔlˈmiːn]; Slovene: Občina Tolmin) is a municipality in northwestern Slovenia. Its seat and largest settlement is Tolmin. It borders Italy.

== History ==
In ancient times the area was inhabited by the Illyrians and then by the Romans. In the 6th century the Slavs, ancestors of present-day Slovenes, settled the area.

Until 1420 it belonged to the Patriarchate of Aquileia, when it was acquired by the Republic of Venice. In 1514 it became a possession of the Habsburgs, who gave it as fief to the Coronini-Cronberg family. Medieval documents testify to a long series of uprisings, culminating in the Tolmin peasant revolt of 1713. That particular insurgence spread from Tolmin County to the Vipava Valley, Karst, and Brda, and further on to northern Istria. The uprising was mercilessly crushed by the imperial army and its eleven leaders were beheaded.

In the 16th century, the area became part of the County of Gorizia and Gradisca. During the World War I, Tolmin served as a base for the victorious breach of the Soča/Isonzo Front. Occupied by Italian troops at the end of 1918, it was part of the Kingdom of Italy between 1918 and 1943 (nominally to 1947) as a commune of the Province of Gorizia (as Tolmino), except during the period between 1924 and 1927, when the Province of Gorizia was abolished and annexed to the Province of Udine. and between 1943 and 1945 of the Nazi German Operational Zone Adriatic Coast. In 1945 it was liberated by the Yugoslav Partisans and in 1947 it was officially annexed to Yugoslavia. Since then, it has been an integral part of Slovenia.

== Geography ==
The Tolmin area includes the Tolminka and Zadlaščica basins at the entrance to Triglav National Park, which are also its lowest point (180 meters or 590 feet). A special feature of the Tolminka Basins is a thermal spring at the end of the path. The region also boasts several record-holding waterfalls (Brinta Falls, 104 meters or 341 feet and Gregorčič Falls, 88 meters or 289 feet) and several other smaller waterfalls hidden in the ravines of Cold Creek (Slovene: Mrzli potok), Godiča Creek, Pščak Creek, and Sopotnica Creek.

=== Settlements ===
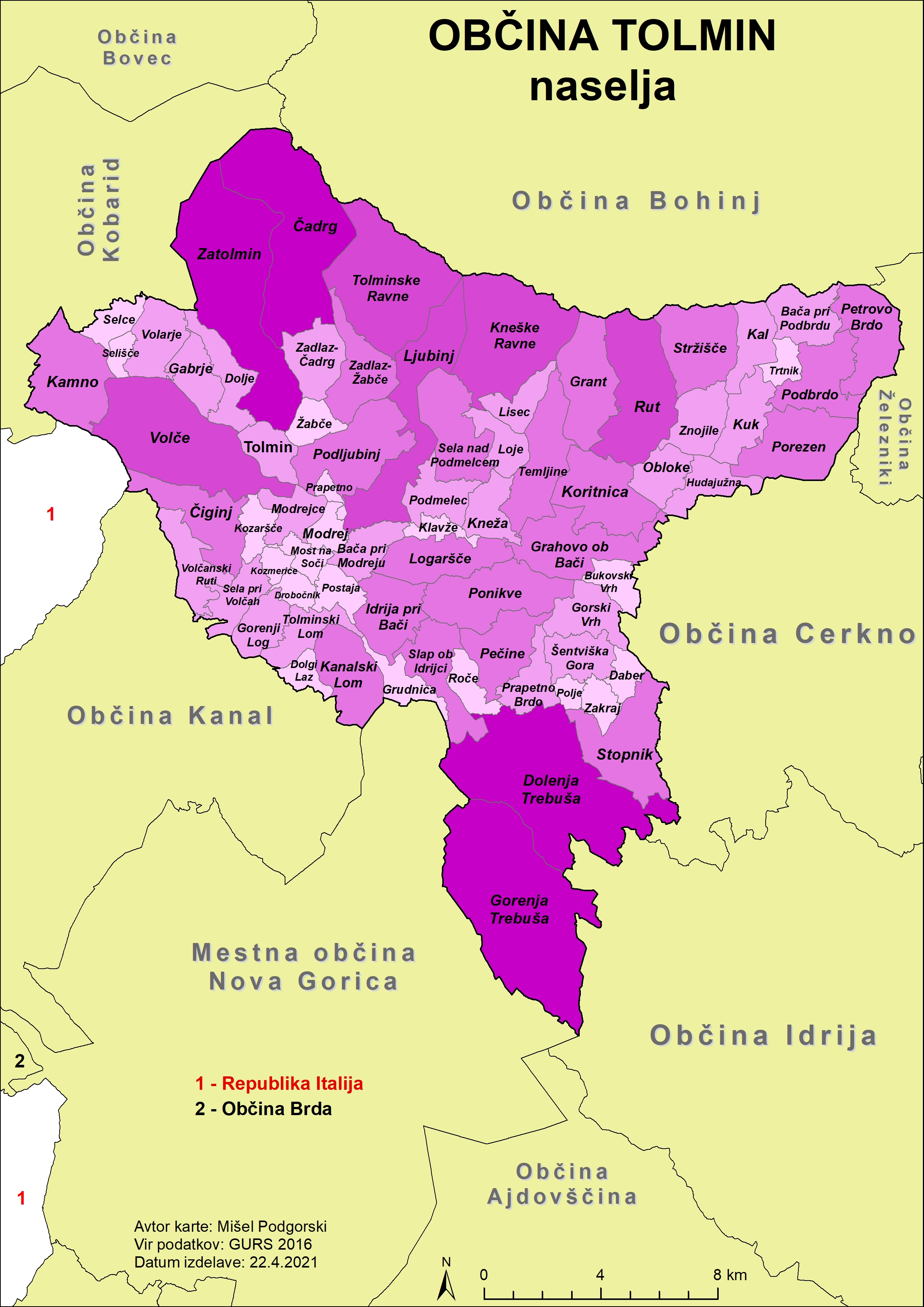
Villages in the municipality

In addition to the municipal seat of Tolmin, the municipality also includes the following settlements:

- Bača pri Modreju
- Bača pri Podbrdu
- Bukovski Vrh
- Čadrg
- Čiginj
- Daber
- Dolenja Trebuša
- Dolgi Laz
- Dolje
- Drobočnik
- Gabrje
- Gorenja Trebuša
- Gorenji Log
- Gorski Vrh
- Grahovo ob Bači
- Grant
- Grudnica
- Hudajužna
- Idrija pri Bači
- Kal
- Kamno
- Kanalski Lom
- Klavže
- Kneške Ravne
- Kneža
- Koritnica
- Kozaršče
- Kozmerice
- Kuk
- Lisec
- Ljubinj
- Logaršče
- Loje
- Modrej
- Modrejce
- Most na Soči
- Obloke
- Pečine
- Petrovo Brdo
- Podbrdo
- Podmelec
- Polje
- Poljubinj
- Ponikve
- Porezen
- Postaja
- Prapetno
- Prapetno Brdo
- Roče
- Rut
- Sela nad Podmelcem
- Sela pri Volčah
- Selce
- Selišče
- Šentviška Gora
- Slap ob Idrijci
- Stopnik
- Stržišče
- Temljine
- Tolminske Ravne
- Tolminski Lom
- Trtnik
- Volarje
- Volčanski Ruti
- Volče
- Žabče
- Zadlaz–Čadrg
- Zadlaz–Žabče
- Zakraj
- Zatolmin
- Znojile

== Culture ==
Tolmin has been the venue for the Metaldays heavy metal festival, Punk Rock Holiday, and Soča Reggae Riversplash festival.

== Politics ==
The Municipality of Tolmin is governed by a mayor elected every four years by popular vote, and a municipal council of 22 members. The local political scene is relatively diversified, with no prevalence of a particular party, although the conservative New Slovenia and Slovenian People's Party tend to receive a higher proportion of votes than their national average. Traditionally, the left-wing and liberal parties have been stronger in the town center, whereas the countryside tends to favor conservative parties. In national politics, the Tolmin electoral district has highly favored the conservative Slovenian Democratic Party, but this is largely due to the prevalence of this party in the other two municipalities forming the district, (Bovec and Kobarid).
