= Znojile, Tolmin =

Znojile
- Village
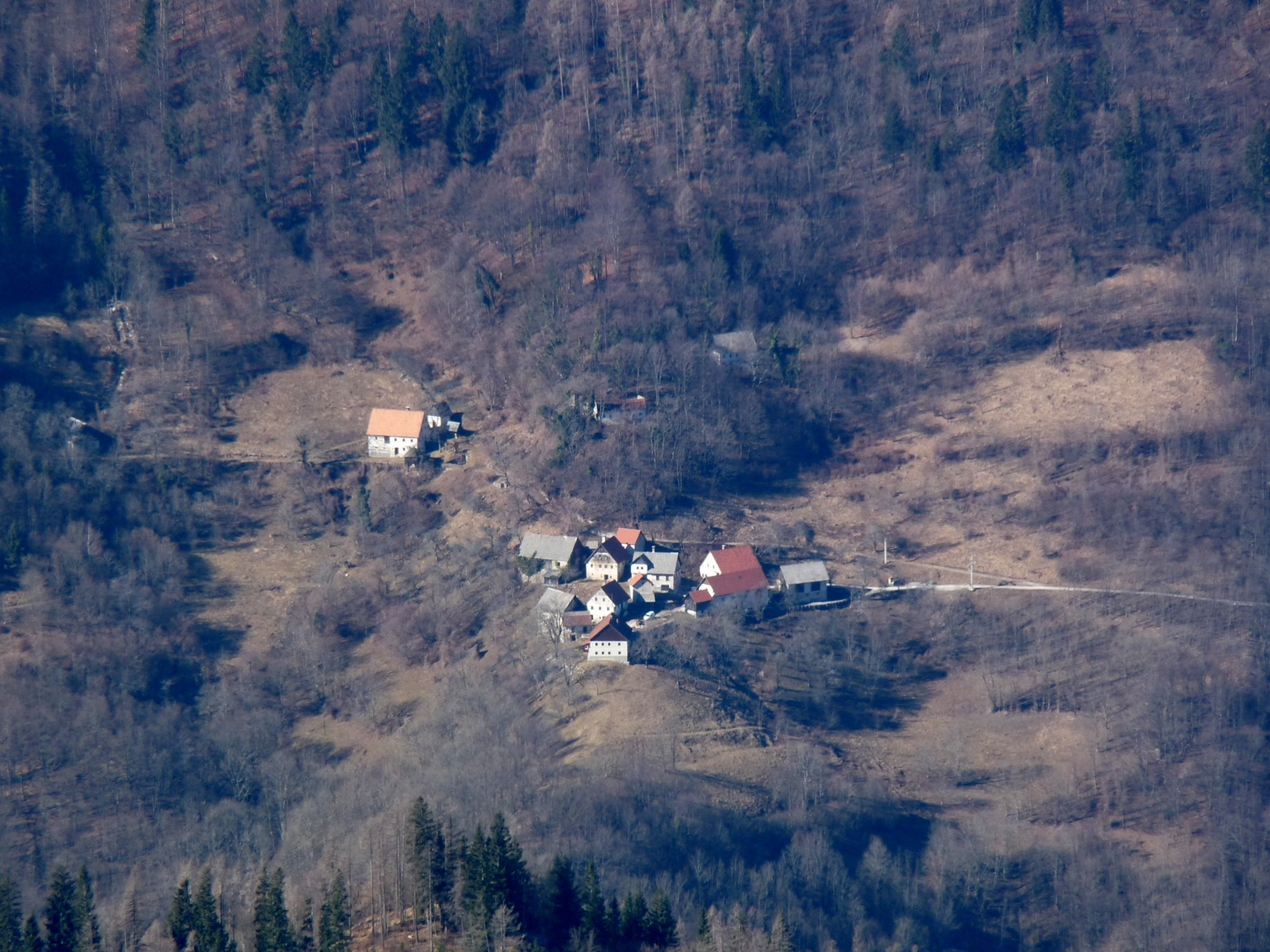

- Location in Slovenia
- Coordinates: 46°11′39.58″N 13°55′23.55″E
- Country: Slovenia
- Traditional region: Slovenian Littoral
- Statistical region: Gorizia
- Municipality: Tolmin

Area
  - Total: 3.83 km^{2} (1.48 sq mi)
- Elevation: 675.1 m (2,215 ft)

Population (2002)
  - Total: 16

Znojile (pronounced [znɔˈjiːlɛ], German: Windfall) is a small settlement in the hills north of Hudajužna in the Municipality of Tolmin in the Littoral region of Slovenia.

== Name ==
The name Znojile is derived from *znoji(d)lo 'sunny or sun-facing area' from the verb *znojiti 'to be warmed by the sun'. The name therefore refers to the geographical orientation of the place.
