= Kozmerice =

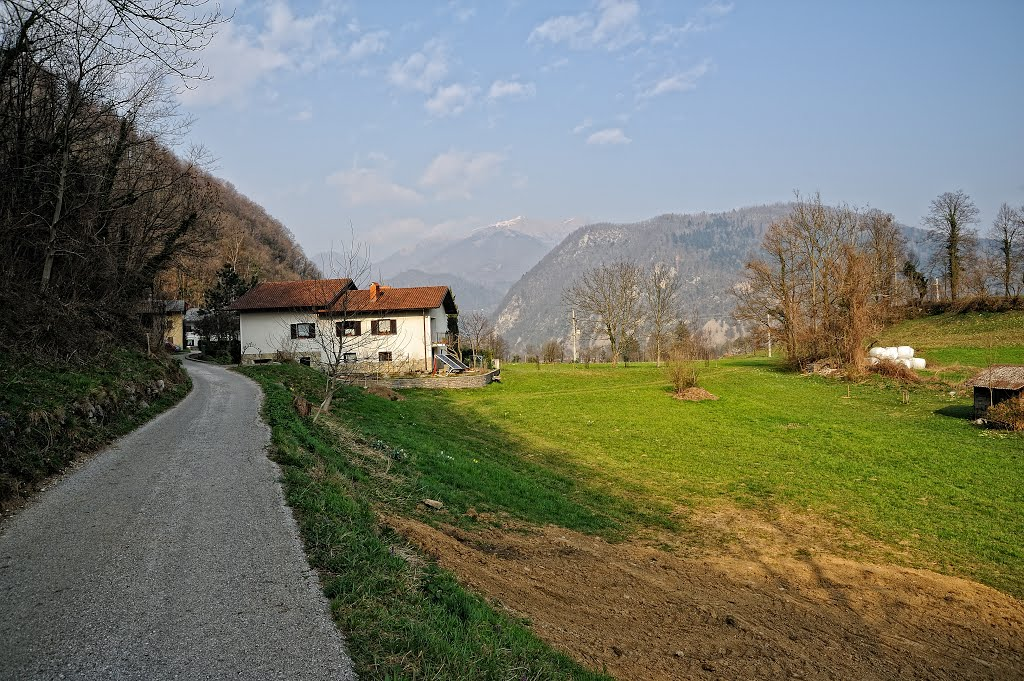

- Location in Slovenia
- Coordinates: 46°9′1.39″N 13°44′6.19″E
- Country: Slovenia
- Traditional region: Slovenian Littoral
- Statistical region: Gorizia
- Municipality: Tolmin

Area
  - Total: 0.98 km^{2} (0.38 sq mi)
- Elevation: 241.7 m (793 ft)

Population (2002)
  - Total: 25

Kozmerice (pronounced [kɔzmɛˈɾiːtsɛ]) is a small settlement on the right bank of the Soča River in the Municipality of Tolmin in the Littoral region of Slovenia.
