= Grudnica =

- Location in Slovenia
- Coordinates: 46°6′47.49″N 13°47′24.87″E
- Country: Slovenia
- Traditional region: Slovenian Littoral
- Statistical region: Gorizia
- Municipality: Tolmin

Area
  - Total: 2.33 km^{2} (0.90 sq mi)
- Elevation: 853.3 m (2,800 ft)

Population (2002)
  - Total: 18

Grudnica (pronounced [ˈɡɾuːdnitsa]) is a small dispersed settlement in the hills above the valley of the Idrijca River in the Municipality of Tolmin in the Littoral region of Slovenia.
