= Modrej =

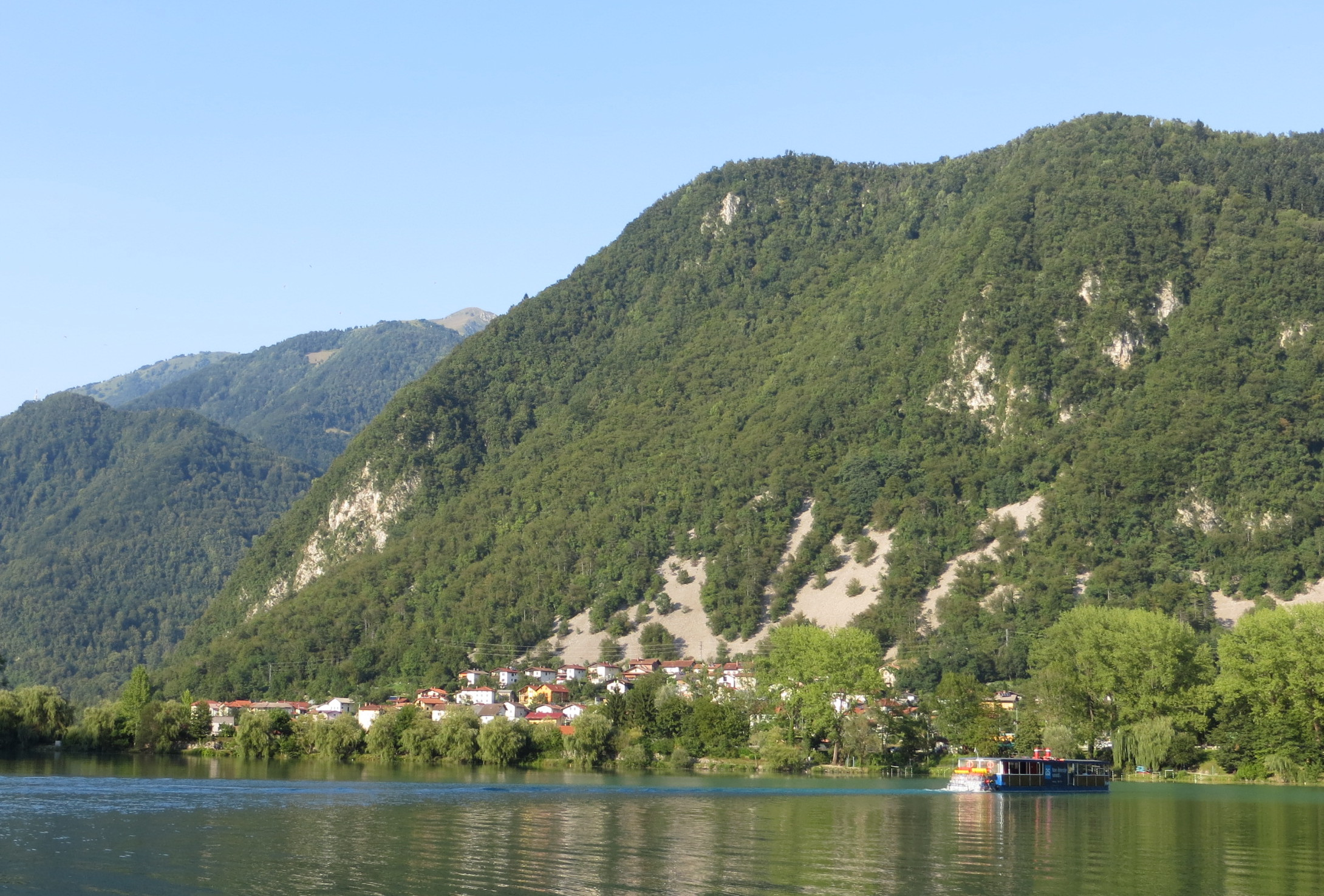

- Location in Slovenia
- Coordinates: 46°9′32.42″N 13°44′59.56″E
- Country: Slovenia
- Traditional region: Slovenian Littoral
- Statistical region: Gorizia
- Municipality: Tolmin

Area
  - Total: 1.6 km^{2} (0.62 sq mi)
- Elevation: 172.6 m (566 ft)

Population (2002)
  - Total: 284

Modrej (pronounced [mɔˈdɾeːi̯]; in older sources also Modreja) is a settlement on the left bank of the Soča River, just north of Most na Soči, in the Municipality of Tolmin in the Littoral region of Slovenia.

== Name ==
Modrej was attested in historical sources as Modrea in 1377. The name is believed to be derived from the nickname *Modrějь, formed from the anthroponym *Modrъ, based on the color adjective *modrъ 'blue'. It is unlikely that the name is derived from the adjective *mǫdrъ 'wise'.
