= Trtnik =

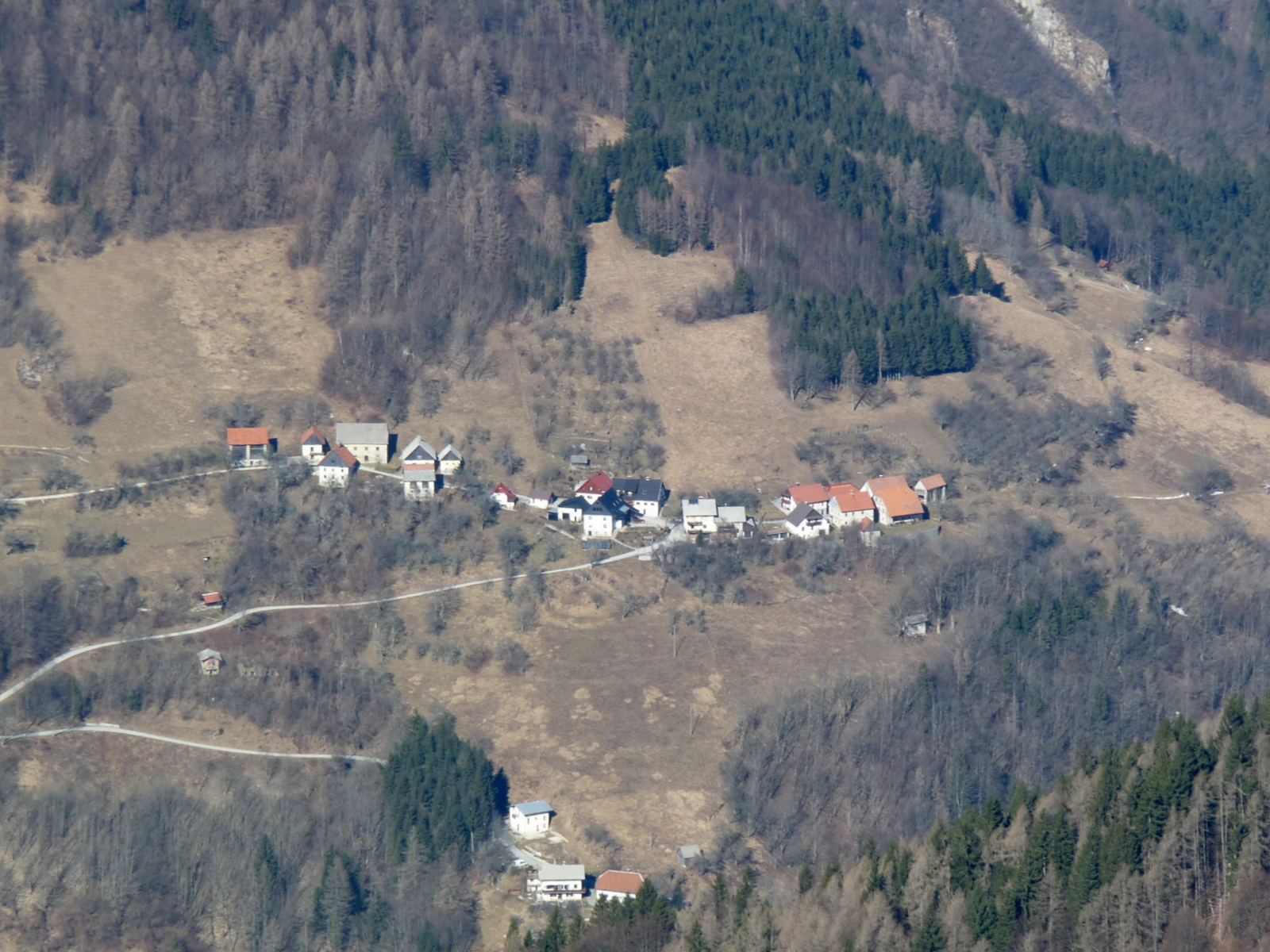

- Location in Slovenia
- Coordinates: 46°12′36.26″N 13°57′43.35″E
- Country: Slovenia
- Traditional region: Slovenian Littoral
- Statistical region: Gorizia
- Municipality: Tolmin

Area
  - Total: 1.51 km^{2} (0.58 sq mi)
- Elevation: 655.8 m (2,152 ft)

Population (2002)
  - Total: 33

Trtnik (pronounced [ˈtəɾtnik], German: Trennich) is a small village southwest of Podbrdo in the Municipality of Tolmin in the Littoral region of Slovenia.
