= Sela pri Volčah =

- Location in Slovenia
- Coordinates: 46°8′23.45″N 13°43′4.16″E
- Country: Slovenia
- Traditional region: Slovenian Littoral
- Statistical region: Gorizia
- Municipality: Tolmin

Area
  - Total: 3.16 km^{2} (1.22 sq mi)
- Elevation: 237.7 m (780 ft)

Population (2002)
  - Total: 89

Sela pri Volčah (pronounced [ˈseːla pri ˈʋoːu̯tʃax]) is a settlement on the right bank of the Soča River, southwest of Most na Soči, in the Municipality of Tolmin in the Littoral region of Slovenia.

== Name ==
The name of the settlement was changed from Sela to Sela pri Volčah in 1955.
