= Porezen, Tolmin =

Porezen
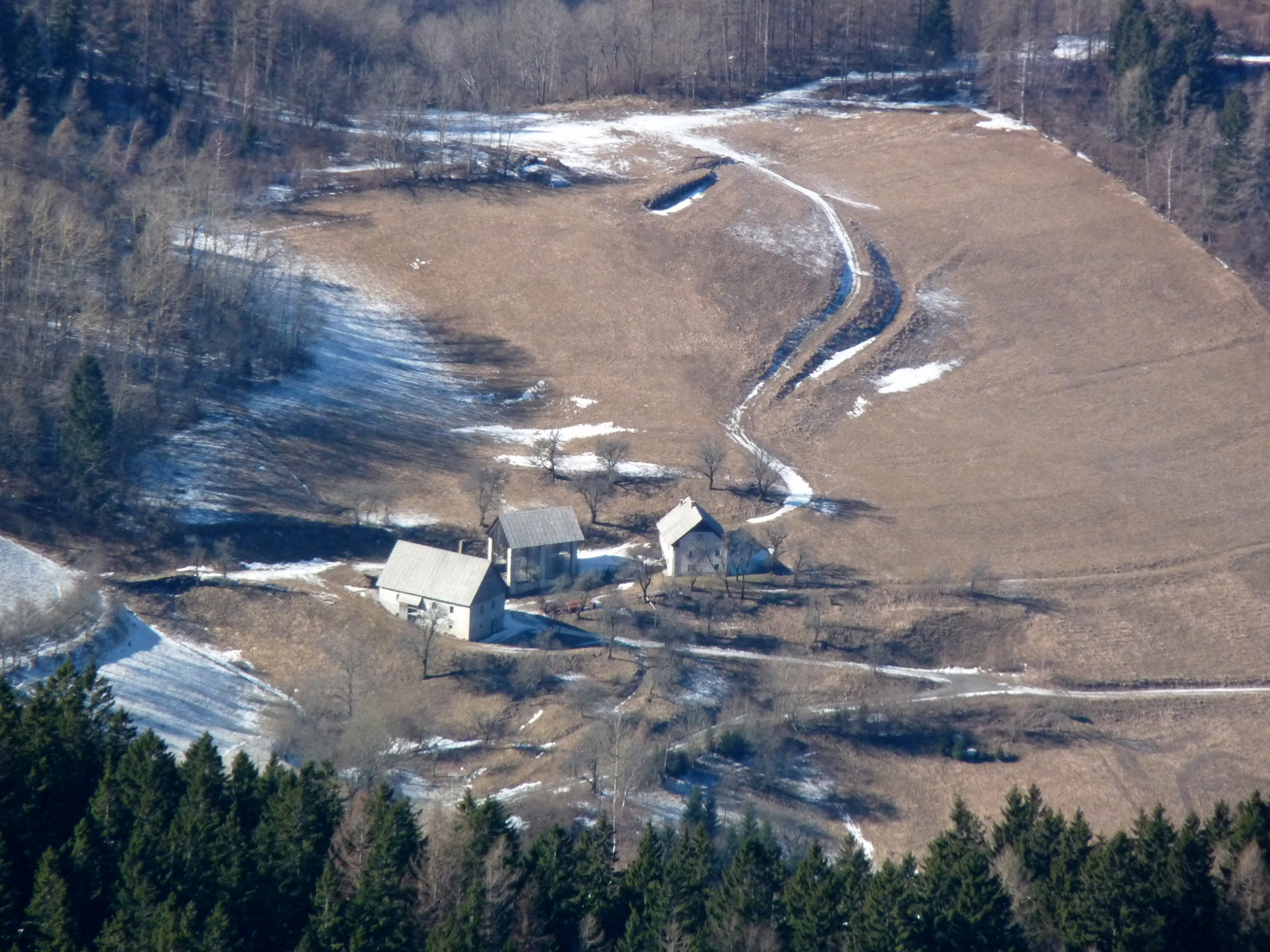

- Location in Slovenia
- Coordinates: 46°11′6.23″N 13°56′34.16″E
- Country: Slovenia
- Traditional region: Slovenian Littoral
- Statistical region: Gorizia
- Municipality: Tolmin

Area
  - Total: 7.3 km^{2} (2.8 sq mi)
- Elevation: 870.7 m (2,857 ft)

Population (2002)
  - Total: 8

Porezen (pronounced [ˈpoːɾɛzən]; in older sources also Porzen) is a dispersed settlement on the northern slopes of a hill also named Porezen above the Bača Valley in the Municipality of Tolmin in the Littoral region of Slovenia.

== Name ==
Porezen was attested in historical sources as Poworsona in 1523, Possenikh in 1560, Potporsna in 1591, and Podporsnam in 1633. The name is reconstructed with the prefix pod 'below' as *Podvrěsьno, referring to a location below a peak called *Vrěsni vrh or *Vresnik—referring to the treeless peak southeast of the village now also called Porezen (elevation: 1,630 meters or 5,350 feet), which was covered in heather (Slovene: vresje).
