= Gabrje, Tolmin =

Gabrje
- Location in Slovenia
- Coordinates: 46°12′4.23″N 13°41′55.59″E
- Country: Slovenia
- Traditional region: Slovenian Littoral
- Statistical region: Gorizia
- Municipality: Tolmin

Area
  - Total: 3.05 km^{2} (1.18 sq mi)
- Elevation: 201.9 m (662 ft)

Population (2002)
  - Total: 115

Gabrje (pronounced [ˈɡaːbəɾjɛ]) is a settlement in the Municipality of Tolmin in the Littoral region of Slovenia.

== Geography ==
Gabrje stands along the road from Tolmin to Kobarid on the left bank of the Soča River at the foot of Mount Vodel (1,053 meters or 3,455 feet) and Cold Peak (Slovene: Mrzli vrh; 1,360 meters or 4,460 feet), which is also the highest point in the territory of the village. In addition to the main settlement of Gabrje, the village includes the hamlets of V Grapi to the southeast and Na Pesku to the northwest. The slopes above the village are forested, and there are tilled fields and meadows on the remnants of terraces along the river.
