= Modrejce =

- Location in Slovenia
- Coordinates: 46°9′46.65″N 13°44′28″E
- Country: Slovenia
- Traditional region: Slovenian Littoral
- Statistical region: Gorizia
- Municipality: Tolmin

Area
  - Total: 2.77 km^{2} (1.07 sq mi)
- Elevation: 172.6 m (566 ft)

Population (2002)
  - Total: 117

Modrejce (pronounced [mɔˈdɾeːi̯tsɛ]) is a settlement on the right bank of the Soča River north of Most na Soči in the Municipality of Tolmin in the Littoral region of Slovenia.
