= Čadrg =

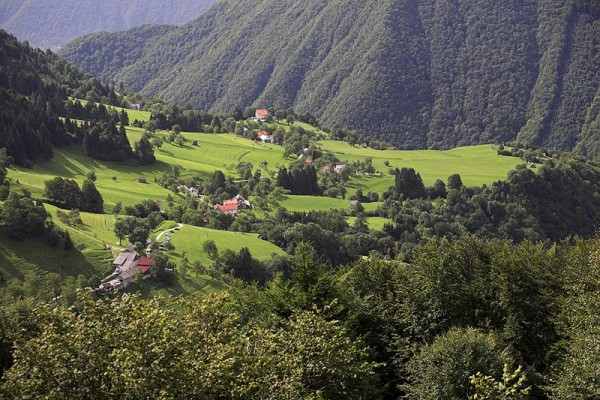

- Location in Slovenia
- Coordinates: 46°13′20.48″N 13°44′2.59″E
- Country: Slovenia
- Traditional region: Slovenian Littoral
- Statistical region: Gorizia
- Municipality: Tolmin

Area
  - Total: 17.56 km^{2} (6.78 sq mi)
- Elevation: 682.5 m (2,239 ft)

Population (2002)
  - Total: 30

Čadrg (pronounced [ˈtʃaːdəɾk], in older sources also Čadra and Čaderg) is a settlement in the Municipality of Tolmin in the Littoral region of Slovenia. It lies within Triglav National Park.

== Name ==
Čadrg was attested in written sources in 1257 as Zadroc (and as Zadroch and Çadrach in 1377, Tschadrach in 1515, and Tschadra in 1523). The name probably derives from the Slavic personal name *Ča(je)dragъ, referring to an early resident of the place. Discounted theories of the name's derivation include development from Latin cataracta 'waterfall' or Friulian chadrèe 'chair' (referring to a terrace).

== Gallery ==
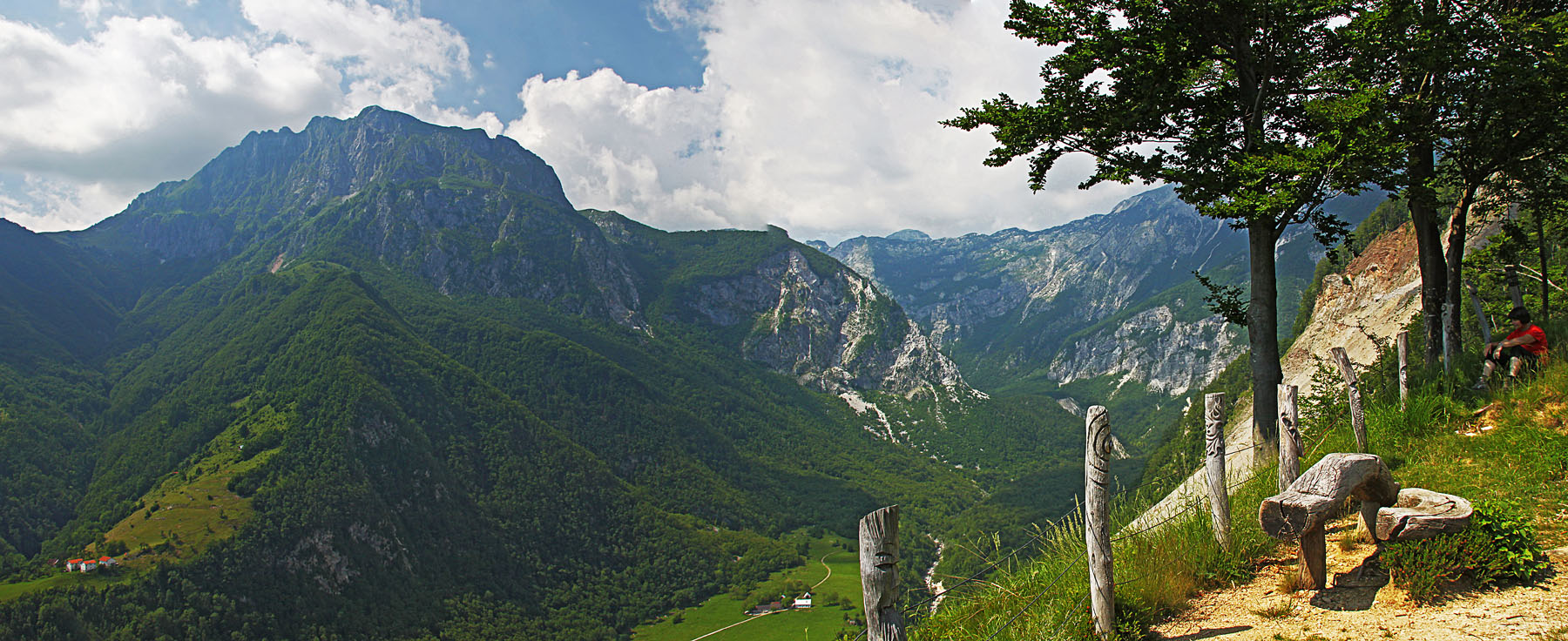
The view from Zlejžn

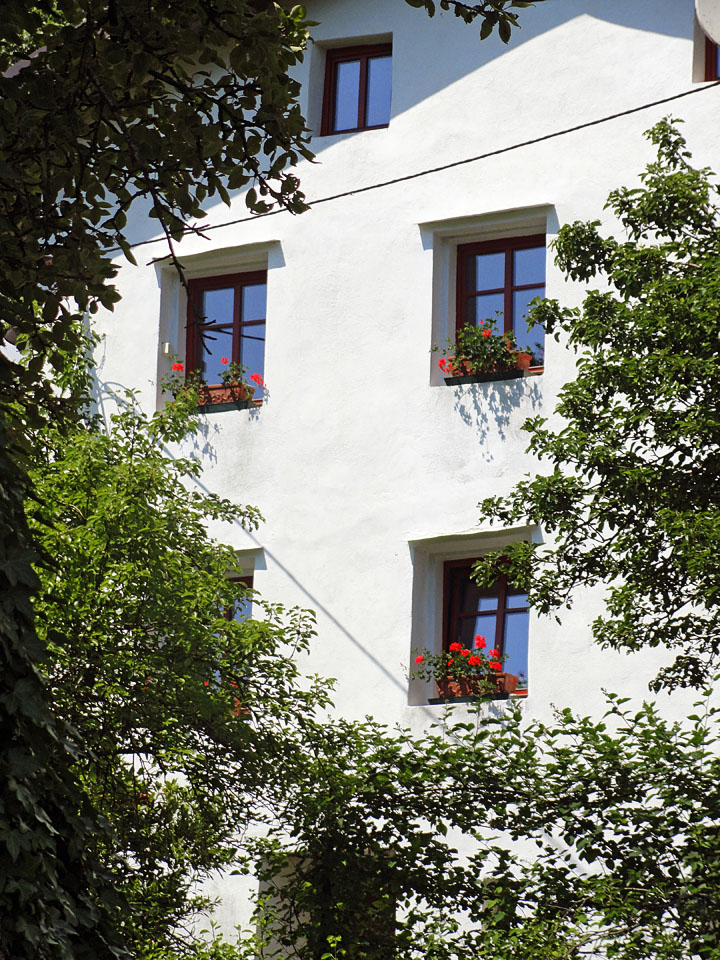
A house in Čadrg
