= Čiginj =

- Village
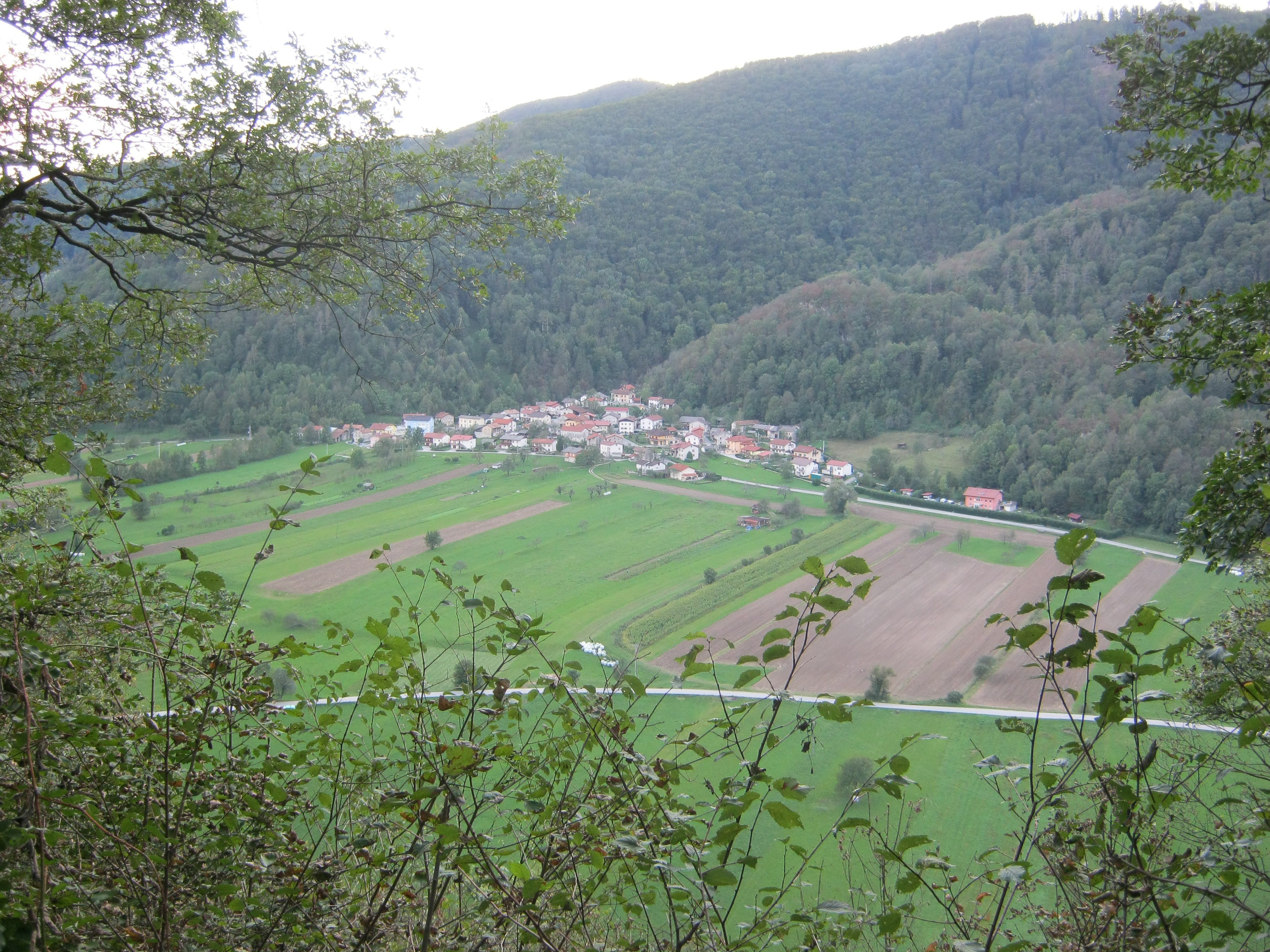

- Location in Slovenia
- Coordinates: 46°9′47.02″N 13°42′35.18″E
- Country: Slovenia
- Traditional region: Slovenian Littoral
- Statistical region: Gorizia
- Municipality: Tolmin

Area
  - Total: 5.64 km^{2} (2.18 sq mi)
- Elevation: 231.7 m (760 ft)

Population (2002)
  - Total: 176

Čiginj (pronounced [tʃiˈɡiːn]) is a settlement south of Volče in the Municipality of Tolmin in the Littoral region of Slovenia.

== Name ==
The etymology of the name Čiginj is unclear. It is believed to be of Romance origin, and it may show a Romance reflex of Latin adjective calcīnus 'stone, lime'.

== History ==
During the Second World War, the Italian authorities operated a concentration camp at Čiginj before the Gonars concentration camp was established.
