= Klavže =

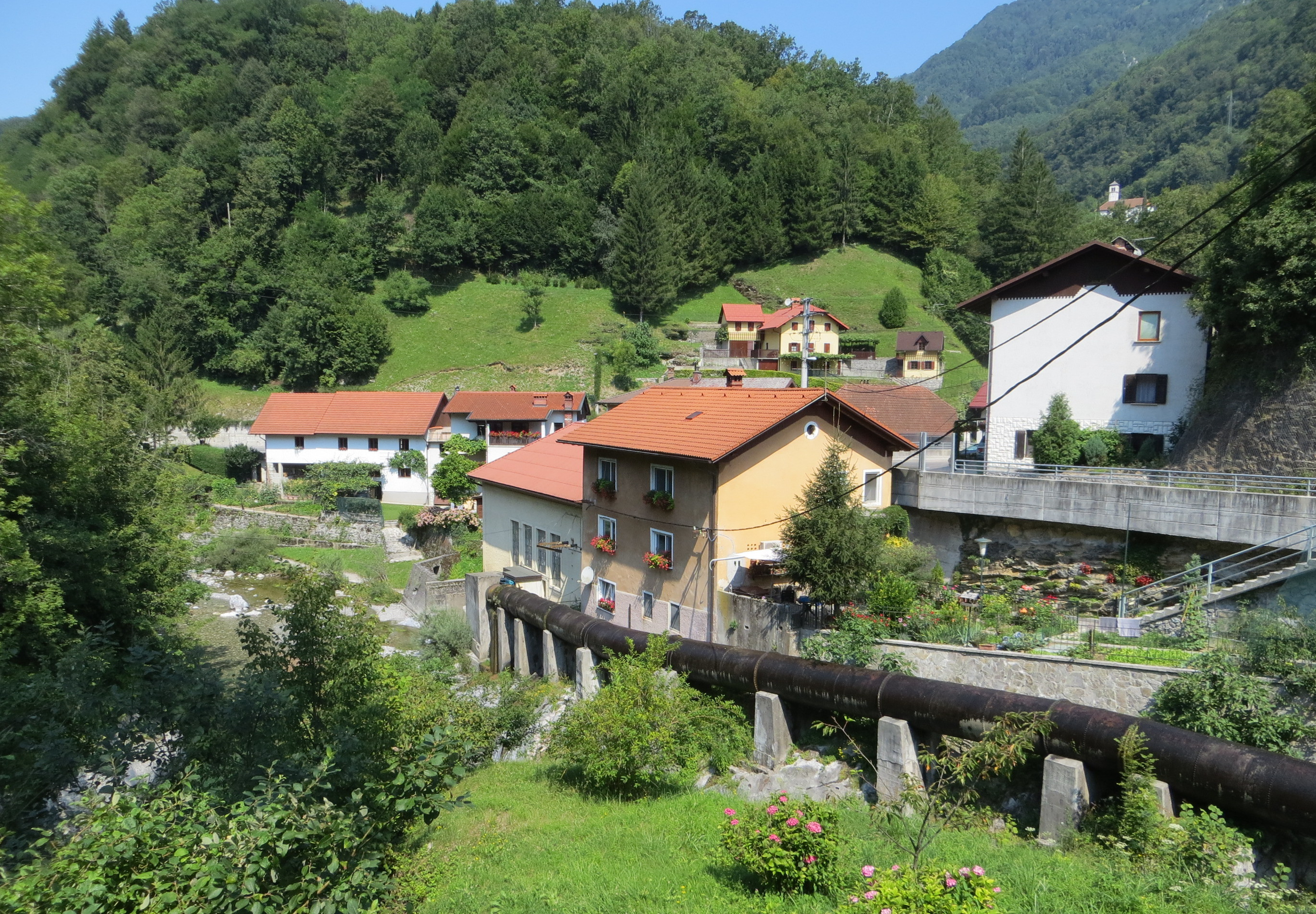

- Location in Slovenia
- Coordinates: 46°9′36.69″N 13°48′37.61″E
- Country: Slovenia
- Traditional region: Slovenian Littoral
- Statistical region: Gorizia
- Municipality: Tolmin

Area
  - Total: 1.28 km^{2} (0.49 sq mi)
- Elevation: 197.9 m (649 ft)

Population (2002)
  - Total: 76

Klavže (pronounced [ˈklaːu̯ʒɛ]) is a settlement in the Bača Valley in the Municipality of Tolmin in the Littoral region of Slovenia.

== Name ==
Klavže was attested in written sources in 1763–87 as Klausa. The name is derived from the Slovene common noun klavže 'logging sluice' (< German Klause < Middle High German klûse < Medieval Latin clūsa 'barrier'), referring to logging activity in the area.

== Infrastructure ==
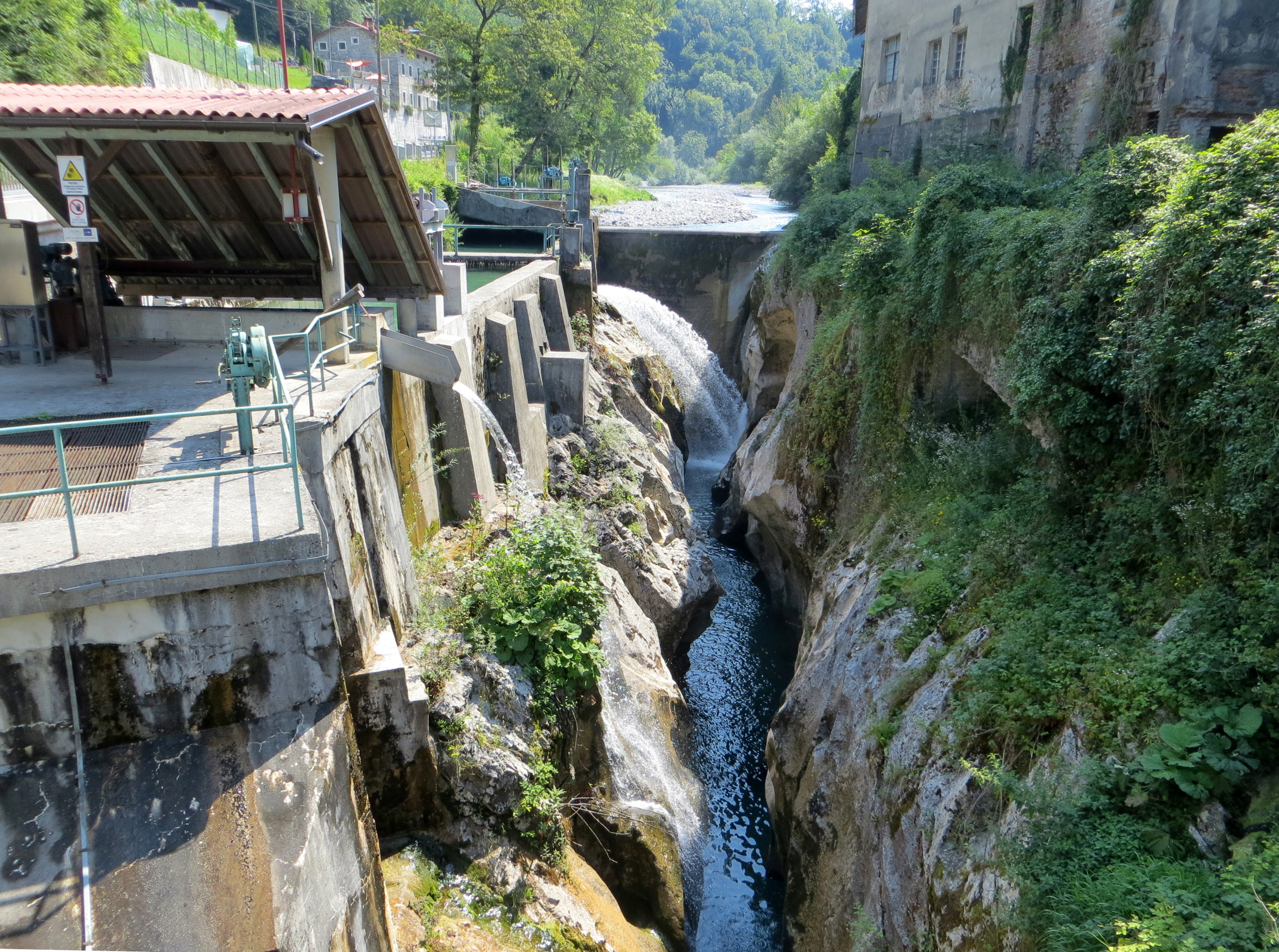
Podmelec Hydroelectric Plant

The Bohinj Railway line runs through the settlement. The Podmelec Hydroelectric Plant was built at Klavže in 1931 by Luigi Corvi.
