= Polje, Tolmin =

Polje
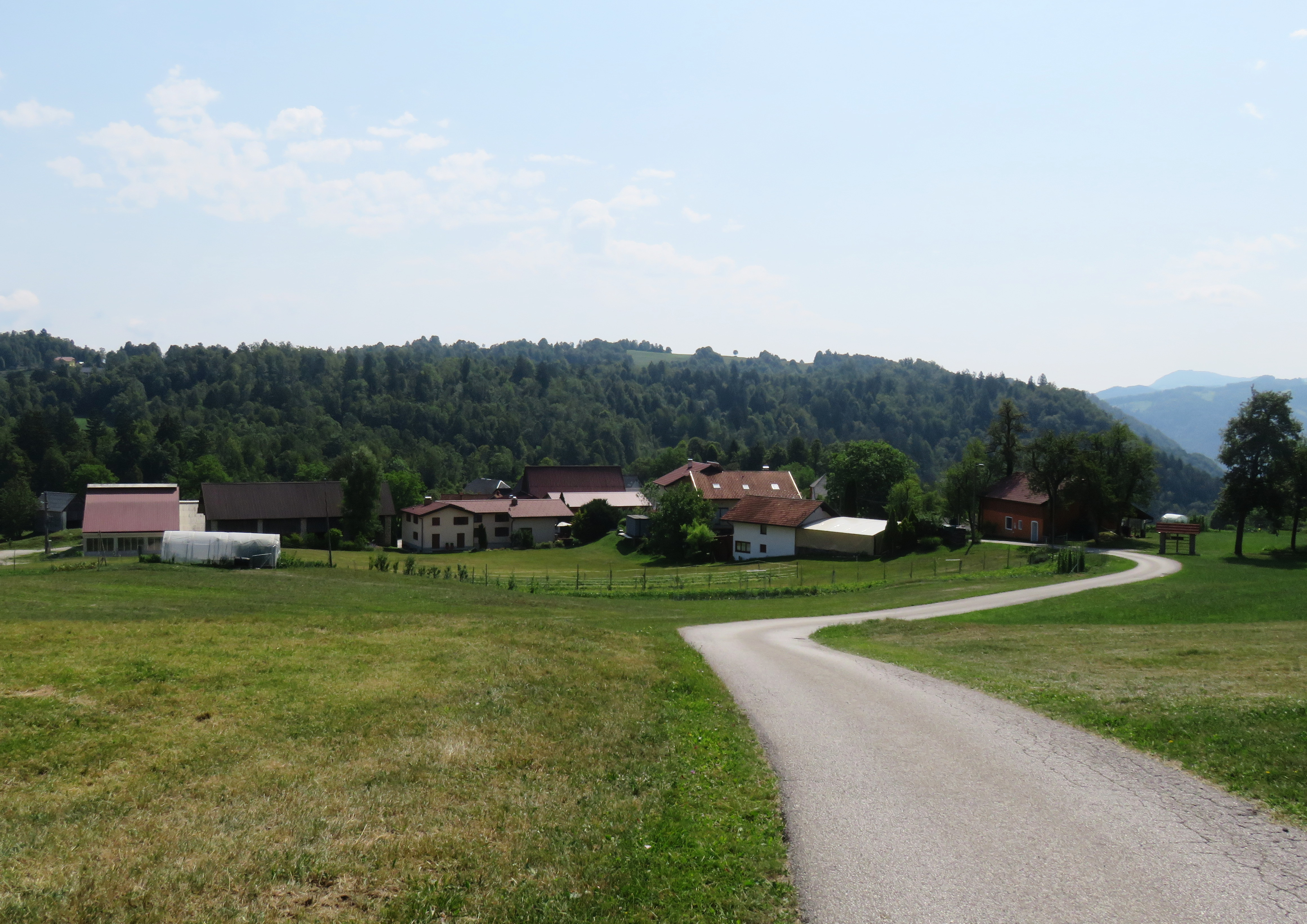

- Location in Slovenia
- Coordinates: 46°6′39.79″N 13°51′43.98″E
- Country: Slovenia
- Traditional region: Slovenian Littoral
- Statistical region: Gorizia
- Municipality: Tolmin

Area
  - Total: 0.9 km^{2} (0.35 sq mi)
- Elevation: 584.9 m (1,919 ft)

Population (2002)
  - Total: 36

Polje (pronounced [ˈpoːljɛ]) is a small village southwest of Šentviška Gora in the Municipality of Tolmin in the Littoral region of Slovenia.
