= Roče =

- Location in Slovenia
- Coordinates: 46°7′6.85″N 13°48′50.61″E
- Country: Slovenia
- Traditional region: Slovenian Littoral
- Statistical region: Gorizia
- Municipality: Tolmin

Area
  - Total: 2.11 km^{2} (0.81 sq mi)
- Elevation: 353.2 m (1,159 ft)

Population (2002)
  - Total: 64

Roče (pronounced [ˈɾoːtʃɛ]) is a dispersed settlement on the right bank of the Idrijca River in the Municipality of Tolmin in the Littoral region of Slovenia.

== Church ==
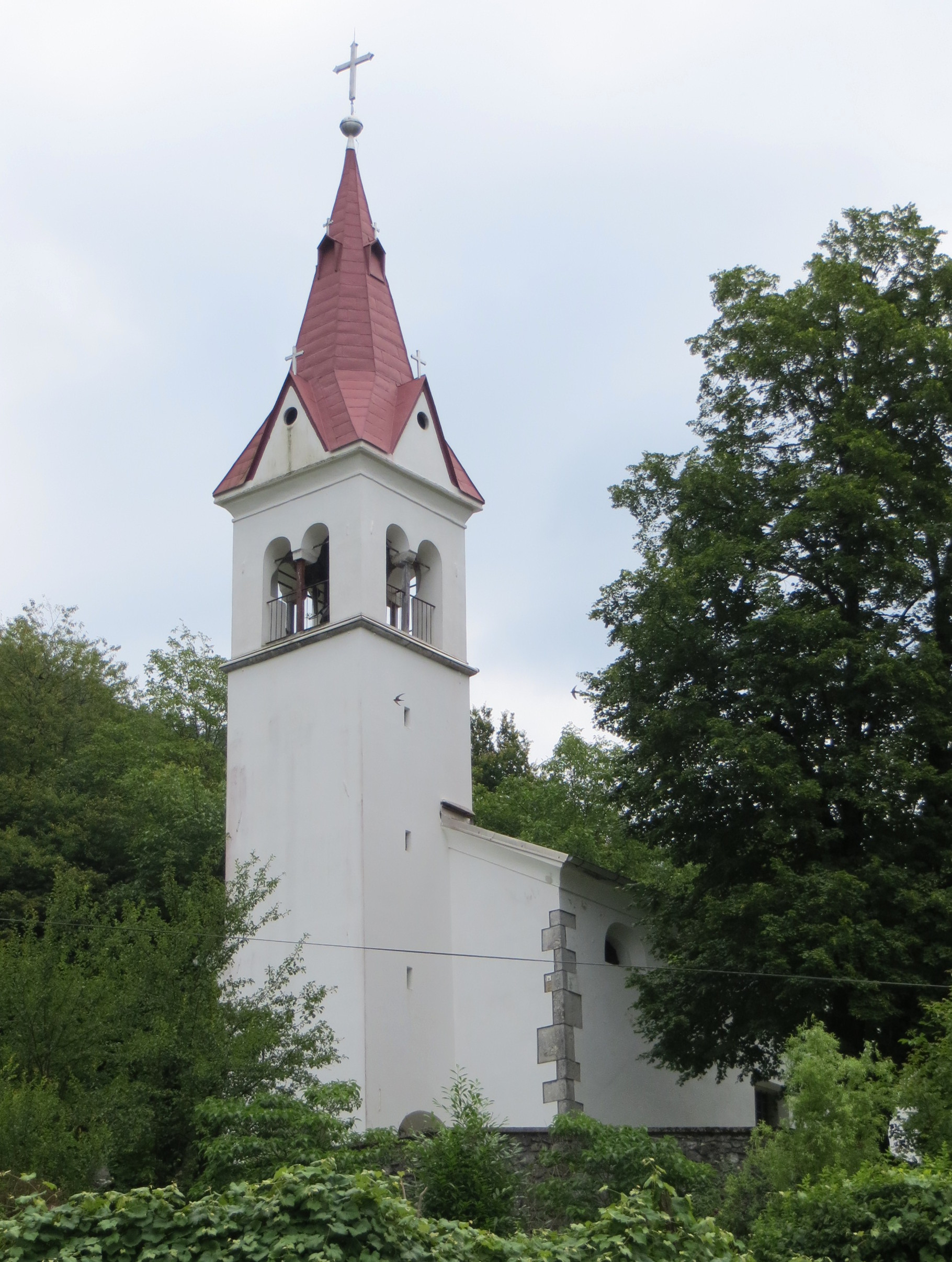
Saint John the Evangelist Church

The church in the village is dedicated to Saint John the Evangelist and the year 1550 is carved over the entrance to the church. Roče was first mentioned in the land terrier of Tolmin in 1377.
