= Prapetno =

- Location in Slovenia
- Coordinates: 46°10′25.38″N 13°45′13.74″E
- Country: Slovenia
- Traditional region: Slovenian Littoral
- Statistical region: Gorizia
- Municipality: Tolmin

Area
  - Total: 0.72 km^{2} (0.28 sq mi)
- Elevation: 199.5 m (655 ft)

Population (2002)
  - Total: 130

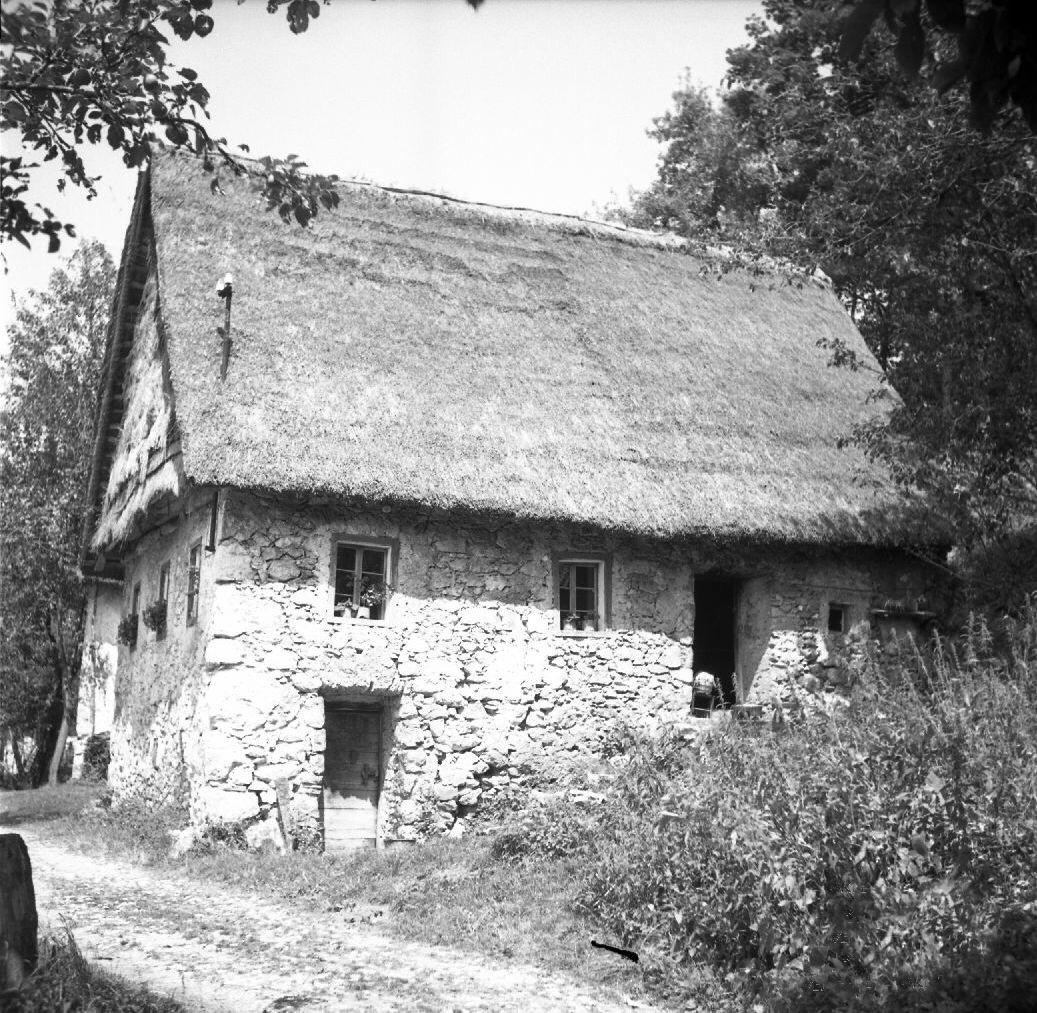
"Bajta" near Blašec, Prapetno.

Prapetno (pronounced [ˈpɾaːpɛtnɔ]) is a settlement on the left bank of the Soča River, southeast of Tolmin, in the Littoral region of Slovenia.
