= Lisec, Tolmin =

Lisec
- Location in Slovenia
- Coordinates: 46°11′37.55″N 13°50′18.09″E
- Country: Slovenia
- Traditional region: Slovenian Littoral
- Statistical region: Gorizia
- Municipality: Tolmin

Area
  - Total: 2.52 km^{2} (0.97 sq mi)
- Elevation: 573.6 m (1,882 ft)

Lisec (pronounced [ˈliːsəts]) is a small dispersed settlement in the hills north of Kneža in the Municipality of Tolmin in the Littoral region of Slovenia.
