= Zakraj, Tolmin =

Zakraj
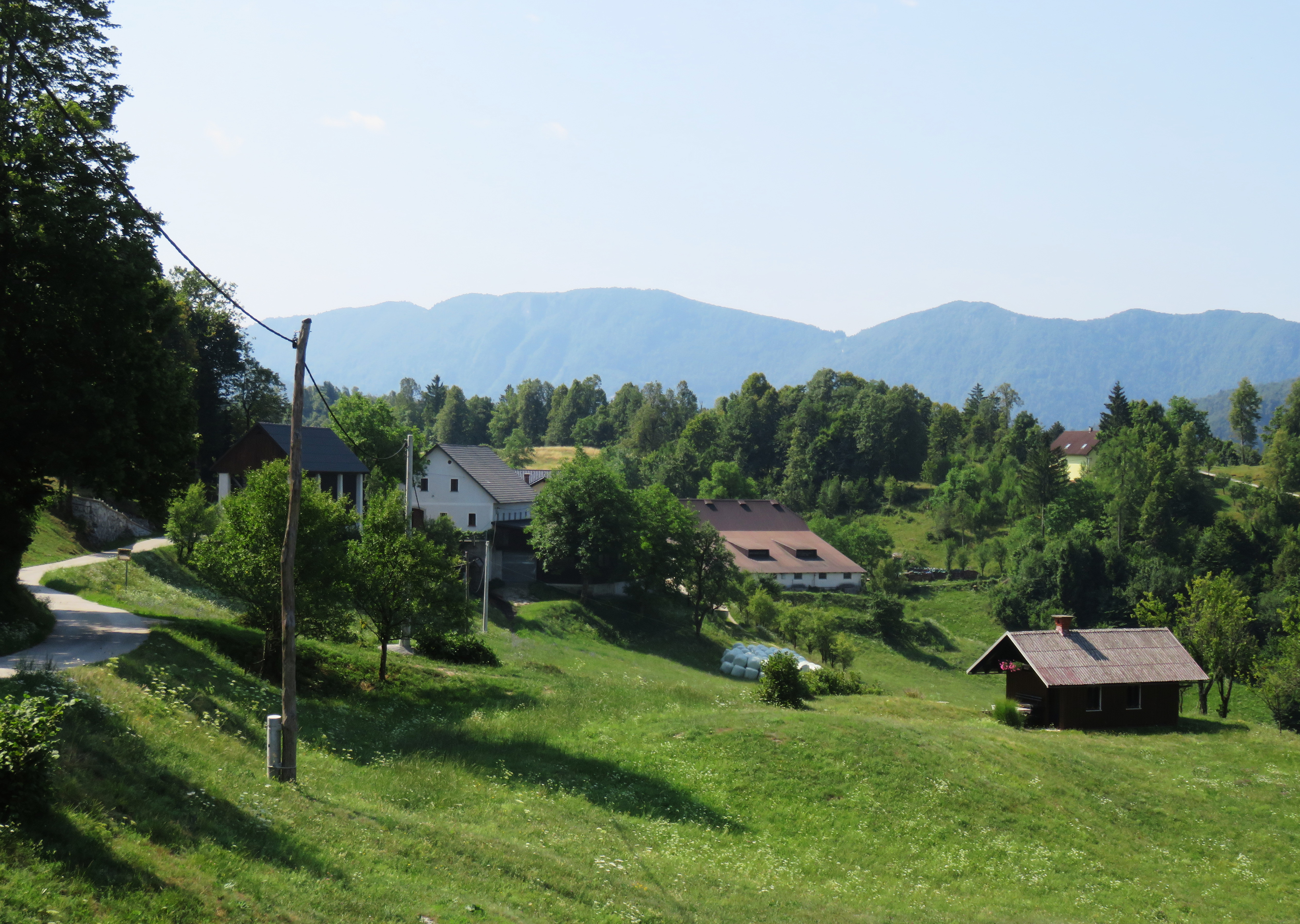

- Location in Slovenia
- Coordinates: 46°6′45.66″N 13°52′21.58″E
- Country: Slovenia
- Traditional region: Slovenian Littoral
- Statistical region: Gorizia
- Municipality: Tolmin

Area
  - Total: 1.67 km^{2} (0.64 sq mi)
- Elevation: 638.7 m (2,095 ft)

Population (2002)
  - Total: 30

Zakraj (pronounced [zaˈkɾai̯]) is a settlement south of Šentviška Gora in the Municipality of Tolmin in the Littoral region of Slovenia. It includes the hamlet of Kos.
