= Dolenja Trebuša =

- Location in Slovenia
- Coordinates: 46°5′38.21″N 13°50′20.04″E
- Country: Slovenia
- Traditional region: Slovenian Littoral
- Statistical region: Gorizia
- Municipality: Tolmin

Area
  - Total: 22.15 km^{2} (8.55 sq mi)
- Elevation: 189 m (620 ft)

Population (2002)
  - Total: 274

Dolenja Trebuša (pronounced [dɔˈleːnja tɾɛˈbuːʃa], in older sources Dolenja Tribuša) is a dispersed settlement in the Municipality of Tolmin in the Littoral region of Slovenia. It lies in the Idrijca Valley, surrounded by mountain plateaus.

== Church ==
Saint James's Church

The parish church in the settlement is dedicated to Saint James and belongs to the Koper Diocese.
