= Drobočnik =

- Location in Slovenia
- Coordinates: 46°8′23.29″N 13°44′17.32″E
- Country: Slovenia
- Traditional region: Slovenian Littoral
- Statistical region: Gorizia
- Municipality: Tolmin

Area
  - Total: 1.34 km^{2} (0.52 sq mi)
- Elevation: 362.3 m (1,189 ft)

Population (2002)
  - Total: 41

Drobočnik (pronounced [dɾɔˈboːtʃnik]) is a settlement on the left bank of the Soča River south of Most na Soči in the Littoral region of Slovenia.
