= Kal, Tolmin =

Kal
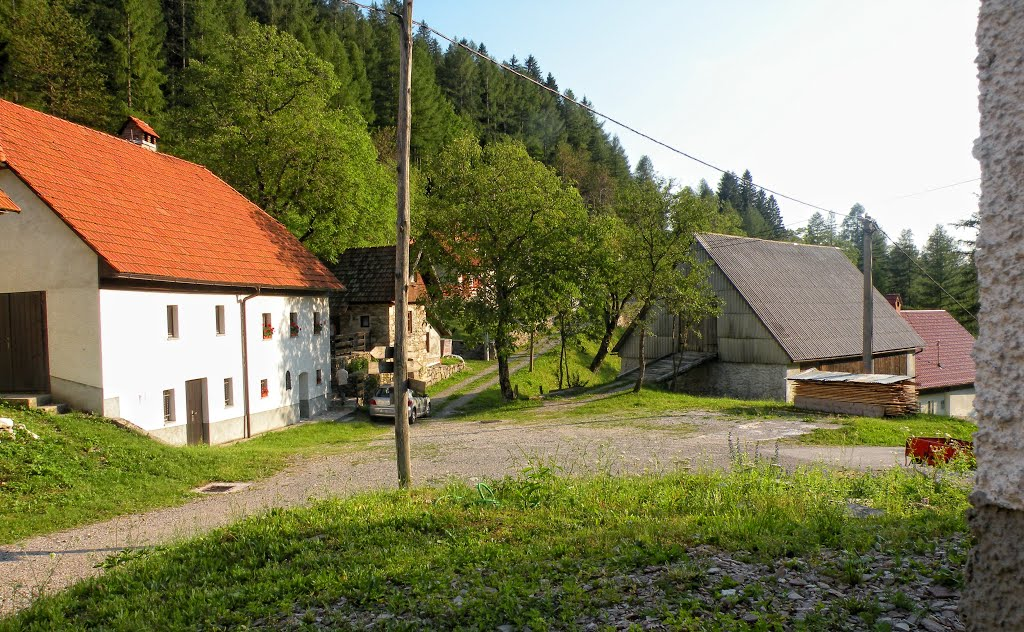

- Location in Slovenia
- Coordinates: 46°12′55.31″N 13°56′25.54″E
- Country: Slovenia
- Traditional region: Slovenian Littoral
- Statistical region: Gorizia
- Municipality: Tolmin

Area
  - Total: 3.31 km^{2} (1.28 sq mi)
- Elevation: 819.8 m (2,690 ft)

Population (2002)
  - Total: no permanent residents

Kal (pronounced [ˈkaːu̯]) is a small village in the mountains north of the Bača Valley in the Municipality of Tolmin in the Littoral region of Slovenia. It no longer has any permanent residents.
