= Daber, Tolmin =

Daber
- Village
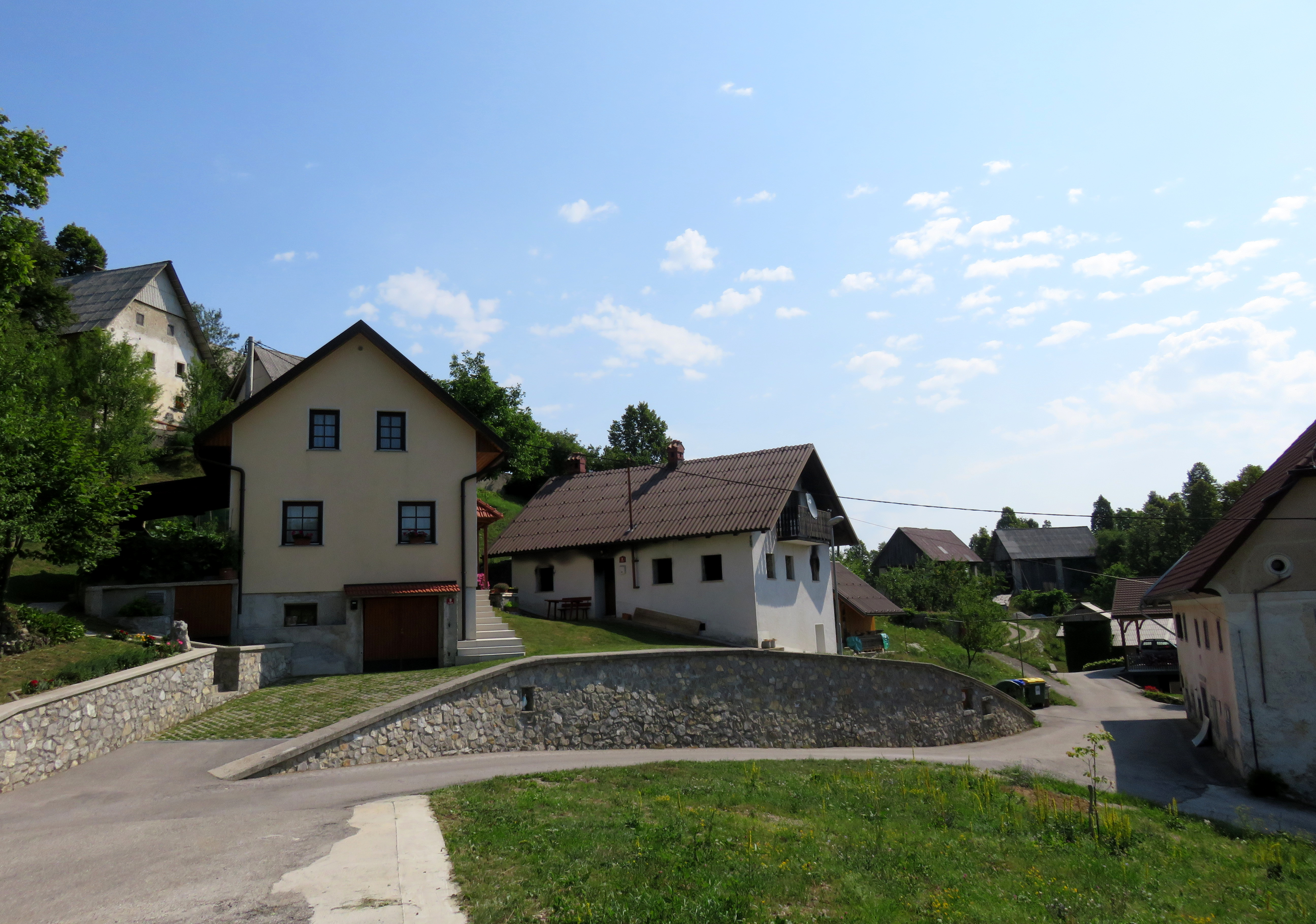

- Location in Slovenia
- Coordinates: 46°6′56.14″N 13°53′5.62″E
- Country: Slovenia
- Traditional region: Slovenian Littoral
- Statistical region: Gorizia
- Municipality: Tolmin

Area
  - Total: 1.51 km^{2} (0.58 sq mi)
- Elevation: 641.9 m (2,106 ft)

Population (2002)
  - Total: 29

Daber (pronounced [ˈdaːbəɾ]) is a small settlement in the Municipality of Tolmin in the Littoral region of Slovenia. It lies on a plateau above the valley of the Idrijca River. It includes the hamlet of Nart.

== Name ==
The name Daber is believed to derive from the Slovene common noun debèr 'ravine'. If so, it is related to names like Deber (a neighborhood of Augsdorf in Velden am Wörther See, Austria), Dabar (in Croatia), and Debar (in North Macedonia).
