= Tolminski Lom =

- Location in Slovenia
- Coordinates: 46°7′38.28″N 13°44′47.69″E
- Country: Slovenia
- Traditional region: Slovenian Littoral
- Statistical region: Gorizia
- Municipality: Tolmin

Area
  - Total: 3.04 km^{2} (1.17 sq mi)
- Elevation: 599.6 m (1,967 ft)

Population (2002)
  - Total: 81

Tolminski Lom (pronounced [tɔlˈmiːnski ˈloːm]) is a settlement in the hills south of Most na Soči in the Municipality of Tolmin in the Littoral region of Slovenia.
