= Stopnik, Tolmin =

Stopnik
- Location in Slovenia
- Coordinates: 46°5′32.24″N 13°53′4.98″E
- Country: Slovenia
- Traditional region: Slovenian Littoral
- Statistical region: Gorizia
- Municipality: Tolmin

Area
  - Total: 8.06 km^{2} (3.11 sq mi)
- Elevation: 205.3 m (674 ft)

Population (2002)
  - Total: 94

Stopnik (pronounced [ˈstoːpnik]) is a dispersed settlement in the valley of the Idrijca River in the Municipality of Tolmin in the Littoral region of Slovenia.
