= Grant, Tolmin =

Grant
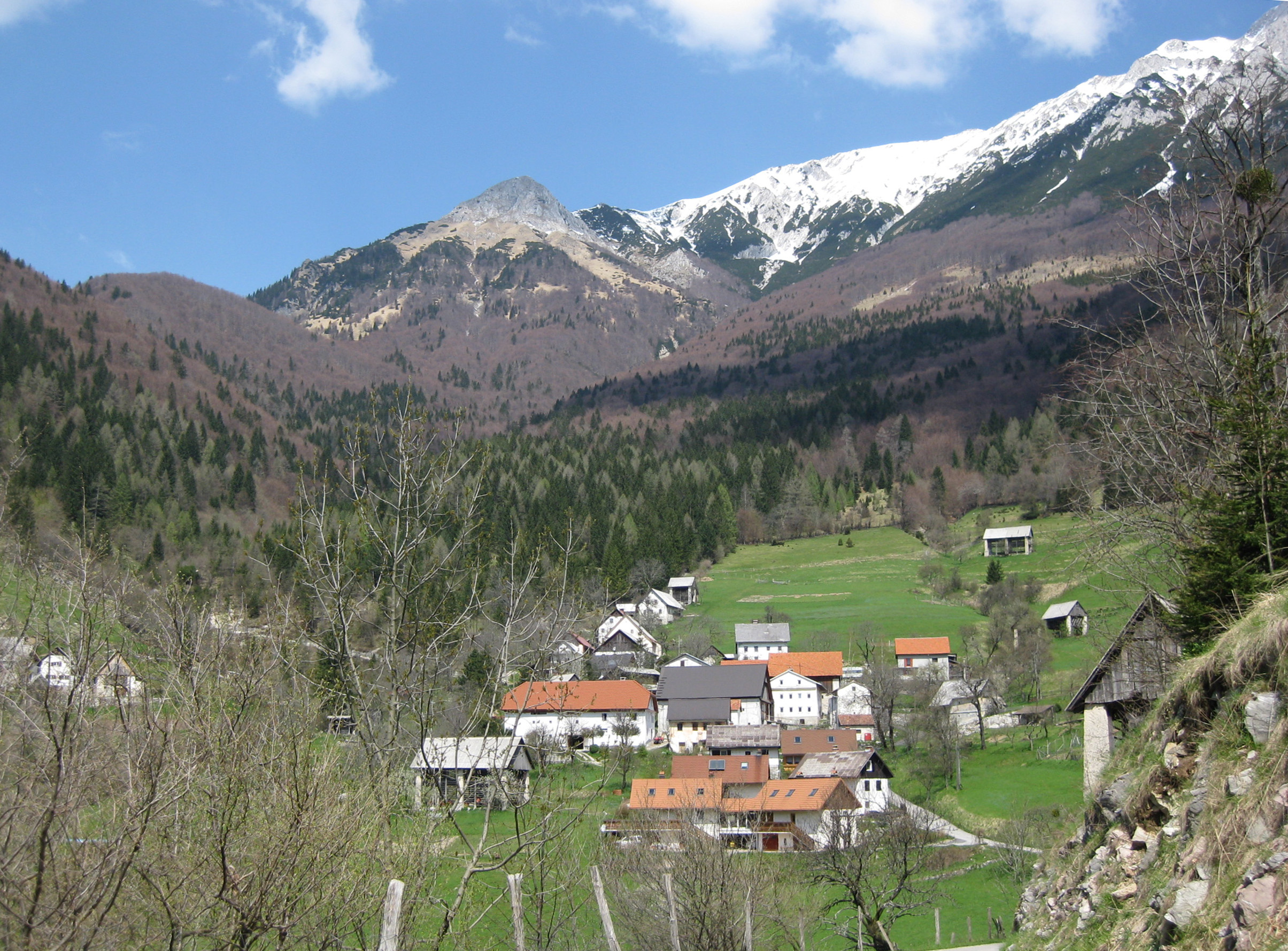

- Location in Slovenia
- Coordinates: 46°12′26.61″N 13°52′41.22″E
- Country: Slovenia
- Traditional region: Slovenian Littoral
- Statistical region: Gorizia
- Municipality: Tolmin

Area
  - Total: 6.67 km^{2} (2.58 sq mi)
- Elevation: 735.9 m (2,414 ft)

Population (2002)
  - Total: 24

Grant (pronounced [ˈɡɾaːnt]) is a small village in the hills north of Grahovo ob Bači in the Municipality of Tolmin in the Littoral region of Slovenia.

== Name ==
Grant was attested in historical sources as Grant in 1377, Granndt in 1515, and Grandt in 1523, among other spellings. The name is derived from either Middle High German grant 'trough, channel' (referring to a terrain feature) or possibly Middle High German *grant (< Old High German grente), referring to gravelly soil.
