= Zadlaz–Čadrg =

- Location in Slovenia
- Coordinates: 46°12′21.29″N 13°45′9.73″E
- Country: Slovenia
- Traditional region: Slovenian Littoral
- Statistical region: Gorizia
- Municipality: Tolmin

Area
  - Total: 4.05 km^{2} (1.56 sq mi)
- Elevation: 413.2 m (1,356 ft)

Population (2002)
  - Total: 31

Zadlaz–Čadrg (pronounced [zadˈlas ˈtʃaːdəɾk]; Slovene: Zadlaz - Čadrg) is a settlement in the hills northeast of Tolmin in the Littoral region of Slovenia. It is accessible by road through the village of Zatolmin.
