= Dolgi Laz =

- Location in Slovenia
- Coordinates: 46°6′51.09″N 13°44′27.34″E
- Country: Slovenia
- Traditional region: Slovenian Littoral
- Statistical region: Gorizia
- Municipality: Tolmin

Area
  - Total: 1.47 km^{2} (0.57 sq mi)
- Elevation: 669.4 m (2,196 ft)

Population (2002)
  - Total: 8

Dolgi Laz (pronounced [ˈdoːu̯ɡi ˈlas]) is a small settlement in the hills south of Most na Soči in the Municipality of Tolmin in the Littoral region of Slovenia.
