= Selce, Tolmin =

Selce
- Location in Slovenia
- Coordinates: 46°13′7.3″N 13°38′59.58″E
- Country: Slovenia
- Traditional region: Slovenian Littoral
- Statistical region: Gorizia
- Municipality: Tolmin

Area
  - Total: 2.02 km^{2} (0.78 sq mi)
- Elevation: 385.7 m (1,265 ft)

Population (2002)
  - Total: 12

Selce (pronounced [ˈseːltsɛ]) is a small village northeast of Kamno in the Municipality of Tolmin in the Littoral region of Slovenia.
