= Volčanski Ruti =

- Location in Slovenia
- Coordinates: 46°8′46.5″N 13°41′43″E
- Country: Slovenia
- Traditional region: Slovenian Littoral
- Statistical region: Gorizia
- Municipality: Tolmin

Area
  - Total: 4.03 km^{2} (1.56 sq mi)
- Elevation: 568.3 m (1,865 ft)

Population (2002)
  - Total: 22

Volčanski Ruti (pronounced [ʋɔu̯ˈtʃaːnski ˈɾuːti]) is a dispersed settlement in the hills to the south of Volče in the Municipality of Tolmin in the Littoral region of Slovenia, close to the border with Italy.

The local church is dedicated to Saint Florian and belongs to the Parish of Volče.
