= Poljubinj =

- Location in Slovenia
- Coordinates: 46°11′3.84″N 13°45′6.35″E
- Country: Slovenia
- Traditional region: Slovenian Littoral
- Statistical region: Gorizia
- Municipality: Tolmin

Area
  - Total: 7.83 km^{2} (3.02 sq mi)
- Elevation: 263.1 m (863 ft)

Population (2002)
  - Total: 424

Poljubinj (pronounced [pɔljuˈbiːn]; Italian: Polubino) is a settlement east of Tolmin in the Littoral region of Slovenia.

== Geography ==
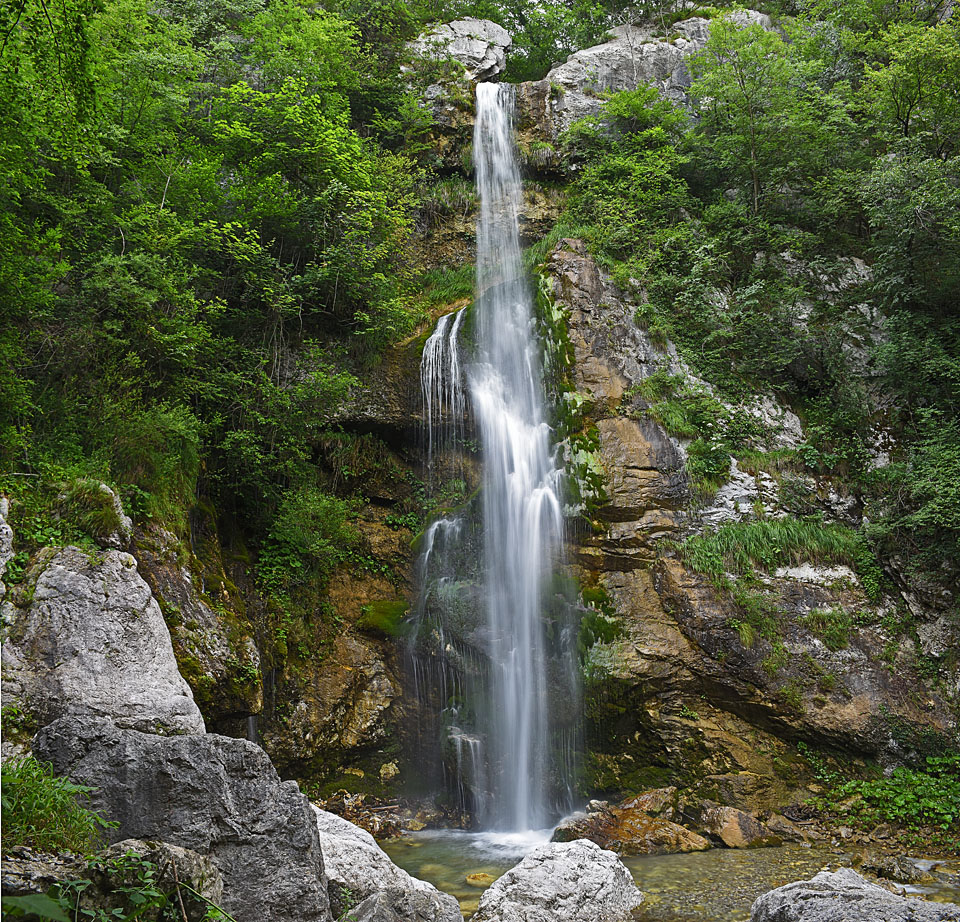
Beri Falls

Podljubinj is located on a terrace above the left bank of the Tolminka River, a tributary of the Soča River. Beri Falls (Slovene: slap Beri) is located about 800 meters (2,600 ft) east-northeast of the village center on Godiča Creek, a tributary of the Soča River.

== Cultural heritage ==
Poljubinj is known for egg decoration during the local šempav holiday, which is named after the former Saint Paul's Church on Žabče Peak (Slovene: Žabijski vrh, 772 meters or 2,533 feet) and is celebrated on the first Sunday in May. Eggs are colored red, and verses and designs are written and painted on them.
