= Prapetno Brdo =

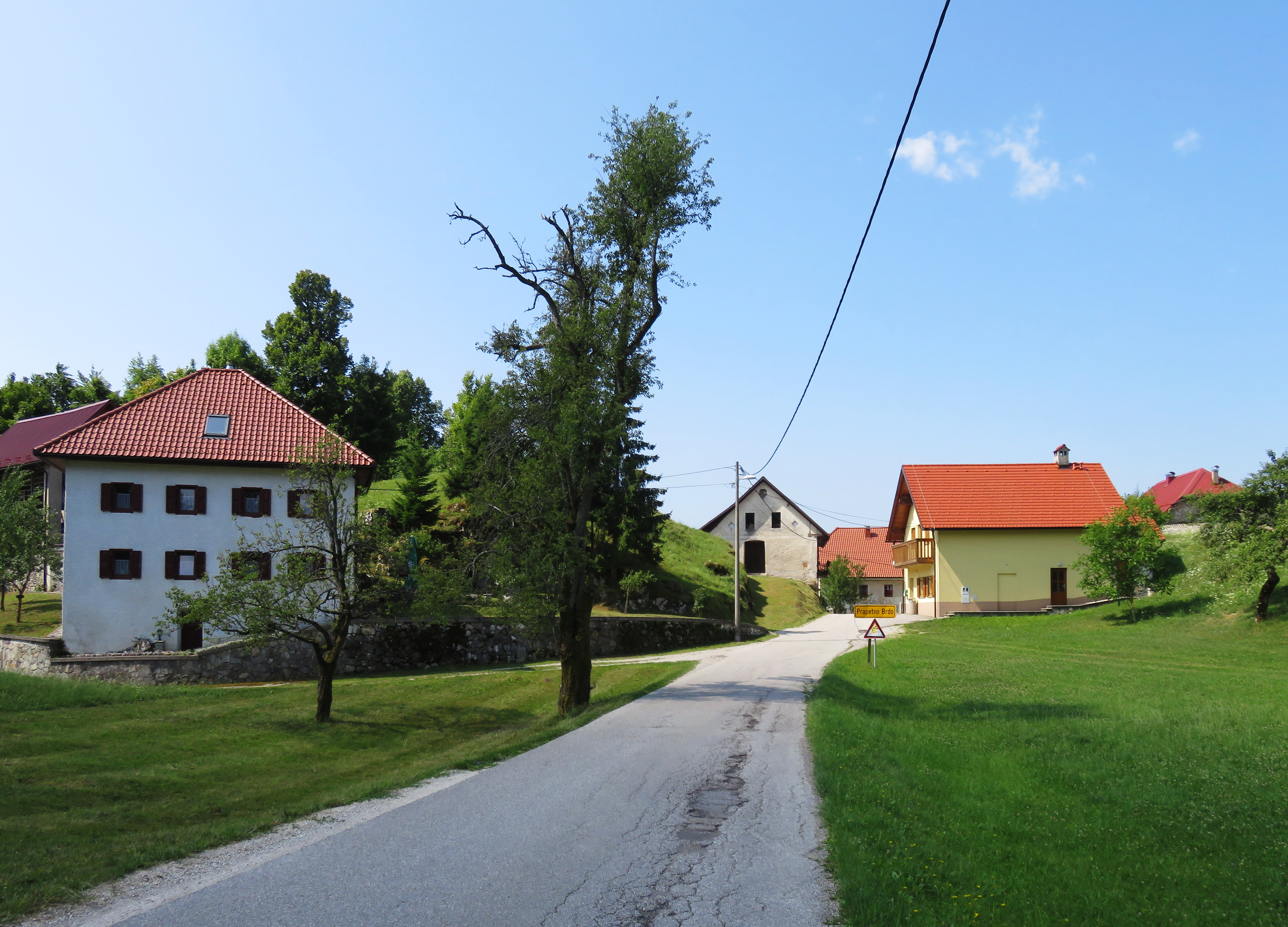

- Location in Slovenia
- Coordinates: 46°6′38.95″N 13°50′52.76″E
- Country: Slovenia
- Traditional region: Slovenian Littoral
- Statistical region: Gorizia
- Municipality: Tolmin

Area
  - Total: 2.96 km^{2} (1.14 sq mi)
- Elevation: 658.1 m (2,159 ft)

Population (2002)
  - Total: 114

Prapetno Brdo (pronounced [ˈpɾaːpɛtnɔ ˈbəɾdɔ]) is a dispersed settlement in the Municipality of Tolmin in the Littoral region of Slovenia. It lies west of Šentviška Gora on the southern slopes of the mountains to the north of the Idrijca Valley. It includes the hamlets of Trata, Dolina, Golubovc, and Sleme.
