= Gorenji Log =

- Location in Slovenia
- Coordinates: 46°7′45.92″N 13°43′7.82″E
- Country: Slovenia
- Traditional region: Slovenian Littoral
- Statistical region: Gorizia
- Municipality: Tolmin

Area
  - Total: 3.01 km^{2} (1.16 sq mi)
- Elevation: 227.9 m (748 ft)

Population (2002)
  - Total: 46

Gorenji Log (pronounced [ɡɔˈɾeːnji ˈloːk]) is a small settlement on the left bank of the Soča River southwest of Most na Soči in the Municipality of Tolmin in the Littoral region of Slovenia. The Bohinj Railway line runs through the settlement.
