= Slap ob Idrijci =

- Location in Slovenia
- Coordinates: 46°7′12.65″N 13°48′16.49″E
- Country: Slovenia
- Traditional region: Slovenian Littoral
- Statistical region: Gorizia
- Municipality: Tolmin

Area
  - Total: 5.04 km^{2} (1.95 sq mi)
- Elevation: 180 m (590 ft)

Population (2002)
  - Total: 242

Slap ob Idrijci (pronounced [ˈslaːp ɔb ˈiːdɾii̯tsi]) is a settlement on the right bank of the Idrijca River in the Municipality of Tolmin in the Littoral region of Slovenia.

== Name ==
The name of the settlement was changed from Slap to Slap ob Idrijci in 1955.

== Notable people ==
Notable people that were born or lived in Slap ob Idrijci include:

- Ciril Kosmač (1910–1980), writer

== Gallery ==
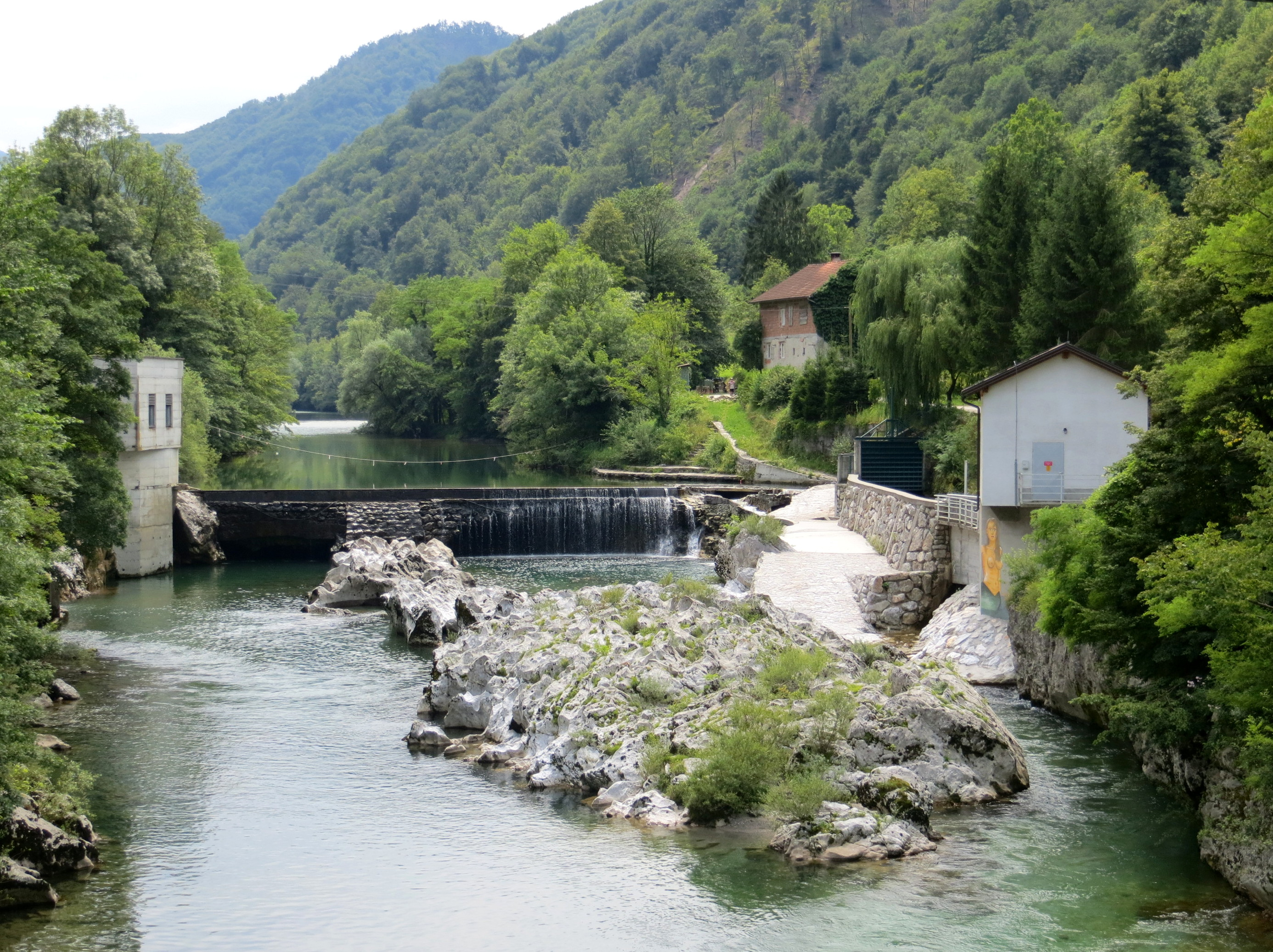
Falls on the Idrijca River in Slap ob Idrijci

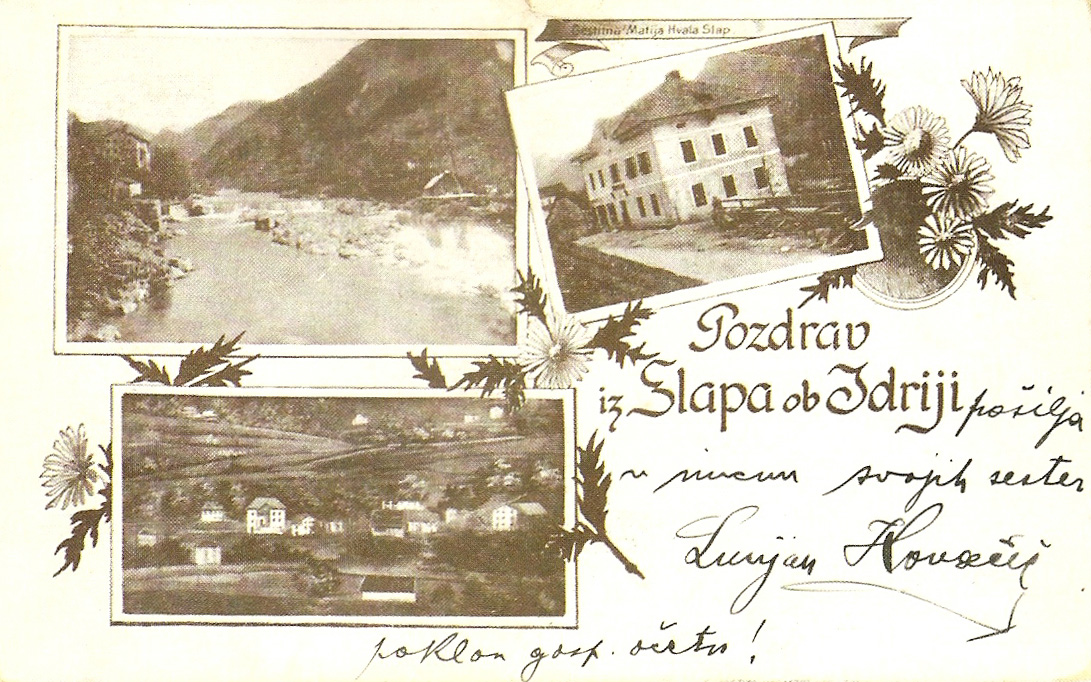
1899 postcard of Slap ob Idrijci

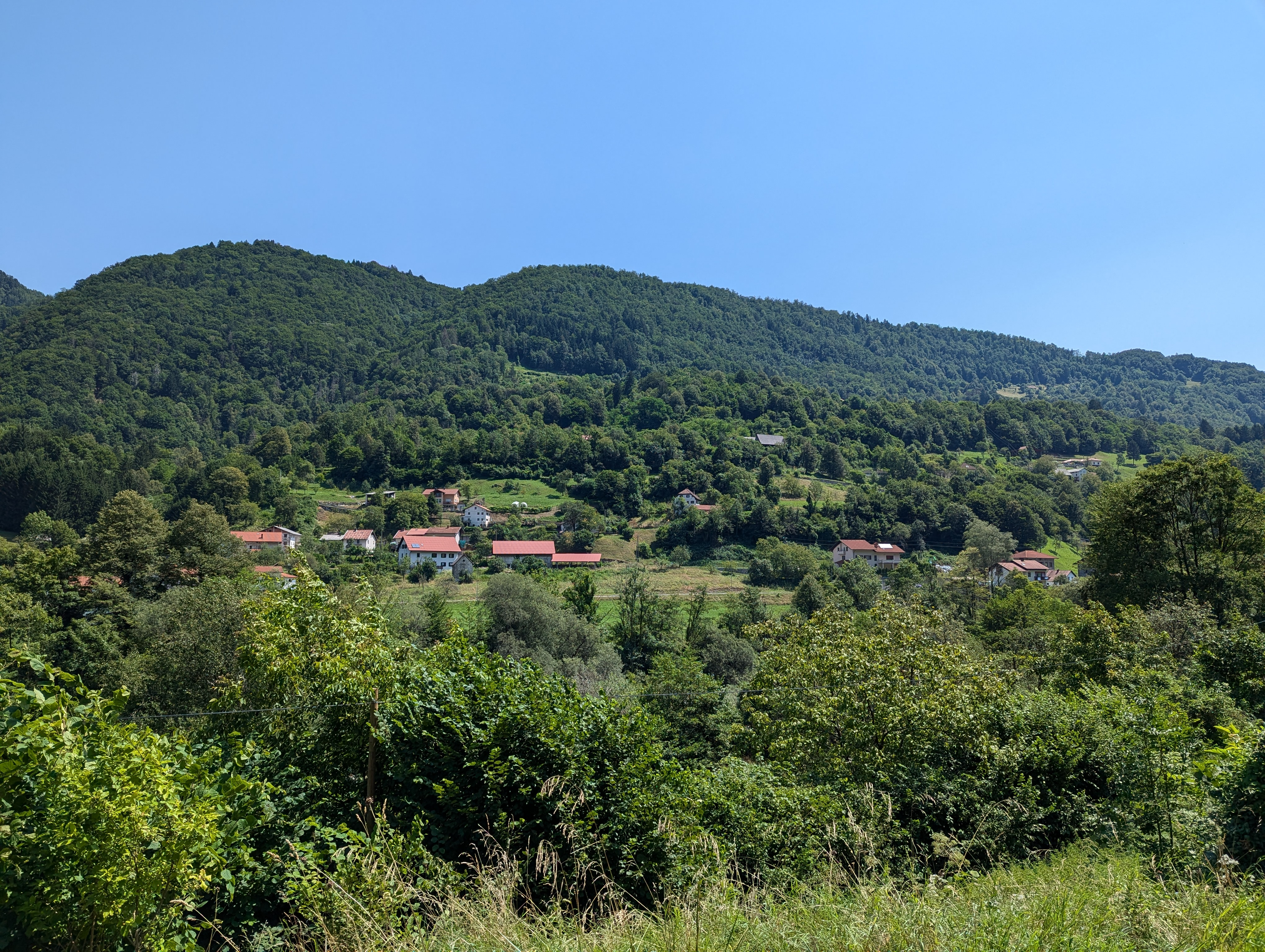
View of Slap ob Idrijci from across the Idrijca River
