= Žabče =

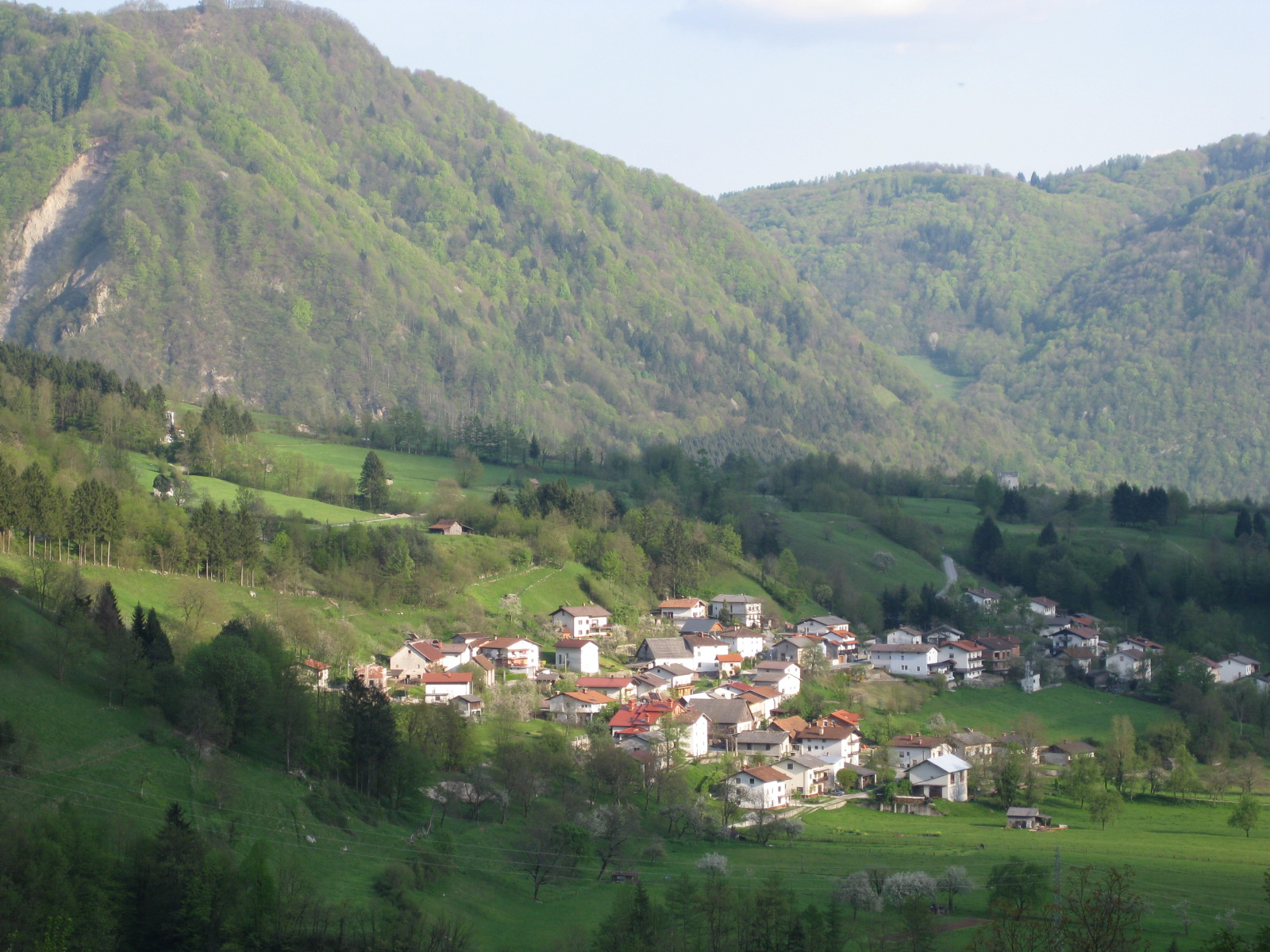

- Location in Slovenia
- Coordinates: 46°11′17.41″N 13°44′30.64″E
- Country: Slovenia
- Traditional region: Slovenian Littoral
- Statistical region: Gorizia
- Municipality: Tolmin

Area
  - Total: 2.04 km^{2} (0.79 sq mi)
- Elevation: 228.2 m (749 ft)

Population (2002)
  - Total: 180

Žabče (pronounced [ˈʒaːptʃɛ]) is a village northeast of Tolmin in the Littoral region of Slovenia.

The local church, built to the east of the settlement, is dedicated to Saint Mark and belongs to the Parish of Tolmin.
