= Bukovski Vrh =

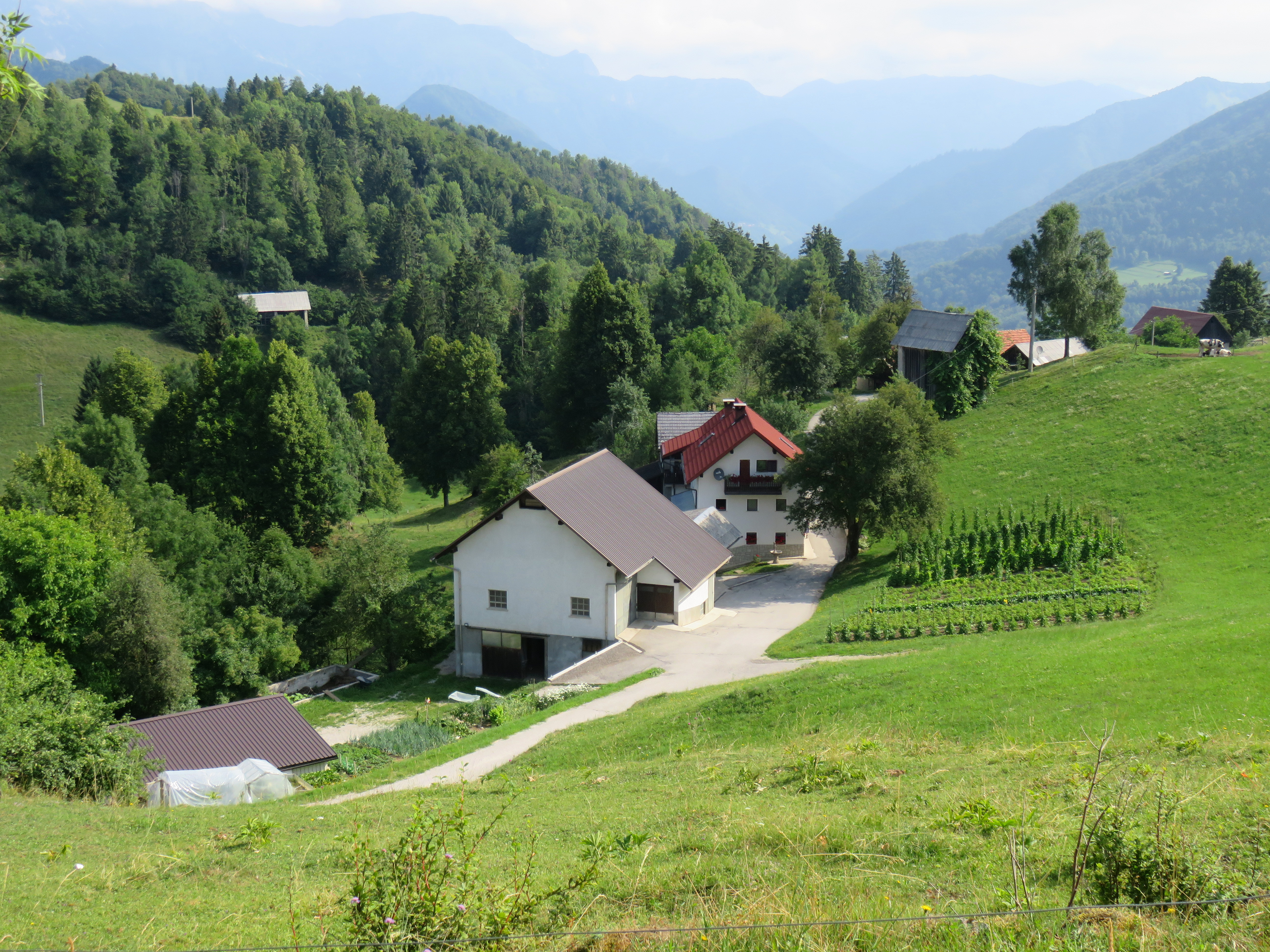
- The hamlet of Doline in Bukovski Vrh

- Location in Slovenia
- Coordinates: 46°8′34.83″N 13°52′55.24″E
- Country: Slovenia
- Traditional region: Slovenian Littoral
- Statistical region: Gorizia
- Municipality: Tolmin

Area
  - Total: 2.14 km^{2} (0.83 sq mi)
- Elevation: 830.2 m (2,724 ft)

Population (2002)
  - Total: 28

Bukovski Vrh (pronounced [buˈkoːu̯ski ˈʋəɾx], formerly Vrh Bukovo, locally Vrh) is a small settlement above Bukovo in the Littoral region of Slovenia. It lies on a plateau high above the Bača Valley in the Municipality of Tolmin.

== Geography ==
Bukovski Vrh is a scattered settlement northeast, east, and southeast of Črv Peak (Slovene: Črvov vrh, 974 meters or 3,196 feet), the highest point on the Šentviška Gora Plateau. It includes the hamlets and isolated farms of Doline, Lipeta (a.k.a. Pri Bajtah), Pirc, Pušnik, Seljak, Svinače, and Velikonja. The surrounding area falls steeply to the north toward the Bača Gorge (Slovene: Baška grapa), and to the northeast transitions to the Bukovo Pass (Slovene: Bukovski preval). It is a largely wooded area transitioning to a karst landscape. There are tilled fields in cleared areas. There are a few small springs in the area; Zakukar Spring (Slovene: Zakukarjev studenec) has been walled in to provide water for the former dairy and school in the hamlet of Svinače.

== History ==
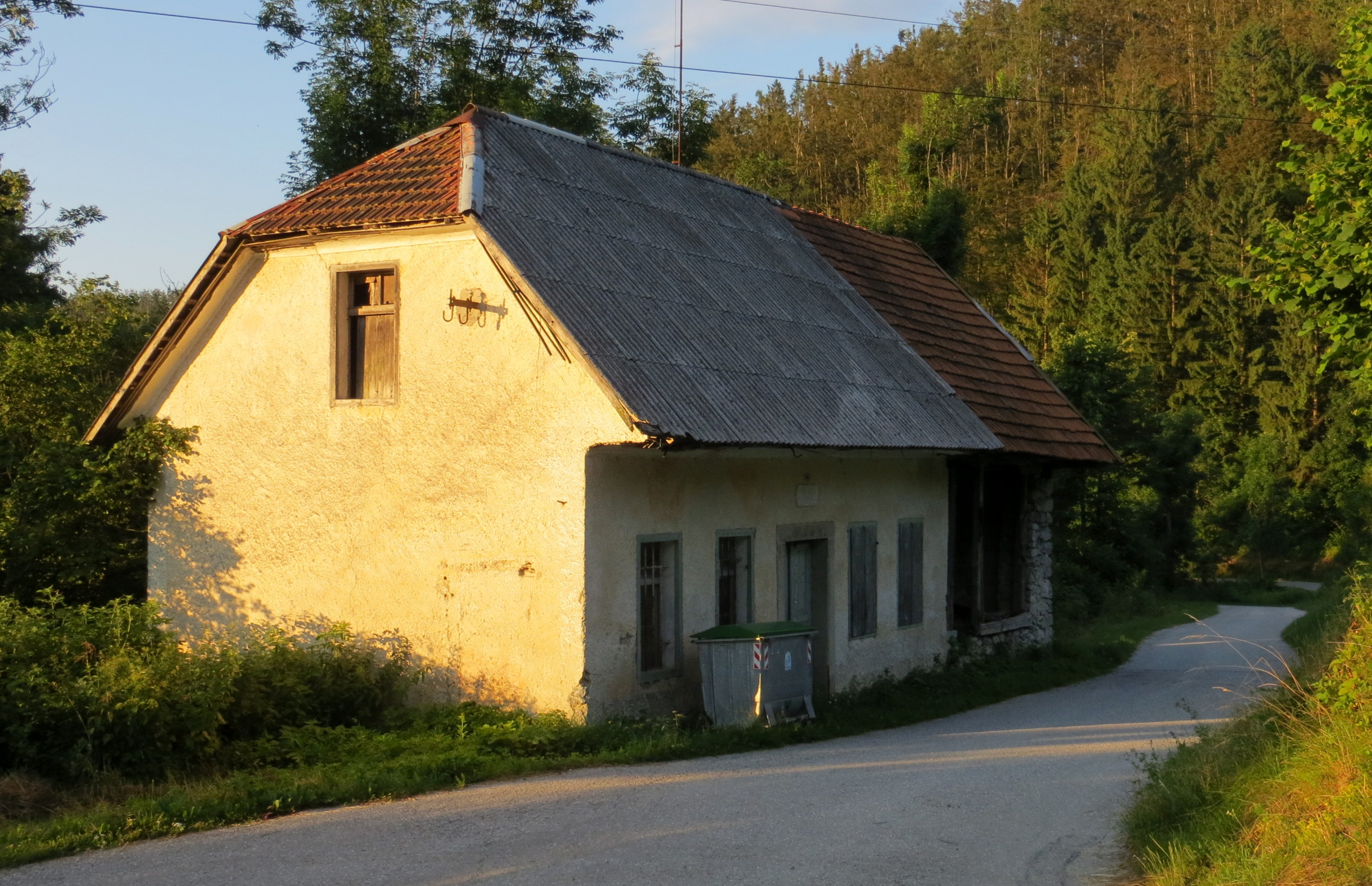
Former village school

The village formerly had a much larger population, numbering 120 people in 20 houses in 1910. The population fell due to out-migration, especially after 1954, due to the village's difficult access. After the snow emergency of February 1952, many chamois relocated to the area from the Lower Bohinj Mountains. A dairy facility formerly operated in Bukovski Vrh, but it was abandoned in 1960. The school in the village closed in 1974.
