= Podmelec =

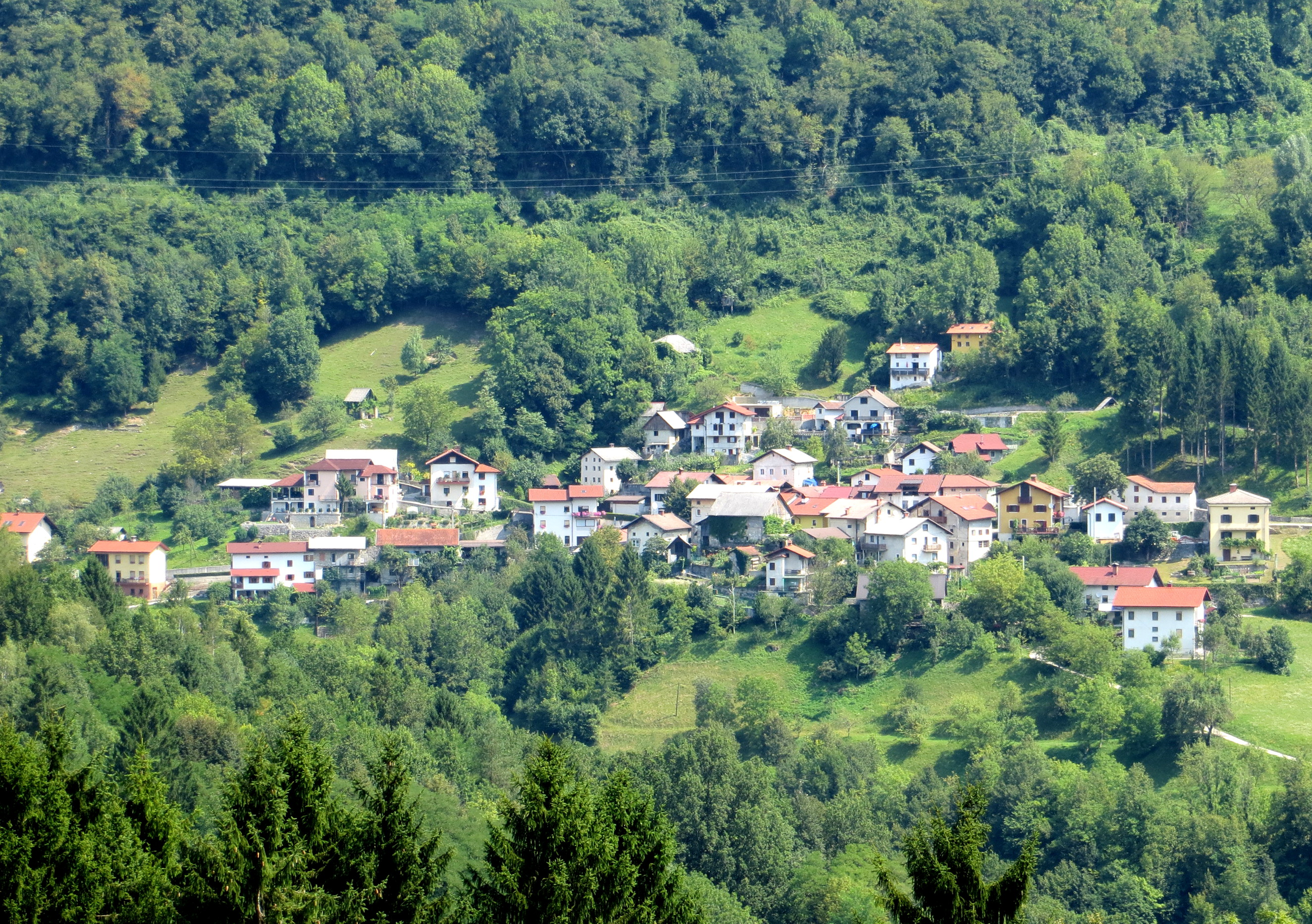

- Location in Slovenia
- Coordinates: 46°9′52.22″N 13°48′35.88″E
- Country: Slovenia
- Traditional region: Slovenian Littoral
- Statistical region: Gorizia
- Municipality: Tolmin

Area
  - Total: 3.4 km^{2} (1.3 sq mi)
- Elevation: 298.3 m (979 ft)

Population (2002)
  - Total: 96

Podmelec (pronounced [pɔdˈmeːləts]) is a village west of Kneža in the Bača Valley in the Municipality of Tolmin in the Littoral region of Slovenia.

== Geography ==
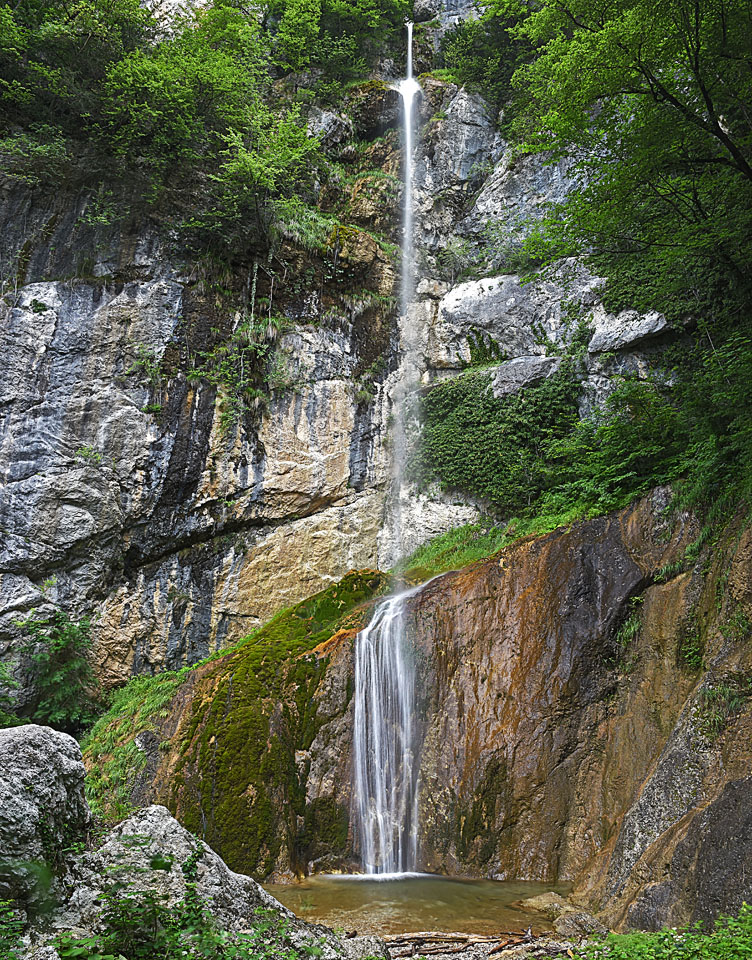
Sopota Falls

Podmelec stands on a slope above the right bank of the Bača River. Sopota Falls (Slovene: slap Sopota) is located about 500 meters (1,600 ft) northwest of the village center on Sopota Creek, a tributary of the Bača River.

== Church ==
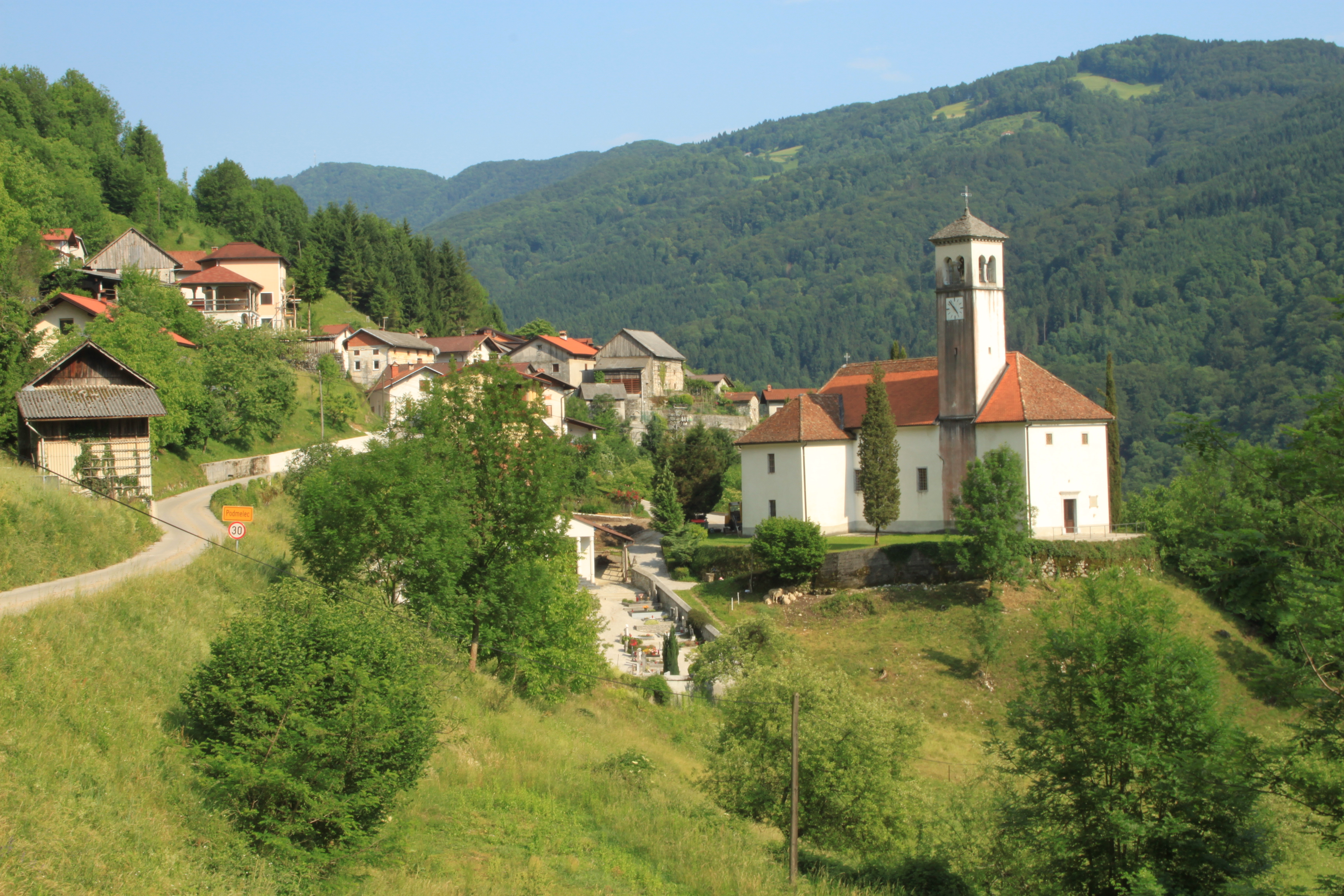
Assumption Church

The parish church in the settlement is dedicated to the Assumption of Mary and belongs to the Koper Diocese.
