= Osojnica =

Osojnica may refer to:

- Osojnica, Slovenia, a village near Žiri
- Osojnica, Doboj, a village in Bosnia and Herzegovina
- Osojnica, Zenica, a village near Zenica, Bosnia and Herzegovina
- Osojnica, the Slovene name of Zwanzgerberg, a village near Ebenthal in Kärnten, Austria
- Osojnica, a river tributary to Bregalnica, in North Macedonia
- Osojnica, a hill near Bled, Slovenia
- Osojnica, a hill near Zatolmin, Slovenia
- Osojnica, a ridge near Avče, Slovenia

== See also ==
- Osojnik
