= Anton Podbevšek =

Slovenian poet

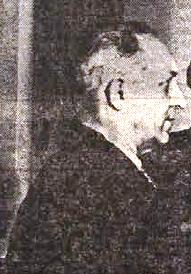
- Born: June 13, 1898; Grm Manor, Kandija, Duchy of Carniola, Cisleithania, Austria-Hungary
- Died: November 14, 1981 (aged 83); Ljubljana, SR Slovenia, SFR Yugoslavia
- Occupation(s): Linguist, poet, essayist, writer, translator

Anton Podbevšek (13 June 1898 – 14 November 1981) was a Slovenian avant-garde poet. He was an important influence to the poet Srečko Kosovel. He was one of the participants of the artistic activity known as the Novo Mesto Spring (Novomeška pomlad) in 1920, which marked the beginning of Slovenian modernism. The poet Miran Jarc portrayed him in the semi-autobiographical novel Novo mesto in the character of Andrej Vrezec.

== Biography ==
Podbevšek was born at Grm manor near the Lower Carniolan village of Kandija, today part of the town of Novo Mesto. The region was then part of the Duchy of Carniola in the Austro-Hungarian Empire, and is now in Slovenia. The manor was owned by a noble family of Czech origin who had donated it to the Carniolan Agricultural Association, which ran an agricultural school in the building. Anton Podbevšek's father, who originally came from Upper Carniola, worked in the school as a janitor, and the family lived in the manor until 1911.

Between 1909 and 1917, Podbevšek attended the Novo Mesto Grammar School, where he was a schoolmate of the poet Miran Jarc and the gymnast Leon Štukelj. During his school years, he also established a friendship with the painter Božidar Jakac, author Fran Albreht, and composer Marij Kogoj, who lived and studied in Novo Mesto. Podbevšek started writing poetry in high school: he was initially influenced by the aesthetic modernism of Oton Župančič, but soon fell under the influence of avant-garde movements, especially Italian ones. He first attempted to enter literature with the poem cycle Žolta pisma (Yellow Letters), which he wrote at age 16. This work shows that he was initially influenced by Italian Futurism. In 1917, he was drafted into the Austro-Hungarian Army and sent to the Italian front. He was wounded and spent the last months of the war in a military hospital in Tolmezzo in Friuli. Upon his return, he re-established the contact with his artist friends from Novo Mesto with the intention to establish an avant-garde artistic community, based on the idea of Gesamtkunstwerk: a total work of art that would incorporate literature, music and visual arts.

In 1920, he helped organize a modernist artistic event known as the Novo Mesto Spring (Novomeška pomlad), together with the composer Marij Kogoj, poet Miran Jarc, and painter Božidar Jakac. He went on to become a founder of the journal Trije labodje (Three Swans), but later broke with its co-editor Josip Vidmar: Podbevšek wanted a more revolutionary and socialist orientation of the journal, while Vidmar rejected political activism and avant-garde orientations in the name of the classicist notion of "pure art." This led Podbevšek to leave the Trije labodje circle and to create Rdeči pilot (The Red Pilot), which only lasted for two issues. In the journal, he also published the essay "Political Art" (Politična umetnost), which was one of the first avant-garde manifestos in Slovene. In 1925, he published his only collection of poems, Človek z bombami ("Man with Bombs").

After the 1920s, he became less active, but in 1939 he made notable translations of Walt Whitman to celebrate the poet's 120th birthday. In the mid-1960s, he became active again, influenced by the emergence of new Slovene avant-gardism (especially the OHO group, and the poetry of Tomaž Šalamun). However, his intention of republishing the Man with Bombs was never realized.

== Work ==
Anton Podbevšek was the beginner and main representative of the first, radical phase of the Slovenian historical avant-gardes. He deviated from the established poetic forms: in his poems, he used free verse, a nominal or telegraphic style and unusual imagery. He gradually moved from relatively simple poems to longer, graphical hymns in lyrical prose. The themes of his poetry were existential experiences, war, as well as romantic themes.

His poems are characterized by the so-called titanic lyric subject, resulting from the neo-romantic lyrical subject, with the features of Nietzschean superman and Whitman's pantheism. In addition, many poems reveal a strong expressionist influence. Podbevšek's initial enthusiasm for futurism was later attenuated: what remained from the futurist influences was the celebration of art and some stylistical elements, but even those can actually be attributed to the emerging expressionism. Differently from the futurists, Podbevšek had a highly ambivalent attitude to the war.

== Legacy ==
Podbevšek's work was highly influential for the Slovene constructivists, who mostly came from the Slovenian Littoral (including Trieste and Gorizia): particularly the poet Srečko Kosovel, but also the painters Avgust Černigoj and Ivan Čargo, and theater director Ferdo Delak, who later consciously distanced themselves from Podbevšek.

In the 1960s, the Slovenian neo-avant-garde re-discovered Podbevšek's work, although few of them were directly influenced by him.

In 2006 the Anton Podbevšek Theater was founded in Novo Mesto and named after him.
