= Kandija, Novo Mesto =

Kandija
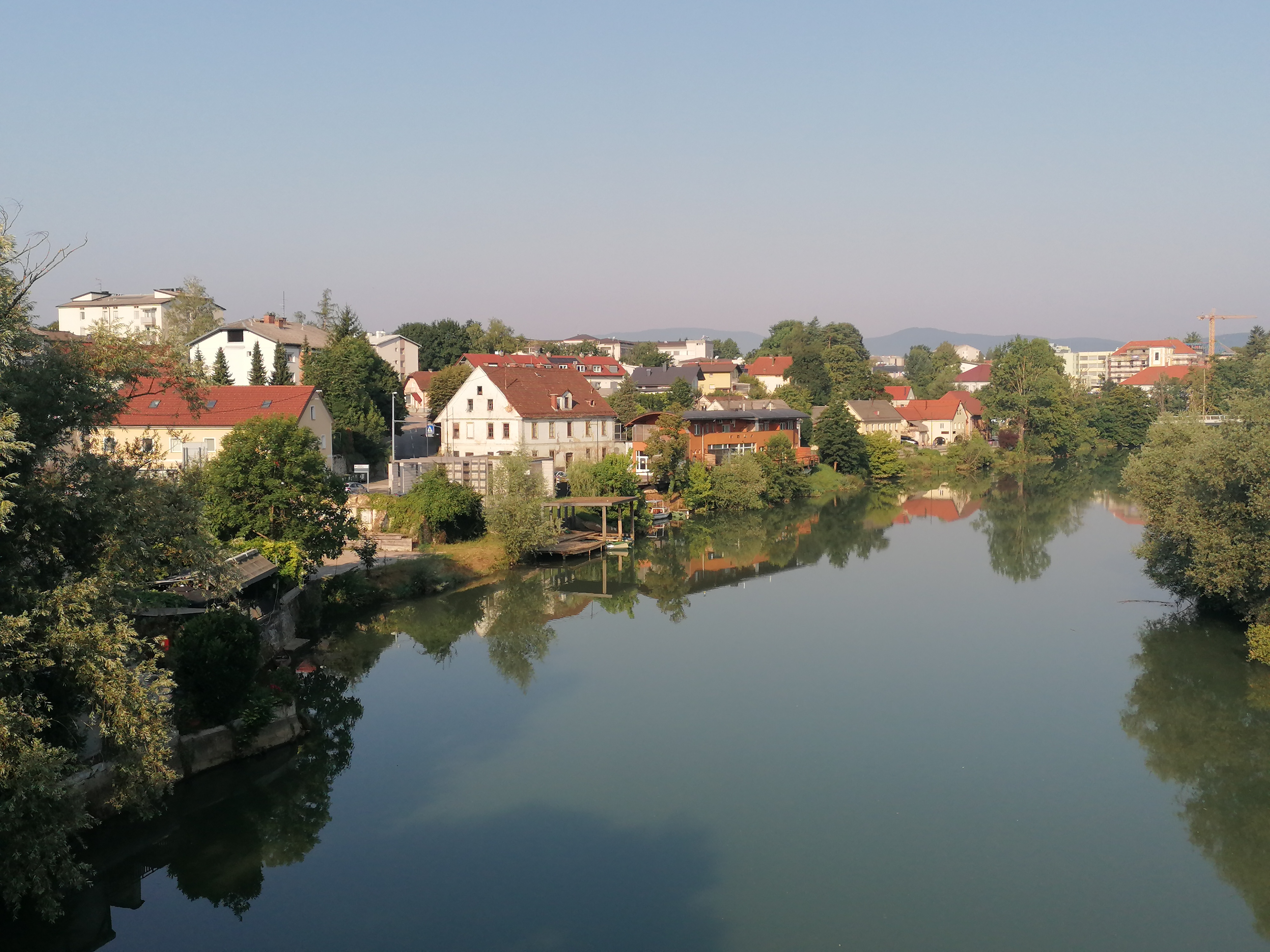

- Location in Slovenia
- Coordinates: 45°48′04″N 15°10′16″E
- Country: Slovenia
- Traditional region: Lower Carniola
- Statistical region: Southwest Slovenia
- Municipality: Novo Mesto
- Elevation: 175 m (574 ft)

Kandija (pronounced [ˈkaːndija], German: Kandia) is a former village in southeastern Slovenia in the Municipality of Novo Mesto, now part of the city of Novo Mesto. It is also part of the traditional region of Lower Carniola and is now included in the Southeast Slovenia Statistical Region.

== Geography ==
Kandija stands on the right bank of the Krka River, south of the town center of Novo Mesto, and connected to the town center by the Kandija Bridge. Heavy Creek (Slovene: Težka voda) flows west of the historical center of Kandija and discharges into the Krka River.

== Name ==
The name Kandija is borrowed from the Italian Candia 'Crete'. The name originates from the mid-17th century, when there was a military collection center in Kandija to send recruits to fight in the Cretan War.

== History ==
Kandija had a population of 590 in 61 houses in 1900. Kandija was annexed by the city of Novo Mesto in 1923, ending its existence as an independent settlement.

== Notable people ==
Notable people that were born, lived, or died in Kandija include the following:

- Anton Podbevšek (1898–1981), avant-garde poet
- Julija Primic (1816–1864), muse of the poet France Prešeren
- Leon Štukelj (1898–1999), gymnast and Olympic gold medalist
