= Tolmin =

- Town
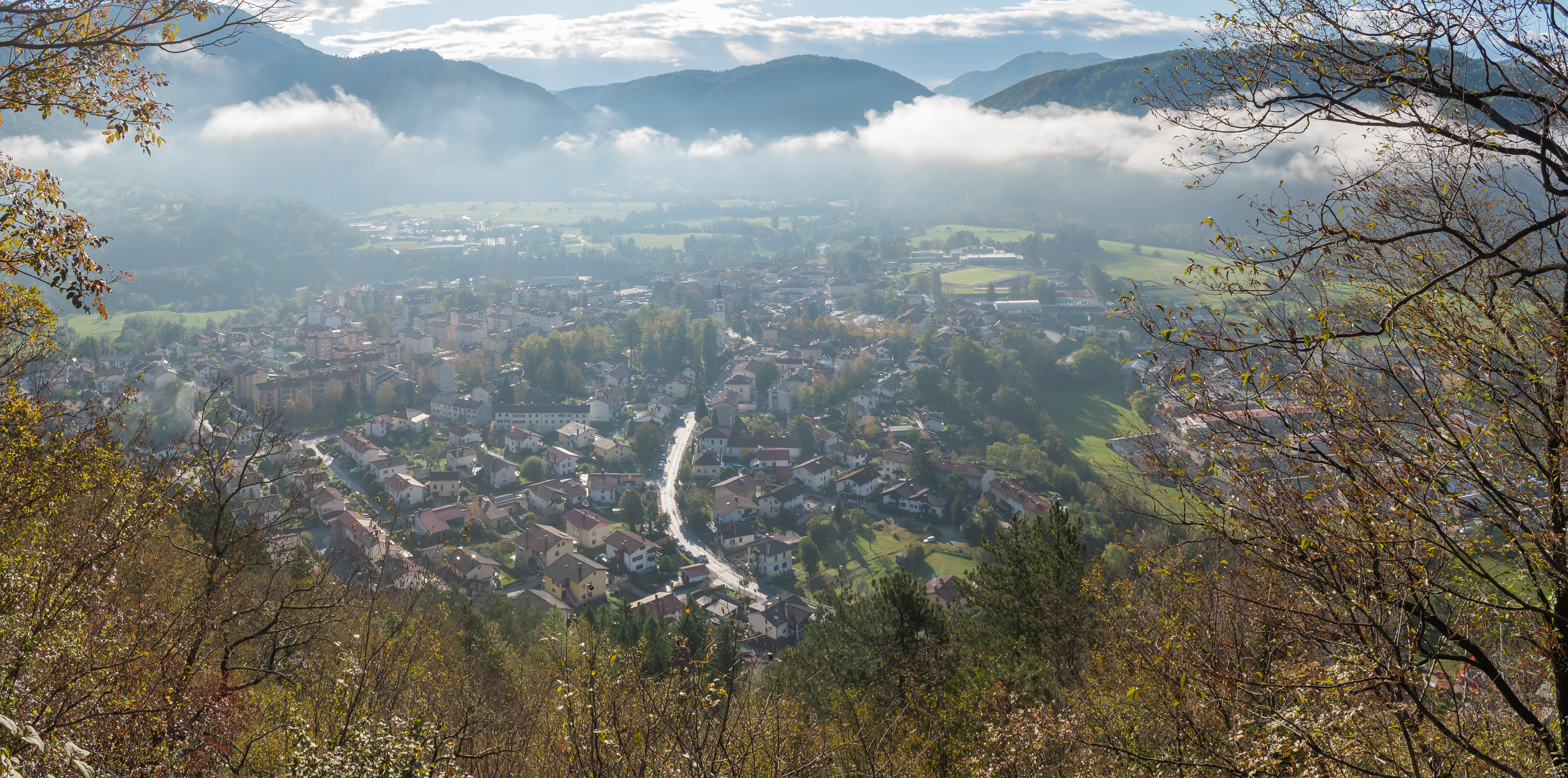
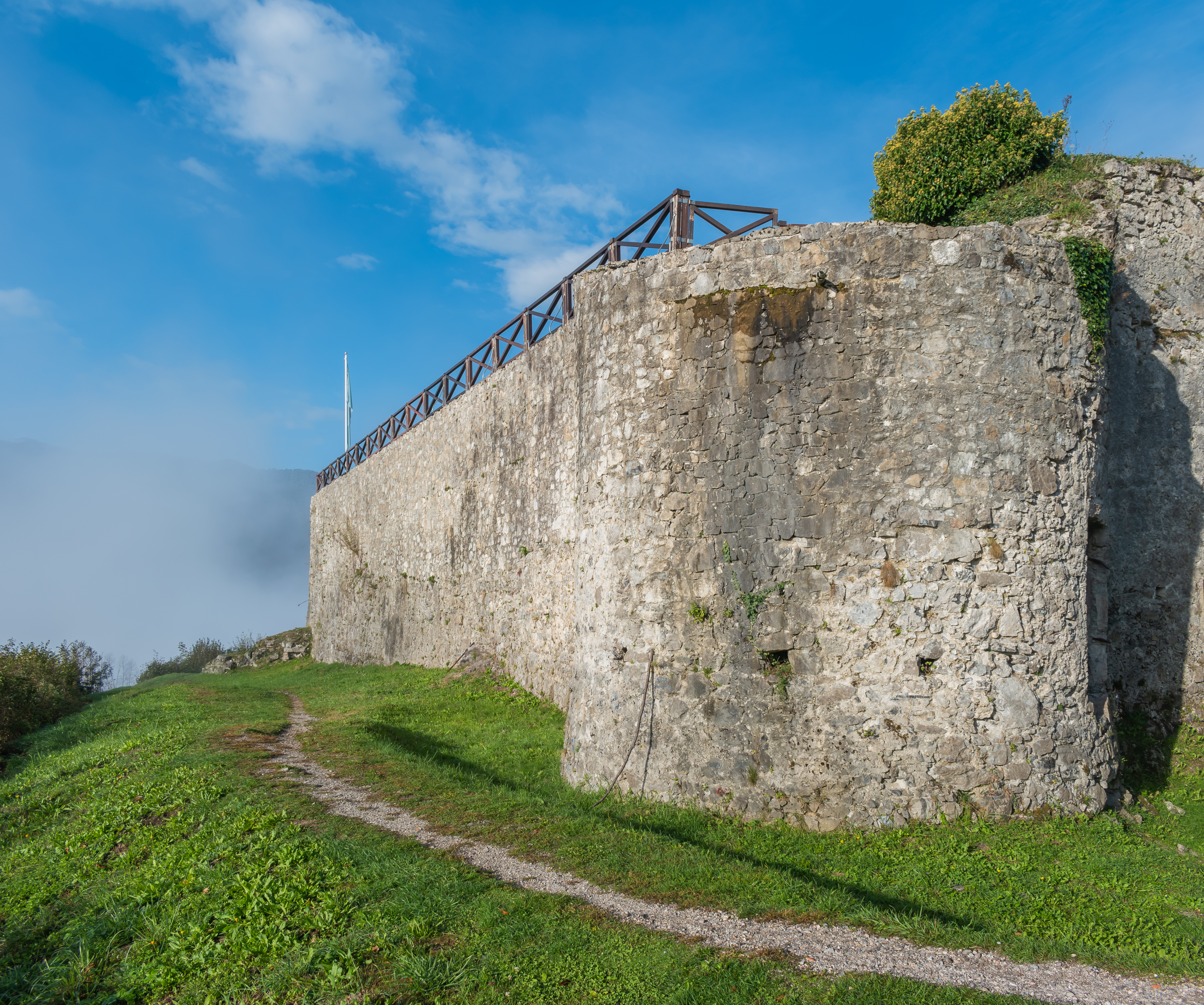
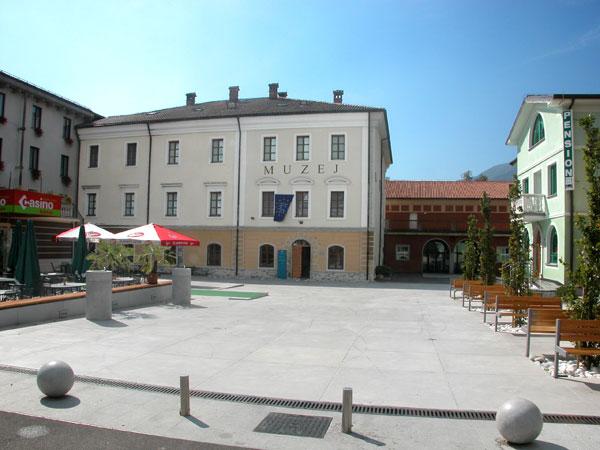
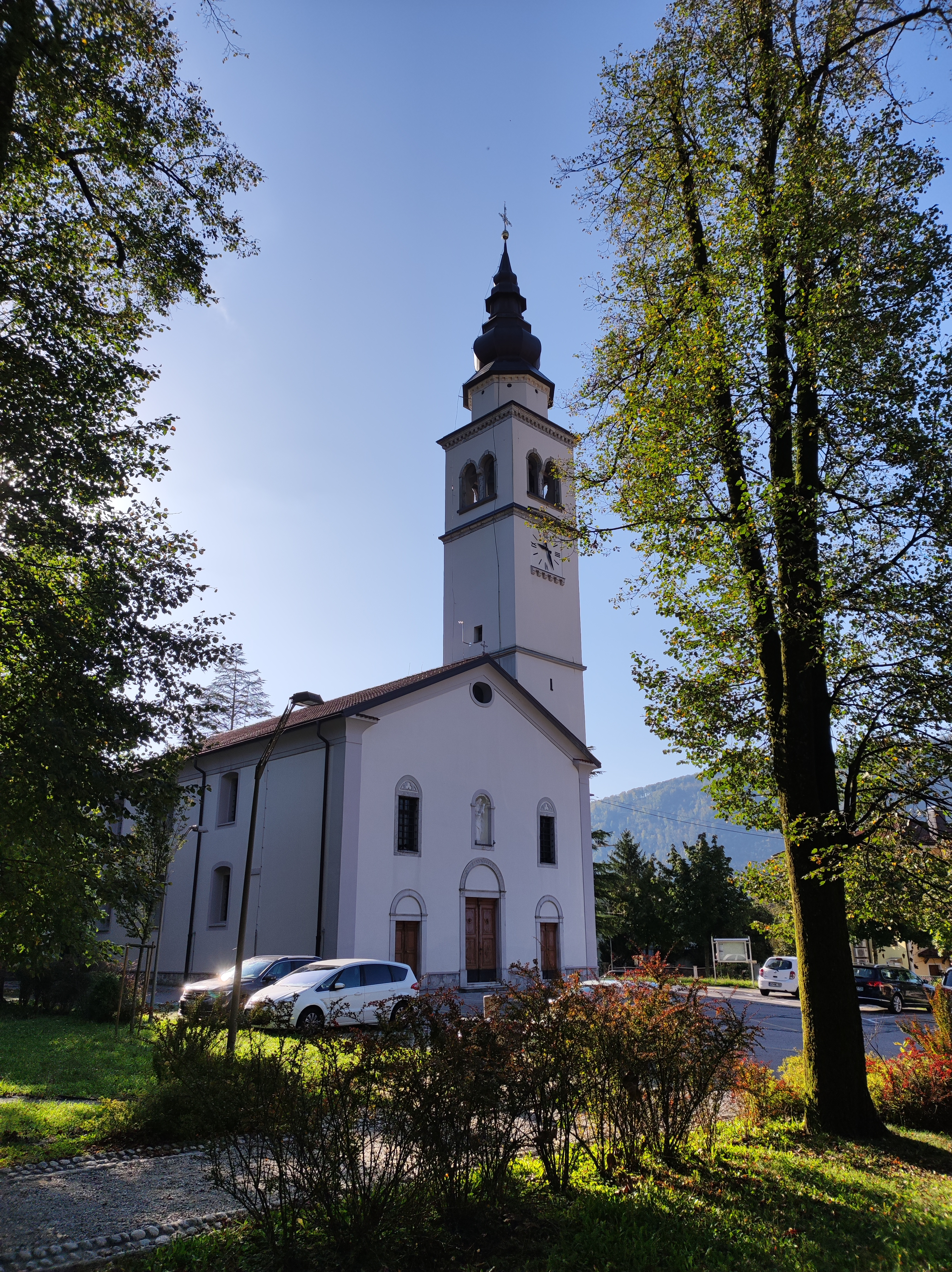
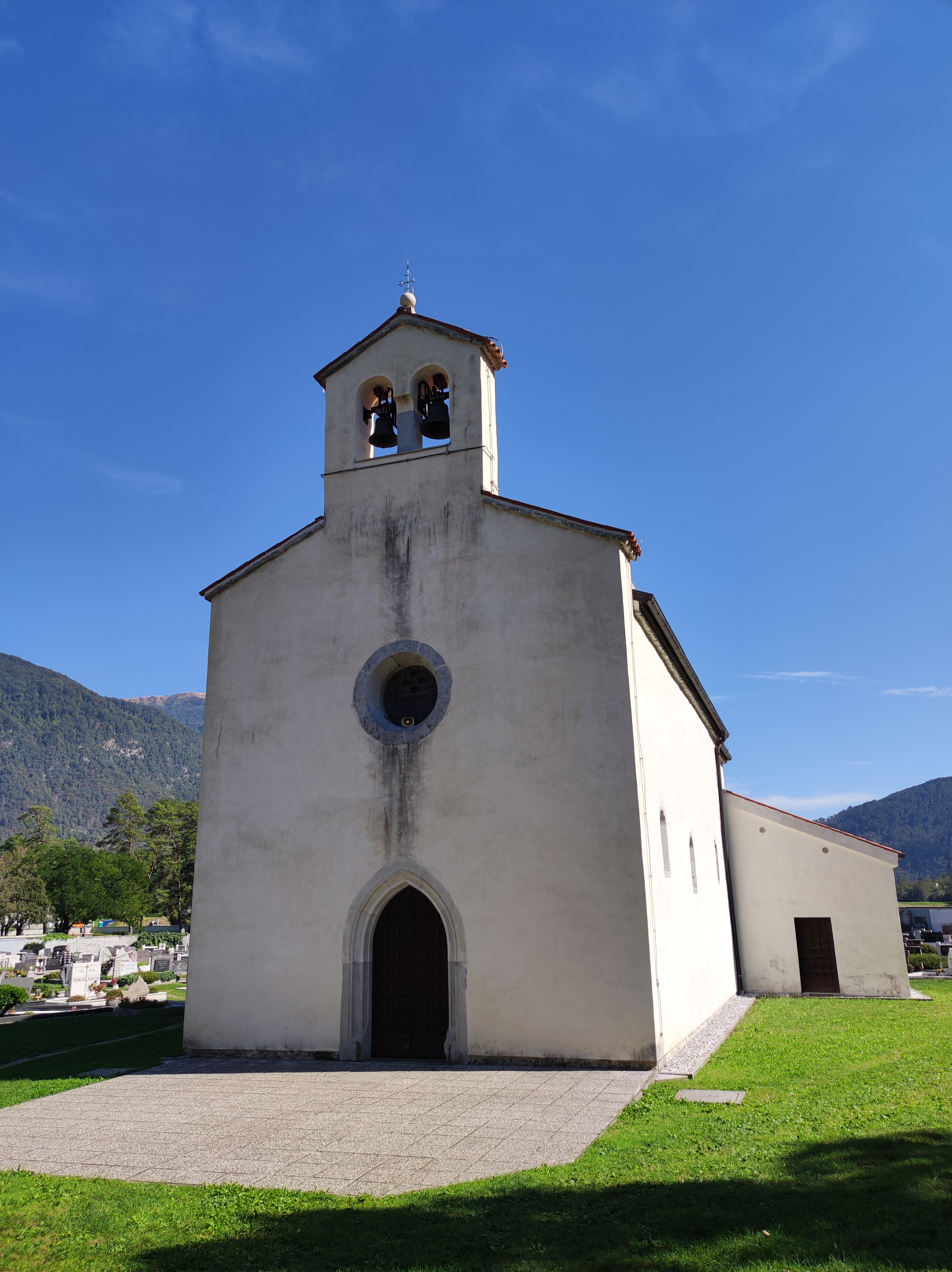
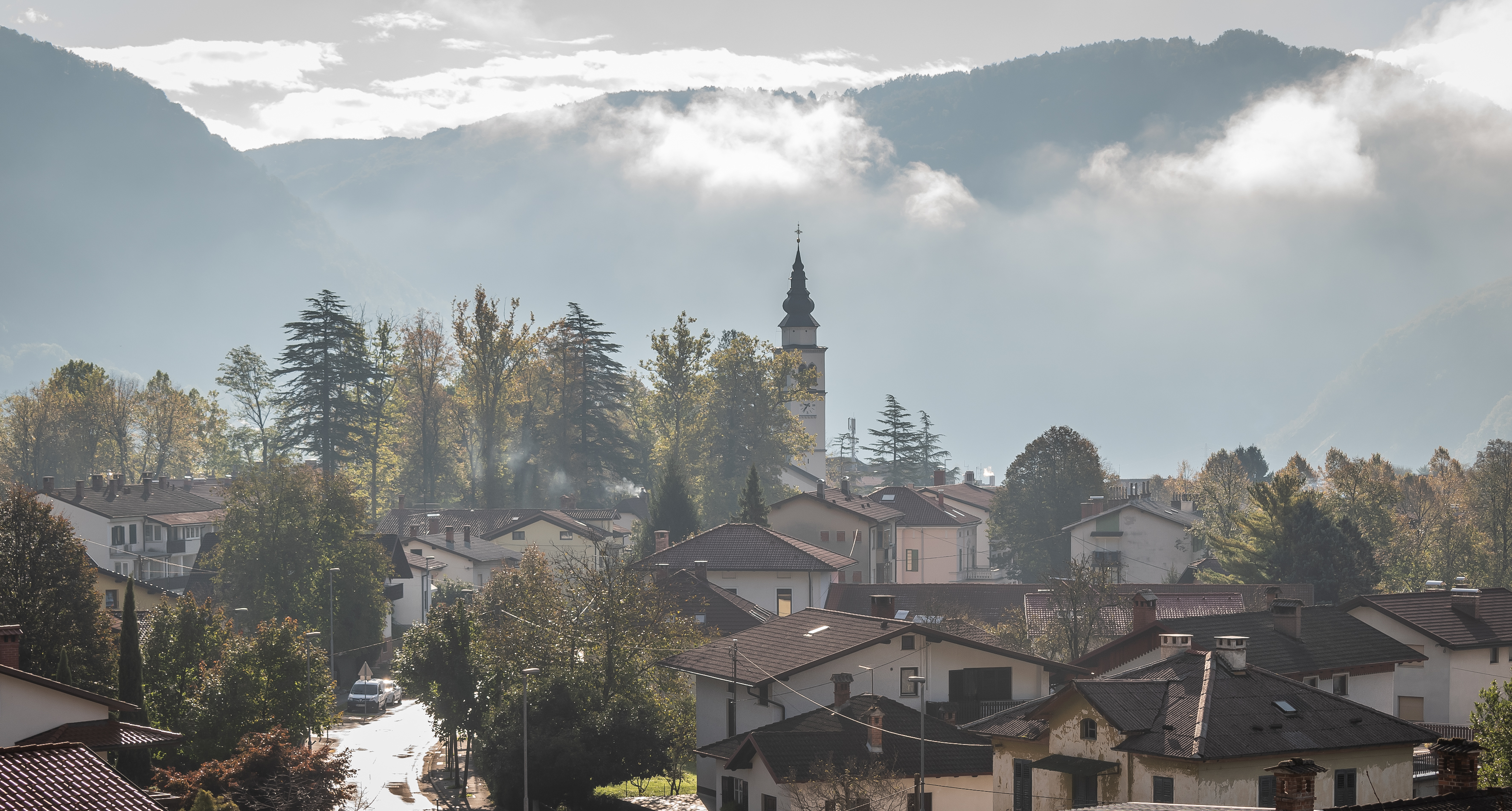
- From top, left to right: Tolmin from above, Tolmin Castle, Town square, Holy Mary's Church, St. Ulrich's Church, Tolmin overview

- Flag Coat of arms

- Location of the town of Tolmin in Slovenia
- Coordinates: 46°11′8.69″N 13°44′6.54″E
- Country: Slovenia
- Traditional region: Slovenian Littoral
- Statistical region: Gorizia
- Municipality: Tolmin

Government
  - Mayor: Alen Červ

Area
  - Total: 1.7 km^{2} (0.66 sq mi)

Population (2012)
  - Total: 3,525
  - Density: 1,284/km^{2} (3,330/sq mi)
- Time zone: UTC+01 (CET)
  - Summer (DST): UTC+02 (CEST)
- Vehicle registration: GO
- Climate: Cfb
- Website: www.tolmin.si

Tolmin (pronounced [tɔlˈmíːn]; Italian: Tolmino, German Tolmein) is a small town in northwestern Slovenia. It is the administrative centre of the Municipality of Tolmin.

== Geography ==
Tolmin stands on the southern rim of the Julian Alps and is the largest settlement in the Upper Soča Valley (Slovene: Zgornje Posočje), close to the border with Italy. It is located on a terrace above the confluence of the Soča and Tolminka rivers, positioned beneath steep mountainous valleys. The old town gave its name to the entire Tolmin area (Slovene: Tolminsko) as its economic, cultural and administrative centre.

The area is located in the historic Goriška region, itself part of the larger Slovene Littoral, about 41 km (25 mi) north of Nova Gorica and 87 km (54 mi) west of the Slovene capital Ljubljana. In the north, the road leads further up the Soča River to Bovec, with an eastern branch-off to Škofja Loka and Idrija.

== History ==
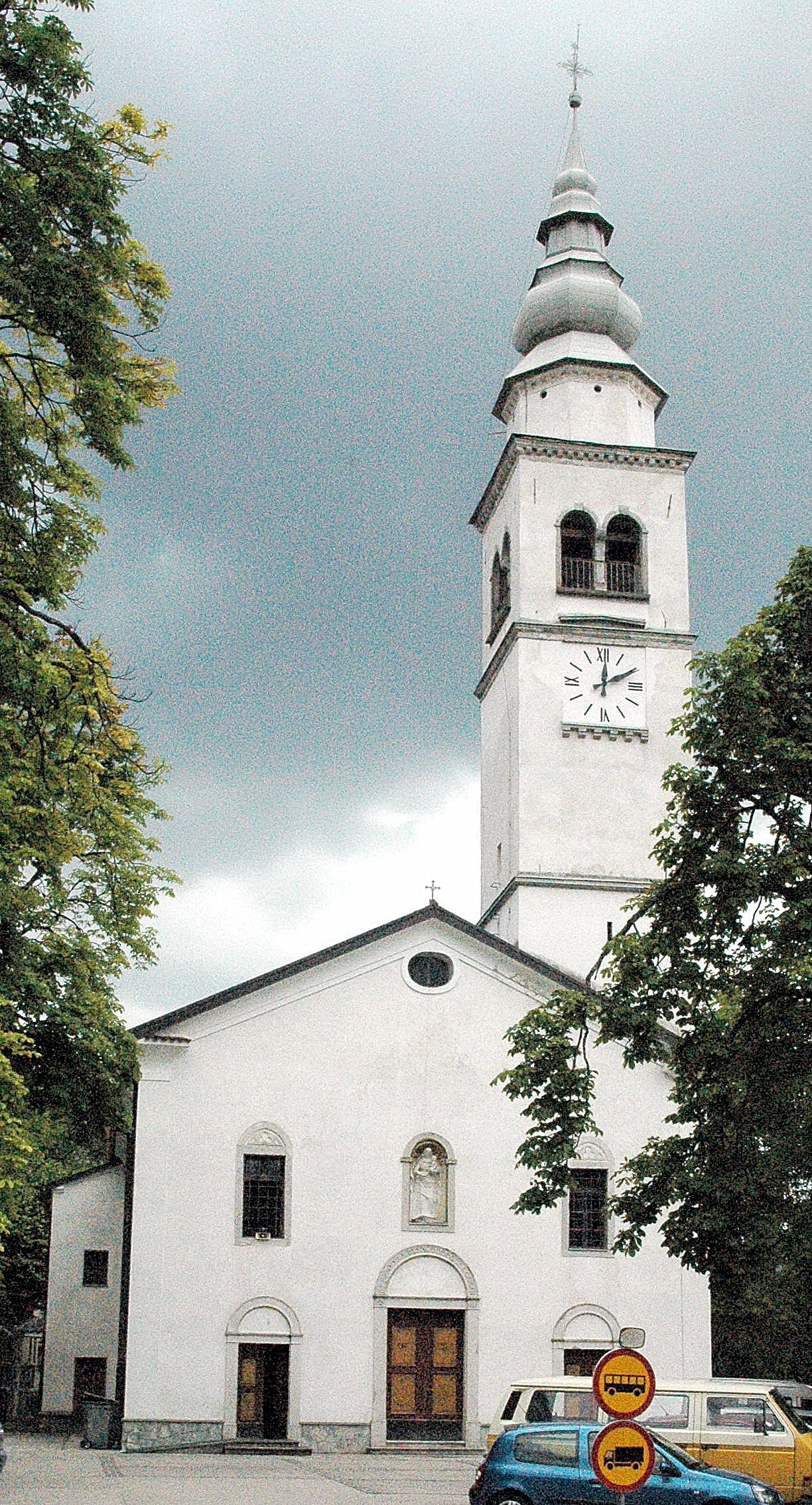
Assumption of Mary Parish Church

Early inhabitants were Illyrians in Tolmin area. It was ruled successively by the Roman Empire, Odoacer, the Ostrogoths, the Eastern Roman Empire and part of the Lombard Duchy of Friuli until it was conquered by the Frankish king Charlemagne in 774 and replaced by the Carolingian March of Friuli.

Ancestors of Slovenes had come to this area during the Slavic settlement of the Eastern Alps from about 600 onwards, embattled by Avar raids. It was passed to Middle Francia in 843 after the Treaty of Verdun and in 952 passed to the vast March of Verona, which was initially ruled by the Dukes of Bavaria, from 976 by the Carinthian dukes. King Henry IV of Germany ceded it to the newly established Patria del Friuli in 1077, before it was occupied by the Republic of Venice in 1420. Finally the Tolmin area was conquered by the Habsburg Emperor Maximilian I during the War of the League of Cambrai in 1509.

Tolmin was then ruled with the possessions of the extinct Counts of Gorizia as part of the Inner Austrian territories of the Habsburg monarchy. In 1713 it was the centre of a peasant revolt against increased taxation and the local Count Coronini. It was part of the Illyrian Provinces, which were part of Napoleonic French Empire between 1809 and 1814 before returning to Austrian rule. Until 1918, the town (under bilingual names Tolmein - Tolmin) was part of the Austro-Hungarian monarchy (Austrian side after the compromise of 1867) and head of the district of the same name, one of the 11 Bezirkshauptmannschaften in the Austrian Littoral province. A post-office was opened in October 1850 under the German name (only).

After World War I it was ruled by the Kingdom of Italy between 1918 and 1943 (nominally to 1947). It was a county (comune) center in Province of Gorizia between 1918 and 1923 and again between 1927 and 1943 (nominally to 1947) and in Province of Friuli between 1923 and 1927 during Italian rule as Tolmino. After the Italian capitulation, it was occupied by Nazi Germany in 1943 and was part of Operational Zone of the Adriatic Littoral before liberation by Yugoslav partisans. After temporary division of Julian March by Morgan Line, Tolmin was part of Zone-B, which was under Yugoslav administrators. It was officially passed from Italy to Yugoslavia in 1947 after the Treaty of Paris. Finally Tolmin was passed to Slovenia after breakup of Yugoslavia in 1991.

Historical population
Year	Pop.	±%
1948	1,320	—
1953	1,638	+24.1%
1961	1,965	+20.0%
1971	2,661	+35.4%
1981	3,978	+49.5%
1991	4,019	+1.0%
2002	3,737	−7.0%
2011	3,534	−5.4%
2021	3,274	−7.4%
Population size may be affected by changes in administrative divisions.

== Main sights ==
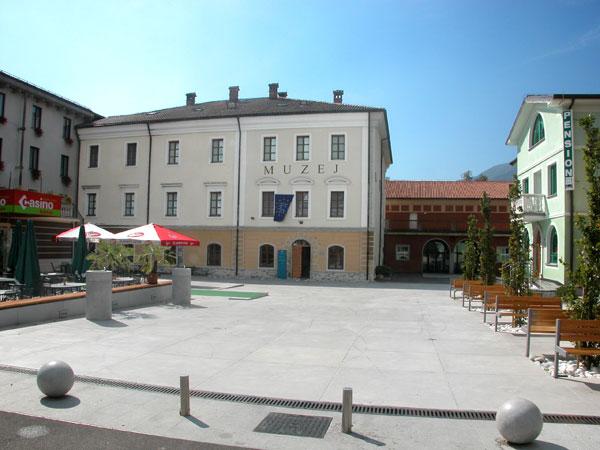
City square and museum

Tolmin's main sights are its old town centre, a modern sports park, and thousand-year-old castle ruins at the hill known as Kozlov rob.

The area is home to a multitude of vestiges from World War I. The most significant relic of the time is the Javorca Church, dedicated to the Holy Spirit built above the Polog shepherds outpost in the Tolminka Valley by Austro-Hungarian soldiers to commemorate their deceased comrades.

The museum, library, schools, and the town’s open spaces provide venues for a variety of events, exhibitions, and presentations all year round. The Tolmin region is also a popular destination for artists from Slovenia and abroad.

The parish church in the town is dedicated to the Assumption of Mary and belongs to the Diocese of Koper.

Tolmin is known for the Metaldays festival (formerly known as Metalcamp), which occurred from 2004 to 2022 in the town. Every year, it attracted about 10,000 people around Europe and other parts of world. Since 2023, after Metaldays moved from Tolmin to Velenje, a new festival, called Tolminator, was held in the same location as the prior festival. Other festivals that were held in Tolmin include Punk Rock Holiday and the Overjam reggae festival.

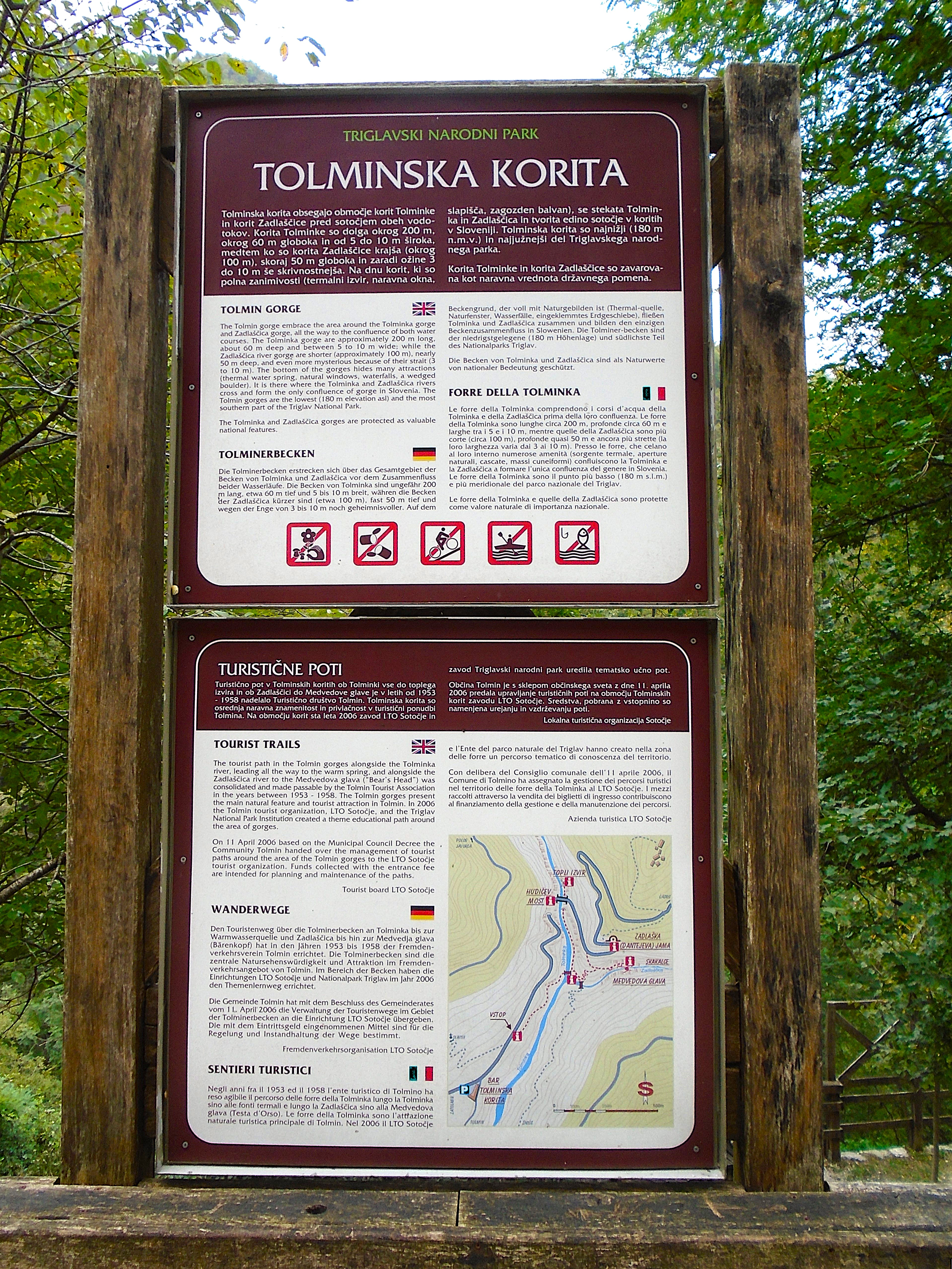
Tolmin Gorges information board near the town

The Tolmin Gorges (Slovene: Tolminska korita) are located north of Tolmin, in Zatolmin and Žabče, on the Tolminka River.

== Notable natives and residents ==
Notable natives and residents of Tolmin include:

- Andrea Bresciani (1923–2006), illustrator
- Pino Bosi (1933–2017), writer and historian
- Ivan Čargo (1898–1958), painter
- Jan Cvitkovič (born 1966), film director
- Anton Haus (1851–1917), grand admiral of the Austro-Hungarian Navy
- Ciril Kosmač (1910–1980), writer
- Karel Lavrič (1818–1876), politician
- Giancarlo Movia (born 1937), philosopher
- Ivan Pregelj (1883–1960), writer
- Albert Rejec (1899–1976), founder and head of TIGR
- Jožko Šavli (1943–2011), writer and historian
- Ljubka Šorli (1910–1993), poet, writer and teacher
- Saša Vuga (1930–2016), writer

== International Relation ==
=== Twin Town — Sister City ===
Tolmin is twinned with:

- Vicchio, Italy, since 1981
