= Congress Square =

Central square in Ljubljana, Slovenia

Coordinates: 46°03′01″N 14°30′13″E

UNESCO World Heritage Site
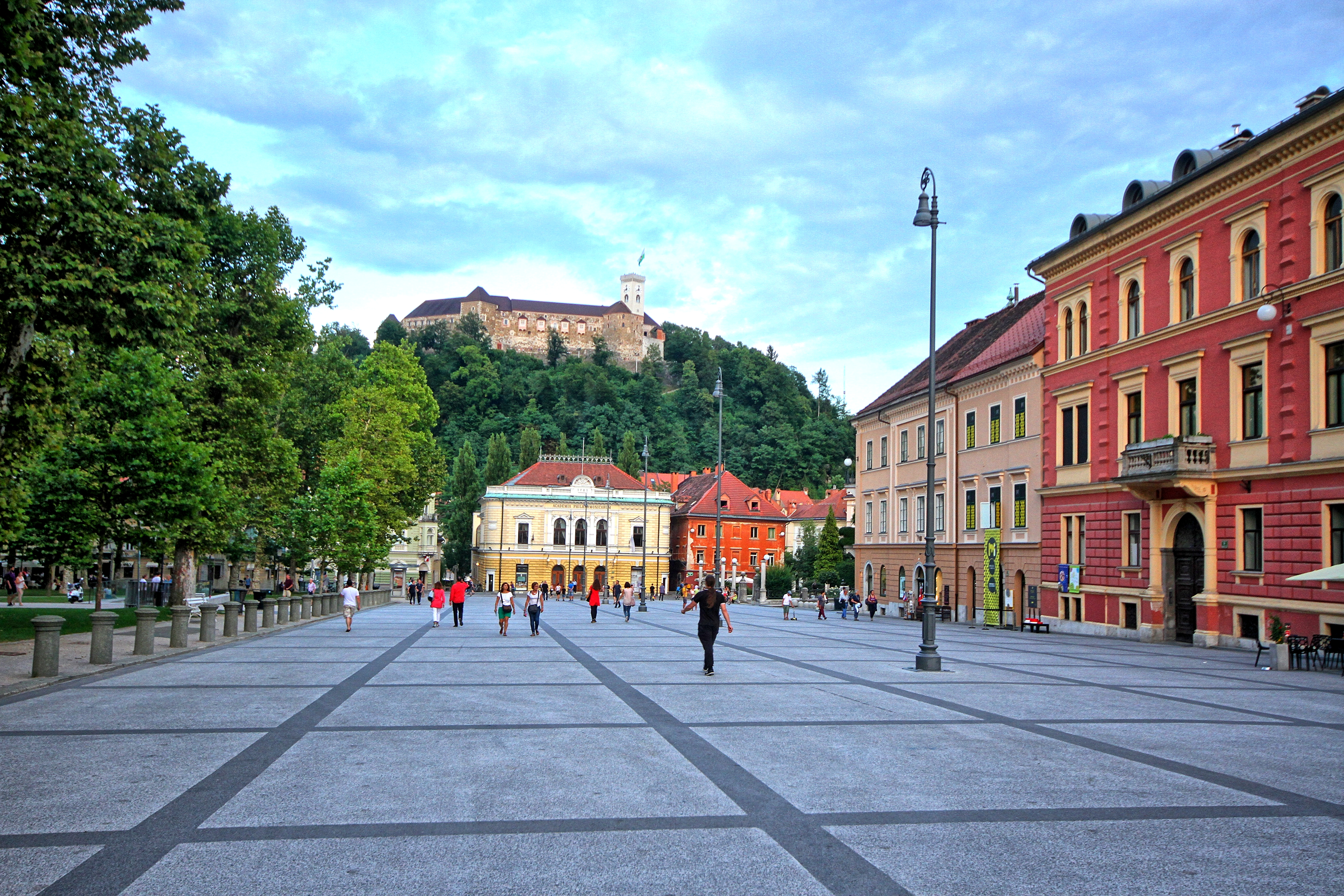
- View of Congress Square towards Ljubljana Castle
- Interactive map of Congress Square
- Location: Slovenia
- Part of: The works of Jože Plečnik in Ljubljana – Human Centred Urban Design
- Criteria: Cultural: (iv)
- Reference: 1643
- Inscription: 2021 (44th Session)

Congress Square (Slovene: Kongresni trg) is one of the central squares in Ljubljana, the capital of Slovenia. In the late 1930s, the square was renovated by the prominent Slovene architect Jože Plečnik. Since August 2021, it has been inscribed as part of Plečnik's legacy on the UNESCO World Heritage List.

== History ==
The square was built in 1821 at the site of the ruins of a medieval Capuchin monastery, which had been abolished during the reign of Habsburg Emperor Joseph II. The square was used for ceremonial purposes during the post-Napoleonic Congress of Ljubljana, after which it was named. After the congress, a park was laid out in the center of the square, which soon acquired the name Star Park (Slovene: Park Zvezda, German: Sternallee) due to its layout. During the communist period it was renamed Revolution Square (Slovene: Trg revolucije) and a few years later Liberation Square (Slovene: Trg osvoboditve), but the local population continued to use the old name. In 1990, it regained its original name.

The square has had a highly symbolic role in modern Slovenian history. On October 29, 1918, independence from Austrian-Hungarian rule and the establishment of the State of Slovenes, Croats and Serbs was proclaimed during a mass demonstration on the square. In May 1945, the Yugoslav Communist leader Josip Broz Tito first visited Slovenia after World War II and held a speech on the balcony of the University of Ljubljana, which faces the square.

On June 22, 1988, the first free mass demonstration was held on the square demanding the release of four Slovene journalists imprisoned by the Yugoslav army. The demonstration marked the beginning of the Slovenian spring which culminated in the declaration of Slovenia's independence on June 25, 1991. Independence was first demanded in the May Declaration, written by the Slovenian democratic opposition and signed by numerous civil society movements; the declaration was first publicly read by the poet Tone Pavček in a demonstration on Congress Square on May 8, 1989. In 1999 Bill Clinton became the first U.S. president to visit Slovenia. On June 21, he publicly addressed the crowd gathered on Congress Square, quoting the opening verses of the Slovenian national anthem.

=== Gallery ===
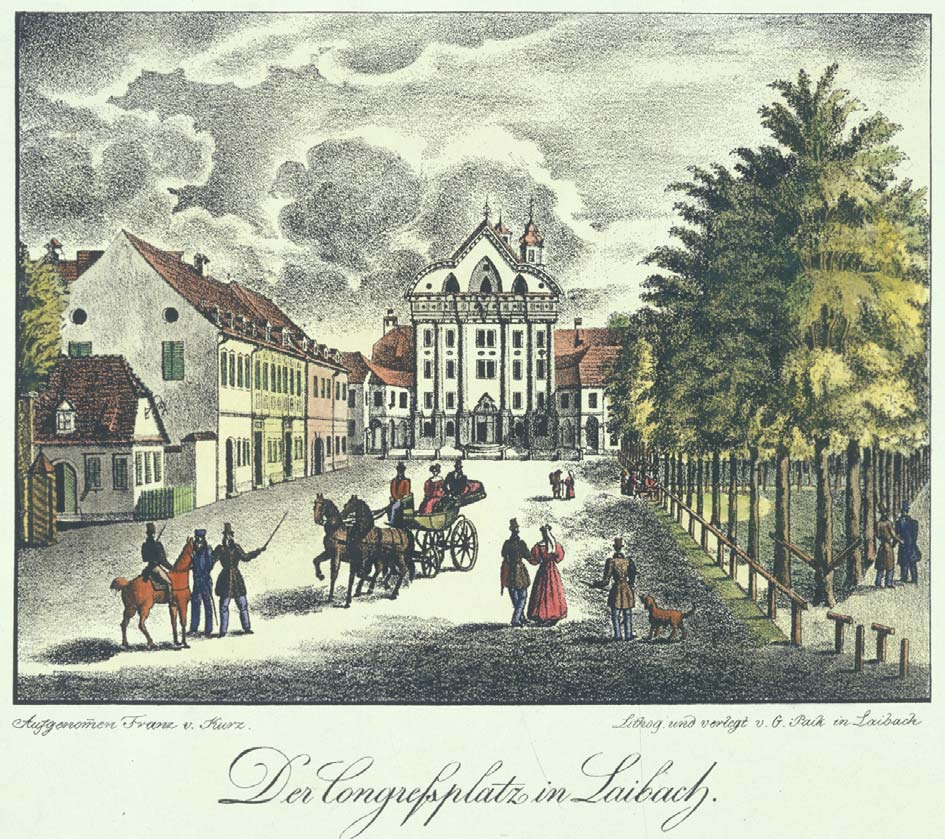
Congress Square in the first half of the 19th century

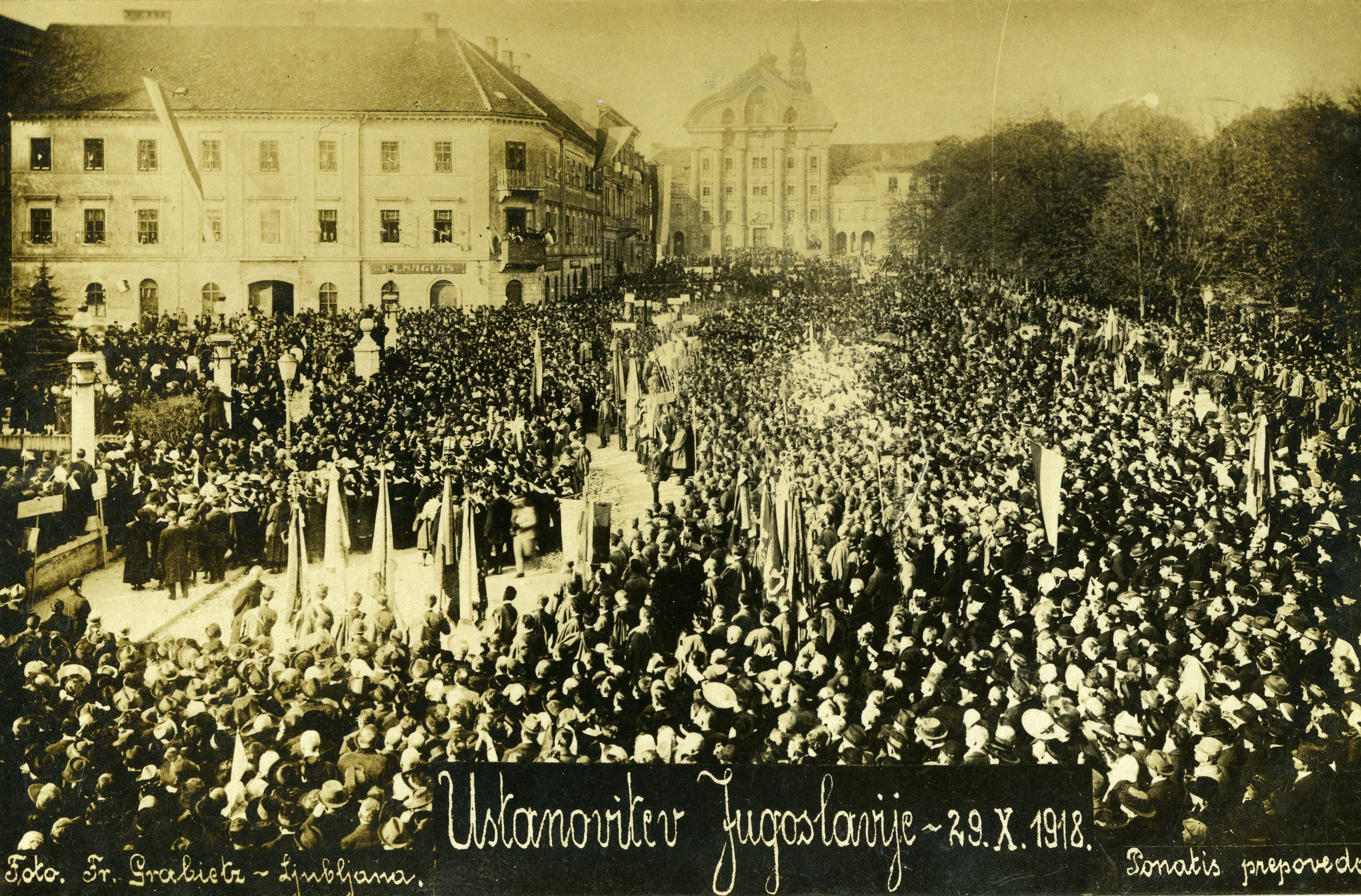
Proclamation of the State of Slovenes, Croats and Serbs on October 29, 1918

== Buildings and monuments ==
Several important buildings face the square. Among them, there is the early Baroque Ursuline Church of the Holy Trinity, the Casino Building, one of the few Neoclassical buildings remaining in Ljubljana after the earthquake of 1895, the Slovenian Philharmonic building, and the rectorate of the University of Ljubljana, formerly the seat of the Provincial Diet of the Duchy of Carniola. The Slovenska matica publishing house also has its seat on the square.

In 1852, a full length statue of the Austrian field marshal Joseph Radetzky was erected in the square. It depicted Radetzky in the battle against the Italian army encouraging his soldiers. The statue was removed six years later, after Radetzky's death, because the town councillors found out that a cast was not decent enough for a monument. In 1860, they erected in a ceremony a bust statue created by the Austrian sculptor Anton Dominik Fernkorn. It was almost two meters high and made of bronze, and was the first representative public statue. The field marshal was depicted highly realistically in his suit with decorations and a laurel wreath as a symbol of victory and glory. The statue was meant to reflect the loyalty to the Habsburg crown and was the place of all events on a high level in Ljubljana, but also the meeting place for drunk citizens at night. The statue was removed by "patriots" in the night of the December 30, 1918, after the collapse of Austria-Hungary and the end of World War II, and later placed in the National Museum.

In the frame of Plečnik's renovation prior to World War II, new trees were planted in the park, most of which are still there today. In 1940, an equestrian statue of King Alexander I of Yugoslavia created by the architect Lojze Dolinar was erected in the middle of the square. In 1941, the statue was removed by the Fascist Italian occupation forces. In 1954, after the formal annexation of Zone B of the Free Territory of Trieste to Yugoslavia, an anchor was placed in the park to symbolize victory over Italian expansionism and the union of the Slovenian Littoral with the rest of Slovenia.

Several other monuments also stand on the square: Jože Plečnik's memorial to the women who protested against the political imprisonment of Slovene patriots during the Italian occupation of the Province of Ljubljana, a fountain with drinking water designed by the architect Boris Kobe, and a replica of a golden Roman monument found among the ruins of Emona. A Biedermeier bandstand from the 1830s also stands in the park.

In December 2004, the artist Matej Andraž Vogrinčič set up an "Enchanted Forest" in the square consisting of 1,000 potted fir trees. The trees were later donated to the Slovene Forestry Institute, which used them to reforest areas in the northwest of the country

=== Gallery ===
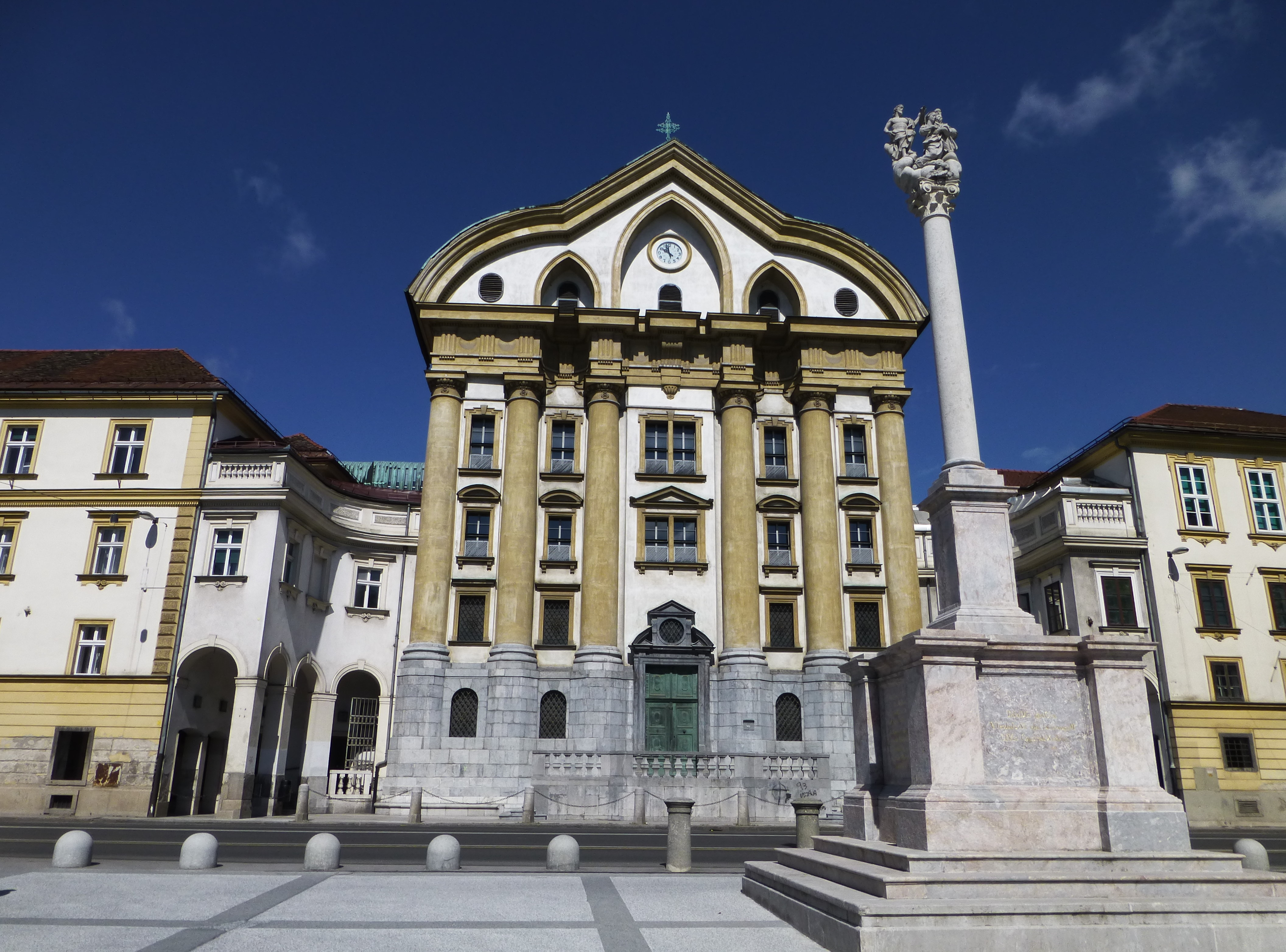
Ursuline Church of the Holy Trinity and the Holy Trinity Column

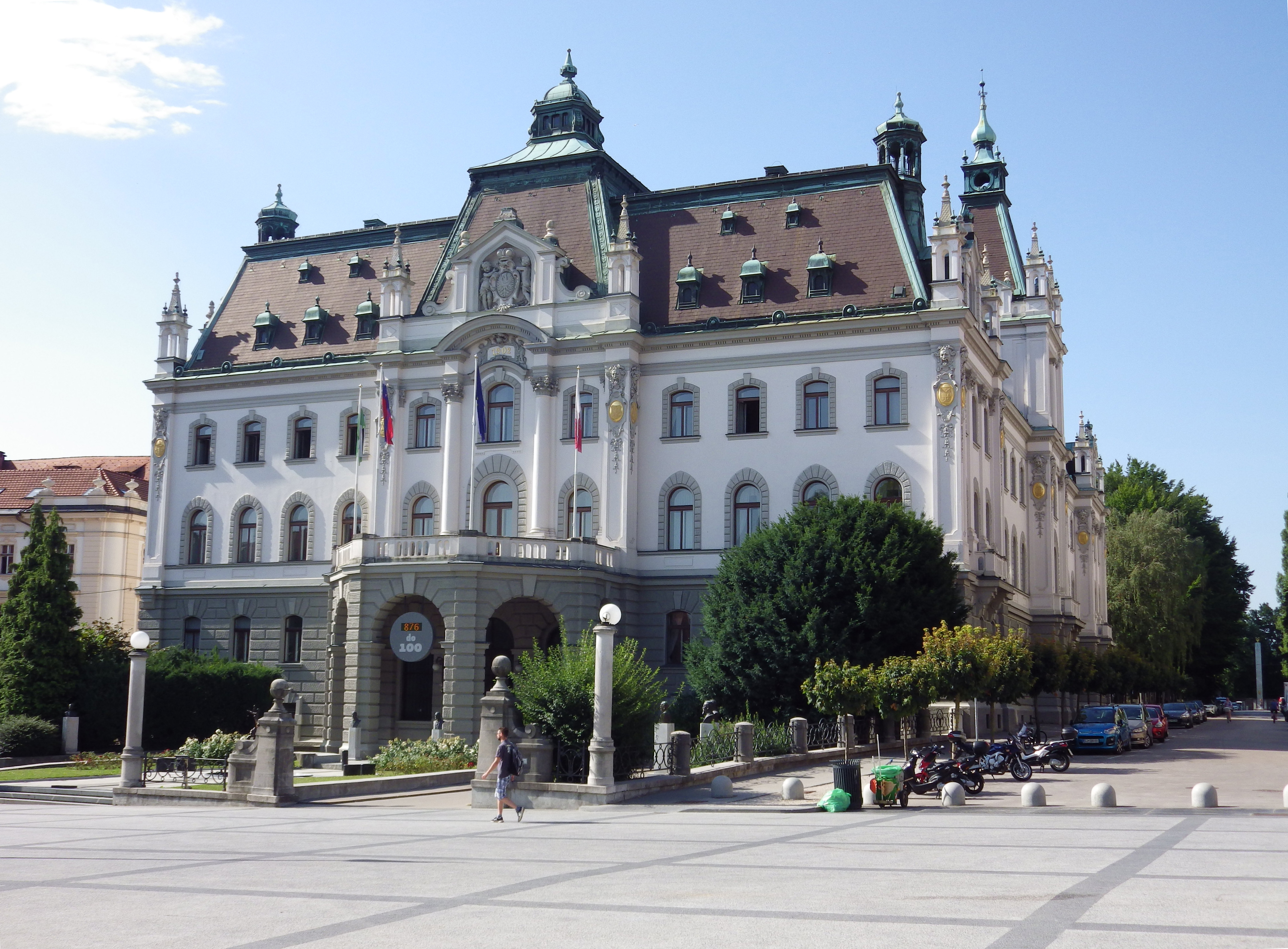
Seat of the University of Ljubljana, formerly the Carniolan State Mansion

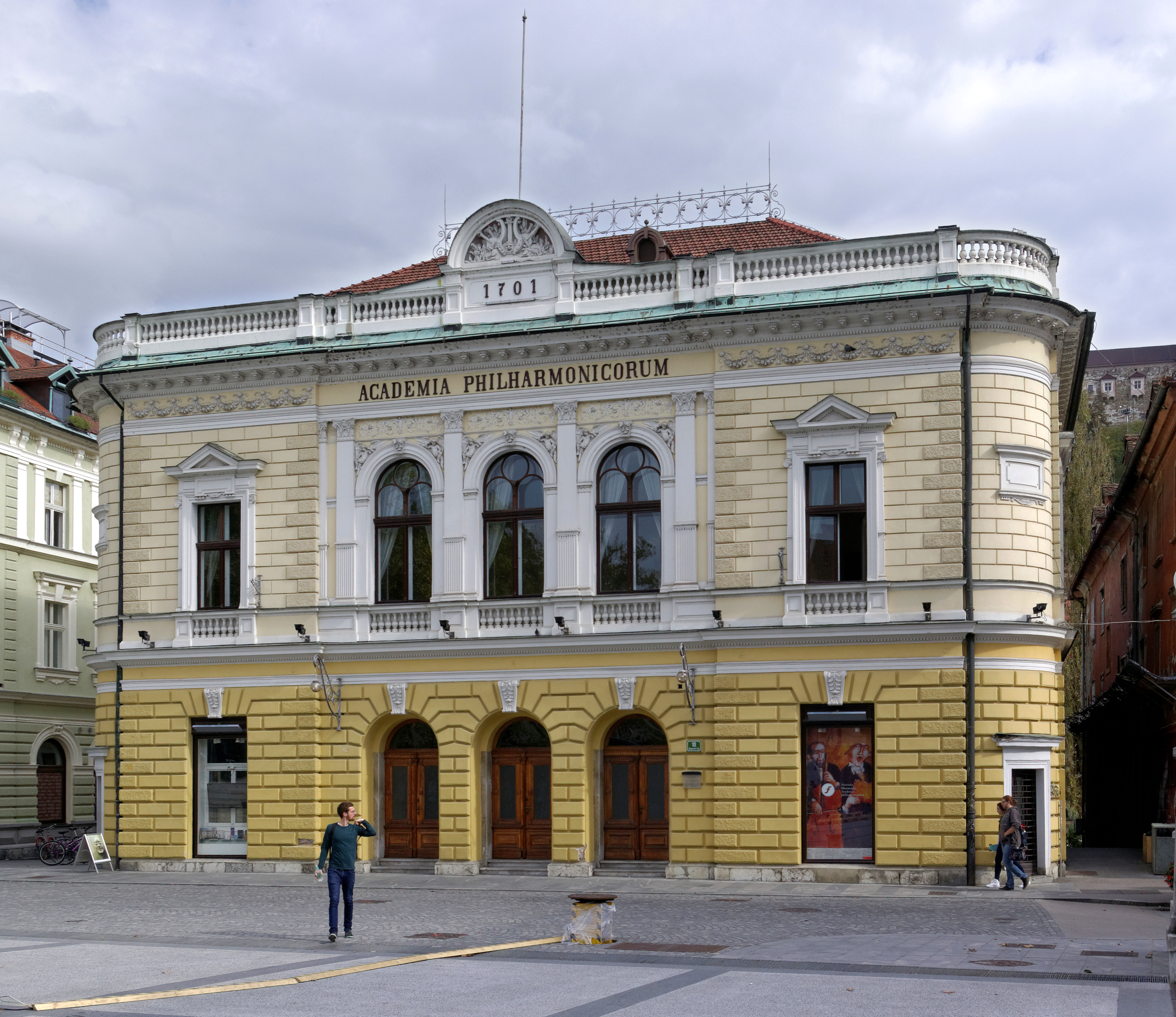
Slovenian Philharmonic

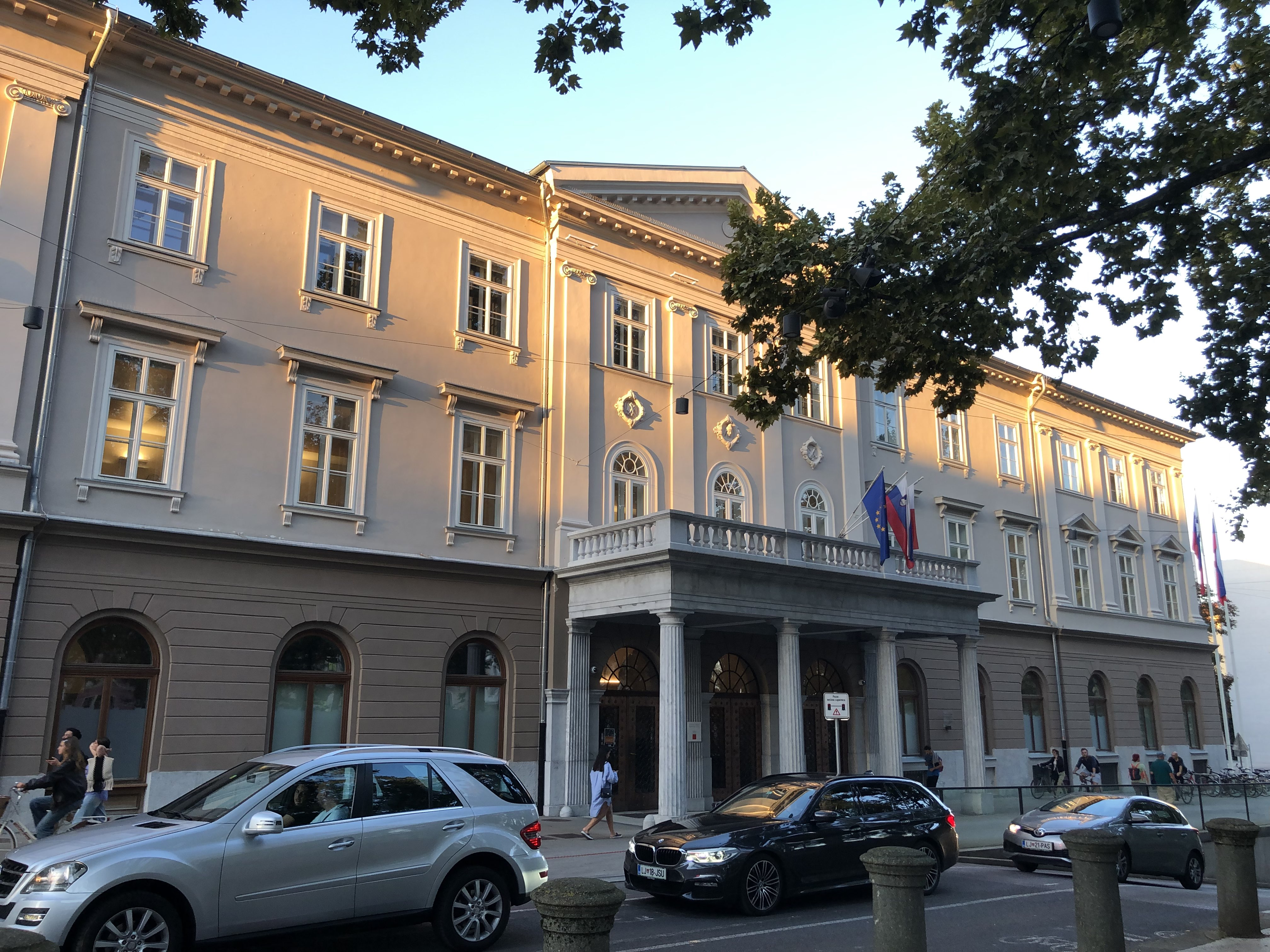
Casino Building

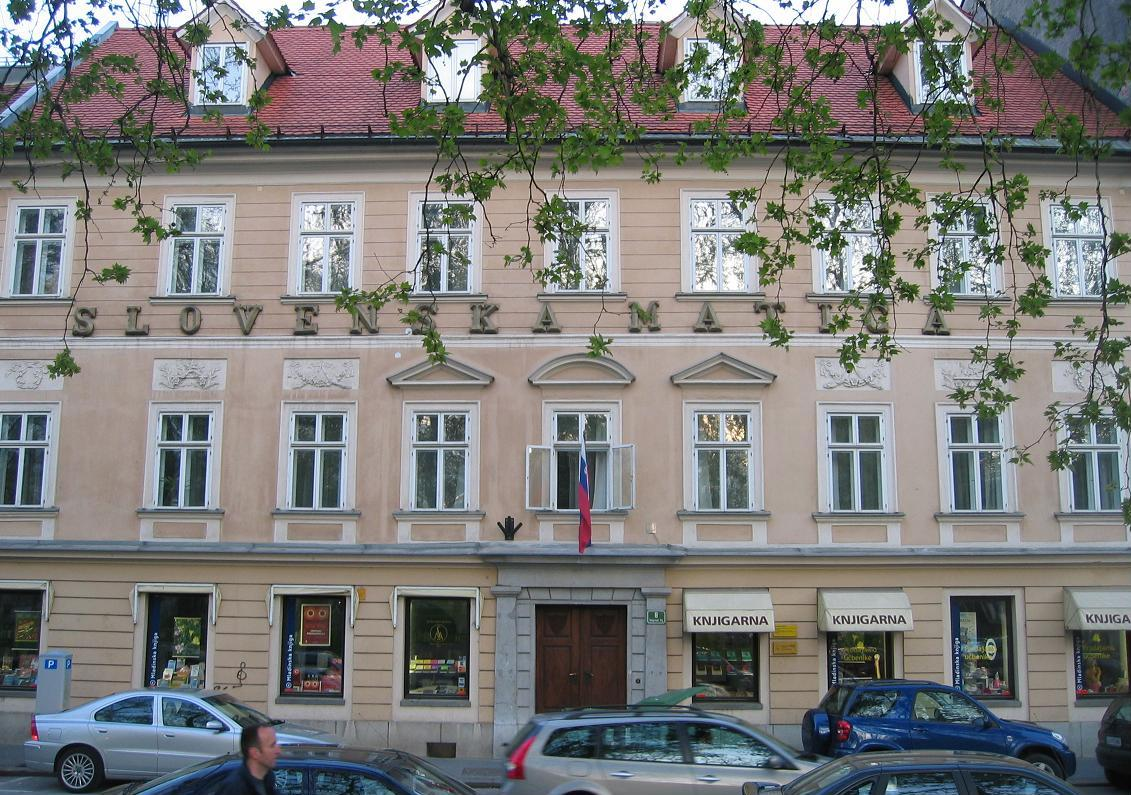
The Slovene Society building

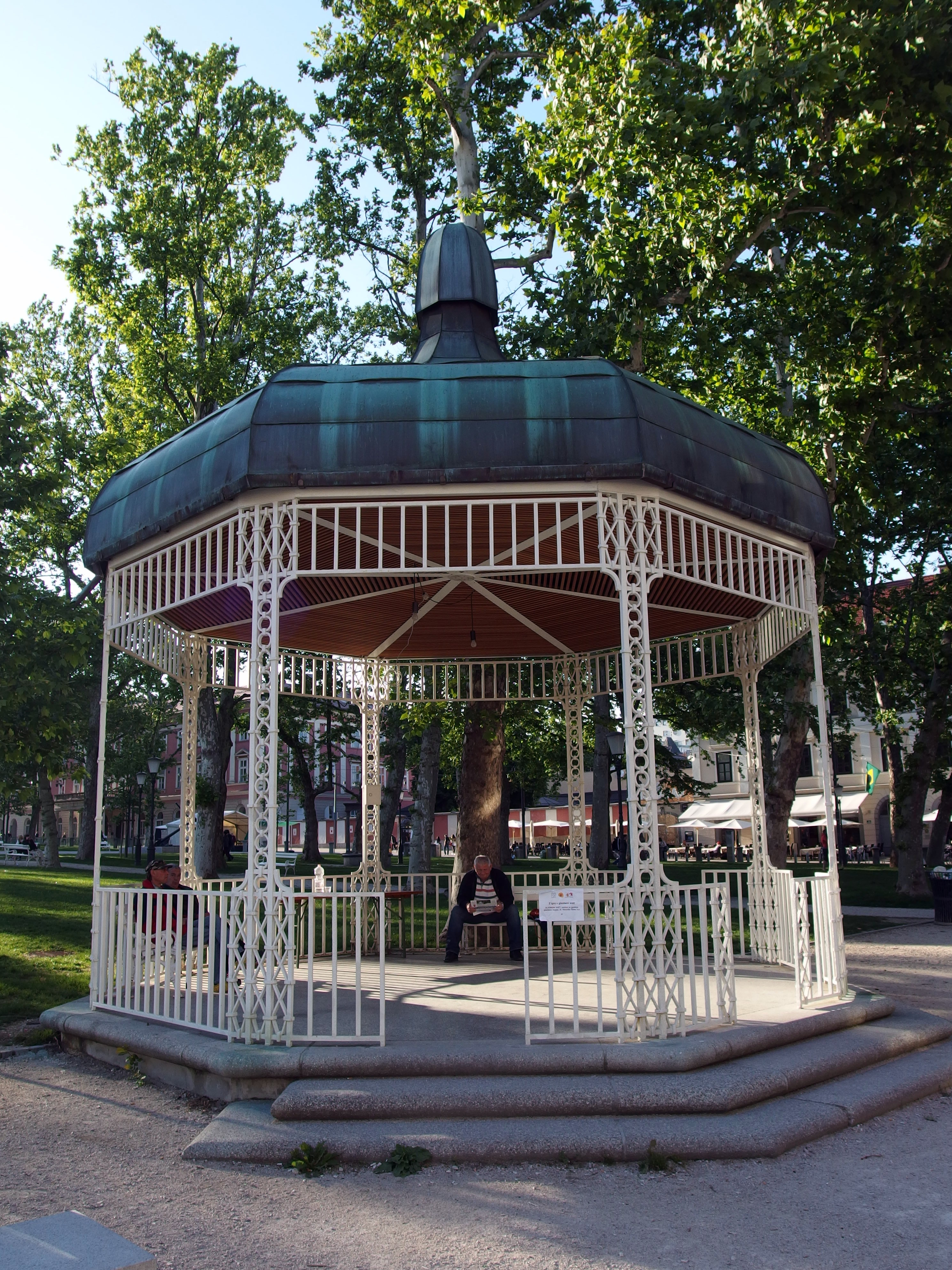
Park bandstand

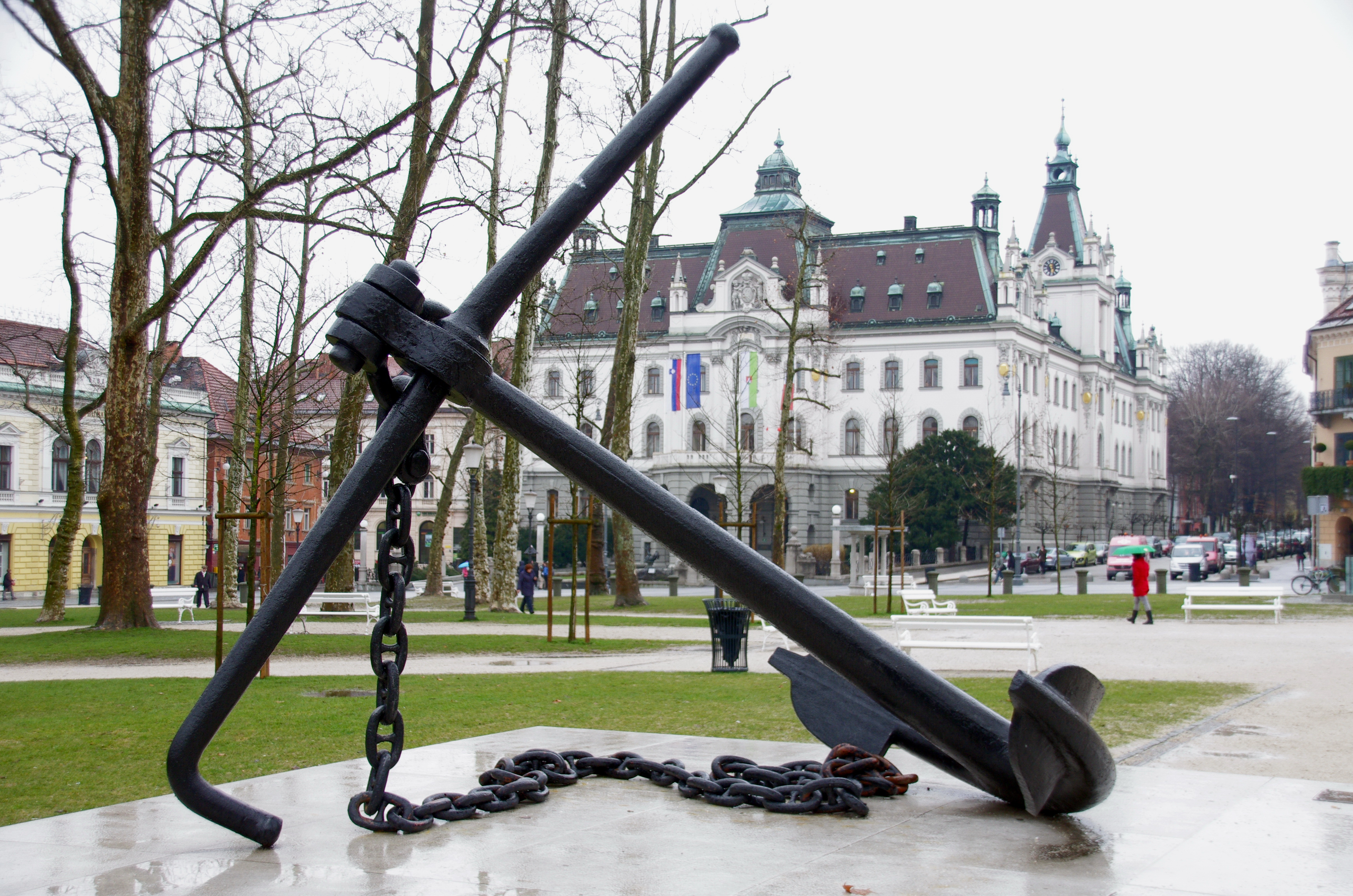
The anchor monument

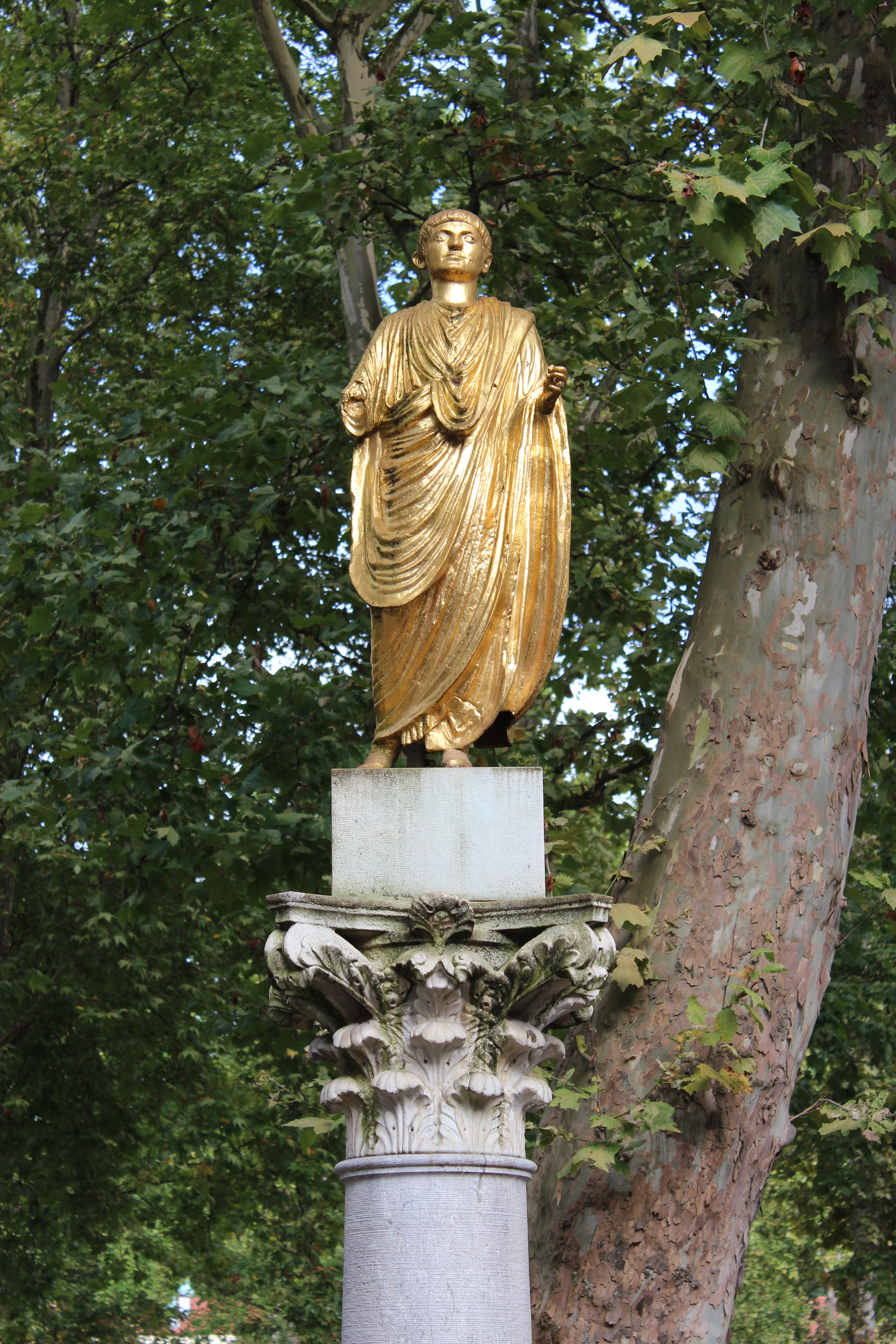
Replica of The Emona Citizen

Aerial view from Congress Square
