= Osojnik =

Osojnik may refer to:

== Places ==
- Osojnik, Dubrovnik-Neretva County, a village near Dubrovnik, Croatia
- Osojnik, Primorje-Gorski Kotar County, a village near Vrbovsko, Croatia
- Osojnik, Semič, a village in Lower Carniola, Slovenia
- Osojnik, Železniki, a village in Upper Carniola, Slovenia

== People ==
- Iztok Osojnik (born 1951), Slovene poet and essayist
- Mojca Osojnik (born 1970), Slovene painter and illustrator

== See also ==
- Osojnica
