= Casino Building =

Building in Ljubljana, Slovenia

Coordinates: 46°3′3.06″N 14°30′12.38″E

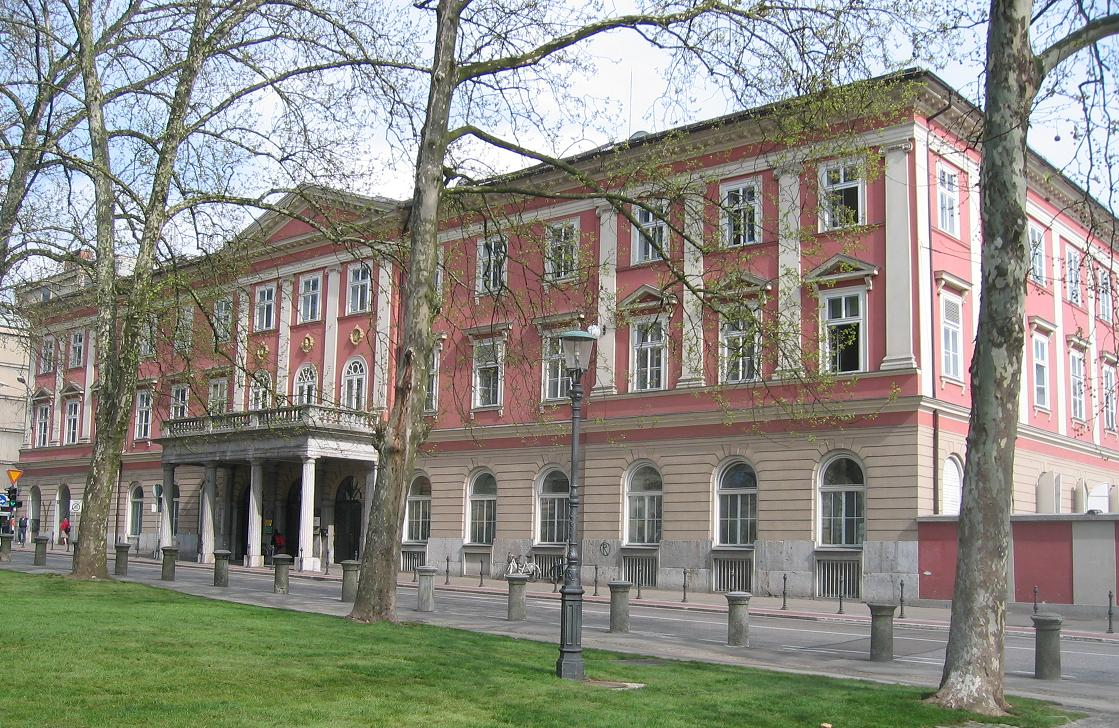
The Casino Building, built in the Neoclassical style, faces the northwest corner of Congress Square.

The Casino Building (Slovene: Kazina) is a Neoclassical building in the city centre of Ljubljana, the capital of Slovenia. It stands in the northwestern corner of Congress Square next to the crossroad of Slovene Street (Slovenska cesta) and Šubic Street (Šubičeva ulica). In the past, it was the meeting place of Ljubljana's higher social classes. Today the Casino Building houses several institutions, including the Institute of Modern History, the Archives of Slovenia, the France Marolt Academic Folklore Society, and the Tone Tomšič Academic Choir.

== History ==
The Casino Building was built in 1837 at the initiative of the Casino Society (Kazinsko društvo), Ljubljana high society's social club. The Casino Building was a meeting place with a well-stocked reading room, and was the venue for numerous social events. It was the venue of a dance where the Slovene poet France Prešeren was meeting his muse, Julija Primic. By the turn of the century, the restaurant had become a meeting place for the German community in the city, thus it was named the German Casino (German: Deutsches Casino).
