= Holy Spirit Church, Javorca =

- Holy Spirit Church, Javorca

- Geographic position in Slovenia
- 46°14′5.19″N 13°43′11.50″E
- Location: Javorca, Zatolmin
- Country: Slovenia
- Denomination: Catholic

History
- Status: Memorial church
- Dedication: Holy Spirit

Architecture
- Functional status: active
- Architect: Remigius Geyling (1916)
- Completed: 1916

Administration
- Metropolis: Ljubljana
- Diocese: Koper
- Deanery: Tolmin
- Parish: Tolmin

Holy Spirit Church, Javorca is a memorial church near Zatolmin in Slovenia. It is located on Javorca Hill (elevation: 571 meters or 1,873 feet) above the Polog Plateau, and is about 8 kilometers (5.0 mi) from the village. It was built as a memorial church for fallen soldiers on the Battles of the Isonzo. Near the church is located Blek's farmhouse, which was renovated in the year 1998, after the earthquake in Posočje, but doesn't have any residents. Access to the church is on the road from Zatolmin, which goes steep above the Tolminka River and crosses several smaller streams and smaller waterfalls. Not far from Javorca is a permanent settlement Zastenar farmhouse.

Holy Spirit Church on Javorca was built between 1 March 1916 and 1 November 1916 in the times of Battles of the Isonzo. It was designed by Vienna's architect and lieutenant Remigius Geyling an Austrian painter, who was friend of Gustav Klimt in Vienna. Construction leader was a Hungarian Geza Jablonsky. The church was built in solidarity within the 3rd mountain brigade of the Austro-Hungarian army and various soldiers who were there at the times of the Battles of the Isonzo. Memorial church is built mostly from wood: altar, ceiling and walls into which are engraved the names of the 2808 fallen soldiers. On the entrance door is written a Latin scripture Ultra cineres hostium ira non superest (Hate should not be over the ashes of the dead).

The memorial church dedicated to the Holy Spirit on Javorca in the Tolminka Valley has a sign of the European Heritage Label since the year 2018, joining the 38 similar monuments in Europe. In Slovenia only Franja Partisan Hospital has also the sign of the European Heritage Label. The highest European recognition for cultural heritage has church received because of the values which it represents. It is dedicated to the fallen soldiers in World War I independent from their origin or culture. It represents values such as: peace, human dignity, respect for different cultures, religions and nationalities.

== See also ==
- Tolmin Museum
