= Kandija Bridge =

Iron bridge in Slovenia

Coordinates: 45°48′6.5″N 15°10′14.7″E

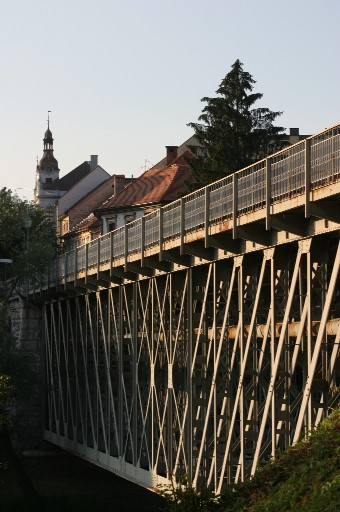
The Kandija Bridge

The Kandija Bridge (in Slovene: Kandijski most), or the Old Bridge (Stari most) is an iron bridge in Novo Mesto, Slovenia. It connects the old city core on the left side of the Krka River with Kandija, a historical suburb of Novo Mesto, on its right side. The bridge stands at the lower part of Main Square. It was built in 1898 to replace the old wooden bridge from 1600, located a few dozen metres upstream. The opening took place on 23 November 1898. The riveted structure bridging the Krka with a single 75-metre (246 ft) arch is a unique structure in Slovenia. Since 1992, it has been protected as a cultural monument. It was renovated in 1977, 1996, and 2009.
