= Julija Primic =

Slovenian muse

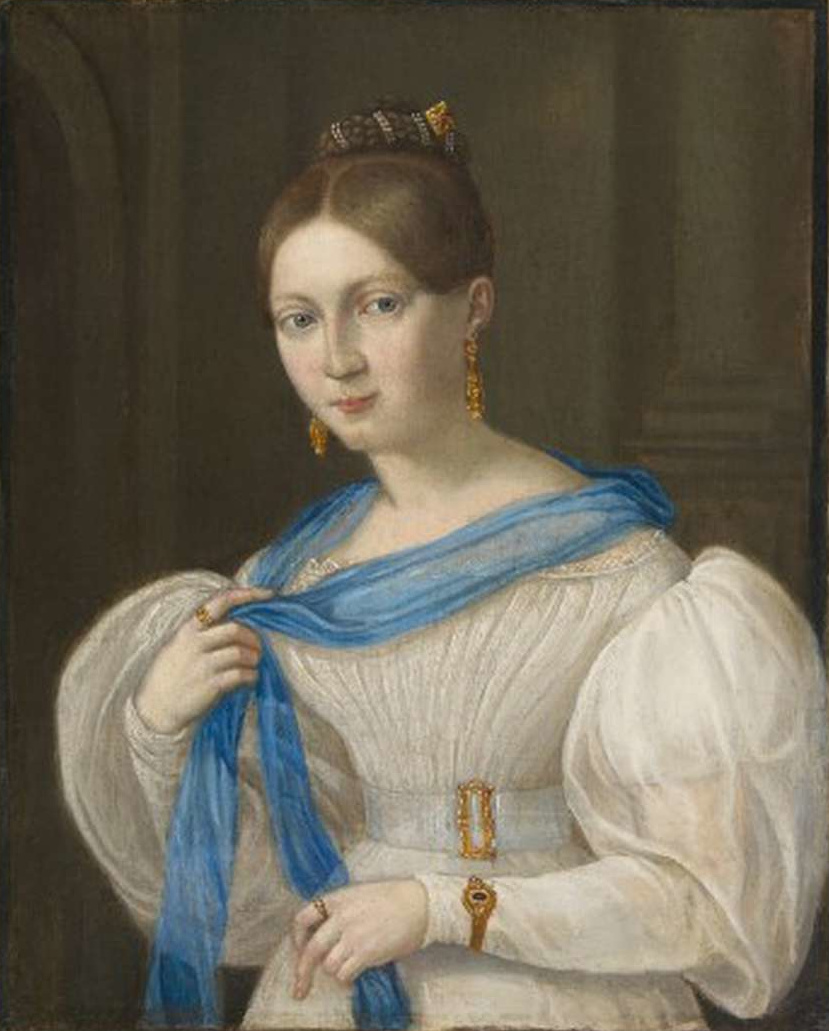
- Born: Juliana Maria Antonia Primitz; 30 May 1816; Ljubljana
- Died: 2 February 1864 (aged 47); Neuhof, Kandija
- Other name: Juliana von Scheuchenstuel
- Known for: poetic muse

Julija Primic, married von Scheuchenstuel (also known as Primičeva Julija in Slovene) was the poetic muse and unrequited love of the Slovene Romantic and national poet France Prešeren. She was born on 30 May 1816 in Ljubljana and died on 2 February 1864 at Neuhof Castle in Kandija (now part of Novo Mesto).

== Life ==
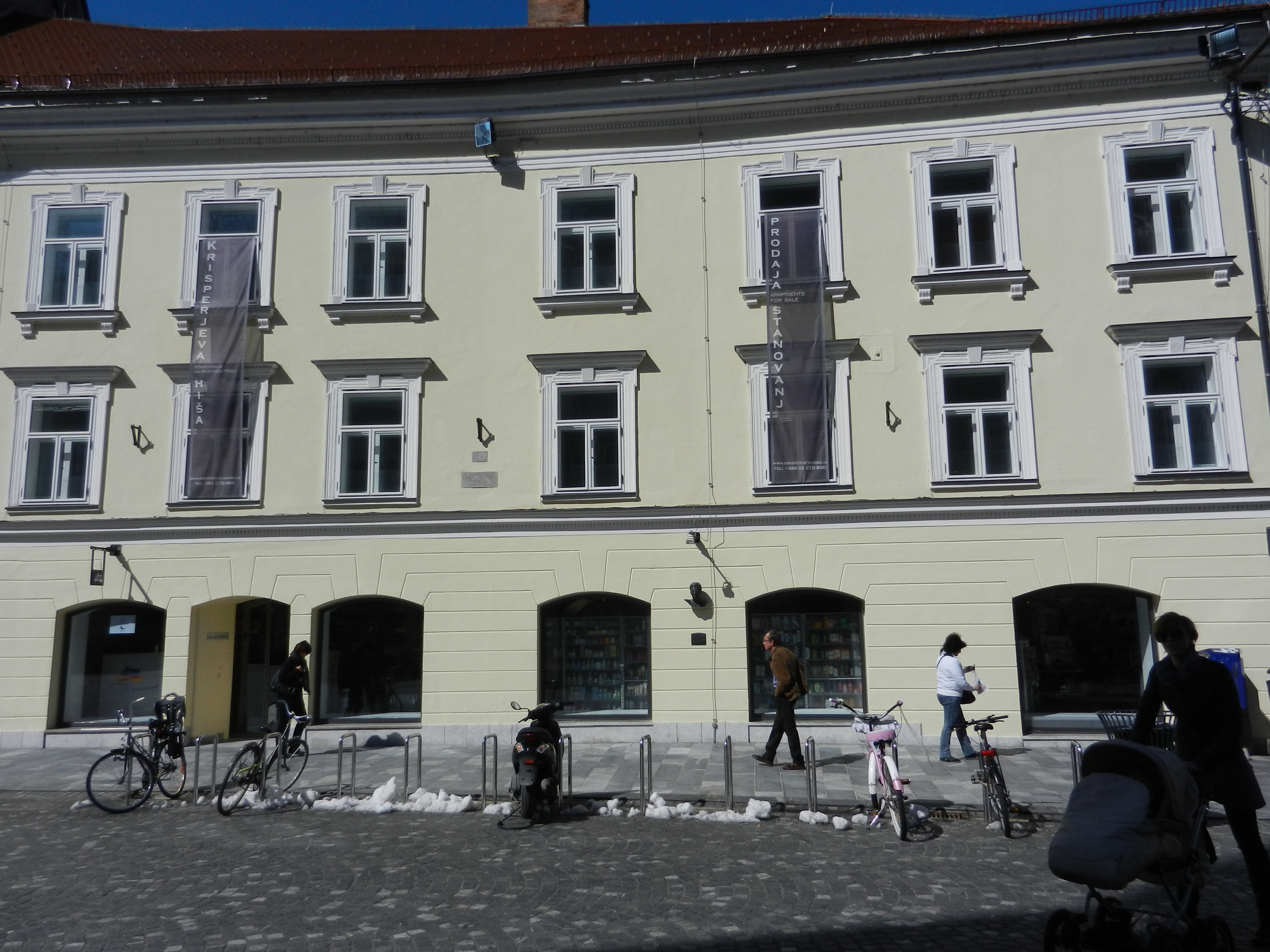
The Krisper House, the birthplace of Julija Primic at Town Square in Ljubljana

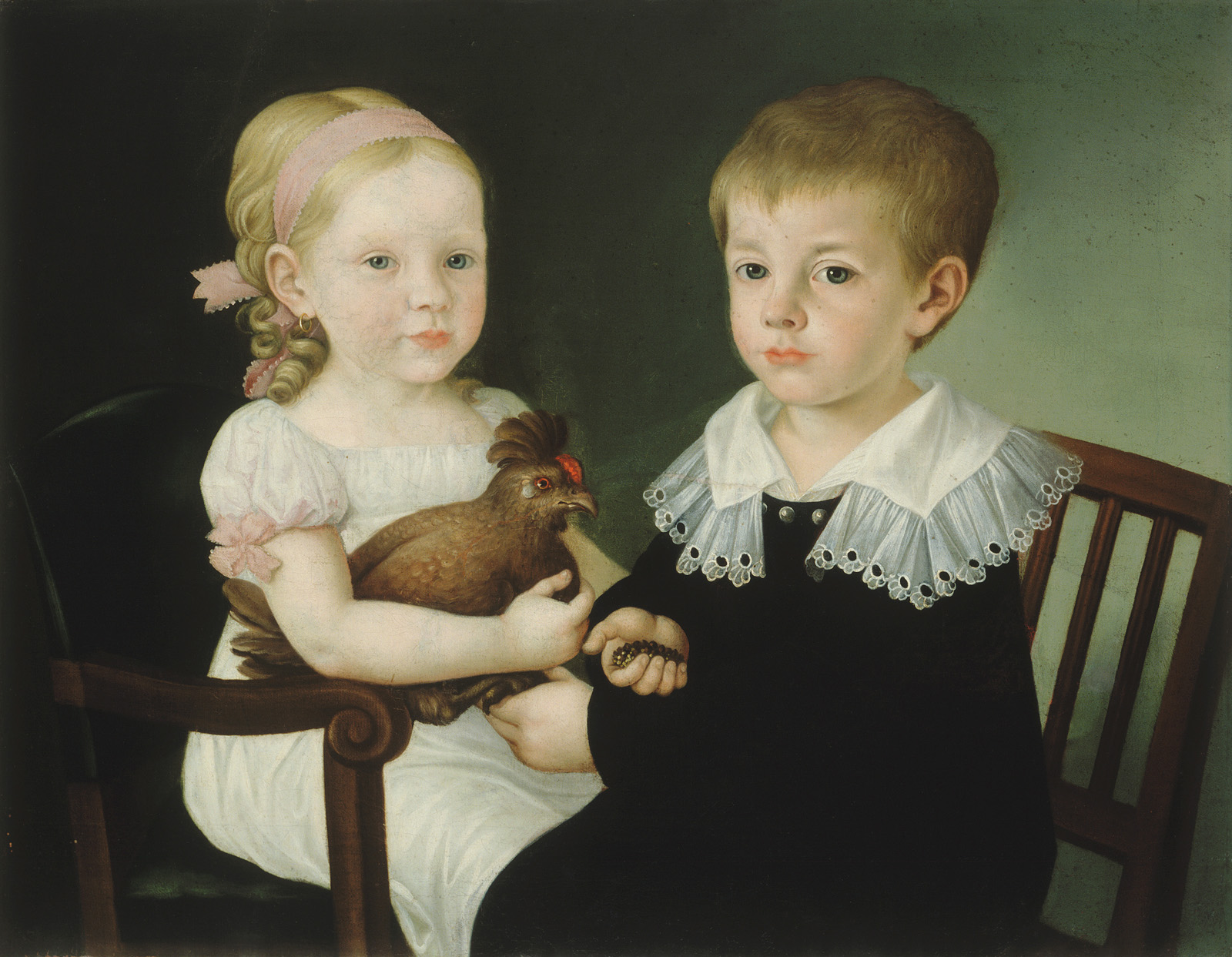
Julija Primic and her brother Janez as children. Portrait by Matevž Langus.

Julija Primic was born on 30 May 1816 in the house (later the Krisper House) at the corner of Hospital Street (today Stritar Street) and Townhall Square (today Town Square) in Ljubljana and baptized Juliana Maria Antonia Primitz. She was the second child of the wealthy merchant Anton Primitz and his wife Julijana née Hartl. The first child was her brother Janez. Julija and her brother were raised by their mother alone since their father died of tuberculosis only two months after Julija's birth. Her mother found solace in raising the children and the work she had to perform after the husband's death. However, because her husband had already introduced her to the trade, they remained one of the wealthiest families in Ljubljana. In 1822, they moved into a house at Theatre Street (today Wolf Street). After the death of Janez in 1832 due to stroke Julija and her mother were left alone and later handed over their shop to the manager Andrej Mallner.

In her youth, Julija was quite withdrawn since her mother raised her according to strict burgeois principles. They only rather attended theatre or visited a dance in the Casino Building. She was only allowed to socialize with peers from prominent families. Her domestic teachers taught her foreign languages, dance steps, and the basic rules of the etiquette. As she was considered one of the wealthiest and most beautiful heiresses in Ljubljana, she attracted quite a bit of attention. France Prešeren also paid her a lot of attention and dedicated one of his most famous poems, Sonetni venec (A Wreath of Sonnets), to her with the acrostic PRIMICOVI JULJI (to Julija Primic). It was published on February 22, 1834, as a supplement to Illyrisches Blatt. On 28 May 1839, after much insistence from her mother, Julija married Josef von Scheuchenstuel, eight years her senior, the son of Bavarian lawyer Anton von Scheuchenstuel. They had five children, four daughters and one son. All her daughters were born in Ljubljana. The first was Marija Julijana in 1840, the second Marija Ana in 1841, the third Antonija Marija in 1844, and the fourth Terezija Jožefa in 1846. When Jožef was promoted to president of the Novo Mesto court, he and Julija's mother moved to Novo Mesto in 1850 and rented the Neuhof mansion there. That same year, their son Jožef Vilijem was born.

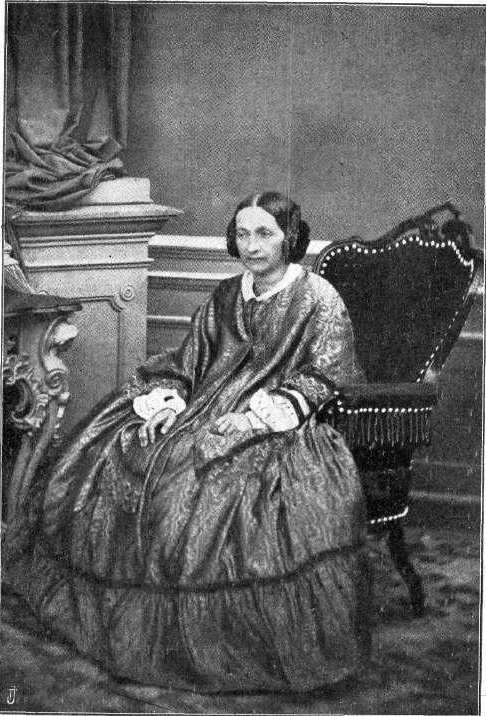
Julija Primic c. 1860

On 26 October 1855, Julija lost her mother to whom she was very attached despite her strictness. She was buried in the cemetery in Šmihel near Novo Mesto. Julija had a severe heart disease which gradually destroyed her and caused her premature death. She died on 2 February 1864, at the age of only 47 years. At her express wish, she lived to see the engagement of her two daughters. She was also buried at the Šmihel cemetery. Her husband had a monument erected, which can still be seen today.

== Julija in Prešeren's poetry ==
Julija is considered Prešeren's poetic muse and unrequited love. Which of his poems were dedicated to Julija was researched particularly by Avgust Žigon, France Kidrič, Anton Slodnjak, Boris Paternu and others. Their opinions vary. According to Kidrič, only Sonetni venec , some later sonnets – Neiztrohnjeno srce, Zdravilo ljubezni, Ženska zvestoba, Ribič, Je od vesel'ga časa teklo leto, and Prekop – but not e.g. Gazele were dedicated to Julija. The sonnet Je od vesel'ga časa teklo leto (A year has passed since the happy times) has raised the problem of interpreting the year 1833 and the event itself that Prešen mentions in it. According to Kidrič and some others, Prešeren is said to have met Julija for the first time at the Trnovo church on Holy Saturday (April 6, 1833) at ten o'clock that year and fell in love with her. Others, however, are of the opinion that this is only a Petrarchist motif.

== Literature ==
- Boris Paternu: France Prešeren in njegovo pesniško delo II.del. Ljubljana: Mladinska knjiga,1976.
- Karel Štrekelj: Zgodovina slovenskega slovstva. Ur. M.Ogrin. Ljubljana: ZRC SAZU, 2014.
- Ivan Sivec: Julija iz Sonetnega venca. Ljubljana: Založba Karantanija, 2006.
- France Kidrič: Prešernove Lavre. Ljubljana: Ljubljanski zvon, 547–553, 1934.
- Aleksander Bjelčevič: Julija je stopila v »cerkev razsvetljeno«: k Žigonovi razlagi Prešernovega soneta Je od vesel'ga časa teklo leto. Slavistična revija, letnik 61/2013, No. 4, October–December.
