= Osojnica, Doboj =

Osojnica Осојница
- Village
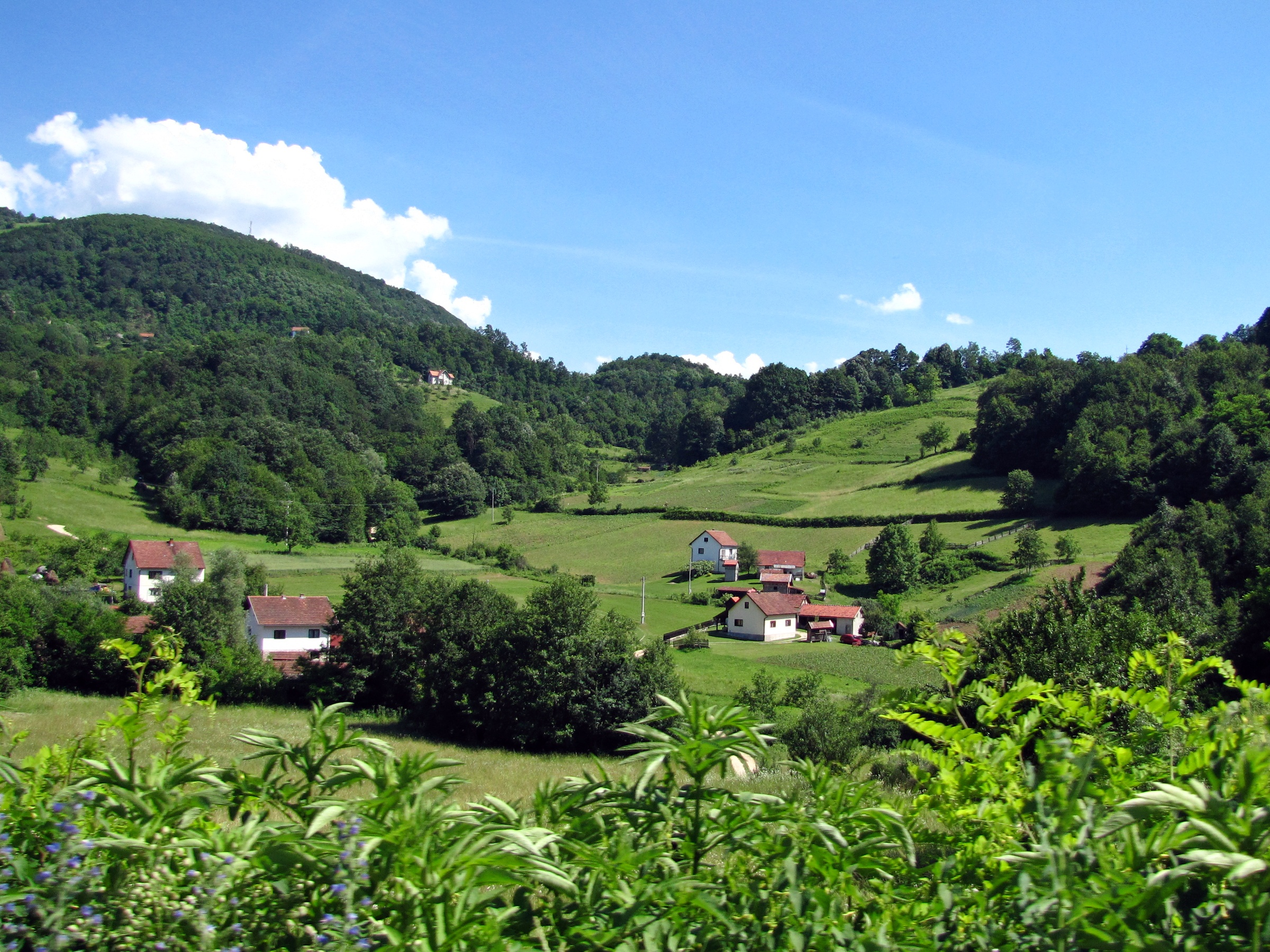
- View of Osojnica
- Interactive map of Osojnica
- Country: Bosnia and Herzegovina
- Entity: Republika Srpska
- Municipality: Doboj
- Time zone: UTC+1 (CET)
  - Summer (DST): UTC+2 (CEST)

Osojnica (Cyrillic: Осојница) is a village in the municipality of Doboj, Republika Srpska, Bosnia and Herzegovina.
