= Zatolmin =

- Interactive map of Zatolmin
- Location in Slovenia
- Coordinates: 46°11′52.3″N 13°43′55.75″E
- Country: Slovenia
- Traditional region: Slovenian Littoral
- Statistical region: Gorizia
- Municipality: Tolmin

Area
  - Total: 19.19 km^{2} (7.41 sq mi)
- Elevation: 324.9 m (1,066 ft)

Population (2002)
  - Total: 332

Zatolmin (pronounced [zatɔlˈmiːn]) is a settlement north of Tolmin in the Littoral region of Slovenia.

== Geography ==
The territory of the settlement extends north from the village into the Julian Alps, with the highest elevation at Leskovca Peak (Slovene: Leskovški vrh), also known as Mount Maselnik (2,013 meters or 6,604 feet). Podlog Cave (Slovene: Podloška jama) lies below Mount Osojnica to the northeast; the cave is 10,800 meters (35,400 ft) long and 704 meters (2,310 ft) deep.

== Churches ==
The local church is dedicated to Saint Peter and belongs to the Parish of Tolmin. A second church of the Holy Spirit, built in the hills high above the settlement in the area known as Javorca, is a memorial church from the First World War and is dedicated to the Holy Spirit. The church was built by Austrian soldiers in 1916 based on plans by the Austrian architect Remigius Geyling (1878–1974). Its exterior portrays the stylized crests of the kingdoms and provinces of Austria-Hungary. The brightly colored interior of the church is decorated in the Vienna Secession style. Oak plaques bear the names of the Austro-Hungarian soldiers that fell at battles in the area. The church has been remodeled several times, most recently in 2005. It was declared a cultural and historical monument in 1990. The interior of the church can be viewed from May through September by contacting the Sotočje local tourist organization in Tolmin.
