= Ivan Čargo =

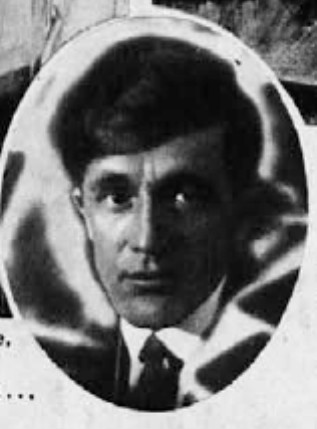
- Born: February 25, 1898
- Died: August 11, 1958 (aged 60)

Ivan Čargo (February 25, 1898 – August 11, 1958) was a Slovene painter, illustrator, scenographer, and caricaturist.

Čargo was born in Tolmin on February 25, 1898. He studied painting in Florence and Rome. From 1924 to 1927 he worked as a scenographer at the Popular Theater (Slovene: Ljudsko gledališče) in Gorizia, and then lived in Belgrade from 1927 to 1937. During the Second World War he spent time in various prisons until the Italian capitulation in 1943, after which he joined the Slovene Partisans' Overseas Brigade. After the war, he lived a Bohemian lifestyle in Ljubljana.

Initially he painted in the Impressionist style, following the lead of Rihard Jakopič. His education in Italy and travel increased his enthusiasm for Futurism and Expressionism, and he was also attracted by bold Constructivism. He later introduced elements of Cubism into his painting. After 1931 he mostly produced drawings in red chalk and red pencil; he addressed social themes and developed his own style. He was also engaged in scenography and caricatures, and created newspaper illustrations.

His most characteristic motifs included manual laborers, miners, Ivan Cankar's character the farmhand Jernej, Maxim Gorky, and Vladimir Lenin. His most significant works include his Futurist paintings Avtoportret (Self Portrait, 1926), Portret arhitekta (Portrait of an Architect, 1926), Ljudje na sprehodu (People on a Walk, 1931), and V jetnišnici (In Prison, 1931).

Čargo died in Ljubljana on August 11, 1958. Posthumous exhibitions of his works were held in 1972 at the Ljubljana City Gallery (Slovene: Mestna galerija Ljubljana) and in 1981 at the Gorizia Museum (Slovene: Goriški muzej) in Nova Gorica.
