= Ravne =

Ravne, meaning plains or flats in South Slavic languages, may refer to several places in Slovenia:

- Drežniške Ravne, a settlement in the Municipality of Kobarid
- Grgarske Ravne, a settlement in the Municipality of Nova Gorica
- Kneške Ravne, a settlement in the Municipality of Tolmin
- Livške Ravne, a settlement in the Municipality of Kobarid
- Ravne, Cerknica, a settlement in the Municipality of Cerknica
- Ravne, Kočevje, a hamlet in the Municipality of Kočevje
- Ravne, Železniki, a settlement in the Municipality of Železniki
- Ravne, Ajdovščina, a settlement in the Municipality of Ajdovščina
- Ravne Castle, a castle near the town of Ravne na Koroškem
- Ravne, Cerklje na Gorenjskem, a settlement in the Municipality of Cerklje na Gorenjskem
- Ravne na Blokah, a settlement in the Municipality of Bloke
- Ravne na Koroškem, a town, the administrative centre of the Municipality of Ravne na Koroškem
- Ravne pri Šmartnem, a settlement in the Municipality of Kamnik
- Ravne pri Žireh, a settlement in the Municipality of Žiri
- Ravne pri Cerknem, a settlement in the Municipality of Cerkno
- Ravne v Bohinju, a settlement in the Municipality of Bohinj
- Tolminske Ravne, a settlement in the Municipality of Tolmin

and in Bosnia and Herzegovina:

- Ravne, Kladanj, a settlement in the Municipality of Kladanj
- Ravne, Vareš, a settlement in the Municipality of Vareš
