= Farmhouse =

Chief dwellings attached to farms

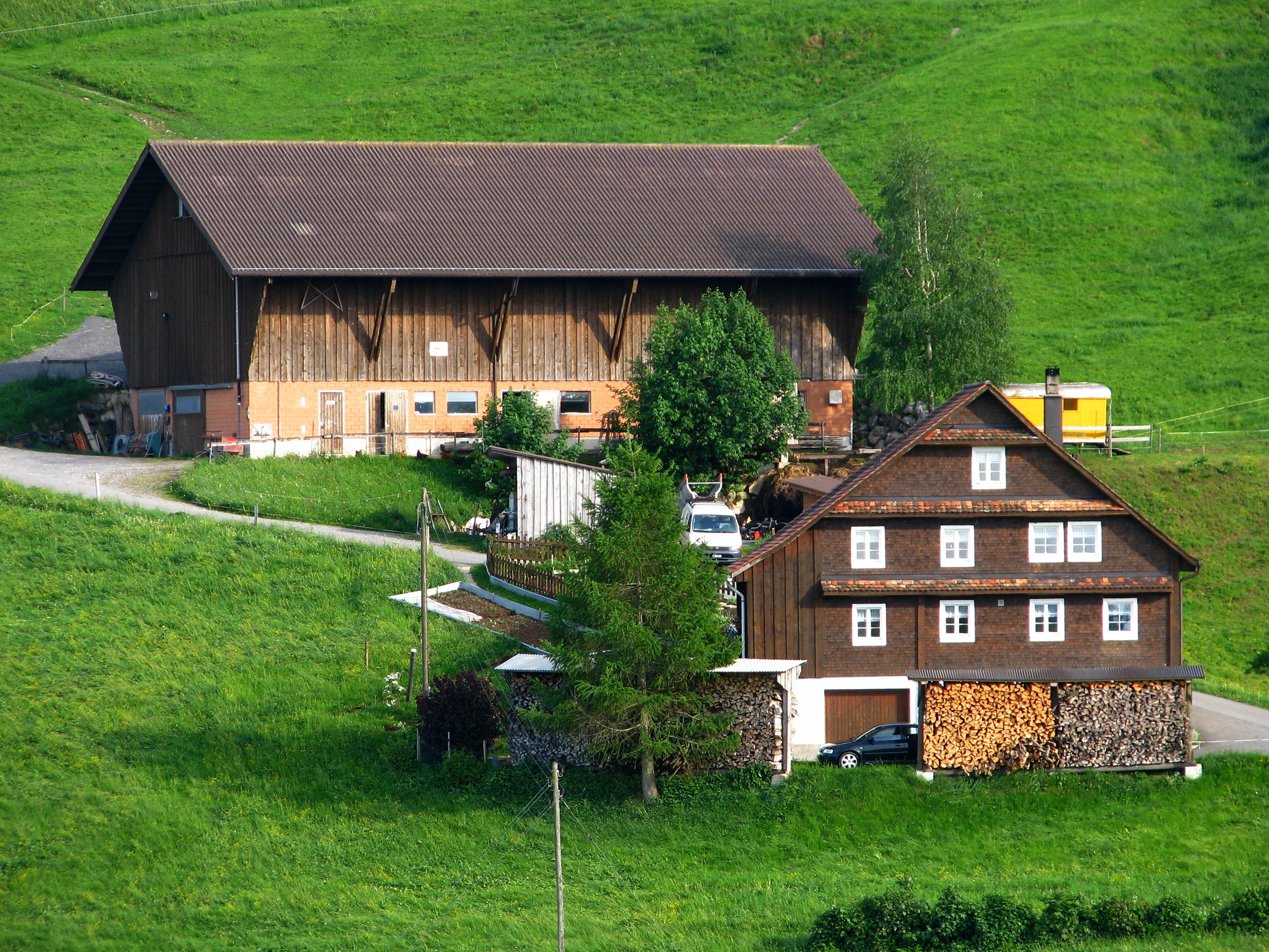
A farmhouse (at bottom) in Einsiedeln, Switzerland

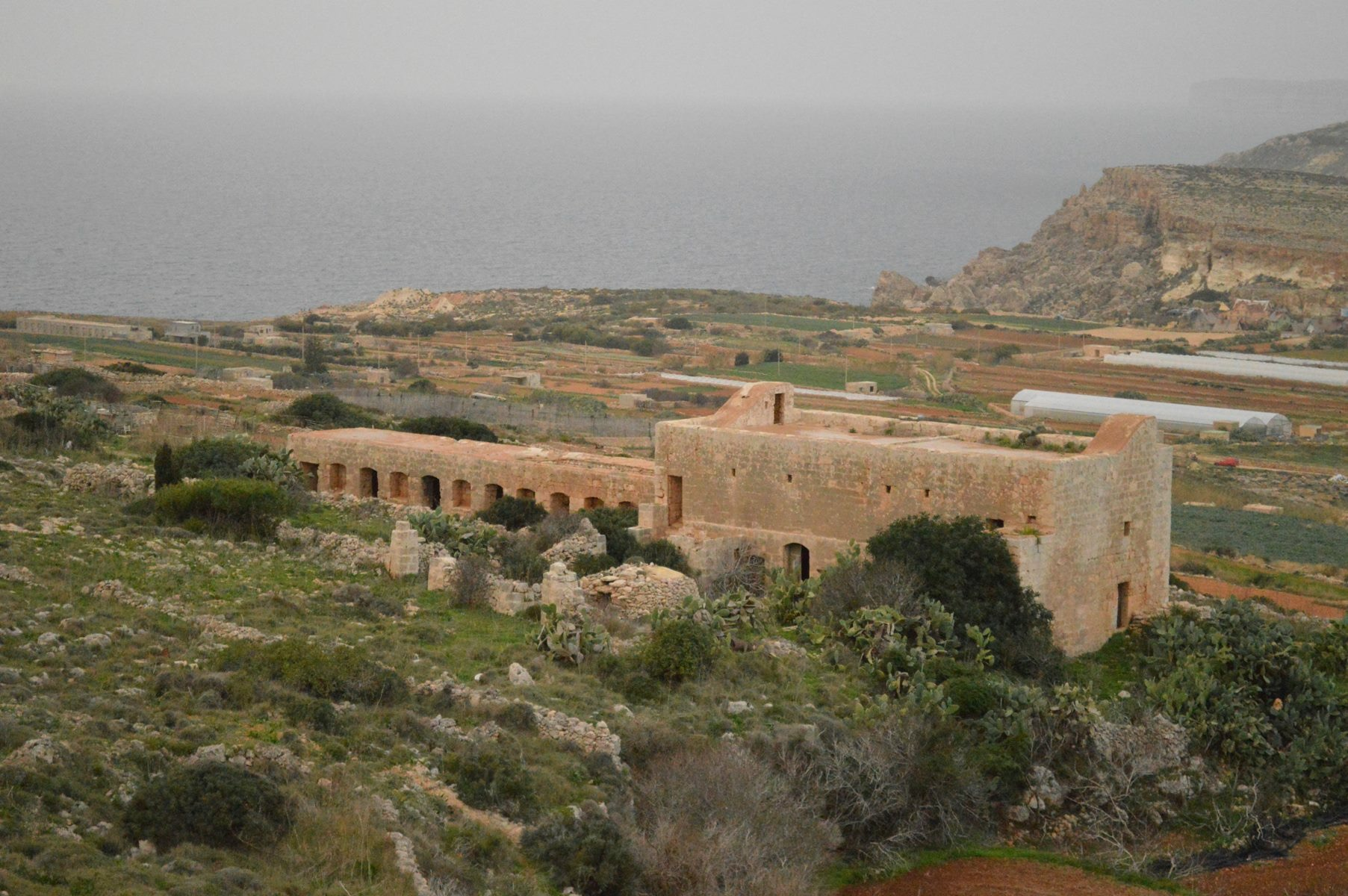
The Devil's Farmhouse in Mellieħa, Malta, built by the Order of St. John with limestone

A farmhouse is a building that serves as the primary quarters in a rural or agricultural setting. Historically, farmhouses were often combined with space for animals called a housebarn. Other farmhouses may be connected to one or more barns, built to form a courtyard, or with each farm building separate from each other.

== Ranch house ==
A rancho (from Spanish: rancho / Mexican Spanish) is a tract of land, including various structures, given over primarily to cattle ranching, the practice of raising grazing livestock such as cattle and sheep. It's a subtype of truss. These terms are most often applied to livestock operations in Mexico, the western United States and Western Canada, although there are ranches in other areas as well. A ranch (also known as an American ranch, California ranch, rambler or rancher) is an interior architectural style that originated in the United States. The ranch style home is known for its long, close to the ground profile and wide open floor plan. The style combined modernist ideas and styles with American West period notions of wide open spaces to create a very informal and casual lifestyle.

First appearing as a residential style in the 1920s, the ranch was extremely popular with the burgeoning post-war middle class of the 1940s through the 1970s. The style is often associated with tract housing built during this time, especially in the southwestern United States, which experienced a population explosion during this period, with a corresponding demand for housing. Architect Cliff May is often credited with pioneering ranch house design in the 1930s, designing it as a comfortable and affordable living space tailored to the needs of the average American family. The style was soon exported to other countries and became popular worldwide. Its popularity waned in the late twentieth century as neo-eclectic house styles with historic and traditional decor became more popular.

Preservation movements have begun in some ranch house neighborhoods, fueled by interest in the style from a younger generation that did not grow up in such homes. This revival has been compared to what other house styles, such as the bungalow and Queen Anne, experienced in the twentieth century.

Options include California Ranch, Suburban Ranch, Multi-Level Ranch, Elevated Ranch, and Book Ranch.

== Types of farmhouses ==
=== Europe ===
Types of farmhouses in Europe include the following:

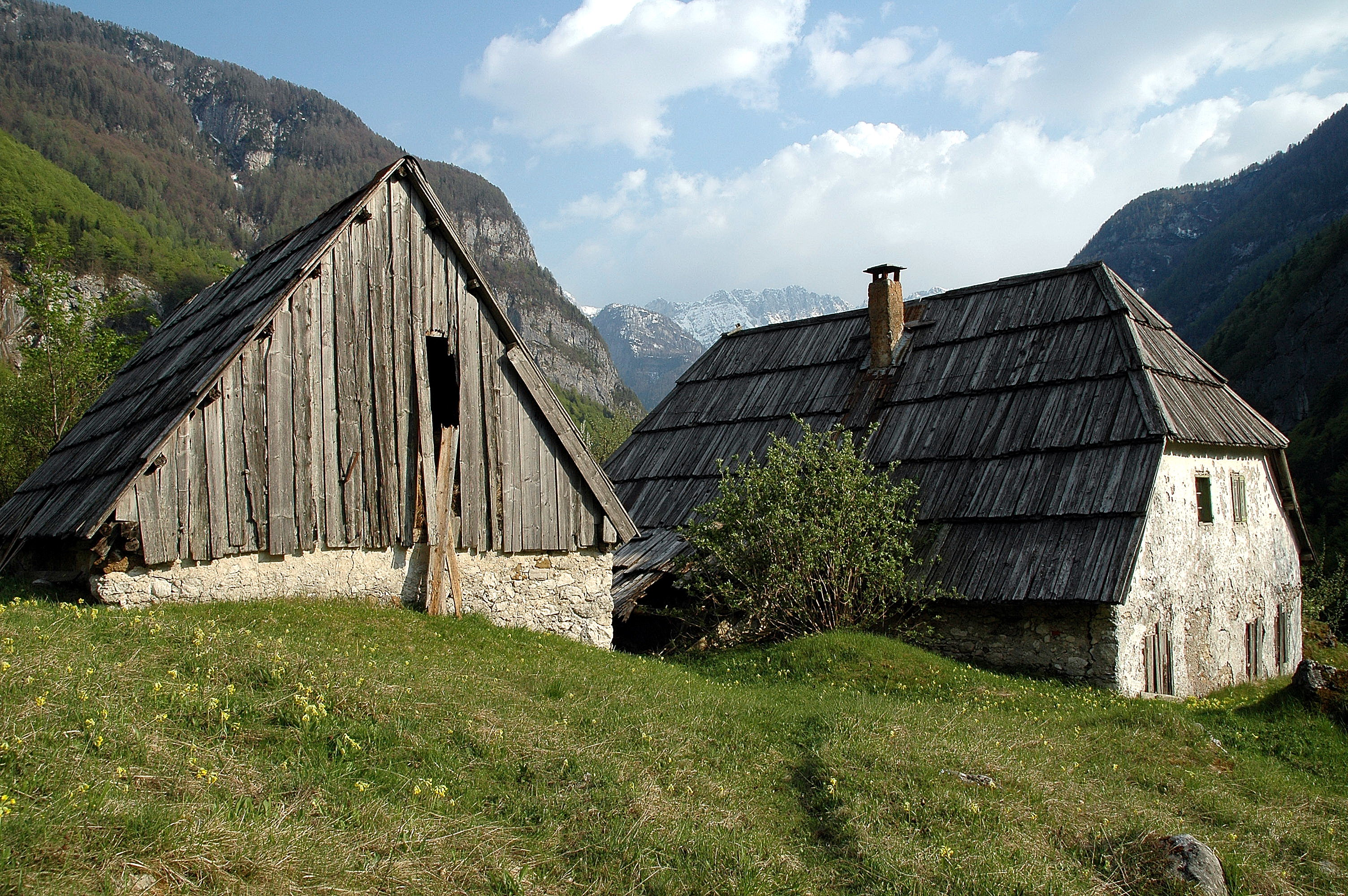
Typical farmhouse in Triglav National Park, Slovenia

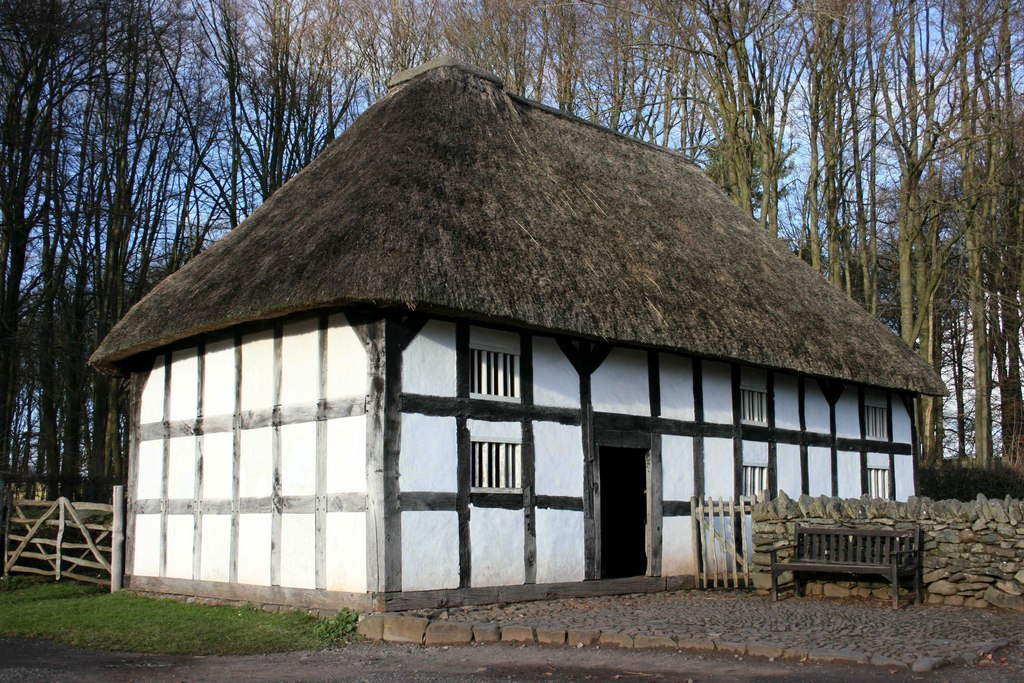
A half-timbered farmhouse in Wales

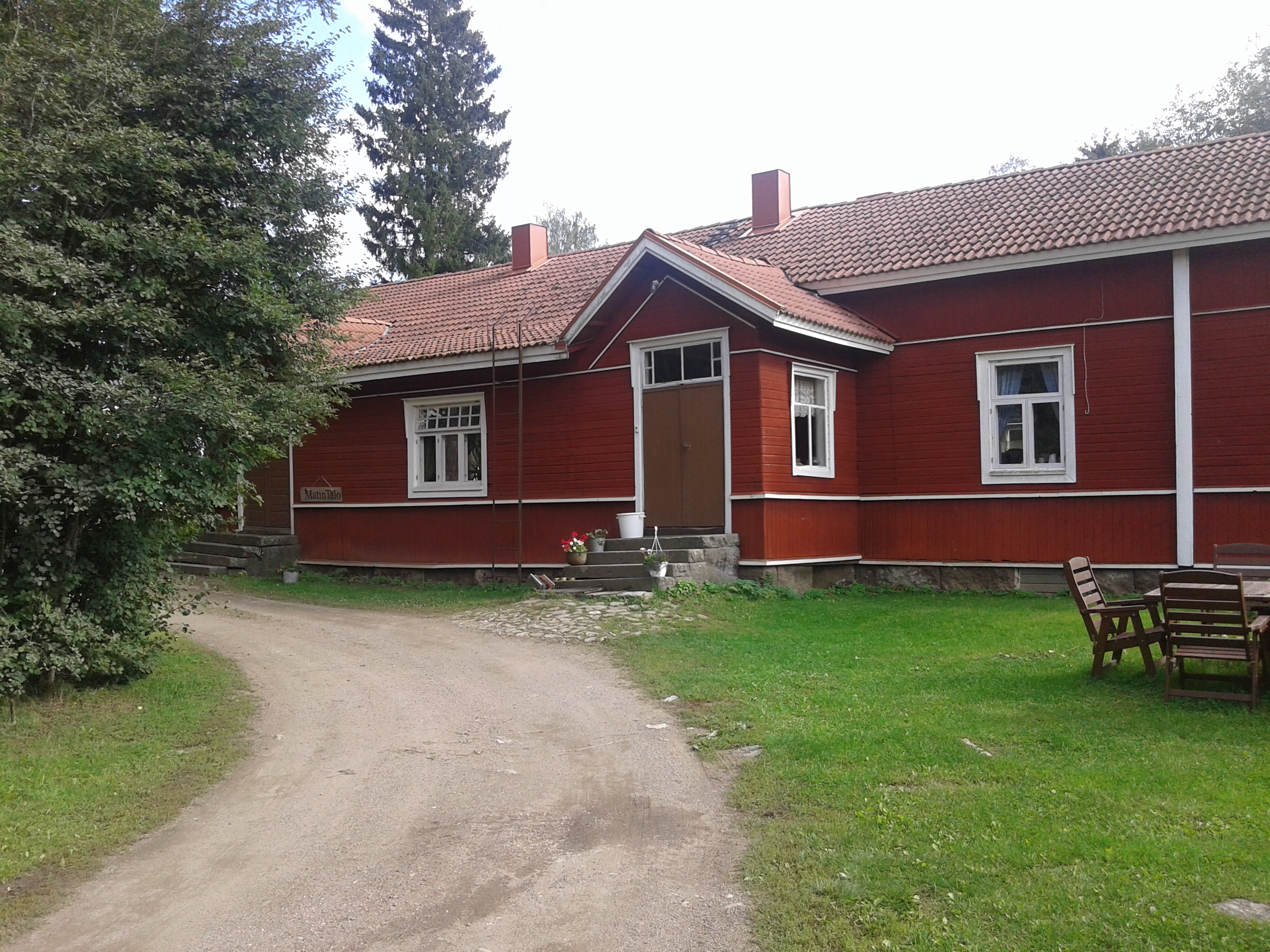
A farmhouse in Kokemäki, Finland

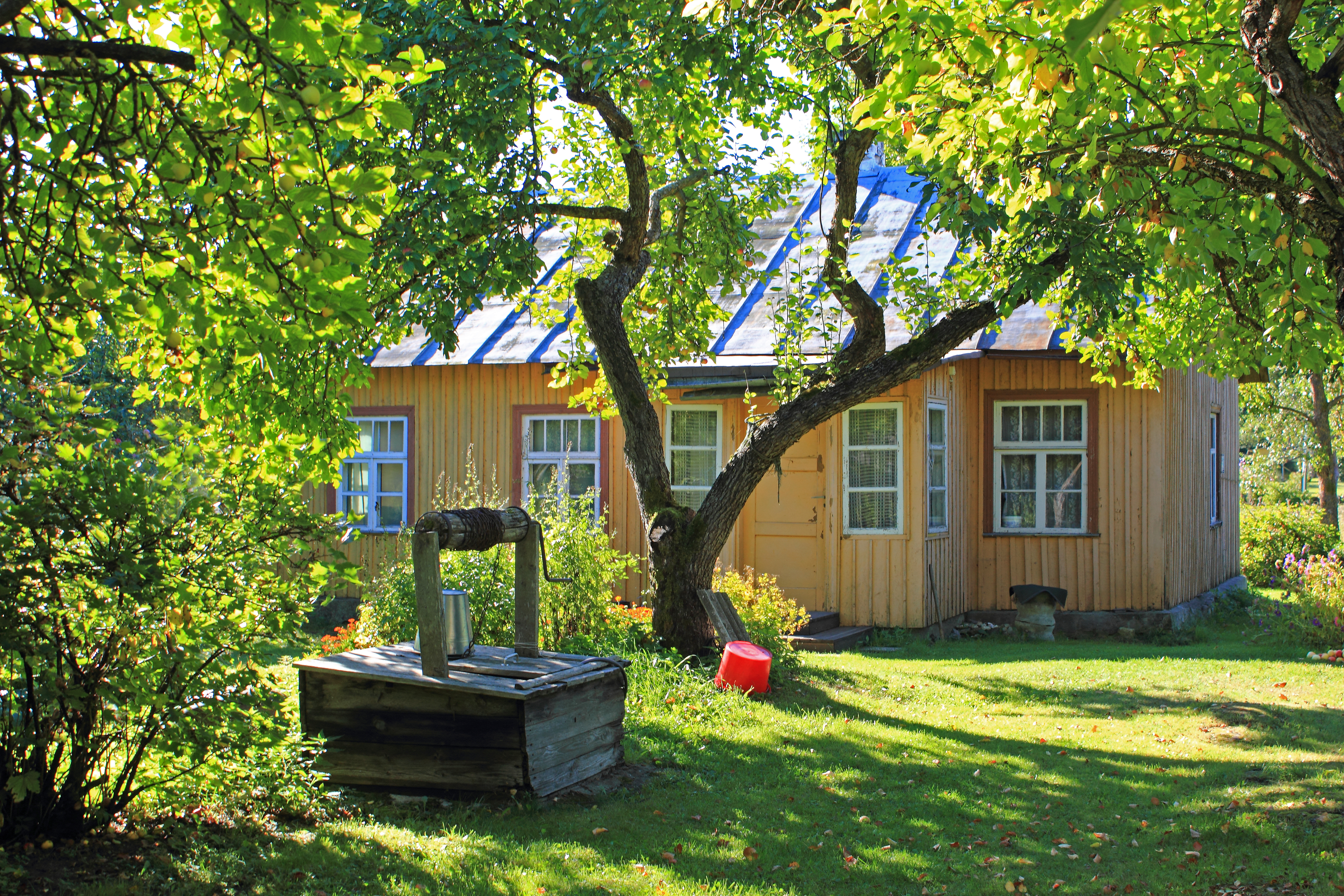
A farmhouse in Haapsu, Saaremaa, Estonia

==== France ====
A Bresse house (French: Ferme bressane) is a type of farmhouse found in the Bresse region and characterized by its long length, brick walls and wooden roof. A Mas is a traditional farmhouse unique to Provence and Southern France.

==== Germany ====
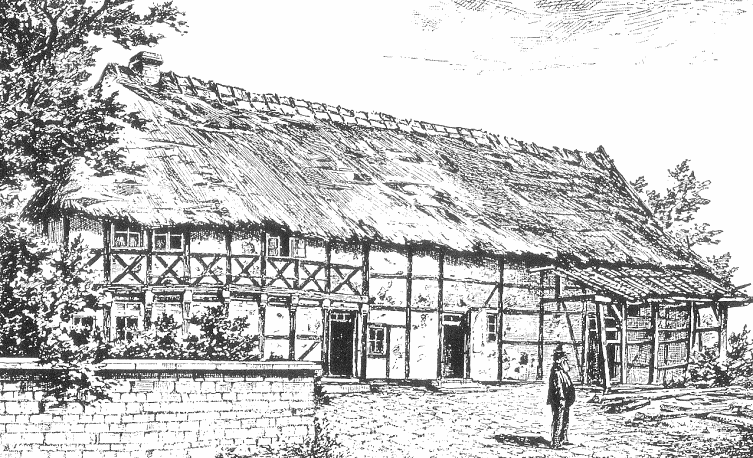
A timber-framed Middle German house in Klein Schöppenstedt near Cremlingen around 1900

Historically there were three main types of German farmhouses, many of which survive today. The Low German house or Niedersachsenhaus (Lower Saxony house) is found mainly on the North German Plain, but also in large parts of the Netherlands. It is a large structure with a sweeping roof supported by two to four rows of internal posts. The large barn door at the gable end opens into a spacious hall, or Deele, with cattle stalls and barns on either side and living accommodation at the end. The Middle German house may also be a single unit, but access is from the side, and the roof is supported by the outside walls. Later this type of mitteldeutsches Haus was expanded to two or more buildings around a rectangular farmyard, often with a second story. The South German house is found in southern Germany and has two main variants, the Swabian or Black Forest house and the Bavarian farmstead.

==== Italy ====
A Cascina a corte is a courtyard building whose arrangement is based on the Roman villa found in the Po Valley of northern Italy. A house called Casa colonica in Italy is a type of farmhouse where the residents work the land but do not own the farm.

==== Malta ====
Ta' Tabibu Farmhouse and Ta' Xindi Farmhouse are two typical Maltese farmhouses built with the use of Limestone material. In Maltese a farmhouse is called Razzett. Other examples of Maltese farmhouses are the Ta' Cisju Farmhouse and The Devil's Farmhouse.

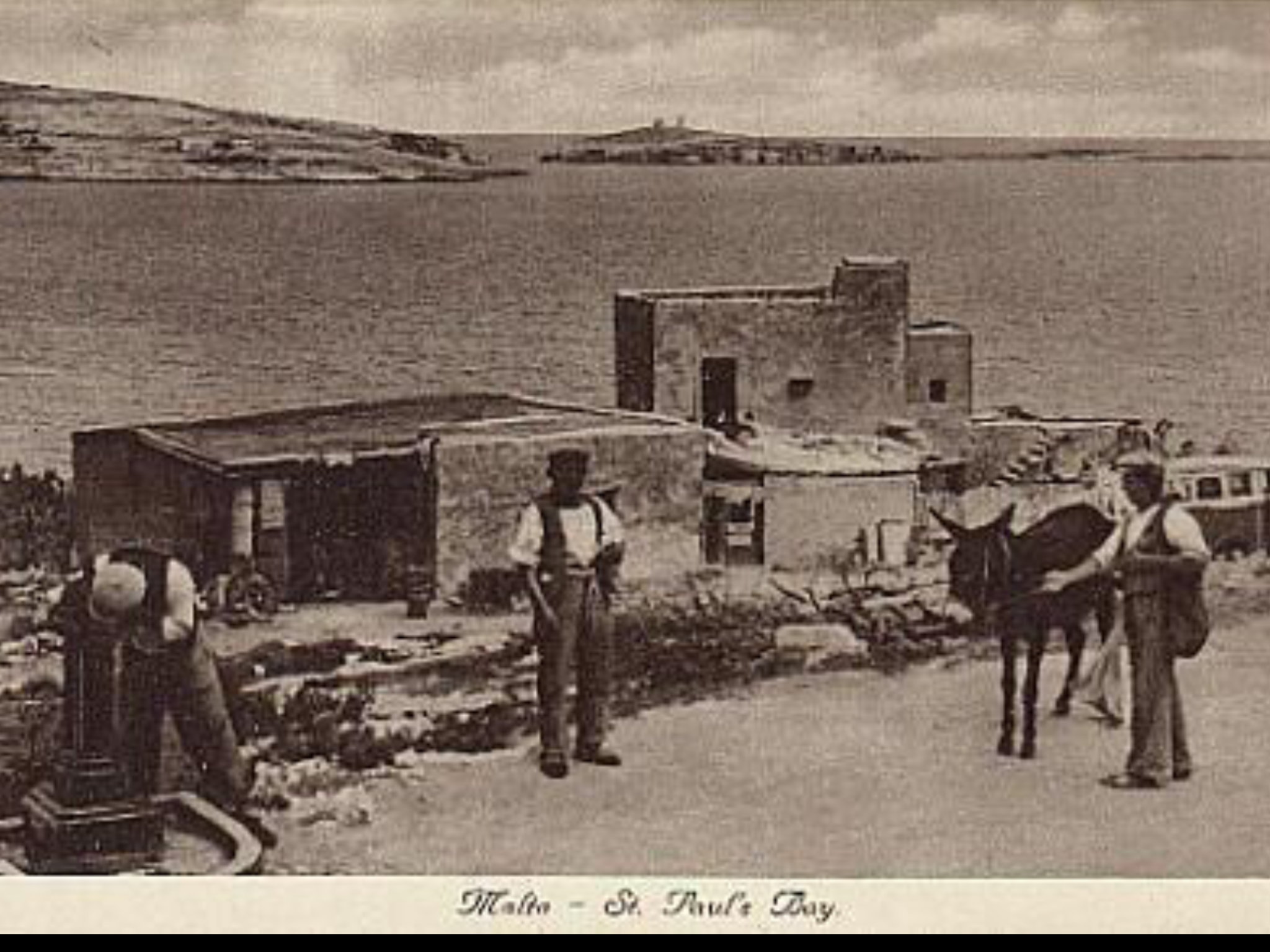
Ta' Tabibu Farmhouse at St. Paul's Bay, Malta

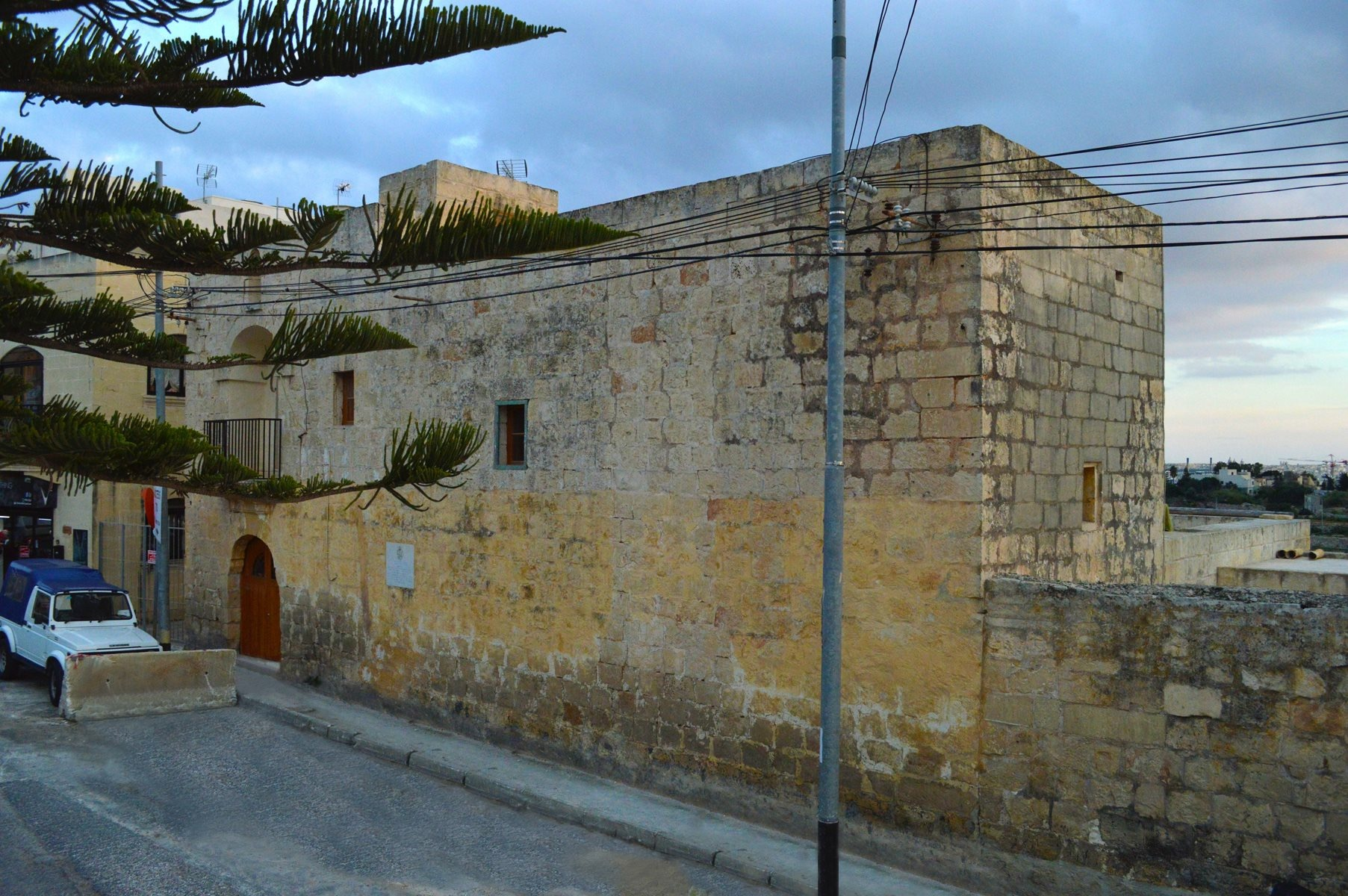
Ta' Xindi Farmhouse at San Gwann, Malta

=== North America ===
Types of farmhouses in North America include the following:

==== Canada ====
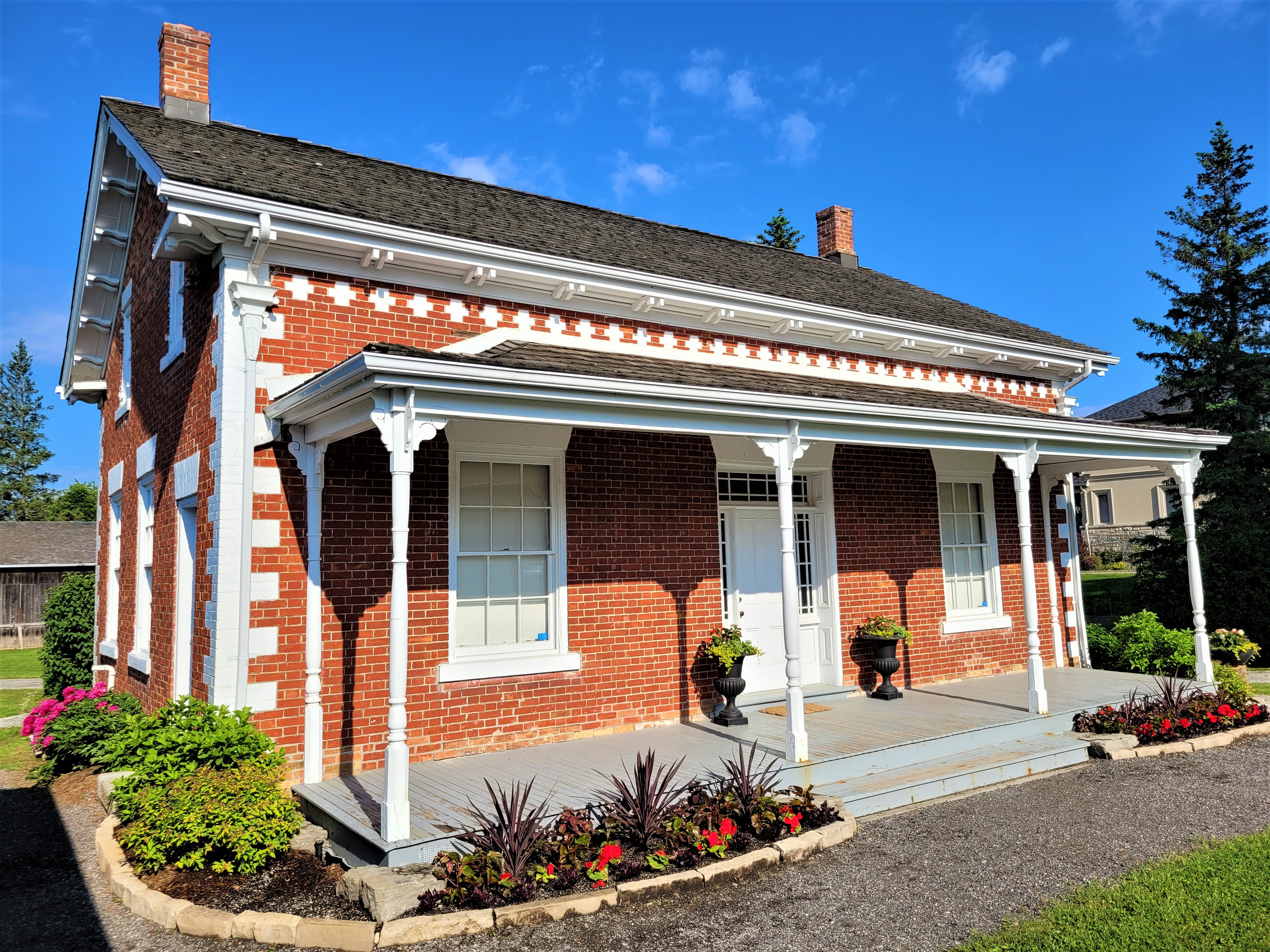
Victorian Farmhouse in Vandorf, Ontario

Canadian farmhouses were influenced by European settlers. In Quebec, the style varied from Gothic to Swiss, with the kitchen being the most important room in the house. In Ontario, the farmhouses of the late 19th century were of Victorian influence. Earlier ones used clapboard and later variations had brick. Many had front porches. In the west, dwellings varied from single-story wooden homesteads to straw huts. Wooden houses were built later as railroads brought wood from the Rockies (Alberta, British Columbia). By the early 1900s houses could be purchased as kits from several Canadian and American companies.

==== United States ====
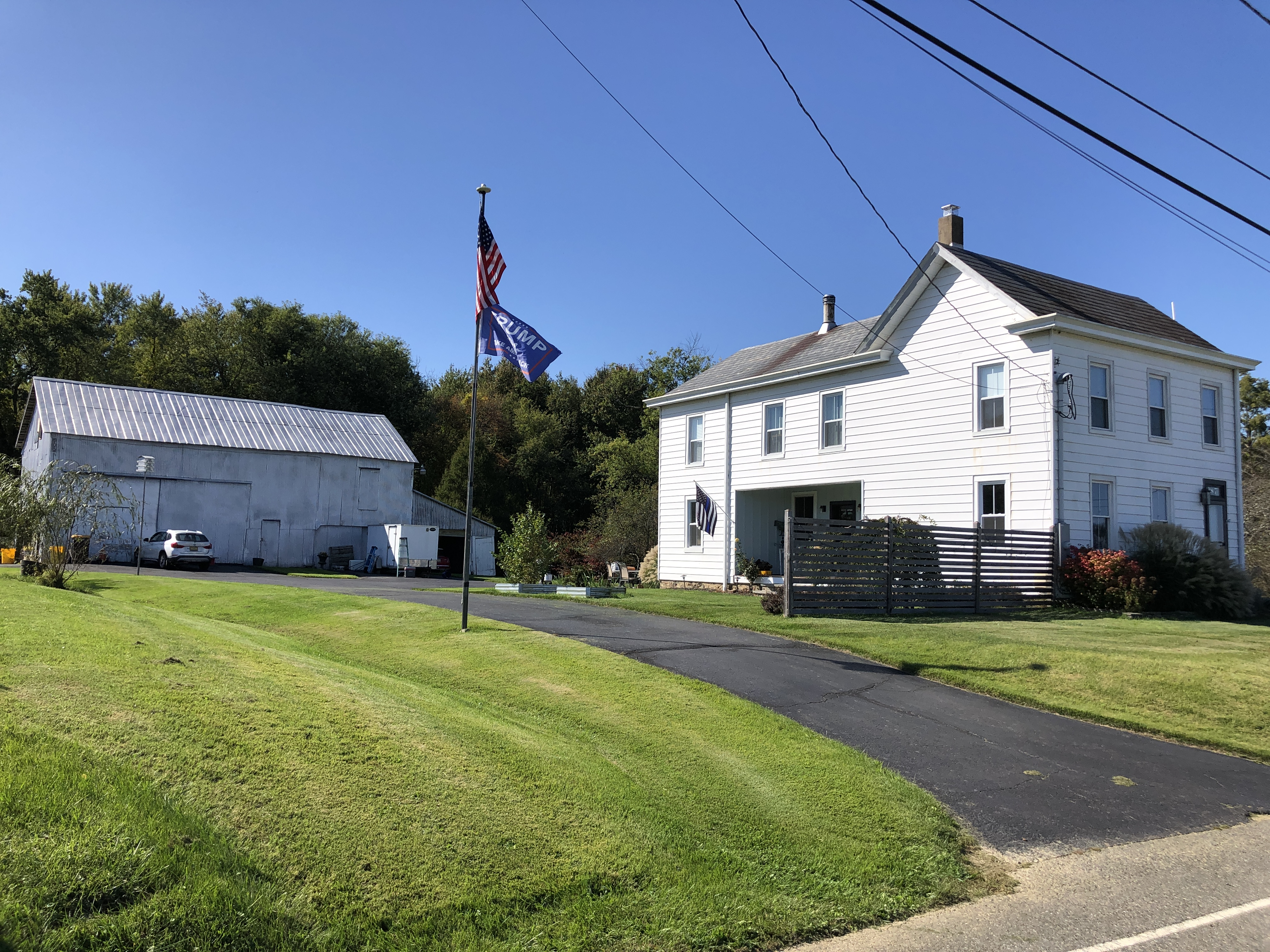
A typical American farmhouse, taken in 2023. The farm this house served has since been purchased for parkland.

American farmhouses had a straightforward construction designed to function amidst a working farm in a rural setting. They had a simple rectangular floor plan, usually built with local materials, and included a dominant centrally located fireplace for cooking and heating.

== See also ==
- List of house types
- Types of agricultural buildings
- Ranch house
- Plantation house
