= Kneške Ravne =

Kneške Ravne Ravne (until 1953)
- Location in Slovenia
- Coordinates: 46°12′54.46″N 13°49′26.54″E
- Country: Slovenia
- Traditional region: Slovenian Littoral
- Statistical region: Gorizia
- Municipality: Tolmin

Area
  - Total: 12.64 km^{2} (4.88 sq mi)
- Elevation: 744.4 m (2,442 ft)

Population (2002)
  - Total: 11

Kneške Ravne (pronounced [ˈkneːʃkɛ ˈɾáːwnɛ]) is a dispersed settlement in the hills north of the Bača Valley in the Municipality of Tolmin in the Littoral region of Slovenia. It lies in the southern border area of Triglav National Park and is a popular starting point for hikes in the southwestern Julian Alps. The settlement has been part of the park since 2010.

== Name ==
The name of the settlement was changed from Ravne to Kneške Ravne (literally, 'Kneža Ravne') in 1953, distinguishing it from nearby Tolminske Ravne (literally 'Tolmin Ravne') and similarly named settlements. The name Ravne is frequent in Slovenia and is adjectival in origin, resulting from ellipsis of the noun phrase ravne njive 'flat fields, level fields', referring to the local geography.
