= Fran Jesenko =

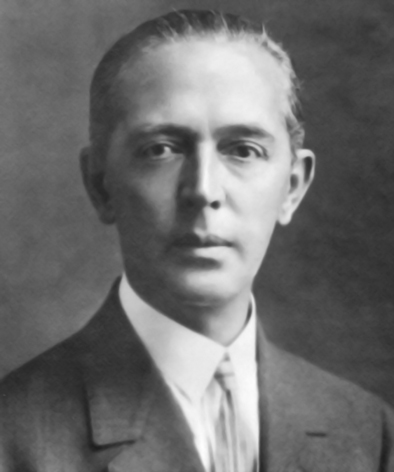
- Born: 14 March 1875; Škofja Loka, Austria-Hungary
- Died: 14 July 1932 (aged 57); Ljubljana, Kingdom of Yugoslavia
- Education: University of Vienna
- Known for: plant genetics, nature conservation efforts
- Scientific career
- Fields: botany, plant physiology, plant genetics
- Workplaces: Hochschüle für Bodenkultur; University of Zagreb; University of Ljubljana

Fran Jesenko (14 March 1875 – 14 July 1932) was a Slovenian botanist and plant geneticist who became notable for his work on the hybridisation of wheat and rye.

After attending high school in Ljubljana, Jesenko enrolled in the University of Vienna and graduated in 1902. During his studies, he became a tutor to two Oriental princes at Vienna's Teresianum college for boys, later also serving in this capacity for Count Merveldt. His position gave him the opportunity to travel all across Europe and later to Egypt, where he studied desert flora. In 1909, he became a research assistant under Erich von Tschermak at the College of Agriculture (Hochschule für Bodenkultur; now University of Natural Resources and Life Sciences) in Vienna, and a lecturer in 1913.

During his period in Vienna, Jesenko commenced several studies on plant hybridisation under von Tschermak's supervision, obtaining fertile hybrids between different varieties of wheat and rye with the help of backcrossing, and studying their characteristics with reference to Mendelian principles. He proposed that the reduced fertility of hybrids was a consequence of chromosomal incompatibility, as well as morphological differences. With this, he was one of the pioneers of studies on triticale and intergeneric hybrids in general.

His work was interrupted by World War I, during which Jesenko was sent to the Eastern Front, where he was injured and imprisoned. After the war, he returned to his homeland to become a lecturer at the University of Zagreb (Croatia), and a full professor in 1920. In the meantime, he worked on setting up a botanical institute in Ljubljana and in 1921 became the first professor of botany at the recently established University of Ljubljana. He also continued his studies on plant hybrids and helped found a research station in Beltinci.

In addition to plant genetics, Jesenko was notable as one of the proponents of Triglav National Park, the only national park in Slovenia today and one of the earliest in Europe. In 1924, the Alpine Conservation Park was founded, and Jesenko demarcated part of its borders with his students. He used to spend summers there, studying alpine flora with students and contributing to the area's permanent legal protection, which was only secured in 1981, long after Jesenko's death. He died in the summer of 1932 after a mountaineering accident on the Komarča rock face while doing his studies there. With a broken back, he was transferred to a hospital in Ljubljana, where he died on 14 July.

The award given by the Biotechnical Faculty since 1972 is named in his honor (Slovene: Jesenkovo priznanje), as are a street in Ljubljana and the 3-kilometre (1.9 mi) Jesenko Trail on Rožnik Hill.
