= Kneža =

- Location in Slovenia
- Coordinates: 46°9′41.82″N 13°49′34.84″E
- Country: Slovenia
- Traditional region: Slovenian Littoral
- Statistical region: Gorizia
- Municipality: Tolmin

Area
  - Total: 2.93 km^{2} (1.13 sq mi)
- Elevation: 229.9 m (754 ft)

Population (2002)
  - Total: 213

Kneža (pronounced [ˈkneːʒa]) is a village in the Bača Valley in the Municipality of Tolmin in the Littoral region of Slovenia. The Bohinj Railway line runs through the settlement.

== Name ==
Kneža was attested in written sources in 1377 as villa de Chinessa, and the corresponding hydronym (today Knežica Creek) was attested as Knesaha in 891. The name is derived from *Kъnędz′a (vьsь/voda/rěka) 'prince's (village/creek/river)', indicating that the territory was owned by a prince.

== Church ==
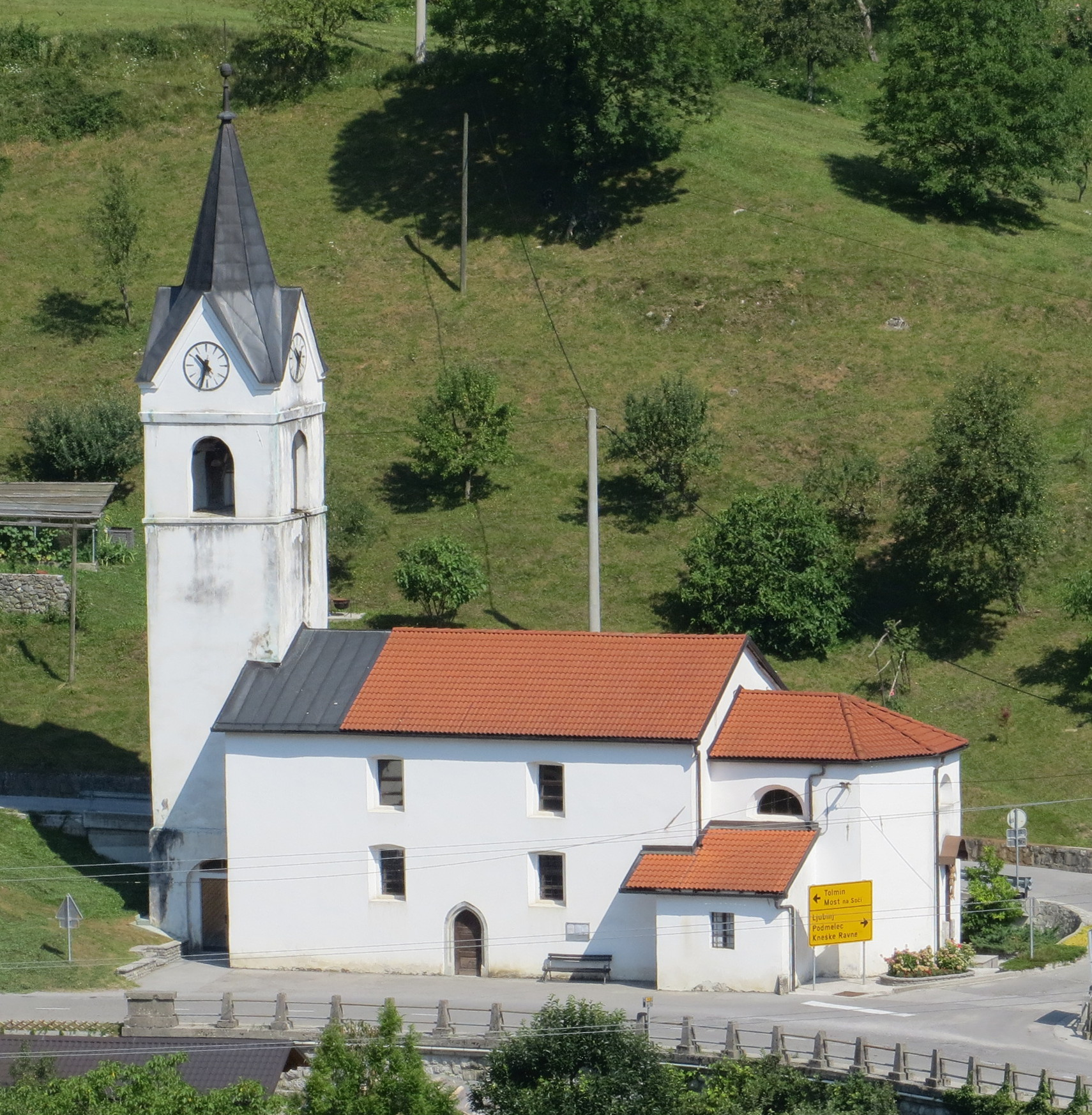
Saint George's Church

The parish church in the settlement is dedicated to Saint George and belongs to the Koper Diocese.
