= Usance =

Usance refers to the utilization of economic goods to satisfy needs. In manufacturing, "usance" means "inputs." It is used in "usance bills."

In medieval banking, "usance" denoted the period of time, set by custom, before a bill of exchange could be redeemed at its destination. In modern banking terminology, "usance" refers to the time between the issuance of a bill of exchange and its payment.
