= Ravne, Vareš =

Ravne
- Village
- Location within Bosnia and Herzegovina
- Coordinates: 44.1219234°N 18.4497832°E
- Country: Bosnia and Herzegovina
- Entity: Federation of Bosnia and Herzegovina
- Canton: Zenica-Doboj
- Municipality: Vareš

Area
  - Total: 5.30 sq mi (13.72 km^{2})

Population (2013)
  - Total: 204
  - Density: 38.5/sq mi (14.9/km^{2})
- Time zone: UTC+1 (CET)
  - Summer (DST): UTC+2 (CEST)

Ravne is a village in the municipality of Vareš, Bosnia and Herzegovina.

== Demographics ==
According to the 2013 census, its population was 204, all Bosniaks.
