= Ravne pri Šmartnem =

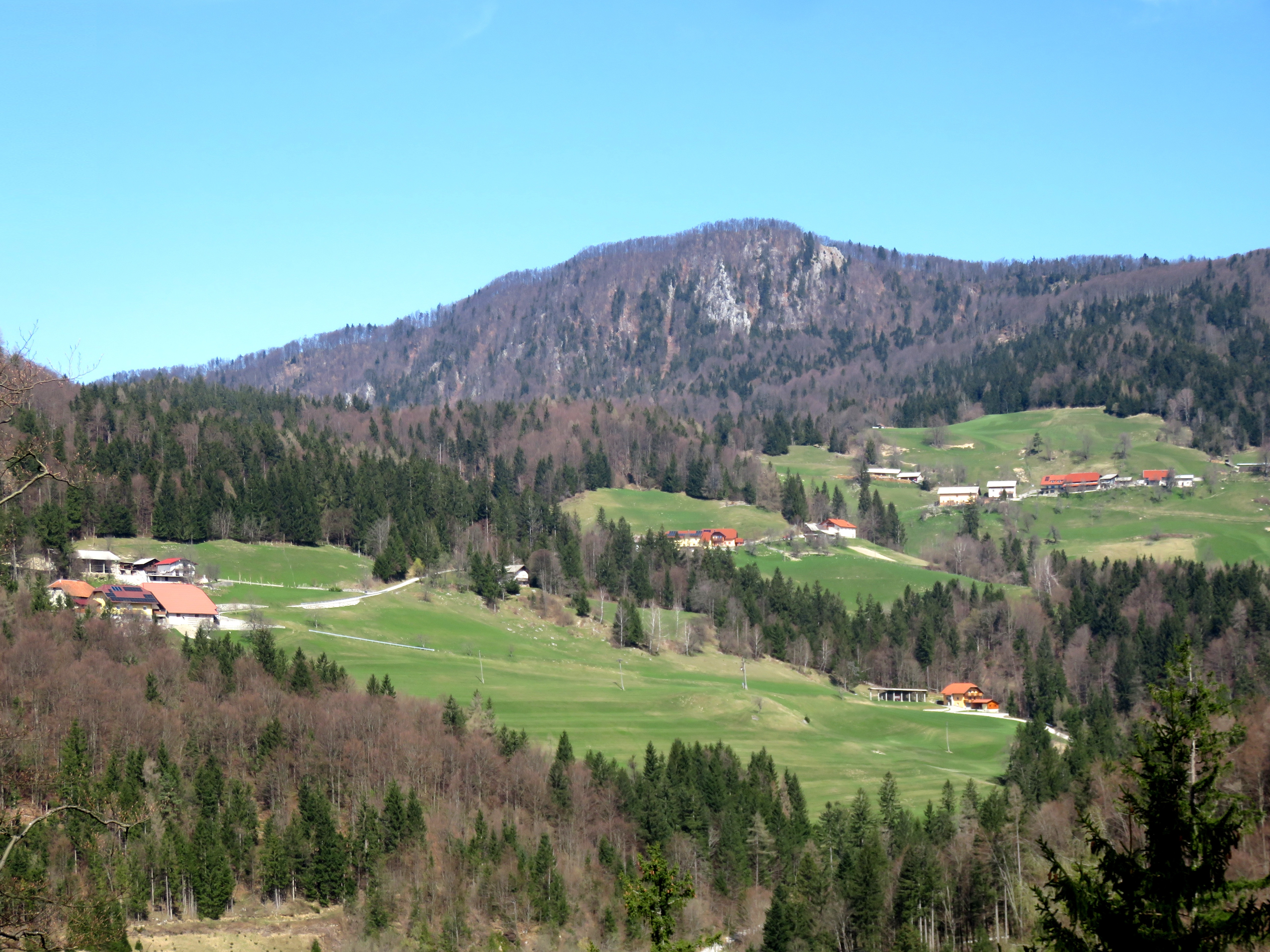

- Location in Slovenia
- Coordinates: 46°14′50.94″N 14°44′2.45″E
- Country: Slovenia
- Traditional region: Upper Carniola
- Statistical region: Central Slovenia
- Municipality: Kamnik

Area
  - Total: 3.94 km^{2} (1.52 sq mi)
- Elevation: 763.8 m (2,506 ft)

Population (2002)
  - Total: 46

Ravne pri Šmartnem (pronounced [ˈɾáːwnɛ pɾi ˈʃmaːɾtnɛm]) is a dispersed settlement of isolated farmsteads above the Tuhinj Valley in the Municipality of Kamnik in the Upper Carniola region of Slovenia.

== Name ==
The name of the settlement was changed from Ravne to Ravne pri Šmartnem in 1953.
