= Tolminske Ravne =

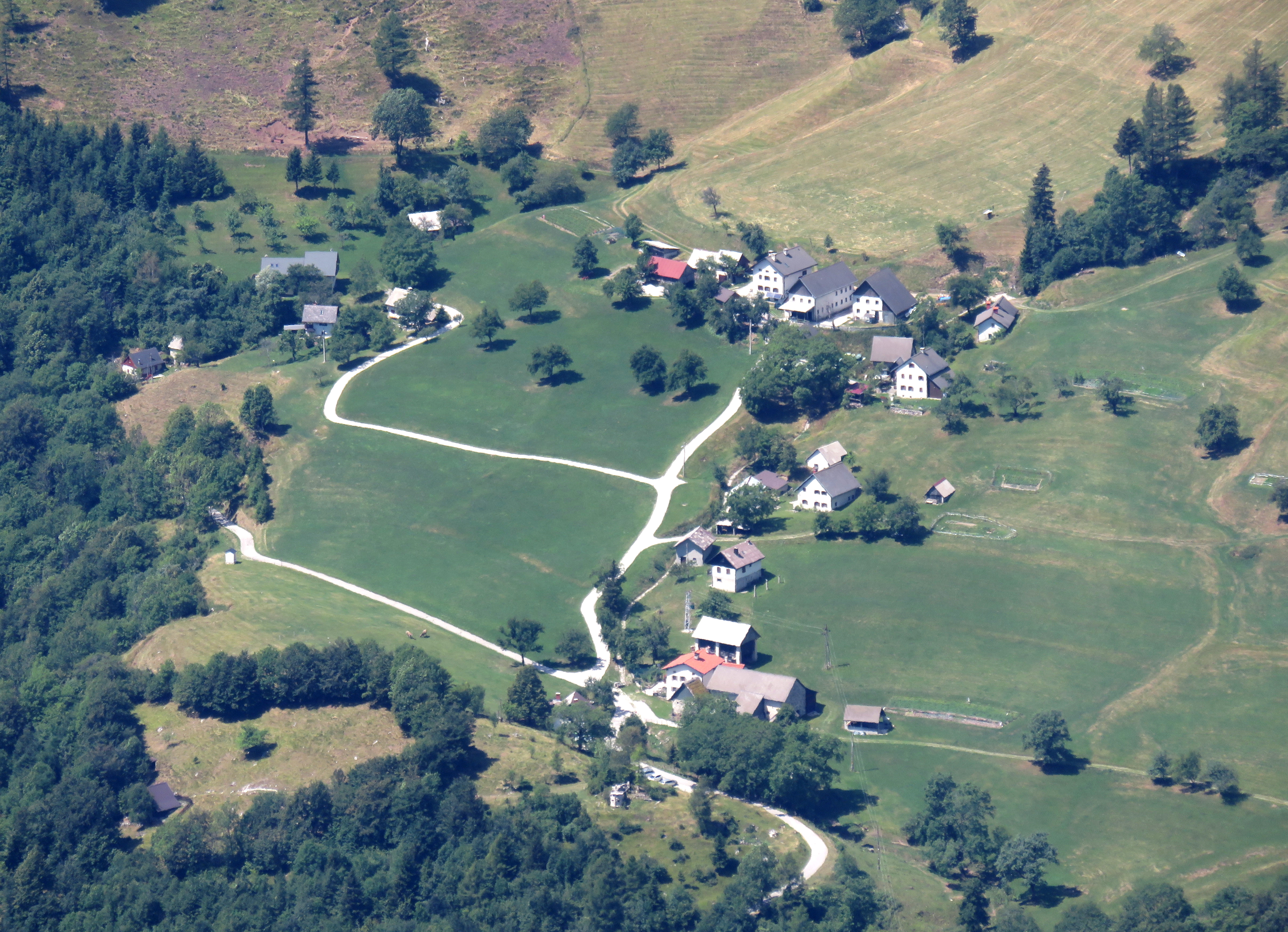

- Location in Slovenia
- Coordinates: 46°13′45.24″N 13°46′14.57″E
- Country: Slovenia
- Traditional region: Slovenian Littoral
- Statistical region: Gorizia
- Municipality: Tolmin

Area
  - Total: 13.83 km^{2} (5.34 sq mi)
- Elevation: 913 m (2,995 ft)

Population (2002)
  - Total: 13

Tolminske Ravne (pronounced [tɔlˈmíːnskɛ ˈɾáːwnɛ]) is a small settlement high in the hills northeast of Tolmin in the Littoral region of Slovenia. It lies within the boundaries of Triglav National Park.
