= Triglav National Park =

National park in Slovenia

- IUCN category II (national park)
- Interactive map of Triglav National Park
- Location: Slovenia
- Coordinates: 46°20′N 13°46′E
- Area: 880 km^{2} (340 sq mi)
- Established: 1981
- Visitors: 1.6 million (in 2006)
- Governing body: Javni zavod Triglavski narodni park
- Website: www.tnp.si

Triglav National Park (TNP; Slovene: Triglavski narodni park, TNP) is the only national park in Slovenia. It was established in its modern form in 1981 and is located in the northwestern part of the country, respectively the southeastern part of the Alpine massif. Mount Triglav, the highest peak of the Julian Alps, stands almost in the middle of the national park. From there the valleys spread out radially, supplying water to two large river systems with their sources in the Julian Alps: the Soča and the Sava, flowing to the Adriatic and Black Sea, respectively.

== History ==
The proposal for the protection of the Triglav Lakes Valley area was first put forward by the seismologist Albin Belar in 1906 or 1908. However, the proposal was not accepted, as there was no legal base for it and the laws of the time prohibited any restriction of pasture. The strategic basis for the protection of the area, titled The Memorandum (Spomenica), and which explicitly mentioned the proposal of Belar, was submitted to the Provincial Government for Slovenia in 1920. The idea was finally implemented in 1924. Then, at an initiative by the Nature Protection Section of the Slovene Museum Society together with the Slovene Mountaineering Society, a twenty-year lease was taken out on the Triglav Lakes Valley area, some 14 km². It was destined to become an Alpine Conservation Park; however, permanent conservation was not possible at that time. The name Triglavski narodni park was first used in 1926 by Fran Jesenko.

In 1961, after many years of effort, the protection was renewed (this time on a permanent basis) and somewhat enlarged, embracing around 20 km². The protected area was officially designated as Triglav National Park. It was named after Mount Triglav, a symbol of Slovenia and of Slovene character. However, all objectives of a true national park were not attained and for that reason over the next two decades new proposals for expanding and modifying this protection were put forward.

Finally, in 1981, Triglav National Park was officially established in the modern form. A rearrangement was achieved and the park was given a new concept and expanded to 838 km². In 2010, the park expanded to include the settlement Kneške Ravne (Tolmin), according to wishes of its inhabitants, thus the new park area amounts to 880 km², which is 4% of the area of Slovenia.

== Biodiversity ==
=== Flora ===
Systematic surveys of plants, especially of ethnobotanically useful species, in Triglav National Park have been carried out by Chandra Prakash Kala and Petra Ratajc covering various microhabitats, elevations, aspects, and terrain types. The park has over fifty-nine species of ethnobotanical values, of these 37 species (which contribute 62%) fall under four major categories of medicinal plants per the Official Gazette of the Republic of Slovenia such as H, Z, ZR and ND. Some important species such as Aconitum napellus, Cannabis sativa, and Taxus baccata are not allowed to be collected and used per the Official Gazette of the Republic of Slovenia.

=== Fauna ===
Triglav National Park is home to over 700 species of animals.

== Hydrology ==
Waters in Triglav National Park consist of two watersheds: the Sava River watershed and the Soča River watershed. Many waterfalls can be found in the park, and most of them are located in the valleys of Soča River and its tributaries. The highest waterfall is Boka Falls (106 m). The Tolmin Gorges on the Tolminka River are located in the national park.

The lakes in the park are all of glacial origin. The largest among them is Lake Bohinj. Others are the Triglav Lakes (located in the Triglav Lakes Valley), Lake Krn, and Lower and Upper Lake Križ.
